= List of cities, towns and villages in Vojvodina =

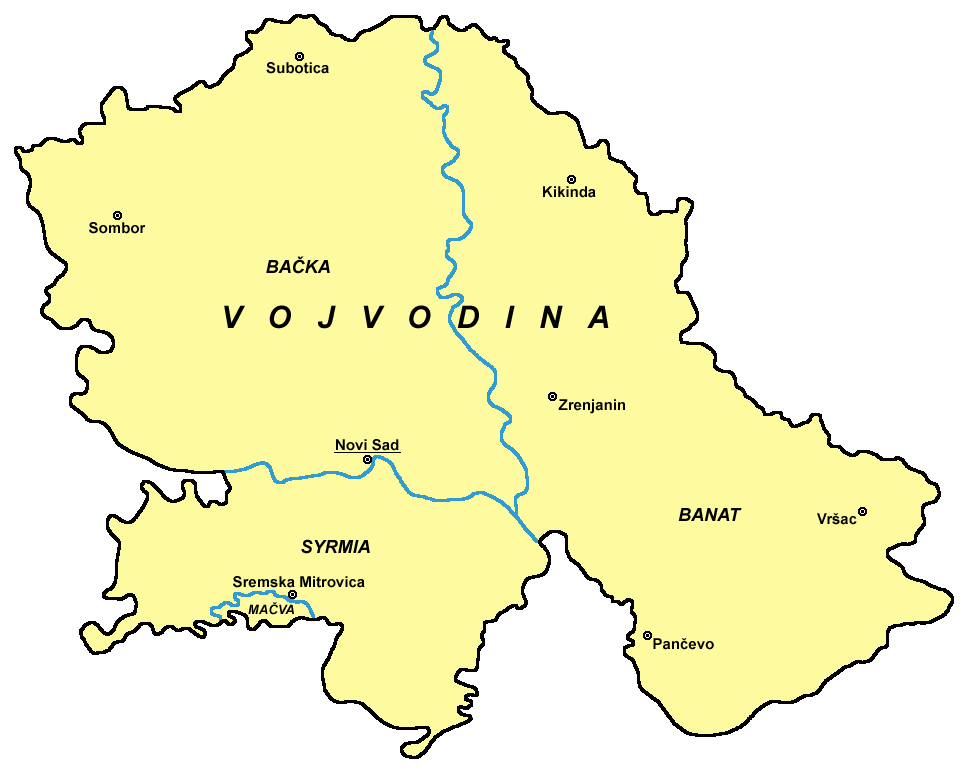
Cities in Vojvodina

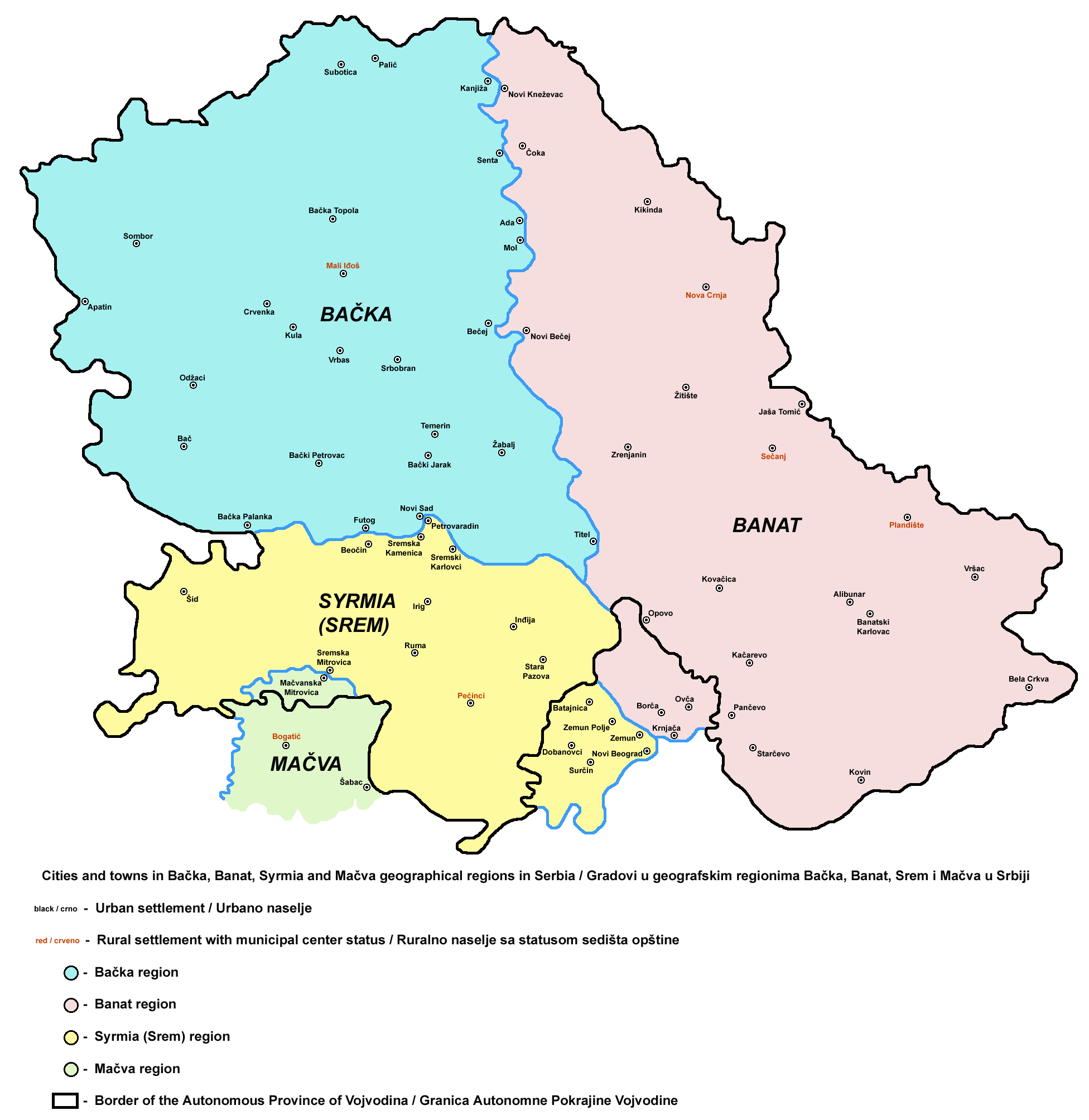
Cities and towns in Vojvodina

This is a list of cities, towns, and villages in Vojvodina, a province of Serbia.

== List of largest cities and towns in Vojvodina ==
City / town	Cyrillic Name	District	Population (2002)	Population (2011)	Image
Novi Sad	Нови Сад	South Bačka	191,405	231,798	Novi Sad
Subotica	Суботица	North Bačka	99,981	97,910	Subotica
Zrenjanin	Зрењанин	Central Banat	79,773	76,511	Zrenjanin
Pančevo	Панчево	South Banat	77,087	76,203	Pančevo
Sombor	Сомбор	West Bačka	51,471	47,623	Sombor
Kikinda	Кикинда	North Banat	41,935	38,065	Kikinda
Sremska Mitrovica	Сремска Митровица	Srem	39,084	37,751	Sremska Mitrovica
Vršac	Вршац	South Banat	36,623	36,040	Vršac
Ruma	Рума	Srem	32,229	30,076	Ruma
Bačka Palanka	Бачка Паланка	South Bačka	29,449	28,239	Bačka Palanka
Inđija	Инђија	Srem	26,247	26,025	Inđija
Vrbas	Врбас	South Bačka	25,907	24,112	Vrbas
Bečej	Бечеј	South Bačka	25,774	23,895	Bečej
Temerin	Темерин	South Bačka	19,216	19,661	Temerin
Senta	Сента	North Banat	20,302	18,704	Senta
Futog	Футог	South Bačka	18,582	18,641	Futog
Stara Pazova	Стара Пазова	Srem	18,645	18,602	Stara Pazova
Kula	Кула	West Bačka	19,301	17,866	Kula
Apatin	Апатин	West Bačka	19,320	17,411	Apatin

== List of urban settlements in Vojvodina ==
List of all urban settlements (cities and towns) in Vojvodina with population figures from recent censuses:

South Bačka District:

Urban settlement	Cyrillic Name	City / municipality	District	Population (1991)	Population (2002)	Population (2011)
Bač	Бач	Bač	South Bačka	6,046	6,087	5,399
Bačka Palanka	Бачка Паланка	Bačka Palanka	South Bačka	26,780	29,449	28,239
Bački Jarak	Бачки Јарак	Temerin	South Bačka	5,426	6,049	5,687
Bački Petrovac	Бачки Петровац	Bački Petrovac	South Bačka	7,236	6,727	6,155
Bečej	Бечеј	Bečej	South Bačka	26,634	25,774	23,895
Beočin	Беочин	Beočin	South Bačka	7,873	8,058	7,839
Futog	Футог	Novi Sad	South Bačka	16,048	18,582	18,641
Novi Sad	Нови Сад	Novi Sad	South Bačka	179,626	191,405	231,798
Petrovaradin	Петроварадин	Petrovaradin, Novi Sad	South Bačka	11,285	13,973	14,810
Srbobran	Србобран	Srbobran	South Bačka	12,798	13,091	12,009
Sremska Kamenica	Сремска Каменица	Petrovaradin, Novi Sad	South Bačka	7,955	11,205	12,273
Sremski Karlovci	Сремски Карловци	Sremski Karlovci	South Bačka	7,534	8,839	8,750
Temerin	Темерин	Temerin	South Bačka	16,971	19,216	19,661
Titel	Тител	Titel	South Bačka	6,007	5,894	5,294
Veternik	Ветерник	Novi Sad	South Bačka	10,271	18,626	17,454
Vrbas	Врбас	Vrbas	South Bačka	25,858	25,907	24,112
Žabalj	Жабаљ	Žabalj	South Bačka	8,766	9,598	9,161

West Bačka District:

Urban settlement	Cyrillic Name	City / municipality	District	Population (1991)	Population (2002)	Population (2011)
Apatin	Апатин	Apatin	West Bačka	18,389	19,320	17,411
Crvenka	Црвенка	Kula	West Bačka	10,409	10,163	9,001
Kula	Кула	Kula	West Bačka	19,311	19,301	17,866
Odžaci	Оџаци	Odžaci	West Bačka	10,567	9,940	8,811
Sombor	Сомбор	Sombor	West Bačka	48,993	51,471	47,623

North Bačka District:

Urban settlement	Cyrillic Name	City / municipality	District	Population (1991)	Population (2002)	Population (2011)
Bačka Topola	Бачка Топола	Bačka Topola	North Bačka	16,704	16,171	14,573
Palić	Палић	Subotica	North Bačka	7,375	7,745	7,771
Subotica	Суботица	Subotica	North Bačka	100,386	99,981	97,910

North Banat District:

Urban settlement	Cyrillic Name	City / municipality	District	Population (1991)	Population (2002)	Population (2011)
Ada	Ада	Ada	North Banat	12,078	10,547	9,564
Čoka	Чока	Čoka	North Banat	5,244	4,707	4,028
Kanjiža	Кањижа	Kanjiža	North Banat	11,541	10,200	9,871
Kikinda	Кикинда	Kikinda	North Banat	43,051	41,935	38,065
Mol	Мол	Ada	North Banat	7,522	6,786	6,009
Novi Kneževac	Нови Кнежевац	Novi Kneževac	North Banat	8,062	7,581	6,960
Senta	Сента	Senta	North Banat	22,827	20,302	18,704

Central Banat District:

Urban settlement	Cyrillic Name	City / municipality	District	Population (1991)	Population (2002)	Population (2011)
Jaša Tomić	Јаша Томић	Sečanj	Central Banat	3,544	2,982	2,373
Novi Bečej	Нови Бечеј	Novi Bečej	Central Banat	15,404	14,452	13,133
Zrenjanin	Зрењанин	Zrenjanin	Central Banat	81,316	79,773	76,511
Žitište	Житиште	Žitište	Central Banat	3,074	3,242	2,903

South Banat District:

Urban settlement	Cyrillic Name	City / municipality	District	Population (1991)	Population (2002)	Population (2011)
Alibunar	Алибунар	Alibunar	South Banat	3,738	3,431	3,007
Banatski Karlovac	Банатски Карловац	Alibunar	South Banat	6,286	5,820	5,082
Bela Crkva	Бела Црква	Bela Crkva	South Banat	11,634	10,675	9,080
Kačarevo	Качарево	Pančevo	South Banat	8,103	7,624	7,100
Kovačica	Ковачица	Kovačica	South Banat	7,426	6,764	6,259
Kovin	Ковин	Kovin	South Banat	13,669	14,250	13,515
Opovo	Опово	Opovo	South Banat	4,777	4,693	4,527
Pančevo	Панчево	Pančevo	South Banat	72,793	77,087	76,203
Starčevo	Старчево	Pančevo	South Banat	7,579	7,615	7,473
Vršac	Вршац	Vršac	South Banat	36,885	36,623	36,040

Srem District:

Urban settlement	Cyrillic Name	City / municipality	District	Population (1991)	Population (2002)	Population (2011)
Inđija	Инђија	Inđija	Srem	23,061	26,247	26,025
Irig	Ириг	Irig	Srem	4,414	4,848	4,415
Mačvanska Mitrovica	Мачванска Митровица	Sremska Mitrovica	Srem	3,788	3,896	3,873
Ruma	Рума	Ruma	Srem	28,582	32,229	30,076
Sremska Mitrovica	Сремска Митровица	Sremska Mitrovica	Srem	38,834	39,084	37,751
Stara Pazova	Стара Пазова	Stara Pazova	Srem	17,110	18,645	18,602
Šid	Шид	Šid	Srem	14,275	16,311	14,893

== The inhabited places of South Bačka District ==
=== City of Novi Sad ===
Settlement	Cyrillic Name Other Names	Type	Population (2011)	Largest ethnic group (2002)	Dominant religion (2002)
Novi Sad	Нови Сад	city	231,798	Serbs	Orthodox Christianity
Futog	Футог	town	18,641	Serbs	Orthodox Christianity
Begeč	Бегеч	village	3,325	Serbs	Orthodox Christianity
Budisava	Будисава	village	3,656	Serbs	Orthodox Christianity
Bukovac	Буковац	village	3,936	Serbs	Orthodox Christianity
Čenej	Ченеј	village	2,125	Serbs	Orthodox Christianity
Kać	Каћ	village	11,740	Serbs	Orthodox Christianity
Kisač	Кисач (Slovak: Kysáč)	village	5,091	Slovaks	Protestantism
Kovilj	Ковиљ	village	5,414	Serbs	Orthodox Christianity
Ledinci	Лединци	village	1,912	Serbs	Orthodox Christianity
Petrovaradin	Петроварадин	town	14,810	Serbs	Orthodox Christianity
Rumenka	Руменка	village	6,495	Serbs	Orthodox Christianity
Sremska Kamenica	Сремска Каменица	town	12,273	Serbs	Orthodox Christianity
Stari Ledinci	Стари Лединци	village	934	Serbs	Orthodox Christianity
Stepanovićevo	Степановићево	village	2,021	Serbs	Orthodox Christianity
Veternik	Ветерник	village	17,454	Serbs	Orthodox Christianity
Note: For the inhabited place with Slovak ethnic majority, the name is also given in Slovak.

Hamlets and suburbs:

- Bangladeš (Бангладеш)
- Kamenjar (Камењар)
- Lipov Gaj (Липов Гај)
- Nemanovci (Немановци)
- Pejićevi Salaši (Пејићеви Салаши)

=== Bač Municipality ===
Settlement	Cyrillic Name Other Names	Type	Population (2011)	Largest ethnic group (2002)	Dominant religion (2002)
Bač	Бач	town	5,399	Serbs	Orthodox Christianity
Bačko Novo Selo	Бачко Ново Село	village	1,072	Serbs	Orthodox Christianity
Bođani	Бођани	village	952	Serbs	Orthodox Christianity
Plavna	Плавна	village	1,152	Serbs	Orthodox Christianity
Selenča	Селенча (Slovak: Selenča)	village	2,996	Slovaks	Catholic Christianity
Vajska	Вајска	village	2,834	Serbs	Orthodox Christianity
Note: For the inhabited place with Slovak ethnic majority, the name is also given in Slovak.

Hamlets and suburbs:

- Labudnjača (Лабудњача)
- Mali Bač (Мали Бач)
- Živa (Жива)

=== Bačka Palanka Municipality ===
Settlement	Cyrillic Name Other Names	Type	Population (2011)	Largest ethnic group (2002)	Dominant religion (2002)
Bačka Palanka	Бачка Паланка	town	28,239	Serbs	Orthodox Christianity
Čelarevo	Челарево	village	4,831	Serbs	Orthodox Christianity
Despotovo	Деспотово	village	1,853	Serbs	Orthodox Christianity
Gajdobra	Гајдобра	village	2,578	Serbs	Orthodox Christianity
Karađorđevo	Карађорђево	village	738	Serbs	Orthodox Christianity
Mladenovo	Младеново	village	2,679	Serbs	Orthodox Christianity
Neštin	Нештин	village	794	Serbs	Orthodox Christianity
Nova Gajdobra	Нова Гајдобра	village	1,220	Serbs	Orthodox Christianity
Obrovac	Обровац	village	2,944	Serbs	Orthodox Christianity
Parage	Параге	village	921	Serbs	Orthodox Christianity
Pivnice	Пивнице (Slovak: Pivnice)	village	3,337	Slovaks	Protestantism
Silbaš	Силбаш	village	2,467	Serbs	Orthodox Christianity
Tovariševo	Товаришево	village	2,657	Serbs	Orthodox Christianity
Vizić	Визић	village	270	Serbs	Orthodox Christianity
Note: For the inhabited place with Slovak ethnic majority, the name is also given in Slovak.

=== Bački Petrovac Municipality ===
Settlement	Cyrillic Name Other Names	Type	Population (2011)	Largest ethnic group (2002)	Dominant religion (2002)
Bački Petrovac	Бачки Петровац (Slovak: Petrovec)	town	6,155	Slovaks	Protestantism
Gložan	Гложан (Slovak: Hložany)	village	2,002	Slovaks	Protestantism
Kulpin	Кулпин (Slovak: Kulpín)	village	2,775	Slovaks	Protestantism
Maglić	Маглић	village	2,486	Serbs	Orthodox Christianity
Note: For the inhabited places with Slovak ethnic majority, the names are also given in Slovak.

=== Bečej Municipality ===
Settlement	Cyrillic Name Other Names	Type	Population (2011)	Largest ethnic group (2002)	Dominant religion (2002)
Bečej	Бечеј (Hungarian: Óbecse)	town	23,895	Hungarians	Catholic Christianity
Bačko Gradište	Бачко Градиште (Hungarian: Bácsföldvár)	village	5,110	Hungarians	Catholic Christianity
Bačko Petrovo Selo	Бачко Петрово Село (Hungarian: Péterréve)	village	6,350	Hungarians	Catholic Christianity
Mileševo	Милешево (Hungarian: Drea)	village	909	Hungarians	Catholic Christianity
Radičević	Радичевић	village	1,087	Serbs	Orthodox Christianity
Note: For the inhabited places with absolute or relative Hungarian ethnic majority, the names are also given in Hungarian.

Hamlets:

- Drljan (Дрљан)
- Novo Selo (Ново Село)
- Poljanice (Пољанице)

=== Beočin Municipality ===
Settlement	Cyrillic Name Other Names	Type	Population (2011)	Largest ethnic group (2002)	Dominant religion (2002)
Beočin	Беочин	town	7,839	Serbs	Orthodox Christianity
Banoštor	Баноштор	village	743	Serbs	Orthodox Christianity
Čerević	Черевић	village	2,800	Serbs	Orthodox Christianity
Grabovo	Грабово	village	100	Serbs	Orthodox Christianity
Lug	Луг (Slovak: Lúg)	village	709	Slovaks	Protestantism
Rakovac	Раковац	village	2,248	Serbs	Orthodox Christianity
Susek	Сусек	village	996	Serbs	Orthodox Christianity
Sviloš	Свилош	village	291	Serbs	Orthodox Christianity
Note: For the inhabited place with Slovak ethnic majority, the name is also given in Slovak.

Hamlets:

- Koruška (Корушка)

=== Srbobran Municipality ===
Settlement	Cyrillic Name	Type	Population (2011)	Largest ethnic group (2002)	Dominant religion (2002)
Srbobran	Србобран	town	12,009	Serbs	Orthodox Christianity
Nadalj	Надаљ	village	2,008	Serbs	Orthodox Christianity
Turija	Турија	village	2,300	Serbs	Orthodox Christianity

Hamlets:

- Doline (Долине)
- Kipovo (Кипово)

=== Sremski Karlovci Municipality ===
Settlement	Cyrillic Name	Type	Population (2011)	Largest ethnic group (2002)	Dominant religion (2002)
Sremski Karlovci	Сремски Карловци	town	8,750	Serbs	Orthodox Christianity

=== Temerin Municipality ===
Settlement	Cyrillic Name	Type	Population (2011)	Largest ethnic group (2002)	Dominant religion (2002)
Temerin	Темерин	town	19,661	Serbs	Orthodox Christianity
Bački Jarak	Бачки Јарак	town	5,687	Serbs	Orthodox Christianity
Sirig	Сириг	village	2,939	Serbs	Orthodox Christianity

=== Titel Municipality ===
Settlement	Cyrillic Name	Type	Population (2011)	Largest ethnic group (2002)	Dominant religion (2002)
Titel	Тител	town	5,294	Serbs	Orthodox Christianity
Gardinovci	Гардиновци	village	1,297	Serbs	Orthodox Christianity
Lok	Лок	village	1,114	Serbs	Orthodox Christianity
Mošorin	Мошорин	village	2,569	Serbs	Orthodox Christianity
Šajkaš	Шајкаш	village	4,374	Serbs	Orthodox Christianity
Vilovo	Вилово	village	1,090	Serbs	Orthodox Christianity

=== Vrbas Municipality ===
Settlement	Cyrillic Name Other Names	Type	Population (2011)	Largest ethnic group (2002)	Dominant religion (2002)
Vrbas	Врбас	town	24,112	Serbs	Orthodox Christianity
Bačko Dobro Polje	Бачко Добро Поље	village	3,541	Serbs	Orthodox Christianity
Kosančić	Косанчић	village	101	Serbs	Orthodox Christianity
Kucura	Куцура (Rusyn: Коцур)	village	4,348	Rusyns	Greek Catholic Christianity
Ravno Selo	Равно Село	village	3,107	Serbs	Orthodox Christianity
Savino Selo	Савино Село	village	2,957	Serbs	Orthodox Christianity
Zmajevo	Змајево	village	3,926	Serbs	Orthodox Christianity
Note: For the inhabited place with Rusyn plurality, the name is also given in Rusyn language.

=== Žabalj Municipality ===
Settlement	Cyrillic Name	Type	Population (2011)	Largest ethnic group (2002)	Dominant religion (2002)
Žabalj	Жабаљ	town	9,161	Serbs	Orthodox Christianity
Čurug	Чуруг	village	8,166	Serbs	Orthodox Christianity
Đurđevo	Ђурђево	village	5,092	Serbs	Orthodox Christianity
Gospođinci	Госпођинци	village	3,715	Serbs	Orthodox Christianity

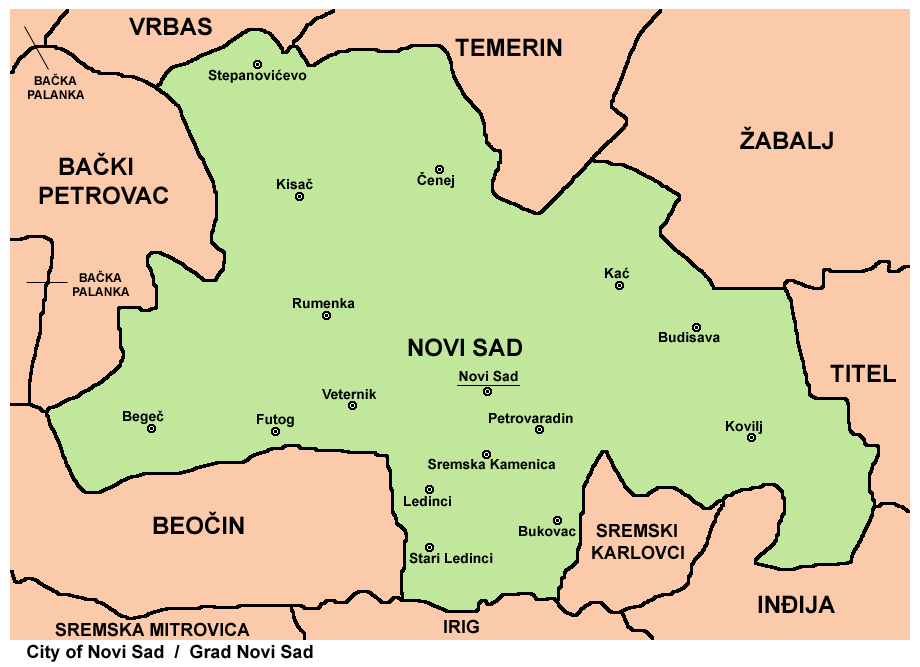
Map of Novi Sad City with the surrounding inhabited places

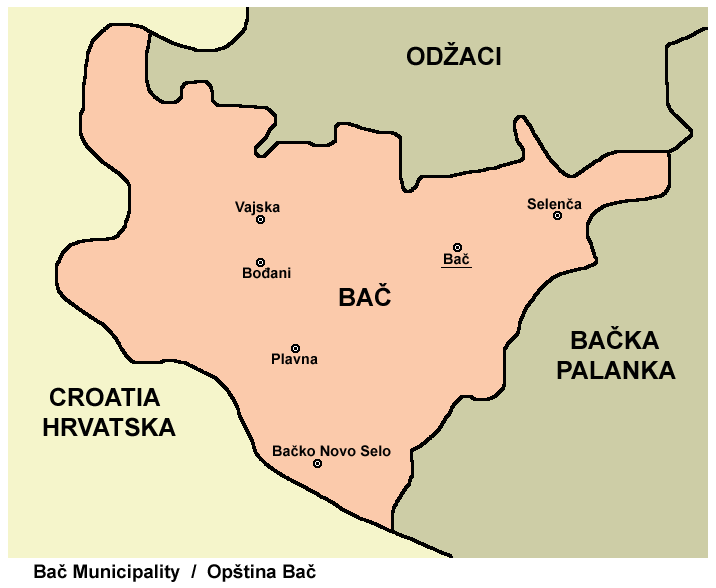
Map of Bač municipality

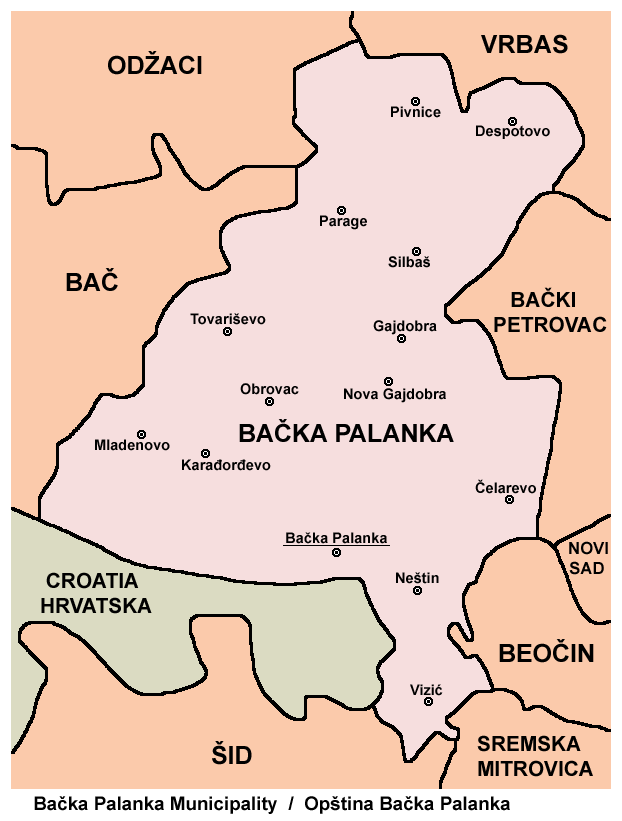
Map of Bačka Palanka municipality

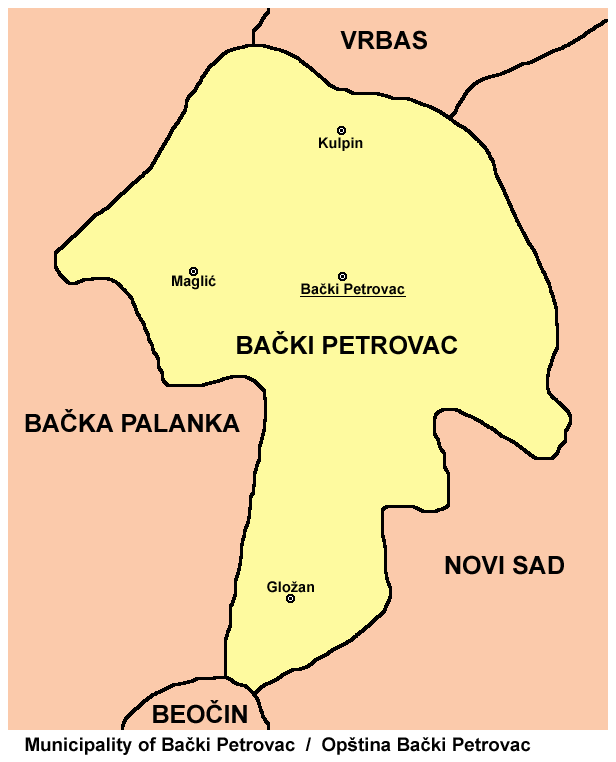
Map of Bački Petrovac municipality

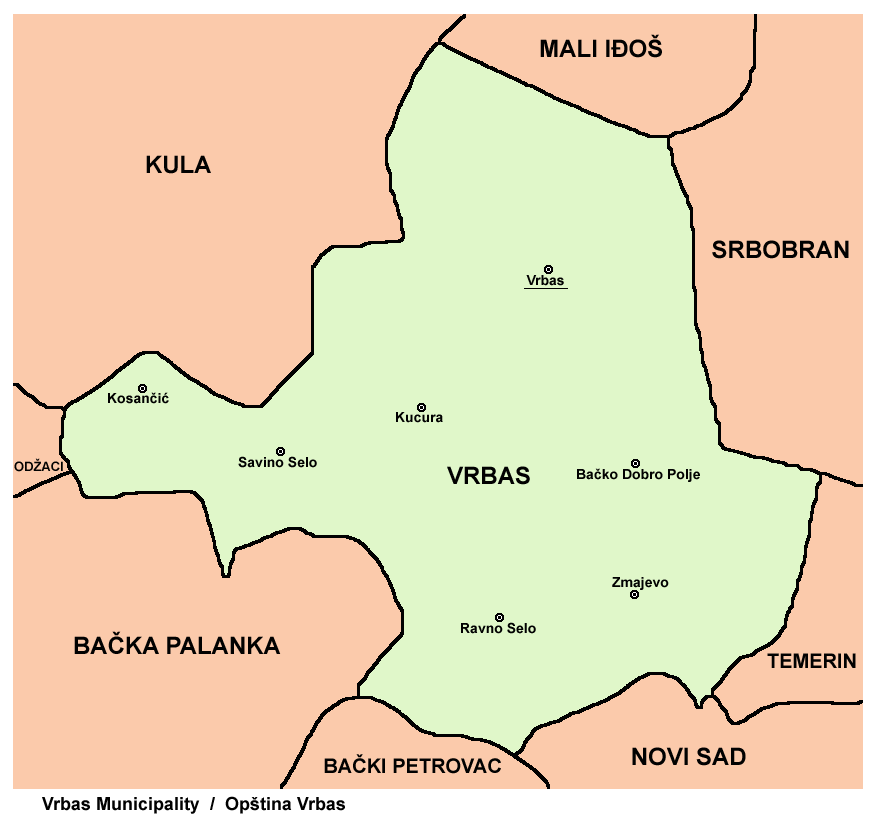
Map of Vrbas municipality

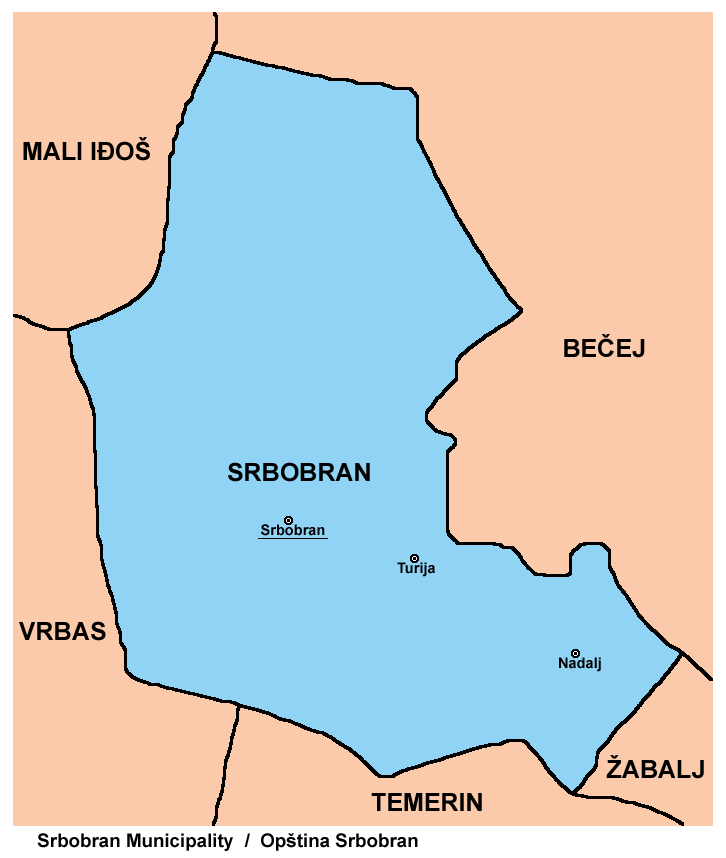
Map of Srbobran municipality

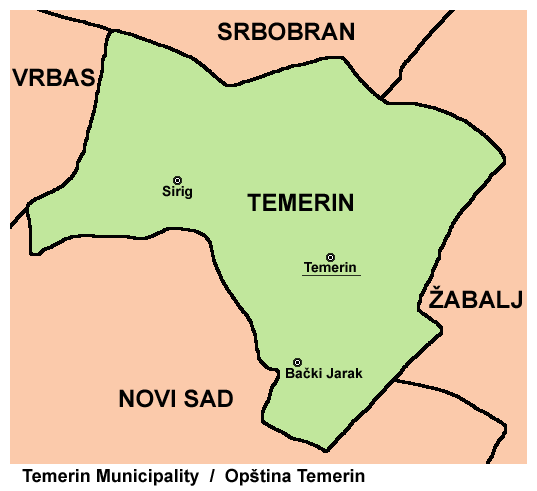
Map of Temerin municipality

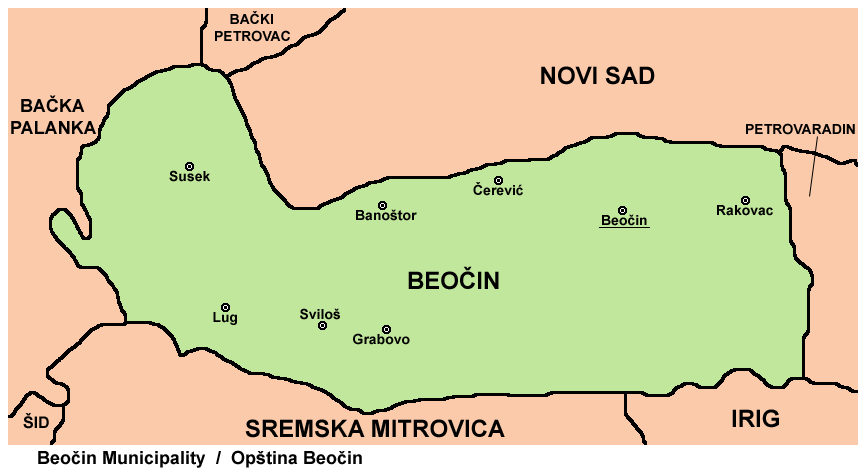
Map of Beočin municipality

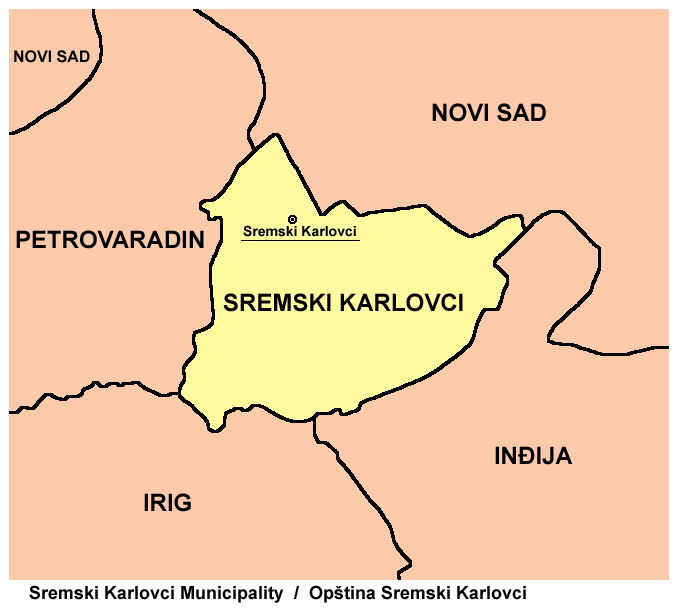
Map of Sremski Karlovci municipality

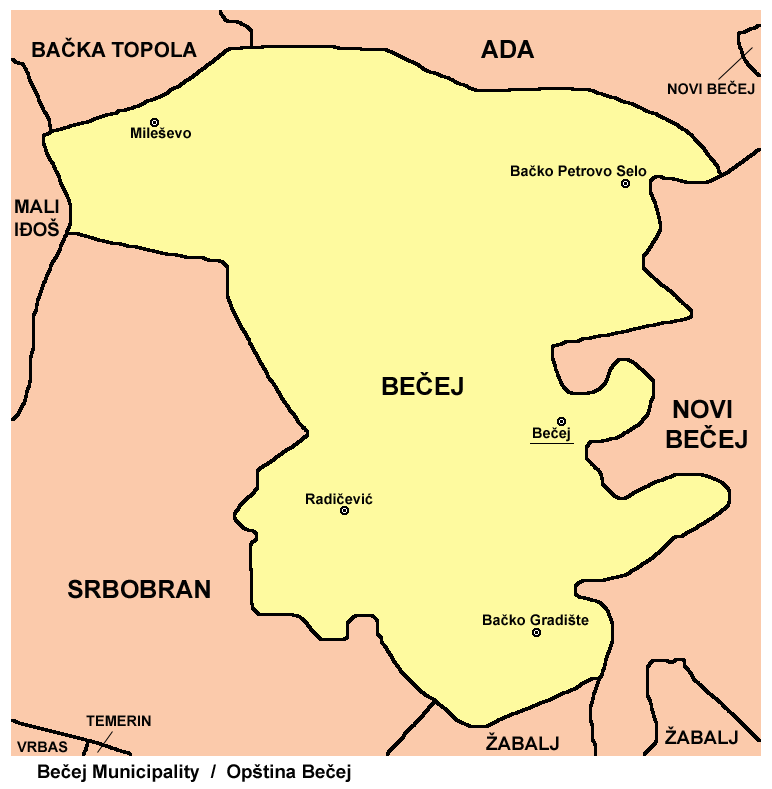
Map of Bečej municipality

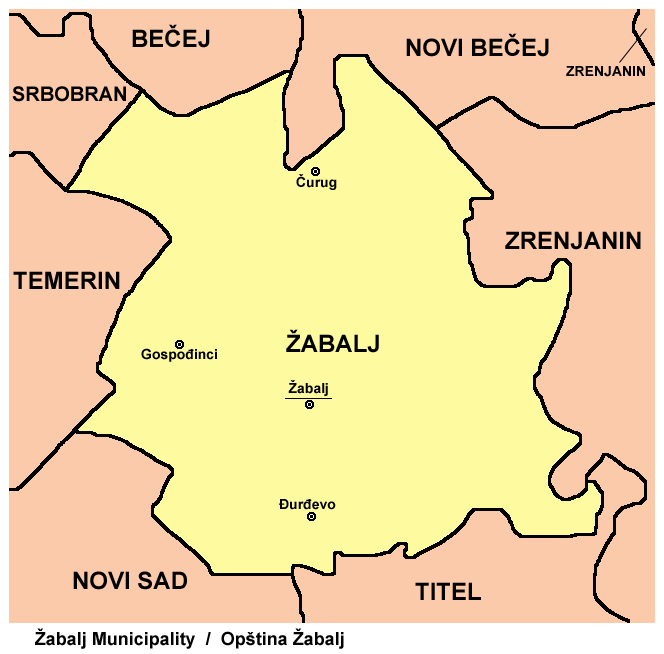
Map of Žabalj municipality

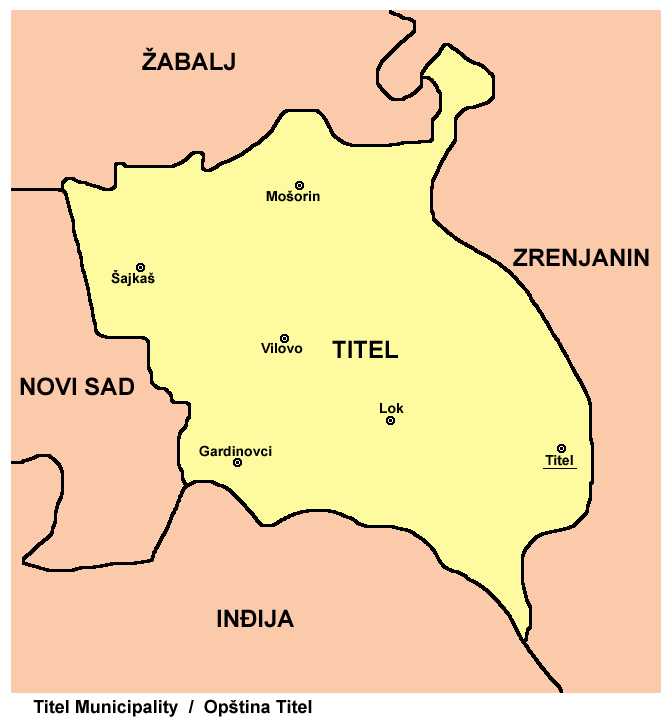
Map of Titel municipality

== The inhabited places of West Bačka District ==
=== City of Sombor ===
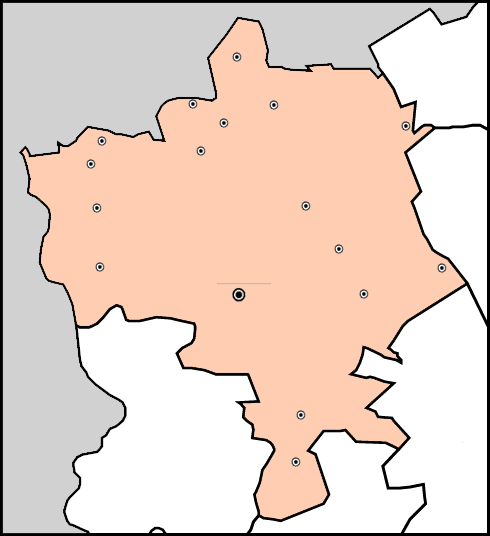

Settlement	Cyrillic Name Other Names	Type	Population (2011)	Largest ethnic group (2002)	Dominant religion (2002)
Sombor	Сомбор	city	47,623	Serbs	Orthodox Christianity
Aleksa Šantić	Алекса Шантић	village	1,770	Serbs	Orthodox Christianity
Bački Breg	Бачки Брег (Croatian: Bereg)	village	1,140	Croats	Catholic Christianity
Bački Monoštor	Бачки Моноштор (Croatian: Monoštor)	village	3,485	Croats	Catholic Christianity
Bezdan	Бездан (Hungarian: Bezdán)	village	4,623	Hungarians	Catholic Christianity
Čonoplja	Чонопља	village	3,426	Serbs	Orthodox Christianity
Doroslovo	Дорослово (Hungarian: Doroszló)	village	1,497	Hungarians	Catholic Christianity
Gakovo	Гаково	village	1,810	Serbs	Orthodox Christianity
Kljajićevo	Кљајићево	village	5,045	Serbs	Orthodox Christianity
Kolut	Колут	village	1,327	Serbs	Orthodox Christianity
Rastina	Растина	village	411	Serbs	Orthodox Christianity
Riđica	Риђица	village	2,011	Serbs	Orthodox Christianity
Stanišić	Станишић	village	3,987	Serbs	Orthodox Christianity
Stapar	Стапар	village	3,282	Serbs	Orthodox Christianity
Svetozar Miletić	Светозар Милетић (Hungarian: Nemesmilitics)	village	2,746	Hungarians	Catholic Christianity
Telečka	Телечка (Hungarian: Bácsgyulafalva)	village	1,720	Hungarians	Catholic Christianity
Note: For the inhabited places with Croatian and Hungarian majority or plurality, the names are also given in these languages.

Hamlets and suburbs:

- Bilić (Билић)
- Bukovački Salaši (Буковачки Салаши)
- Kruševlje (Крушевље)
- Lugumerci (Лугумерци)
- Rančevo (Ранчево)
- Žarkovac (Жарковац)

=== Apatin Municipality ===
Settlement	Cyrillic Name Other Names	Type	Population (2011)	Largest ethnic group (2002)	Dominant religion (2002)
Apatin	Апатин	town	17,411	Serbs	Orthodox Christianity
Kupusina	Купусина (Hungarian: Bácskertes)	village	1,952	Hungarians	Catholic Christianity
Prigrevica	Пригревица	village	4,016	Serbs	Orthodox Christianity
Sonta	Сонта (Croatian: Sonta)	village	4,331	Croats	Catholic Christianity
Svilojevo	Свилојево (Hungarian: Szilágyi)	village	1,219	Hungarians	Catholic Christianity
Note: For the inhabited places with Croatian and Hungarian majority, the names are also given in these languages.

Hamlets:

- Staro Selo (Старо Село)
- Veliki Salaš (Велики Салаш)

=== Kula Municipality ===
Settlement	Cyrillic Name Other Names	Type	Population (2011)	Largest ethnic group (2002)	Dominant religion (2002)
Kula	Кула	town	17,866	Serbs	Orthodox Christianity
Crvenka	Црвенка	town	9,001	Serbs	Orthodox Christianity
Kruščić	Крушчић	village	1,852	Serbs	Orthodox Christianity
Lipar	Липар	village	1,482	Serbs	Orthodox Christianity
Nova Crvenka	Нова Црвенка	village	420	Serbs	Orthodox Christianity
Ruski Krstur	Руски Крстур (Rusyn: Руски Керестур)	village	4,585	Rusyns	Greek Catholic Christianity
Sivac	Сивац	village	7,895	Serbs	Orthodox Christianity
Note: For the inhabited place with Rusyn majority or plurality, the name is also given in Rusyn language.

=== Odžaci Municipality ===
Settlement	Cyrillic Name Other Names	Type	Population (2011)	Largest ethnic group (2002)	Dominant religion (2002)
Odžaci	Оџаци	town	8,810	Serbs	Orthodox Christianity
Bački Brestovac	Бачки Брестовац	village	2,819	Serbs	Orthodox Christianity
Bački Gračac	Бачки Грачац	village	2,286	Serbs	Orthodox Christianity
Bogojevo	Богојево (Hungarian: Gombos)	village	1,744	Hungarians	Catholic Christianity
Deronje	Дероње	village	2,487	Serbs	Orthodox Christianity
Karavukovo	Каравуково	village	4,215	Serbs	Orthodox Christianity
Lalić	Лалић (Slovak: Laliť)	village	1,343	Slovaks	Protestantism
Ratkovo	Ратково	village	3,411	Serbs	Orthodox Christianity
Srpski Miletić	Српски Милетић	village	3,038	Serbs	Orthodox Christianity
Note: For the inhabited places with Hungarian and Slovak majority or plurality, the names are also given in these languages.

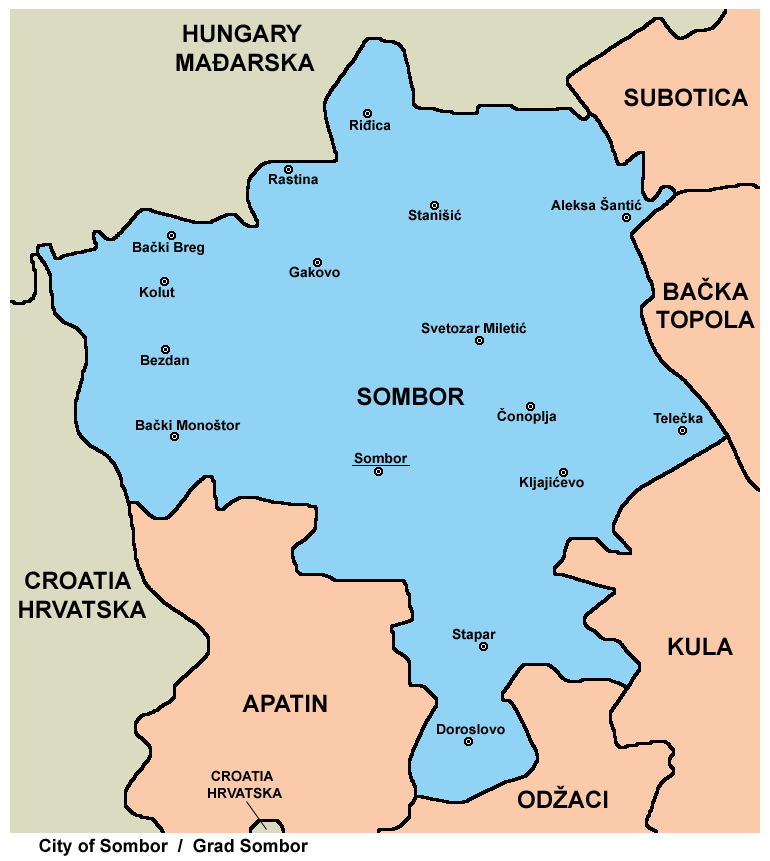
Map of Sombor municipality

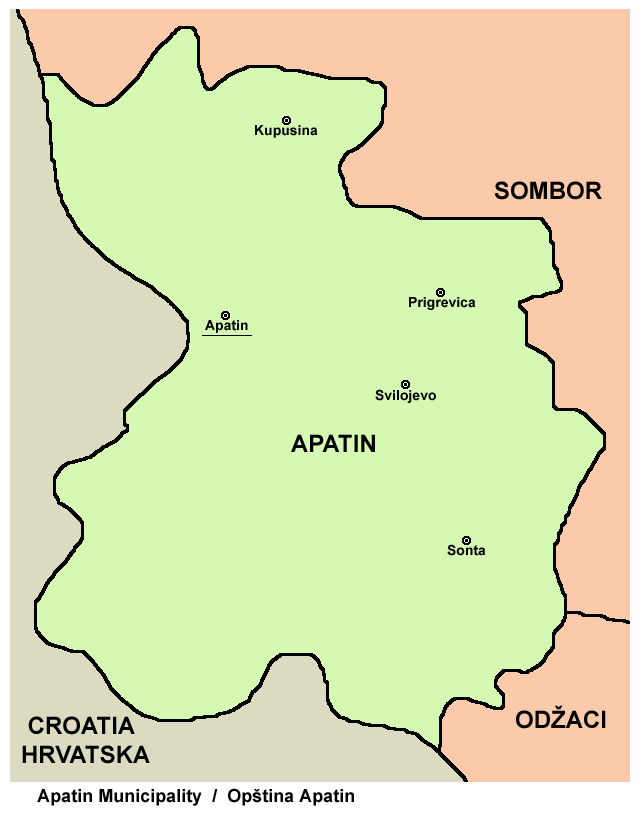
Map of Apatin municipality

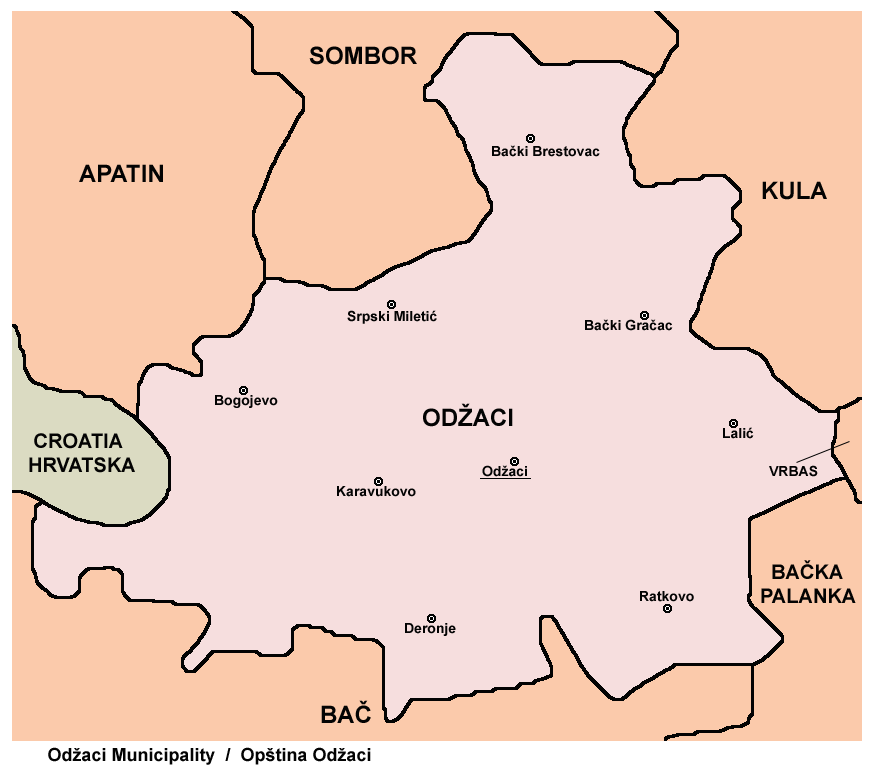
Map of Odžaci municipality

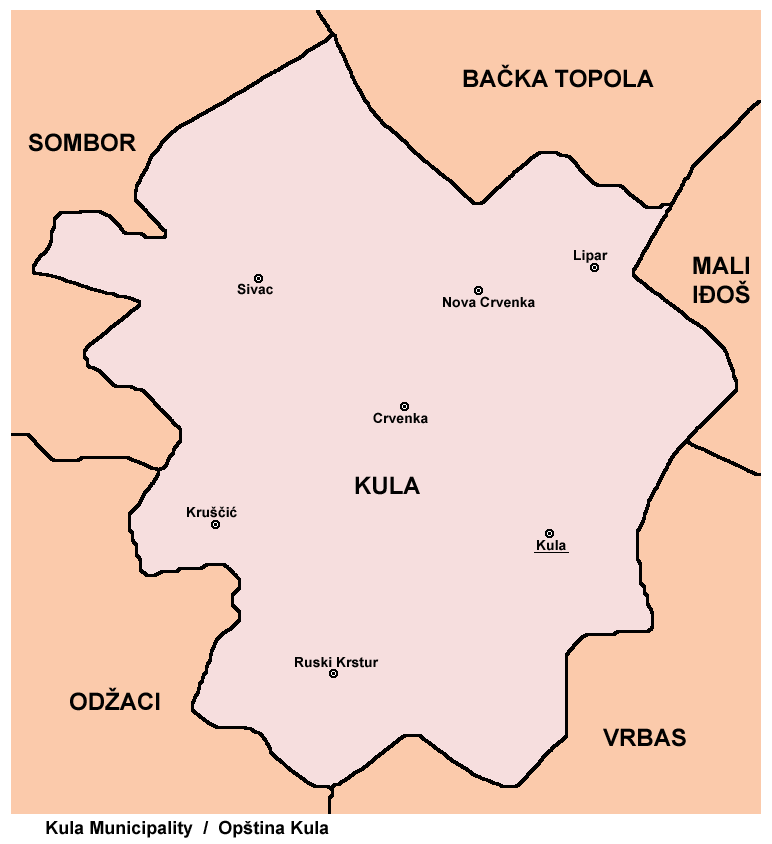
Map of Kula municipality

== The inhabited places of North Bačka District ==
=== City of Subotica ===
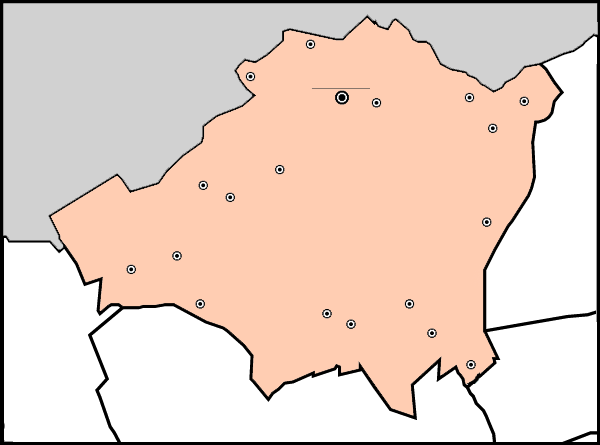

Settlement	Cyrillic Name Other Names	Type	Population (2011)	Largest ethnic group (2002)	Dominant religion (2002)
Subotica	Суботица (Hungarian: Szabadka)	city	97,910	Hungarians	Catholic Christianity
Palić	Палић (Hungarian: Palics)	town	7,771	Hungarians	Catholic Christianity
Bački Vinogradi	Бачки Виногради (Hungarian: Királyhalma)	village	1,922	Hungarians	Catholic Christianity
Bačko Dušanovo	Бачко Душаново (Hungarian: Zentaörs)	village	627	Hungarians	Catholic Christianity
Bajmok	Бајмок	village	7,414	Serbs	Catholic Christianity
Bikovo	Биково (Croatian: Bikovo)	village	1,487	Croats	Catholic Christianity
Čantavir	Чантавир (Hungarian: Csantavér)	village	6,591	Hungarians	Catholic Christianity
Donji Tavankut	Доњи Таванкут (Croatian: Donji Tavankut)	village	2,327	Croats	Catholic Christianity
Đurđin	Ђурђин (Croatian: Đurđin)	village	1,441	Croats	Catholic Christianity
Gornji Tavankut	Горњи Таванкут (Croatian: Gornji Tavankut)	village	1,097	Croats	Catholic Christianity
Hajdukovo	Хајдуково (Hungarian: Hajdújárás)	village	2,313	Hungarians	Catholic Christianity
Kelebija	Келебија (Hungarian: Kelebia)	village	2,142	Hungarians	Catholic Christianity
Ljutovo	Љутово (Bunjevac: Ljutovo)	village	1,067	Bunjevci	Catholic Christianity
Mala Bosna	Мала Босна (Croatian: Mala Bosna)	village	1,082	Croats	Catholic Christianity
Mišićevo	Мишићево	village	377	Serbs	Orthodox Christianity
Novi Žednik	Нови Жедник	village	2,381	Serbs	Orthodox Christianity
Stari Žednik	Стари Жедник (Croatian: Stari Žednik)	village	1,947	Croats	Catholic Christianity
Šupljak	Шупљак (Hungarian: Ludas)	village	1,115	Hungarians	Catholic Christianity
Višnjevac	Вишњевац	village	543	Serbs	Orthodox Christianity
Note: For the inhabited places with Hungarian, Croatian and Bunjevac majority or plurality, the names are also given in these languages.

Hamlets:

- Madaraš (Мадараш)

=== Bačka Topola Municipality ===
Settlement	Cyrillic Name Other Names	Type	Population (2011)	Largest ethnic group (2002)	Dominant religion (2002)
Bačka Topola	Бачка Топола (Hungarian: Topolya)	town	14,573	Hungarians	Catholic Christianity
Bački Sokolac	Бачки Соколац	village	480	Serbs	Orthodox Christianity
Bagremovo	Багремово (Hungarian: Brazília)	village	151	Hungarians	Catholic Christianity
Bajša	Бајша (Hungarian: Bajsa)	village	2,297	Hungarians	Catholic Christianity
Bogaraš	Богараш (Hungarian: Bogaras)	village	83	Hungarians	Catholic Christianity
Gornja Rogatica	Горња Рогатица	village	409	Serbs	Orthodox Christianity
Gunaroš	Гунарош (Hungarian: Gunaras)	village	1,264	Hungarians	Catholic Christianity
Karađorđevo	Карађорђево	village	468	Serbs	Orthodox Christianity
Kavilo	Кавило (Hungarian: Rákóczitelkep)	village	177	Hungarians	Catholic Christianity
Krivaja	Криваја	village	653	Serbs	Orthodox Christianity
Mali Beograd	Мали Београд	village	456	Serbs	Orthodox Christianity
Mićunovo	Мићуново	village	469	Serbs	Orthodox Christianity
Novo Orahovo	Ново Орахово (Hungarian: Zentagunaras)	village	1,768	Hungarians	Catholic Christianity
Njegoševo	Његошево	village	534	Serbs	Orthodox Christianity
Obornjača	Оборњача	village	uninhabited	uninhabited in 2011	uninhabited in 2011
Pačir	Пачир (Hungarian: Pacsér)	village	2,580	Hungarians	Protestantism
Panonija	Панонија	village	607	Serbs	Orthodox Christianity
Pobeda	Победа (Hungarian: Győztes)	village	271	Hungarians	Catholic Christianity
Srednji Salaš	Средњи Салаш	village	104	Serbs	Orthodox Christianity
Stara Moravica	Стара Моравица (Hungarian: Bácskossuthfalva)	village	5,051	Hungarians	Protestantism
Svetićevo	Светићево	village	147	Serbs	Orthodox Christianity
Tomislavci	Томиславци	village	541	Serbs	Orthodox Christianity
Zobnatica	Зобнатица (Hungarian: Zobnaticza)	village	238	Hungarians	Catholic Christianity
Note: For the inhabited places with absolute or relative Hungarian ethnic majority, the names are also given in Hungarian.

=== Mali Iđoš Municipality ===
Settlement	Cyrillic Name Other Names	Type	Population (2011)	Largest ethnic group (2002)	Dominant religion (2002)
Mali Iđoš	Мали Иђош (Hungarian: Kishegyes)	village	4,890	Hungarians	Catholic Christianity
Feketić	Фекетић (Hungarian: Bácsfeketehegy)	village	3,980	Hungarians	Protestantism
Lovćenac	Ловћенац	village	3,161	Serbs	Orthodox Christianity
Note: For the inhabited places with Hungarian majority, the names are also given in Hungarian language.

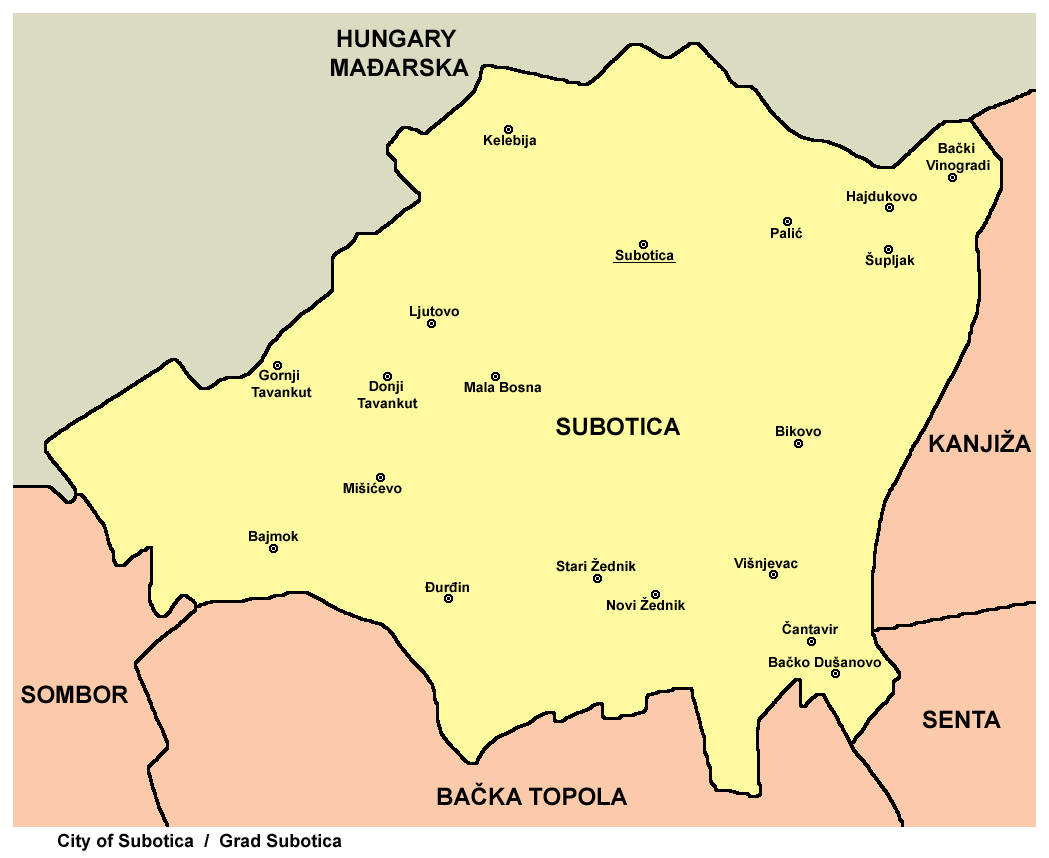
Map of Subotica municipality

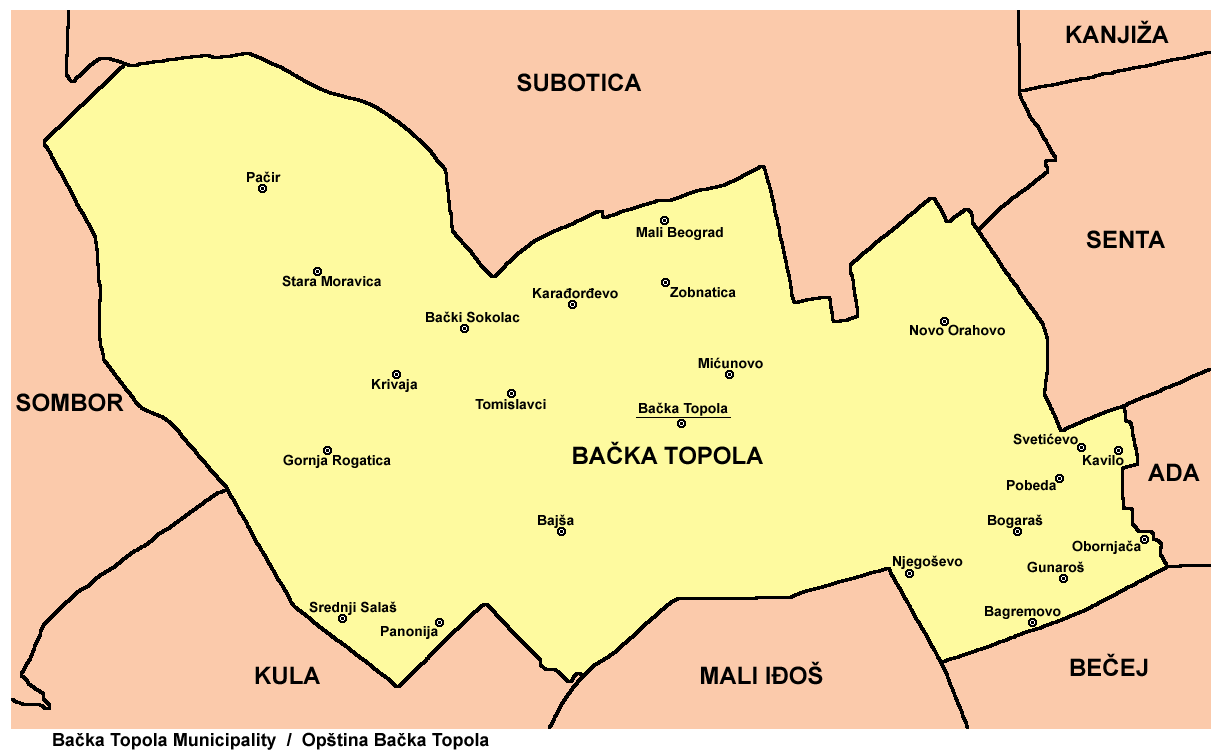
Map of Bačka Topola municipality

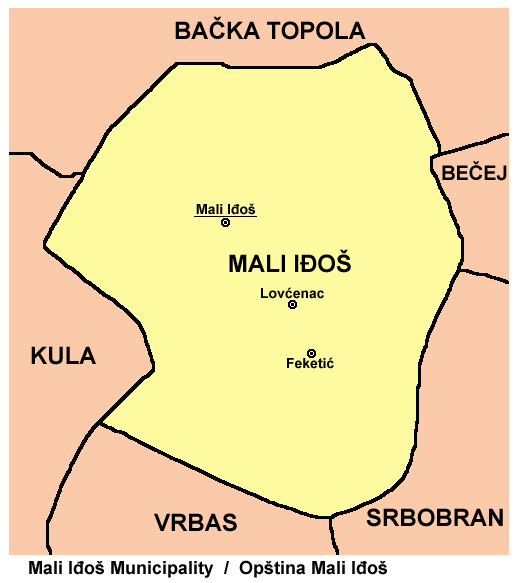
Map of Mali Iđoš municipality

== The inhabited places of North Banat District ==
=== Kikinda municipality ===
Settlement	Cyrillic Name Other Names	Type	Population (2011)	Largest ethnic group (2002)	Dominant religion (2002)
Kikinda	Кикинда	town	38,065	Serbs	Orthodox Christianity
Banatska Topola	Банатска Топола	village	866	Serbs	Orthodox Christianity
Banatsko Veliko Selo	Банатско Велико Село	village	2,512	Serbs	Orthodox Christianity
Bašaid	Башаид	village	3,123	Serbs	Orthodox Christianity
Iđoš	Иђош	village	1,822	Serbs	Orthodox Christianity
Mokrin	Мокрин	village	5,270	Serbs	Orthodox Christianity
Nakovo	Наково	village	1,918	Serbs	Orthodox Christianity
Novi Kozarci	Нови Козарци	village	1,894	Serbs	Orthodox Christianity
Rusko Selo	Руско Село	village	2,813	Serbs	Orthodox Christianity
Sajan	Сајан (Hungarian: Szaján)	village	1,170	Hungarians	Catholic Christianity
Note: For the place with Hungarian ethnic majority, the name is also given in Hungarian.

Hamlets:

- Bikač (Бикач)
- Vincaid (Винцаид)

=== Novi Kneževac municipality ===
Settlement	Cyrillic Name Other Names	Type	Population (2011)	Largest ethnic group (2002)	Dominant religion (2002)
Novi Kneževac	Нови Кнежевац	town	6,960	Serbs	Orthodox Christianity
Banatsko Aranđelovo	Банатско Аранђелово	village	1,398	Serbs	Orthodox Christianity
Đala	Ђала	village	796	Serbs	Orthodox Christianity
Filić	Филић	village	136	Serbs	Orthodox Christianity
Majdan	Мајдан (Hungarian: Magyarmajdány)	village	210	Hungarians	Catholic Christianity
Podlokanj	Подлокањ	village	144	Serbs	Orthodox Christianity
Rabe	Рабе (Hungarian: Rábé)	village	106	Hungarians	Catholic Christianity
Siget	Сигет	village	198	Serbs	Orthodox Christianity
Srpski Krstur	Српски Крстур	village	1,321	Serbs	Orthodox Christianity
Note: For the inhabited places with Hungarian ethnic majority, the names are also given in Hungarian.

=== Čoka municipality ===
Settlement	Cyrillic Name Other Names	Type	Population (2011)	Largest ethnic group (2002)	Dominant religion (2002)
Čoka	Чока (Hungarian: Csóka)	town	4,028	Hungarians	Catholic Christianity
Banatski Monoštor	Банатски Моноштор (Hungarian: Kanizsamonostor)	village	102	Hungarians	Catholic Christianity
Crna Bara	Црна Бара (Hungarian: Feketetó)	village	437	Hungarians	Catholic Christianity
Jazovo	Јазово (Hungarian: Hódegyháza)	village	742	Hungarians	Catholic Christianity
Ostojićevo	Остојићево	village	2,324	Serbs	Orthodox Christianity
Padej	Падеј (Hungarian: Padé)	village	2,376	Hungarians	Catholic Christianity
Sanad	Санад	village	1,151	Serbs	Orthodox Christianity
Vrbica	Врбица (Hungarian: Egyházaskér)	village	238	Hungarians	Catholic Christianity
Note: For the inhabited places with absolute or relative Hungarian ethnic majority, the names are also given in Hungarian.

=== Ada municipality ===
Settlement	Cyrillic Name Other Names	Type	Population (2011)	Largest ethnic group (2002)	Dominant religion (2002)
Ada	Ада (Hungarian: Ada)	town	9,564	Hungarians	Catholic Christianity
Mol	Мол (Hungarian: Mohol)	town	6,009	Hungarians	Catholic Christianity
Obornjača	Оборњача (Hungarian: Völgypart)	village	326	Hungarians	Catholic Christianity
Sterijino	Стеријино (Hungarian: Valkaisor)	village	186	Hungarians	Catholic Christianity
Utrine	Утрине (Hungarian: Törökfalu)	village	906	Hungarians	Catholic Christianity
Note: For the inhabited places with Hungarian ethnic majority, the names are also given in Hungarian.

=== Kanjiža Municipality ===
Settlement	Cyrillic Name Other Names	Type	Population (2011)	Largest ethnic group (2002)	Dominant religion (2002)
Kanjiža	Кањижа (Hungarian: Magyarkanizsa)	town	9,871	Hungarians	Catholic Christianity
Adorjan	Адорјан (Hungarian: Adorján)	village	1,037	Hungarians	Catholic Christianity
Doline	Долине (Hungarian: Völgyes)	village	390	Hungarians	Catholic Christianity
Horgoš	Хоргош (Hungarian: Horgos)	village	5,709	Hungarians	Catholic Christianity
Male Pijace	Мале Пијаце (Hungarian: Kispiac)	village	1,811	Hungarians	Catholic Christianity
Mali Pesak	Мали Песак (Hungarian: Kishomok)	village	94	Hungarians	Catholic Christianity
Martonoš	Мартонош (Hungarian: Martonos)	village	1,988	Hungarians	Catholic Christianity
Novo Selo	Ново Село (Hungarian: Újfalu)	village	157	Hungarians	Catholic Christianity
Orom	Ором (Hungarian: Orom)	village	1,423	Hungarians	Catholic Christianity
Totovo Selo	Тотово Село (Hungarian: Tóthfalu)	village	618	Hungarians	Catholic Christianity
Trešnjevac	Трешњевац (Hungarian: Oromhegyes)	village	1,724	Hungarians	Catholic Christianity
Velebit	Велебит	village	277	Serbs	Orthodox Christianity
Vojvoda Zimonić	Војвода Зимонић (Hungarian: Ilonafalu)	village	244	Hungarians	Catholic Christianity
Note: For the inhabited places with Hungarian ethnic majority, the names are also given in Hungarian.

=== Senta Municipality ===
Settlement	Cyrillic Name Other Names	Type	Population (2011)	Largest ethnic group (2002)	Dominant religion (2002)
Senta	Сента (Hungarian: Zenta)	town	18,704	Hungarians	Catholic Christianity
Bogaraš	Богараш (Hungarian: Bogaras)	village	568	Hungarians	Catholic Christianity
Gornji Breg	Горњи Брег (Hungarian: Felsőhegy)	village	1,726	Hungarians	Catholic Christianity
Kevi	Кеви (Hungarian: Kevi)	village	726	Hungarians	Catholic Christianity
Tornjoš	Торњош (Hungarian: Tornyos)	village	1,592	Hungarians	Catholic Christianity
Note: For the inhabited places with Hungarian ethnic majority, the names are also given in Hungarian.

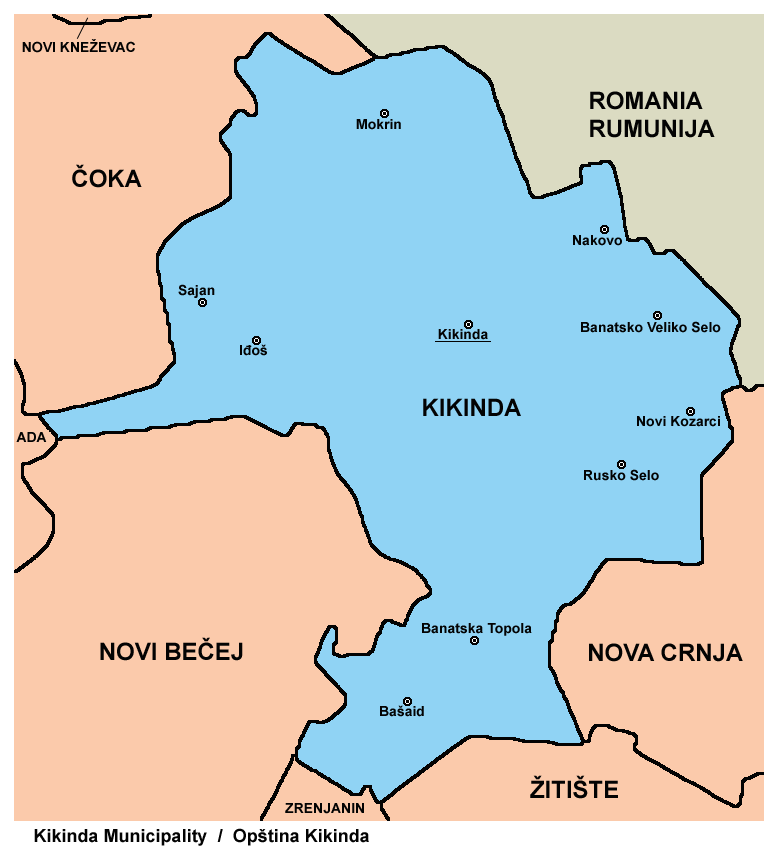
Map of Kikinda municipality

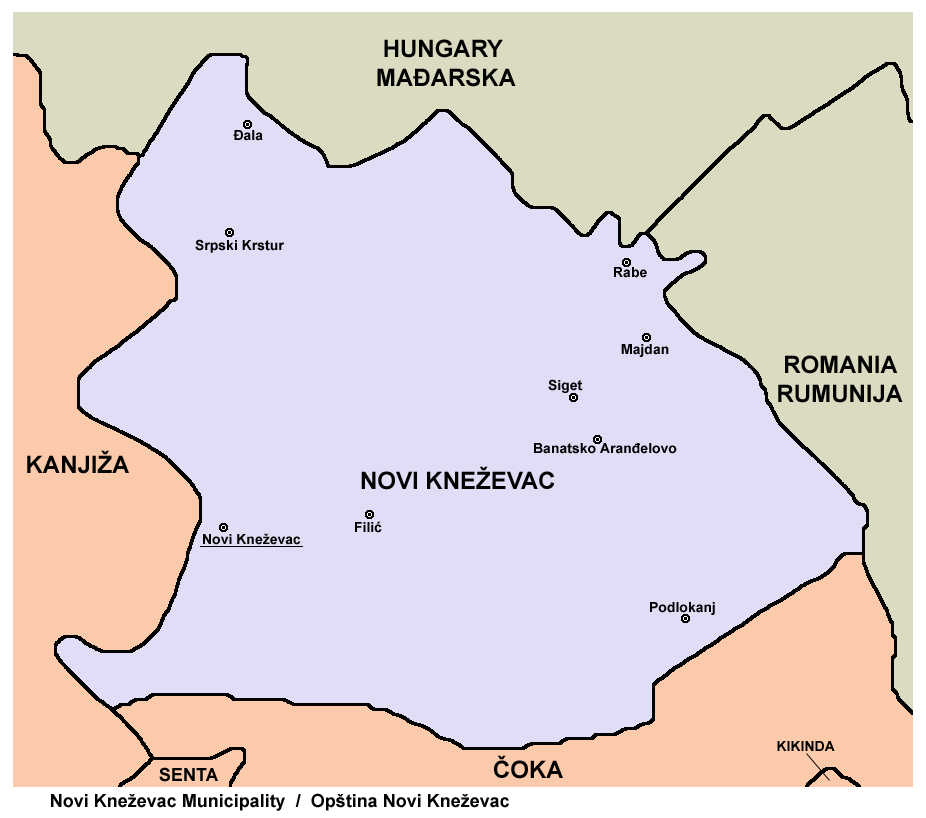
Map of Novi Kneževac municipality

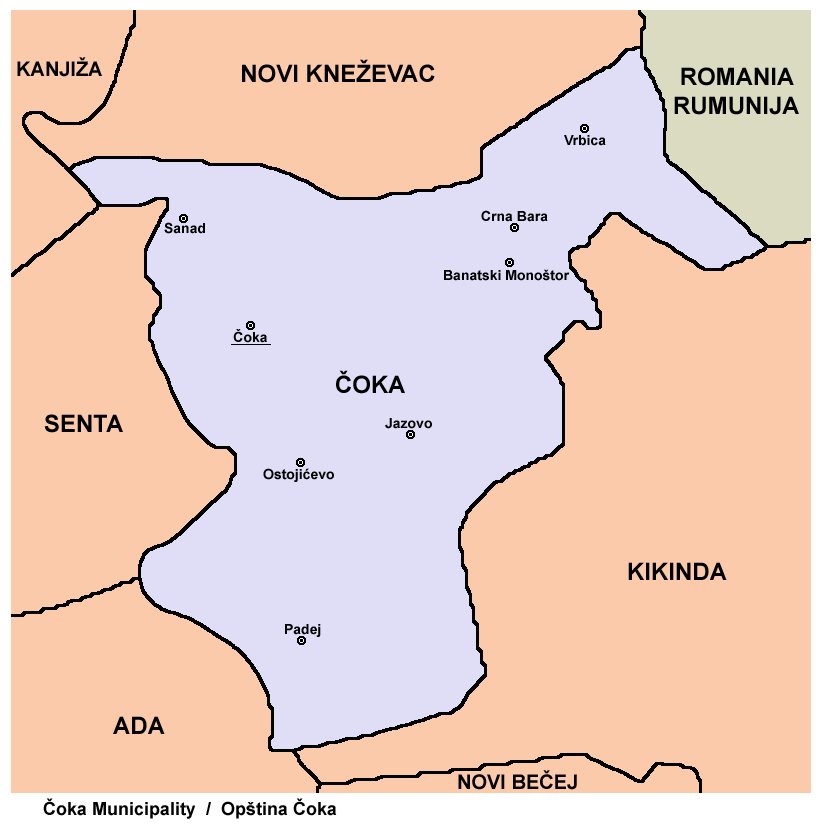
Map of Čoka municipality

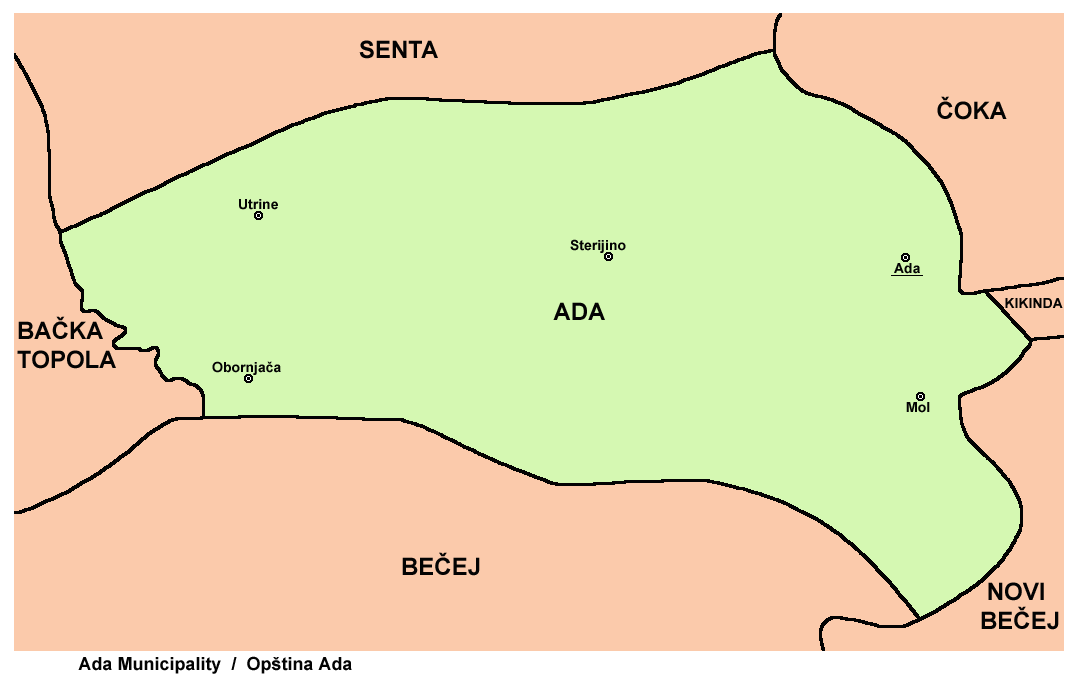
Map of Ada municipality

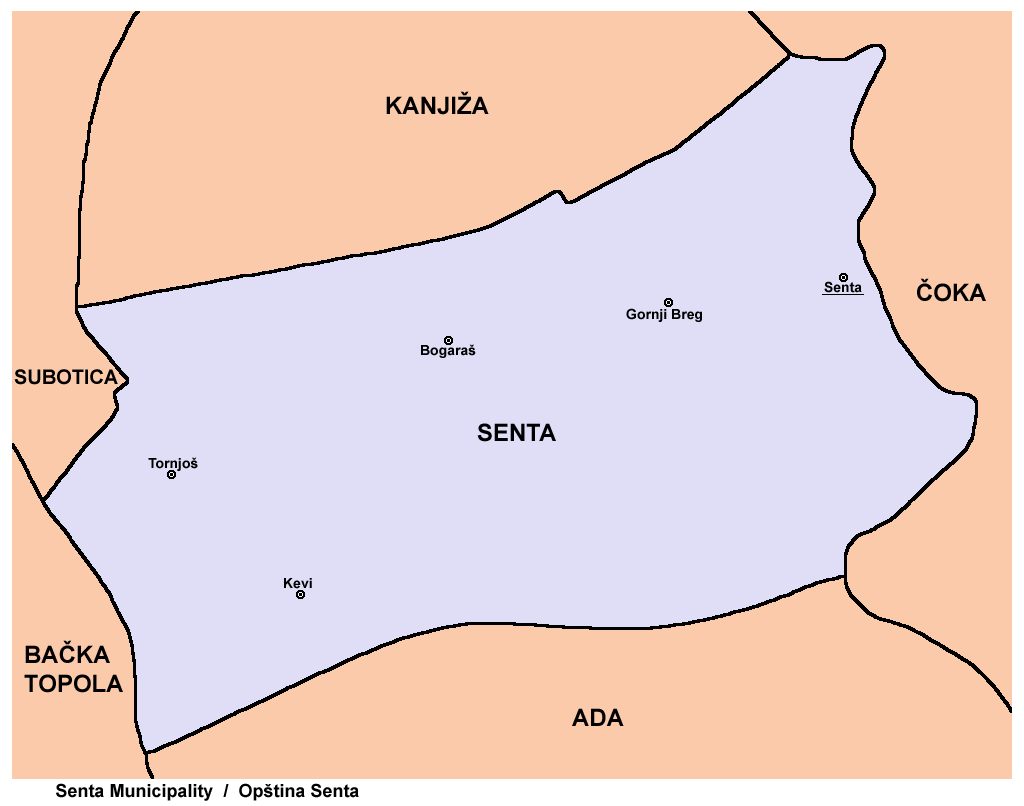
Map of Senta municipality

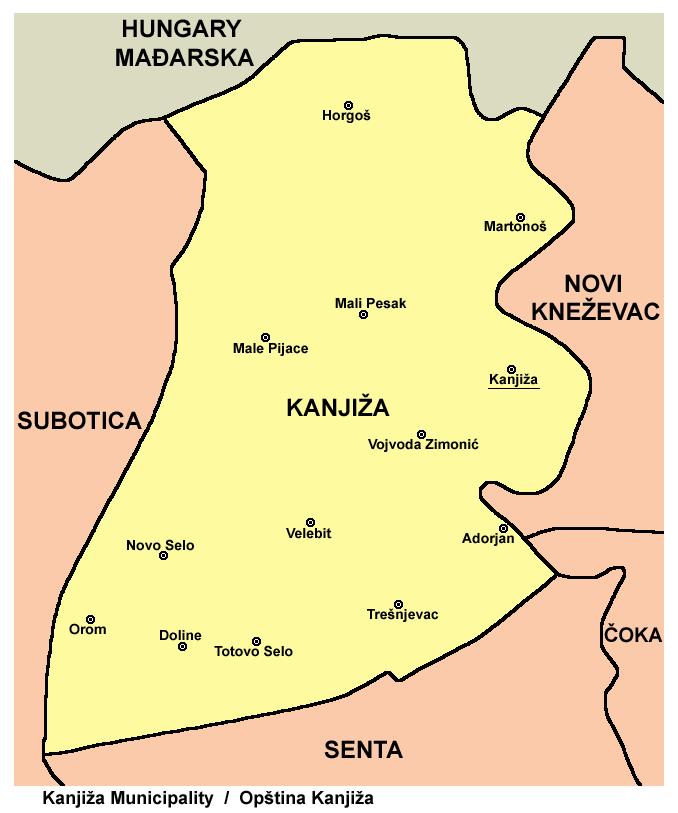
Map of Kanjiža municipality

== The inhabited places of Central Banat District ==
=== City of Zrenjanin ===
Settlement	Cyrillic Name Other Names	Type	Population (2011)	Largest ethnic group (2002)	Dominant religion (2002)
Zrenjanin	Зрењанин	city	76,511	Serbs	Orthodox Christianity
Aradac	Арадац	village	3,335	Serbs	Orthodox Christianity
Banatski Despotovac	Банатски Деспотовац	village	1,291	Serbs	Orthodox Christianity
Belo Blato	Бело Блато (Slovak: Biele Blato)	village	1,342	Slovaks	Catholic Christianity
Botoš	Ботош	village	1,860	Serbs	Orthodox Christianity
Čenta	Чента	village	3,050	Serbs	Orthodox Christianity
Ečka	Ечка	village	3,999	Serbs	Orthodox Christianity
Elemir	Елемир	village	4,338	Serbs	Orthodox Christianity
Farkaždin	Фаркаждин	village	1,179	Serbs	Orthodox Christianity
Jankov Most	Јанков Мост (Romanian: Iancăid)	village	530	Romanians	Orthodox Christianity
Klek	Клек	village	2,706	Serbs	Orthodox Christianity
Knićanin	Книћанин	village	1,753	Serbs	Orthodox Christianity
Lazarevo	Лазарево	village	2,877	Serbs	Orthodox Christianity
Lukićevo	Лукићево	village	1,804	Serbs	Orthodox Christianity
Lukino Selo	Лукино Село (Hungarian: Lukácsfalva)	village	498	Hungarians	Catholic Christianity
Melenci	Меленци	village	5,982	Serbs	Orthodox Christianity
Mihajlovo	Михајлово (Hungarian: Magyarszentmihály)	village	948	Hungarians	Catholic Christianity
Orlovat	Орловат	village	1,516	Serbs	Orthodox Christianity
Perlez	Перлез	village	3,383	Serbs	Orthodox Christianity
Stajićevo	Стајићево	village	1,941	Serbs	Orthodox Christianity
Taraš	Тараш	village	1,009	Serbs	Orthodox Christianity
Tomaševac	Томашевац	village	1,510	Serbs	Orthodox Christianity
Note: For the inhabited places with Hungarian, Romanian or Slovak majority or plurality, the names are also given in these languages.

Hamlets:

- Zlatica (Златица)

=== Novi Bečej Municipality ===
Settlement	Cyrillic Name	Type	Population (2011)	Largest ethnic group (2002)	Dominant religion (2002)
Novi Bečej	Нови Бечеј	town	13,133	Serbs	Orthodox Christianity
Bočar	Бочар	village	1,488	Serbs	Orthodox Christianity
Kumane	Кумане	village	3,284	Serbs	Orthodox Christianity
Novo Miloševo	Ново Милошево	village	6,020	Serbs	Orthodox Christianity

=== Nova Crnja Municipality ===
Settlement	Cyrillic Name Other Names	Type	Population (2011)	Largest ethnic group (2002)	Dominant religion (2002)
Nova Crnja	Нова Црња (Hungarian: Magyarcsernye)	village	1,509	Hungarians	Catholic Christianity
Aleksandrovo	Александрово	village	2,130	Serbs	Orthodox Christianity
Radojevo	Радојево	village	1,056	Serbs	Orthodox Christianity
Srpska Crnja	Српска Црња	village	3,685	Serbs	Orthodox Christianity
Toba	Тоба (Hungarian: Tóba)	village	518	Hungarians	Catholic Christianity
Vojvoda Stepa	Војвода Степа	village	1,374	Serbs	Orthodox Christianity
Note: For the inhabited places with Hungarian ethnic majority, the names are also given in Hungarian.

=== Žitište Municipality ===
Settlement	Cyrillic Name Other Names	Type	Population (2011)	Largest ethnic group (2002)	Dominant religion (2002)
Žitište	Житиште	town	2,898	Serbs	Orthodox Christianity
Banatski Dvor	Банатски Двор	village	1,095	Serbs	Orthodox Christianity
Banatsko Karađorđevo	Банатско Карађорђево	village	2,091	Serbs	Orthodox Christianity
Banatsko Višnjićevo	Банатско Вишњићево	village	258	Serbs	Orthodox Christianity
Čestereg	Честерег	village	1,113	Serbs	Orthodox Christianity
Hetin	Хетин (Hungarian: Hetény)	village	537	Hungarians	Catholic Christianity
Međa	Међа	village	838	Serbs	Orthodox Christianity
Novi Itebej	Нови Итебеј (Hungarian: Magyarittabé)	village	1,147	Hungarians	Protestantism
Ravni Topolovac	Равни Тополовац	village	1,137	Serbs	Orthodox Christianity
Srpski Itebej	Српски Итебеј	village	1,969	Serbs	Orthodox Christianity
Torak	Торак (Romanian: Torac)	village	2,291	Romanians	Orthodox Christianity
Torda	Торда (Hungarian: Torda)	village	1,462	Hungarians	Catholic Christianity
Note: For the inhabited places with Hungarian or Romanian majority, the names are also given in these languages.

=== Sečanj Municipality ===
Settlement	Cyrillic Name Other Names	Type	Population (2011)	Largest ethnic group (2002)	Dominant religion (2002)
Sečanj	Сечањ	village	2,107	Serbs	Orthodox Christianity
Jaša Tomić	Јаша Томић	town	2,373	Serbs	Orthodox Christianity
Banatska Dubica	Банатска Дубица	village	324	Serbs	Orthodox Christianity
Boka	Бока	village	1,412	Serbs	Orthodox Christianity
Busenje	Бусење (Hungarian: Káptalanfalva)	village	63	Hungarians	Catholic Christianity
Jarkovac	Јарковац	village	1.505	Serbs	Orthodox Christianity
Konak	Конак	village	777	Serbs	Catholic Christianity
Krajišnik	Крајишник	village	1,719	Serbs	Orthodox Christianity
Neuzina	Неузина	village	1,256	Serbs	Orthodox Christianity
Sutjeska	Сутјеска	village	1,478	Serbs	Orthodox Christianity
Šurjan	Шурјан	village	253	Serbs	Orthodox Christianity
Note: For the place with Hungarian ethnic majority, the name is also given in Hungarian.

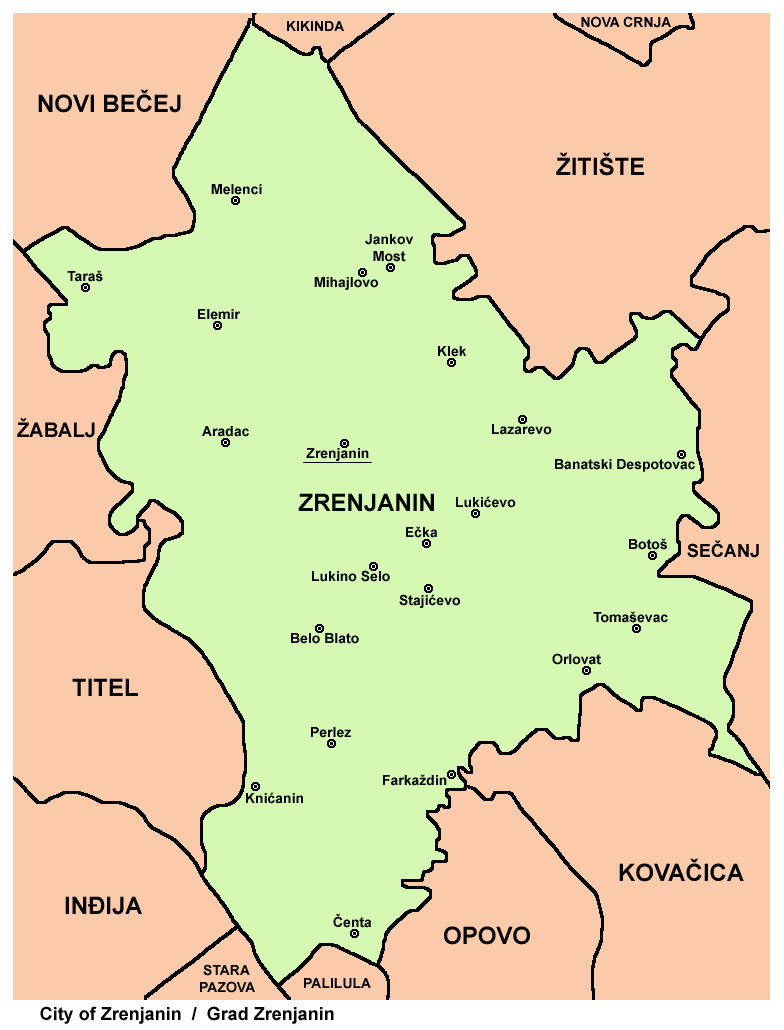
Map of Zrenjanin municipality

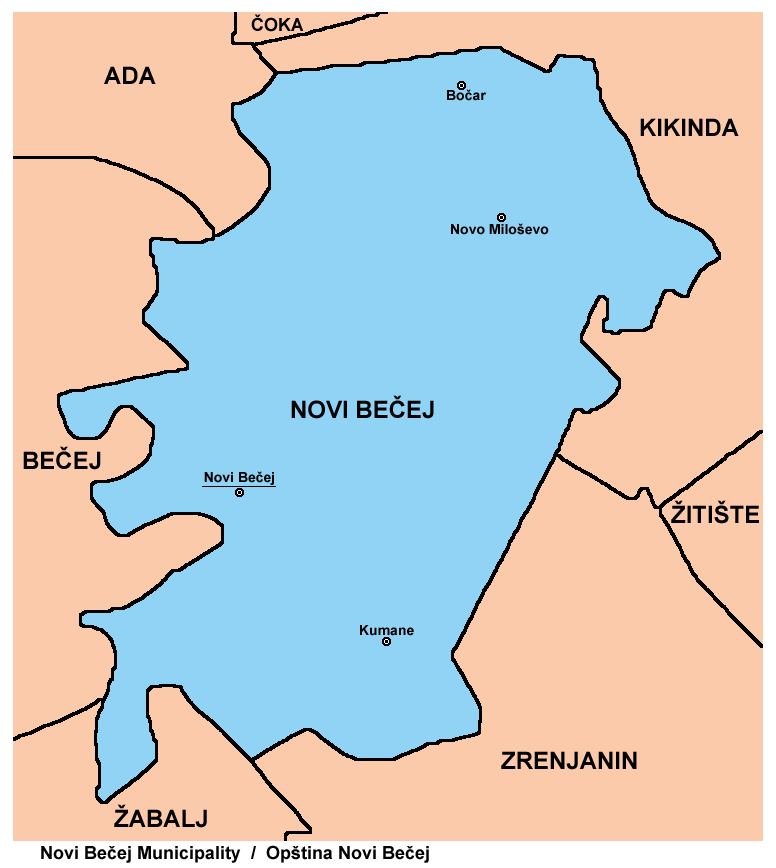
Map of Novi Bečej municipality

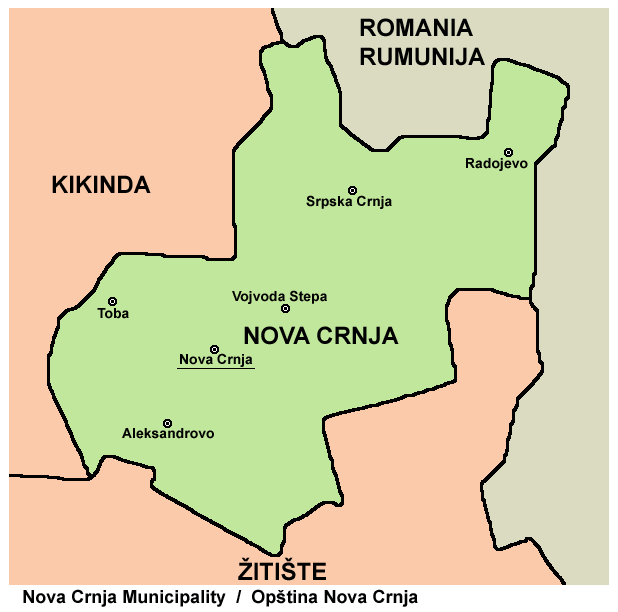
Map of Nova Crnja municipality

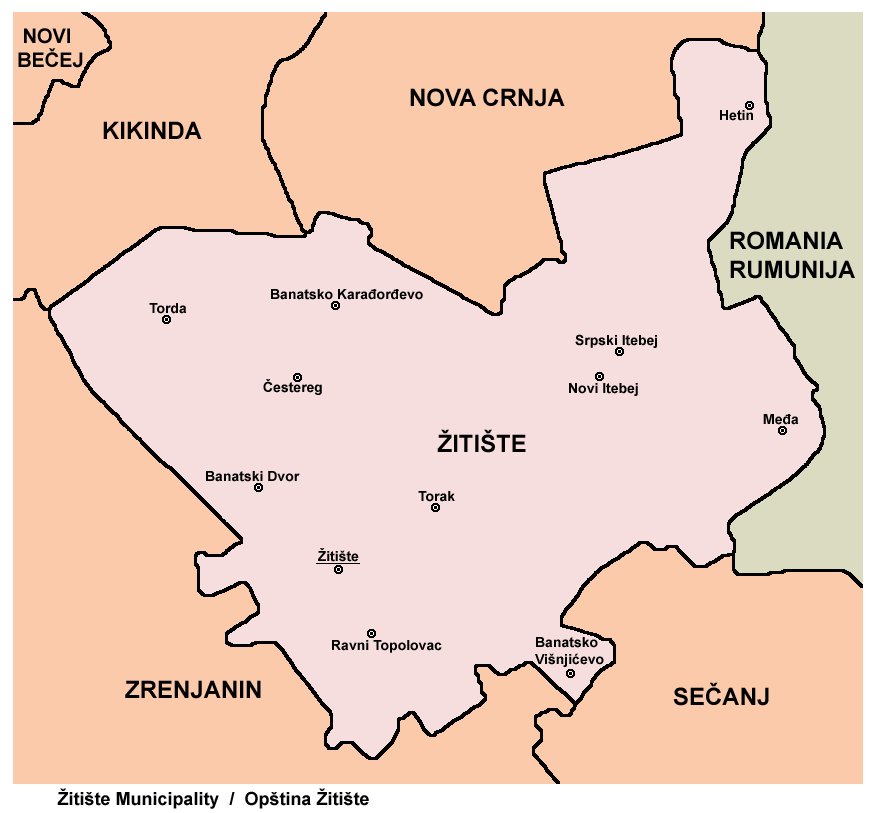
Map of Žitište municipality

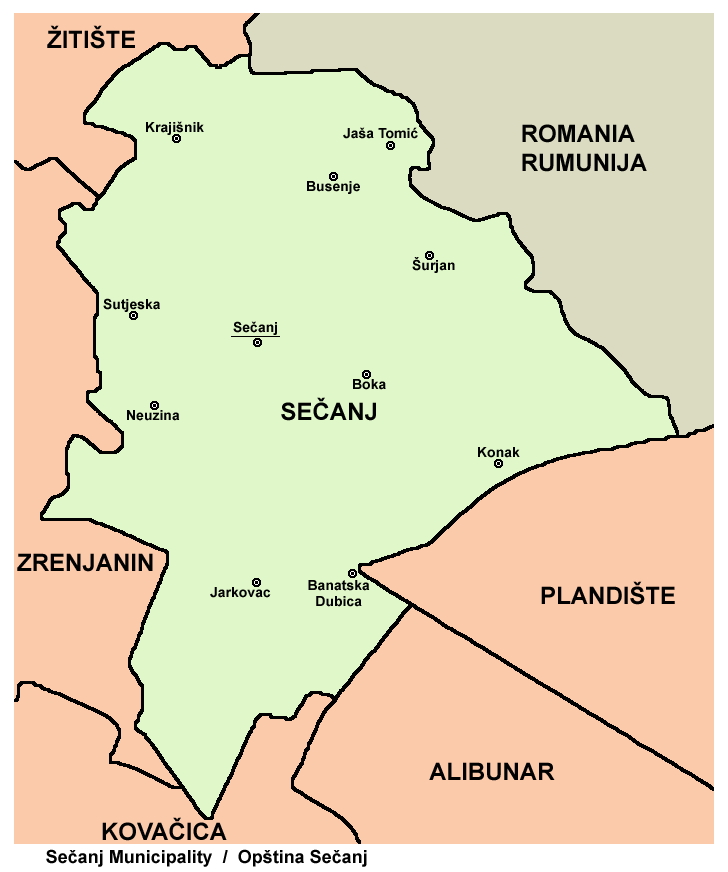
Map of Sečanj municipality

== The inhabited places of South Banat District ==
=== City of Pančevo ===
Settlement	Cyrillic Name Other Names	Type	Population (2011)	Largest ethnic group (2002)	Dominant religion (2002)
Pančevo	Панчево	city	76,203	Serbs	Orthodox Christianity
Kačarevo	Качарево	town	7,100	Serbs	Orthodox Christianity
Starčevo	Старчево	town	7,473	Serbs	Orthodox Christianity
Banatski Brestovac	Банатски Брестовац	village	3,251	Serbs	Orthodox Christianity
Banatsko Novo Selo	Банатско Ново Село	village	6,686	Serbs	Orthodox Christianity
Dolovo	Долово	village	6,146	Serbs	Orthodox Christianity
Glogonj	Глогоњ	village	3,012	Serbs	Orthodox Christianity
Ivanovo	Иваново (Hungarian: Sándoregyháza)	village	1,053	Hungarians	Catholic Christianity
Jabuka	Јабука	village	6,181	Serbs	Orthodox Christianity
Omoljica	Омољица	village	6,309	Serbs	Orthodox Christianity
Note: For the place with Hungarian ethnic plurality, the name is also given in Hungarian.

=== Kovin Municipality ===
Settlement	Cyrillic Name Other Names	Type	Population (2011)	Largest ethnic group (2002)	Dominant religion (2002)
Kovin	Ковин	town	13,499	Serbs	Orthodox Christianity
Bavanište	Баваниште	village	5,820	Serbs	Orthodox Christianity
Deliblato	Делиблато	village	2,939	Serbs	Orthodox Christianity
Dubovac	Дубовац	village	1,188	Serbs	Orthodox Christianity
Gaj	Гај	village	2,929	Serbs	Orthodox Christianity
Malo Bavanište	Мало Баваниште	village	332	Serbs	Orthodox Christianity
Mramorak	Мраморак	village	2,690	Serbs	Orthodox Christianity
Pločica	Плочица	village	1,794	Serbs	Orthodox Christianity
Skorenovac	Скореновац (Hungarian: Székelykeve)	village	2,354	Hungarians	Catholic Christianity
Šumarak	Шумарак (Hungarian: Emánueltelep)	village	161	Hungarians	Catholic Christianity
Note: For the places with Hungarian ethnic majority or plurality, the names are also given in Hungarian.

=== Opovo Municipality ===
Settlement	Cyrillic Name	Type	Population (2011)	Largest ethnic group (2002)	Dominant religion (2002)
Opovo	Опово	town	4,527	Serbs	Orthodox Christianity
Baranda	Баранда	village	1,544	Serbs	Orthodox Christianity
Sakule	Сакуле	village	1,847	Serbs	Orthodox Christianity
Sefkerin	Сефкерин	village	2,522	Serbs	Orthodox Christianity

=== Kovačica Municipality ===
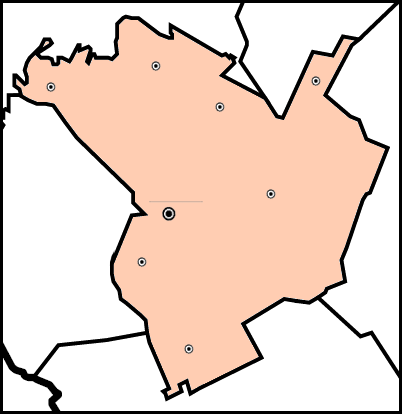

Settlement	Cyrillic Name Other Names	Type	Population (2011)	Largest ethnic group (2002)	Dominant religion (2002)
Kovačica	Ковачица (Slovak: Kovačica)	town	6,259	Slovaks	Protestantism
Crepaja	Црепаја	village	4,364	Serbs	Orthodox Christianity
Debeljača	Дебељача (Hungarian: Torontálvásárhely)	village	4,913	Hungarians	Protestantism
Idvor	Идвор	village	974	Serbs	Orthodox Christianity
Padina	Падина (Slovak: Padina)	village	5,531	Slovaks	Protestantism
Putnikovo	Путниково	village	200	Serbs	Orthodox Christianity
Samoš	Самош	village	1,004	Serbs	Orthodox Christianity
Uzdin	Уздин (Romanian: Uzdâni)	village	2,029	Romanians	Orthodox Christianity
Note: For the inhabited places with Slovak, Hungarian or Romanian majority, the names are also given in these languages.

=== Alibunar Municipality ===
Settlement	Cyrillic Name Other Names	Type	Population (2011)	Largest ethnic group (2002)	Dominant religion (2002)
Alibunar	Алибунар	town	2,883	Serbs	Orthodox Christianity
Banatski Karlovac	Банатски Карловац	town	5,082	Serbs	Orthodox Christianity
Dobrica	Добрица	village	1,076	Serbs	Orthodox Christianity
Ilandža	Иланџа	village	1,422	Serbs	Orthodox Christianity
Janošik	Јаношик (Slovak: Jánošík)	village	966	Slovaks	Protestantism
Lokve	Локве (Romanian: Locve)	village	1,772	Romanians	Orthodox Christianity
Nikolinci	Николинци (Romanian: Nicolinţ)	village	1,131	Romanians	Orthodox Christianity
Novi Kozjak	Нови Козјак	village	636	Serbs	Orthodox Christianity
Seleuš	Селеуш (Romanian: Seleuş)	village	1,191	Romanians	Orthodox Christianity
Vladimirovac	Владимировац	village	3,868	Serbs	Orthodox Christianity
Note: For the inhabited places with Romanian or Slovak majority or plurality, the names are also given in these languages.

Hamlets:

- Novi Vladimirovac
- Devojački Bunar

=== Plandište Municipality ===
Settlement	Cyrillic Name Other Names	Type	Population (2011)	Largest ethnic group (2002)	Dominant religion (2002)
Plandište	Пландиште	village	3,825	Serbs	Orthodox Christianity
Banatski Sokolac	Банатски Соколац	village	272	Serbs	Orthodox Christianity
Barice	Барице (Romanian: Sân-Ianăş)	village	516	Romanians	Orthodox Christianity
Dužine	Дужине	village	147	Serbs	Orthodox Christianity
Hajdučica	Хајдучица (Slovak: Hajdušica)	village	1,150	Slovaks	Protestantism
Jermenovci	Јерменовци (Hungarian: Ürményháza)	village	905	Hungarians	Catholic Christianity
Kupinik	Купиник	village	238	Serbs	Orthodox Christianity
Laudonovac	Лаудоновац	village	21	Serbs	Orthodox Christianity
Margita	Маргита	village	924	Serbs	Orthodox Christianity
Markovićevo	Марковићево	village	160	Serbs	Orthodox Christianity
Miletićevo	Милетићево	village	497	Serbs	Orthodox Christianity
Stari Lec	Стари Лец	village	963	Serbs	undeclared
Velika Greda	Велика Греда	village	1,158	Serbs	Orthodox Christianity
Veliki Gaj	Велики Гај	village	560	Serbs	Orthodox Christianity
Note: For the inhabited places with Romanian, Hungarian or Slovak majority or plurality, the names are also given in these languages.

=== Vršac Municipality ===
Settlement	Cyrillic Name Other Names	Type	Population (2011)	Largest ethnic group (2002)	Dominant religion (2002)
Vršac	Вршац	town	36,040	Serbs	Orthodox Christianity
Gudurica	Гудурица	village	1,094	Serbs	Orthodox Christianity
Izbište	Избиште	village	1,472	Serbs	Orthodox Christianity
Jablanka	Јабланка (Romanian: Iablanca)	village	251	Romanians	Orthodox Christianity
Kuštilj	Куштиљ (Romanian: Coştei)	village	748	Romanians	Orthodox Christianity
Mali Žam	Мали Жам (Romanian: Jamu Mic)	village	283	Romanians	Orthodox Christianity
Malo Središte	Мало Средиште (Romanian: Srediştea Mică)	village	89	Romanians	Orthodox Christianity
Markovac	Марковац (Romanian: Marcovăţ)	village	255	Romanians	Orthodox Christianity
Mesić	Месић (Romanian: Mesici)	village	198	Romanians	Orthodox Christianity
Orešac	Орешац (Romanian: Oreşaţ)	village	382	Romanians	Orthodox Christianity
Parta	Парта	village	376	Serbs	Orthodox Christianity
Pavliš	Павлиш	village	2,195	Serbs	Orthodox Christianity
Potporanj	Потпорањ	village	272	Serbs	Orthodox Christianity
Ritiševo	Ритишево (Romanian: Râtişor)	village	549	Romanians	Orthodox Christianity
Sočica	Сочица (Romanian: Sălciţa)	village	133	Romanians	Orthodox Christianity
Straža	Стража (Romanian: Straja)	village	531	Romanians	Orthodox Christianity
Šušara	Шушара (Hungarian: Fejértelep)	village	333	Hungarians	Catholic Christianity
Uljma	Уљма	village	3,269	Serbs	Orthodox Christianity
Vatin	Ватин	village	238	Serbs	Orthodox Christianity
Veliko Središte	Велико Средиште	village	1,270	Serbs	Orthodox Christianity
Vlajkovac	Влајковац	village	1,148	Serbs	Orthodox Christianity
Vojvodinci	Војводинци (Romanian: Voivodinţ)	village	363	Romanians	Orthodox Christianity
Vršački Ritovi	Вршачки Ритови	village	37	Serbs	Orthodox Christianity
Zagajica	Загајица	village	500	Serbs	Orthodox Christianity
Note: For the inhabited places with Romanian or Hungarian majority or plurality, the names are also given in these languages.

=== Bela Crkva Municipality ===
Settlement	Cyrillic Name Other Names	Type	Population (2011)	Largest ethnic group (2002)	Dominant religion (2002)
Bela Crkva	Бела Црква	town	9,080	Serbs	Orthodox Christianity
Banatska Palanka	Банатска Паланка	village	682	Serbs	Orthodox Christianity
Banatska Subotica	Банатска Суботица	village	169	Serbs	Orthodox Christianity
Crvena Crkva	Црвена Црква	village	666	Serbs	Orthodox Christianity
Češko Selo	Чешко Село (Czech: Češko Selo)	village	40	Czechs	Catholic Christianity
Dobričevo	Добричево (Hungarian: Udvardszállás)	village	199	Hungarians	Catholic Christianity
Dupljaja	Дупљаја	village	738	Serbs	Orthodox Christianity
Grebenac	Гребенац (Romanian: Grebenaţ)	village	818	Romanians	Orthodox Christianity
Jasenovo	Јасеново	village	1,243	Serbs	Orthodox Christianity
Kajtasovo	Кајтасово	village	262	Serbs	Orthodox Christianity
Kaluđerovo	Калуђерово	village	94	Serbs	Orthodox Christianity
Kruščica	Крушчица	village	864	Serbs	Orthodox Christianity
Kusić	Кусић	village	1,164	Serbs	Orthodox Christianity
Vračev Gaj	Врачев Гај	village	1,348	Serbs	Orthodox Christianity
Note: For the inhabited places with Romanian, Hungarian or Czech majority, the names are also given in these languages.

Hamlets:

- Stara Palanka
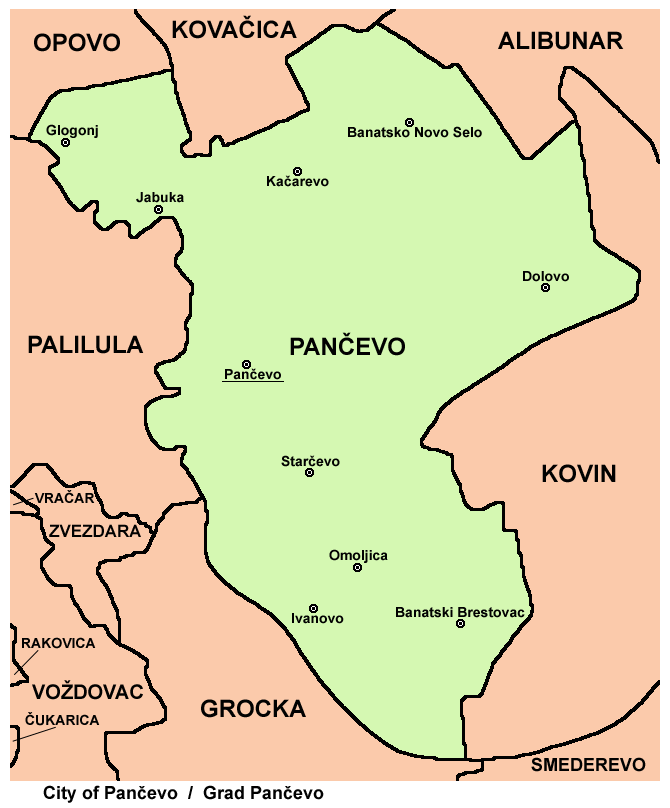
Map of city of Pančevo

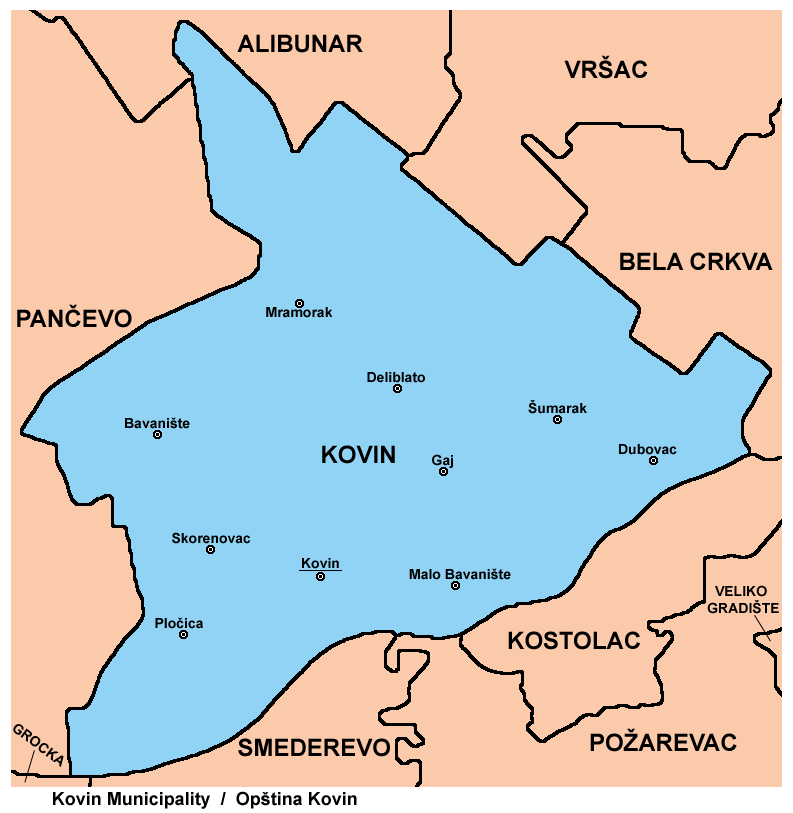
Map of Kovin municipality

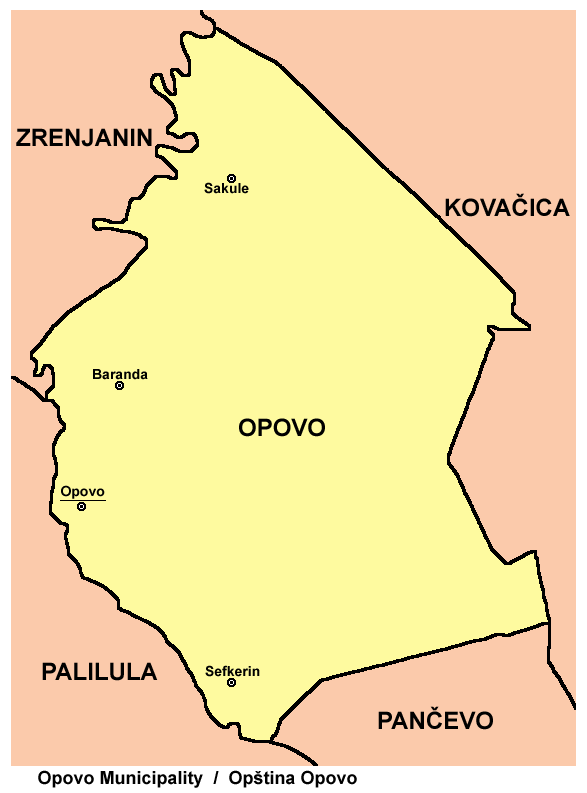
Map of Opovo municipality

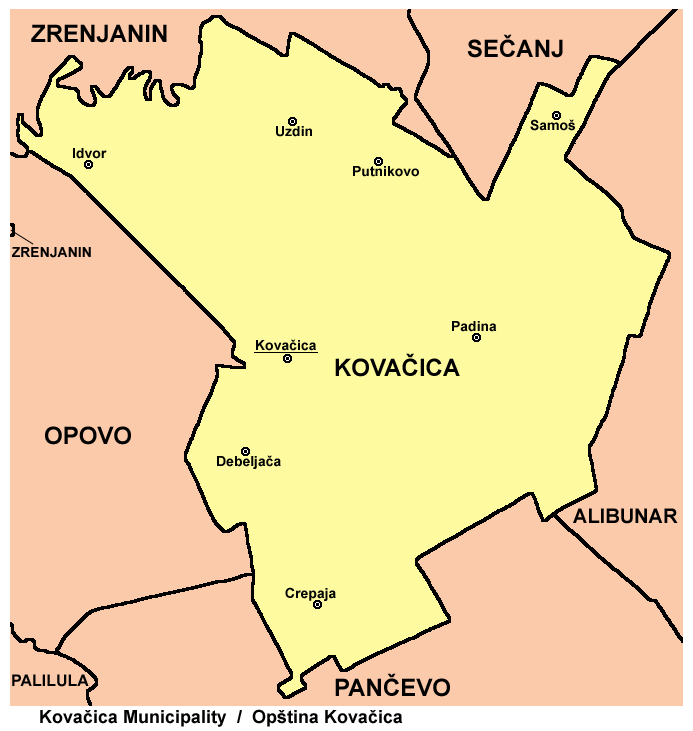
Map of Kovačica municipality

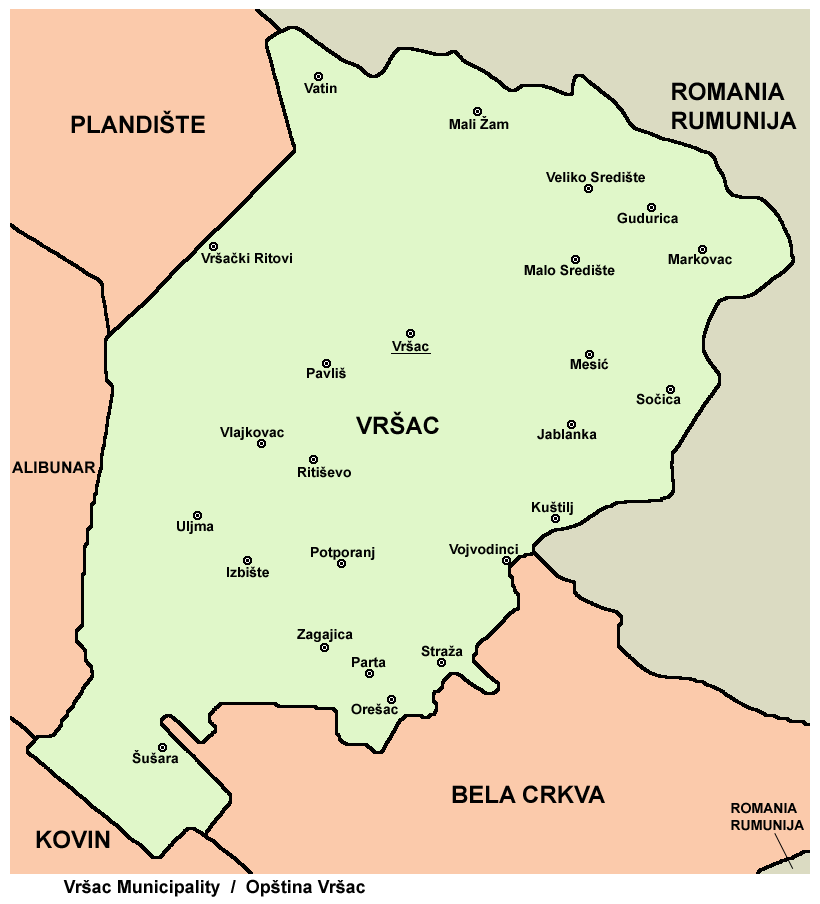
Map of Vršac municipality

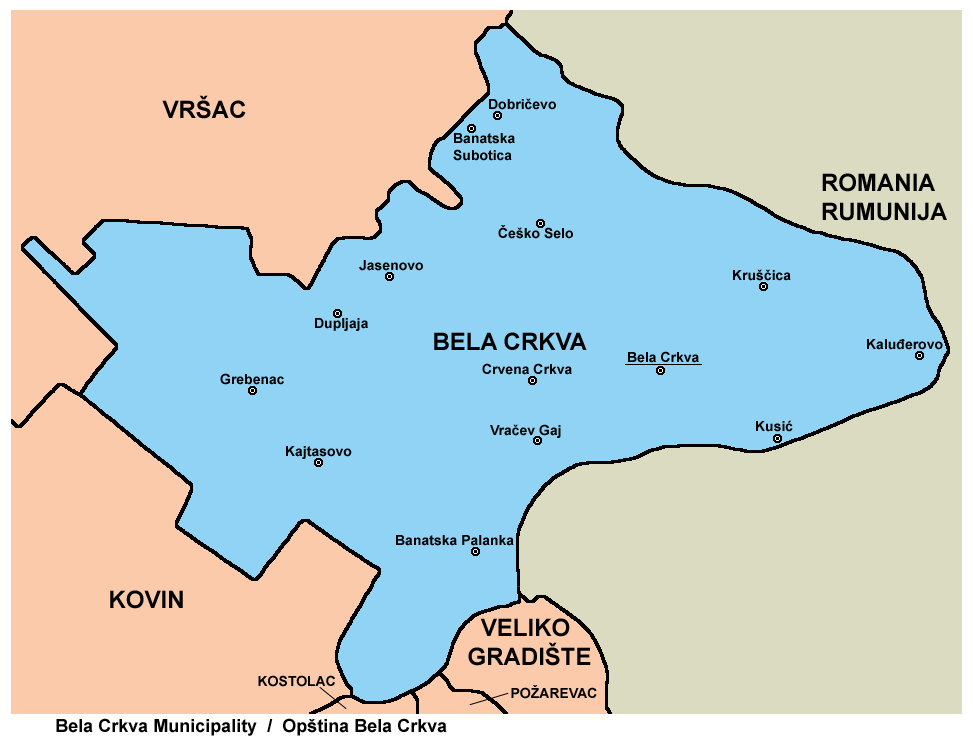
Map of Bela Crkva municipality

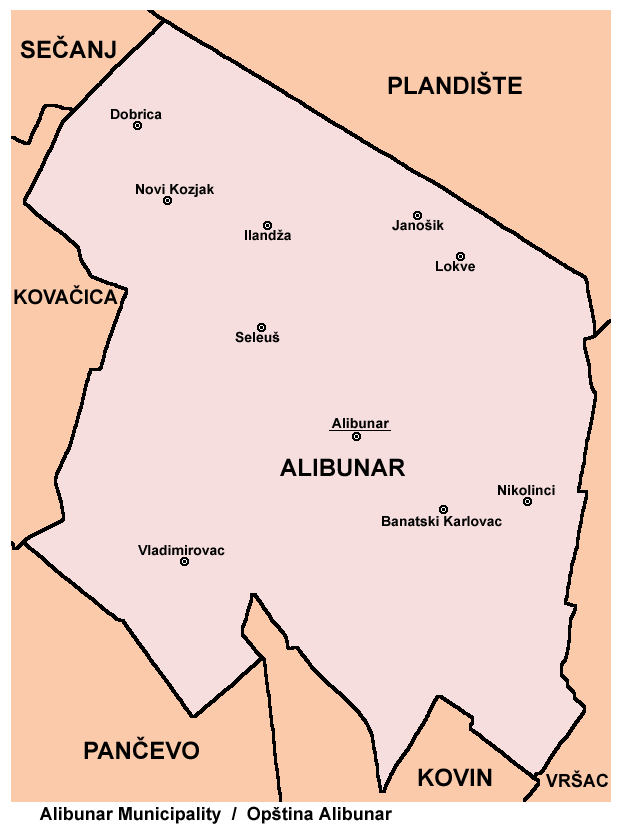
Map of Alibunar municipality

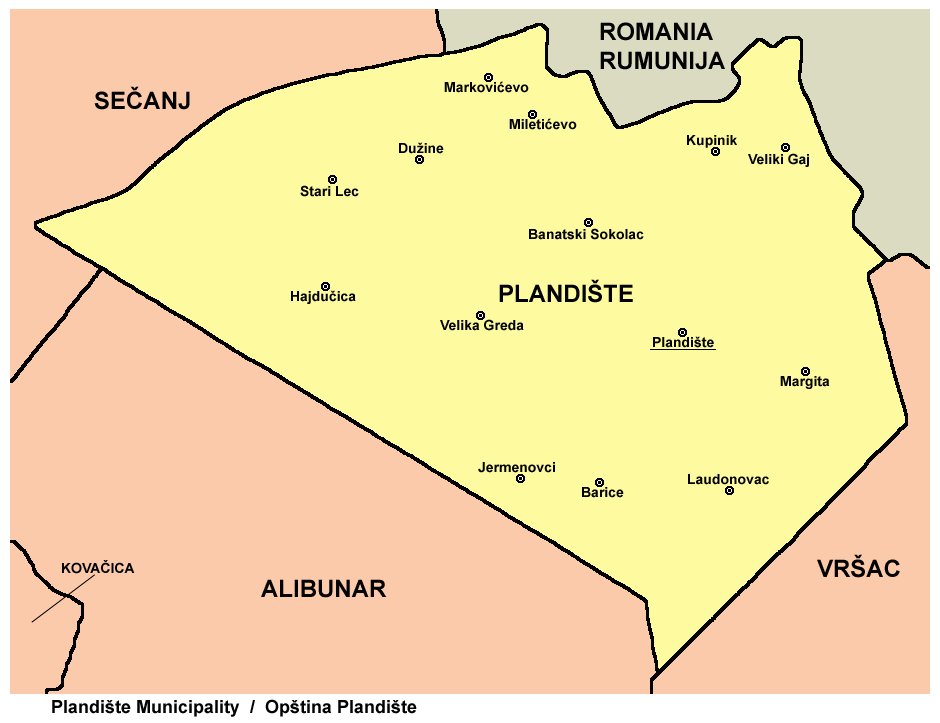
Map of Plandište municipality

== The inhabited places of Srem District ==
=== City of Sremska Mitrovica ===
Settlement	Cyrillic Name	Type	Population (2011)	Largest ethnic group (2002)	Dominant religion (2002)
Sremska Mitrovica	Сремска Митровица	city	37,751	Serbs	Orthodox Christianity
Mačvanska Mitrovica	Мачванска Митровица	town	3,873	Serbs	Orthodox Christianity
Bešenovački Prnjavor	Бешеновачки Прњавор	village	83	Serbs	Orthodox Christianity
Bešenovo	Бешеново	village	841	Serbs	Orthodox Christianity
Bosut	Босут	village	971	Serbs	Orthodox Christianity
Čalma	Чалма	village	1,431	Serbs	Orthodox Christianity
Divoš	Дивош	village	1,361	Serbs	Orthodox Christianity
Grgurevci	Гргуревци	village	1,129	Serbs	Orthodox Christianity
Jarak	Јарак	village	2,039	Serbs	Orthodox Christianity
Kuzmin	Кузмин	village	2,982	Serbs	Orthodox Christianity
Laćarak	Лаћарак	village	10,638	Serbs	Orthodox Christianity
Ležimir	Лежимир	village	699	Serbs	Orthodox Christianity
Manđelos	Манђелос	village	1,319	Serbs	Orthodox Christianity
Martinci	Мартинци	village	3,070	Serbs	Orthodox Christianity
Noćaj	Ноћај	village	1,866	Serbs	Orthodox Christianity
Radenković	Раденковић	village	946	Serbs	Orthodox Christianity
Ravnje	Равње	village	1,184	Serbs	Orthodox Christianity
Salaš Noćajski	Салаш Ноћајски	village	1,751	Serbs	Orthodox Christianity
Sremska Rača	Сремска Рача	village	624	Serbs	Orthodox Christianity
Stara Bingula	Стара Бингула	village	162	Serbs	Catholic Christianity
Šašinci	Шашинци	village	1,623	Serbs	Orthodox Christianity
Šišatovac	Шишатовац	village	211	Serbs	Orthodox Christianity
Šuljam	Шуљам	village	630	Serbs	Orthodox Christianity
Veliki Radinci	Велики Радинци	village	1,426	Serbs	Orthodox Christianity
Zasavica I	Засавица I	village	722	Serbs	Orthodox Christianity
Zasavica II	Засавица II	village	608	Serbs	Orthodox Christianity

Hamlets:

- Vranjaš
- Venac

=== Šid Municipality ===
Settlement	Cyrillic Name Other Names	Type	Population (2011)	Largest ethnic group (2002)	Dominant religion (2002)
Šid	Шид	town	14,893	Serbs	Orthodox Christianity
Adaševci	Адашевци	village	1,919	Serbs	Orthodox Christianity
Bačinci	Бачинци	village	1,180	Serbs	Orthodox Christianity
Batrovci	Батровци	village	259	Serbs	Orthodox Christianity
Berkasovo	Беркасово	village	1,115	Serbs	Orthodox Christianity
Bikić Do	Бикић До (Rusyn: Бикич Дол)	village	269	Rusyns	Greek Catholic Christianity
Bingula	Бингула	village	732	Serbs	Orthodox Christianity
Erdevik	Ердевик	village	2,736	Serbs	Orthodox Christianity
Gibarac	Гибарац	village	989	Serbs	Orthodox Christianity
Ilinci	Илинци	village	804	Serbs	Orthodox Christianity
Jamena	Јамена	village	950	Serbs	Orthodox Christianity
Kukujevci	Кукујевци	village	1,955	Serbs	Orthodox Christianity
Ljuba	Љуба (Slovak: Ľuba)	village	446	Slovaks	Protestantism
Molovin	Моловин	village	195	Serbs	Orthodox Christianity
Morović	Моровић	village	1,774	Serbs	Orthodox Christianity
Privina Glava	Привина Глава	village	186	Serbs	Orthodox Christianity
Sot	Сот	village	679	Serbs	Catholic Christianity
Vašica	Вашица	village	1,424	Serbs	Orthodox Christianity
Višnjićevo	Вишњићево	village	1,683	Serbs	Orthodox Christianity
Note: For the inhabited places with Slovak or Rusyn majority or plurality, the names are also given in these languages.

=== Irig Municipality ===
Settlement	Cyrillic Name Other Names	Type	Population (2011)	Largest ethnic group (2002)	Dominant religion (2002)
Irig	Ириг	town	4,415	Serbs	Orthodox Christianity
Dobrodol	Добродол (Hungarian: Dobradópuszta)	village	107	Hungarians	Catholic Christianity
Grgetek	Гргетек	village	76	Serbs	Orthodox Christianity
Jazak	Јазак	village	960	Serbs	Orthodox Christianity
Krušedol Prnjavor	Крушедол Прњавор	village	234	Serbs	Orthodox Christianity
Krušedol Selo	Крушедол Село	village	340	Serbs	Orthodox Christianity
Mala Remeta	Мала Ремета	village	130	Serbs	Orthodox Christianity
Neradin	Нерадин	village	475	Serbs	Orthodox Christianity
Rivica	Ривица	village	620	Serbs	Orthodox Christianity
Šatrinci	Шатринци (Hungarian: Satrinca)	village	373	Hungarians	Catholic Christianity
Velika Remeta	Велика Ремета	village	44	Serbs	Orthodox Christianity
Vrdnik	Врдник	village	3,092	Serbs	Orthodox Christianity
Note: For the inhabited places with Hungarian ethnic majority, the names are also given in Hungarian.

=== Ruma Municipality ===
Settlement	Cyrillic Name	Type	Population (2011)	Largest ethnic group (2002)	Dominant religion (2002)
Ruma	Рума	town	30,076	Serbs	Orthodox Christianity
Buđanovci	Буђановци	village	1,497	Serbs	Orthodox Christianity
Dobrinci	Добринци	village	1,549	Serbs	Orthodox Christianity
Donji Petrovci	Доњи Петровци	village	924	Serbs	Orthodox Christianity
Grabovci	Грабовци	village	1,189	Serbs	Orthodox Christianity
Hrtkovci	Хртковци	village	3,036	Serbs	Orthodox Christianity
Klenak	Кленак	village	2,946	Serbs	Orthodox Christianity
Kraljevci	Краљевци	village	1056	Serbs	Orthodox Christianity
Mali Radinci	Мали Радинци	village	532	Serbs	Orthodox Christianity
Nikinci	Никинци	village	1,808	Serbs	Orthodox Christianity
Pavlovci	Павловци	village	393	Serbs	Orthodox Christianity
Platičevo	Платичево	village	2,444	Serbs	Orthodox Christianity
Putinci	Путинци	village	2,745	Serbs	Orthodox Christianity
Stejanovci	Стејановци	village	918	Serbs	Orthodox Christianity
Vitojevci	Витојевци	village	808	Serbs	Orthodox Christianity
Voganj	Вогањ	village	1,506	Serbs	Orthodox Christianity
Žarkovac	Жарковац	village	904	Serbs	Orthodox Christianity

=== Pećinci Municipality ===
Settlement	Cyrillic Name	Type	Population (2011)	Largest ethnic group (2002)	Dominant religion (2002)
Pećinci	Пећинци	village	2,581	Serbs	Orthodox Christianity
Ašanja	Ашања	village	1,365	Serbs	Orthodox Christianity
Brestač	Брестач	village	934	Serbs	Orthodox Christianity
Deč	Деч	village	1,491	Serbs	Orthodox Christianity
Donji Tovarnik	Доњи Товарник	village	973	Serbs	Orthodox Christianity
Karlovčić	Карловчић	village	1,078	Serbs	Orthodox Christianity
Kupinovo	Купиново	village	1,866	Serbs	Orthodox Christianity
Obrež	Обреж	village	1,308	Serbs	Orthodox Christianity
Ogar	Огар	village	1,040	Serbs	Orthodox Christianity
Popinci	Попинци	village	1,166	Serbs	Orthodox Christianity
Prhovo	Прхово	village	784	Serbs	Orthodox Christianity
Sibač	Сибач	village	468	Serbs	Orthodox Christianity
Sremski Mihaljevci	Сремски Михаљевци	village	769	Serbs	Orthodox Christianity
Subotište	Суботиште	village	844	Serbs	Orthodox Christianity
Šimanovci	Шимановци	village	3,053	Serbs	Orthodox Christianity

=== Stara Pazova Municipality ===
Settlement	Cyrillic Name	Type	Population (2011)	Largest ethnic group (2002)	Dominant religion (2002)
Stara Pazova	Стара Пазова	town	18,602	Serbs	Orthodox Christianity
Belegiš	Белегиш	village	2,973	Serbs	Orthodox Christianity
Golubinci	Голубинци	village	4,721	Serbs	Orthodox Christianity
Krnješevci	Крњешевци	village	845	Serbs	Orthodox Christianity
Nova Pazova	Нова Пазова	village	17,105	Serbs	Orthodox Christianity
Novi Banovci	Нови Бановци	village	9,443	Serbs	Orthodox Christianity
Stari Banovci	Стари Бановци	village	5,954	Serbs	Orthodox Christianity
Surduk	Сурдук	village	1,397	Serbs	Orthodox Christianity
Vojka	Војка	village	4,752	Serbs	Orthodox Christianity

=== Inđija Municipality ===
Settlement	Cyrillic Name Other Names	Type	Population (2011)	Largest ethnic group (2002)	Dominant religion (2002)
Inđija	Инђија	town	26,025	Serbs	Orthodox Christianity
Beška	Бешка	village	5,783	Serbs	Orthodox Christianity
Čortanovci	Чортановци	village	2,337	Serbs	Orthodox Christianity
Jarkovci	Јарковци	village	593	Serbs	Orthodox Christianity
Krčedin	Крчедин	village	2,429	Serbs	Orthodox Christianity
Ljukovo	Љуково	village	1,525	Serbs	Orthodox Christianity
Maradik	Марадик	village	2,095	Serbs	Orthodox Christianity
Novi Karlovci	Нови Карловци	village	2,856	Serbs	Orthodox Christianity
Novi Slankamen	Нови Сланкамен	village	2,994	Serbs	Orthodox Christianity
Slankamenački Vinogradi	Сланкаменачки Виногради (Slovak: Slankamenské Vinohrady)	village	253	Slovaks	Protestantism
Stari Slankamen	Стари Сланкамен	village	543	Serbs	Orthodox Christianity
Note: For the inhabited place with Slovak majority, the name is also given in Slovak.

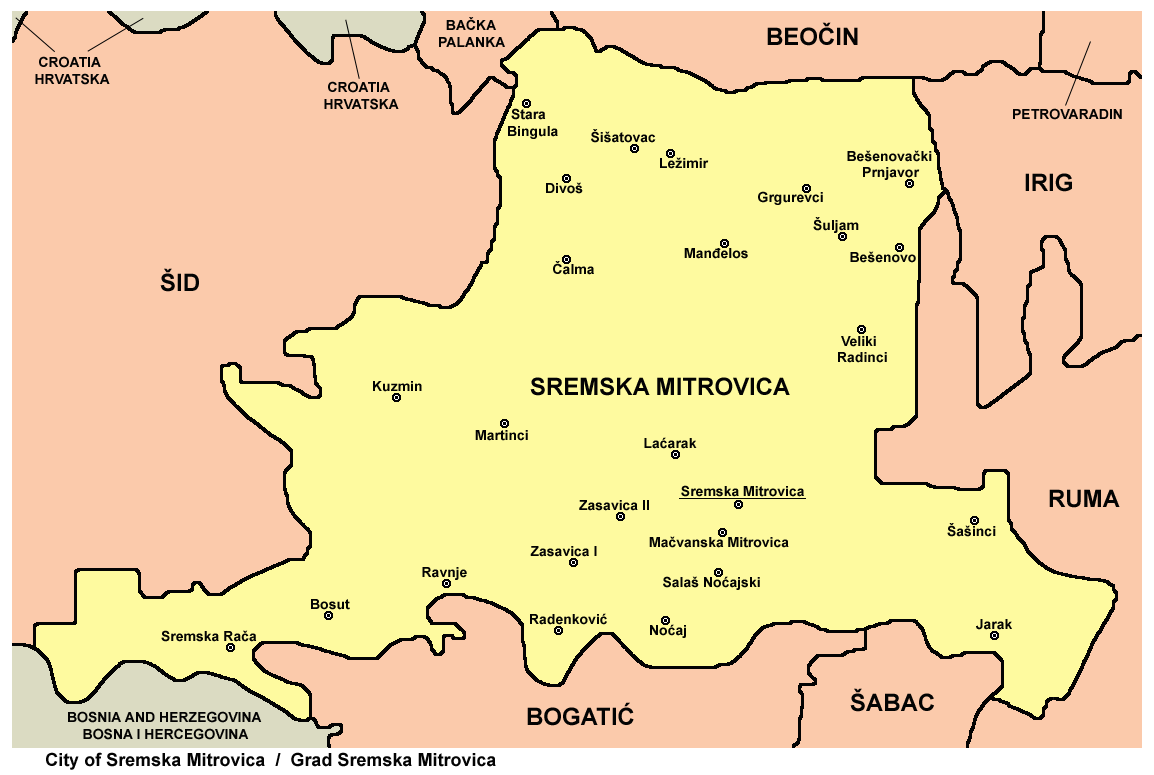
Map of Sremska Mitrovica municipality

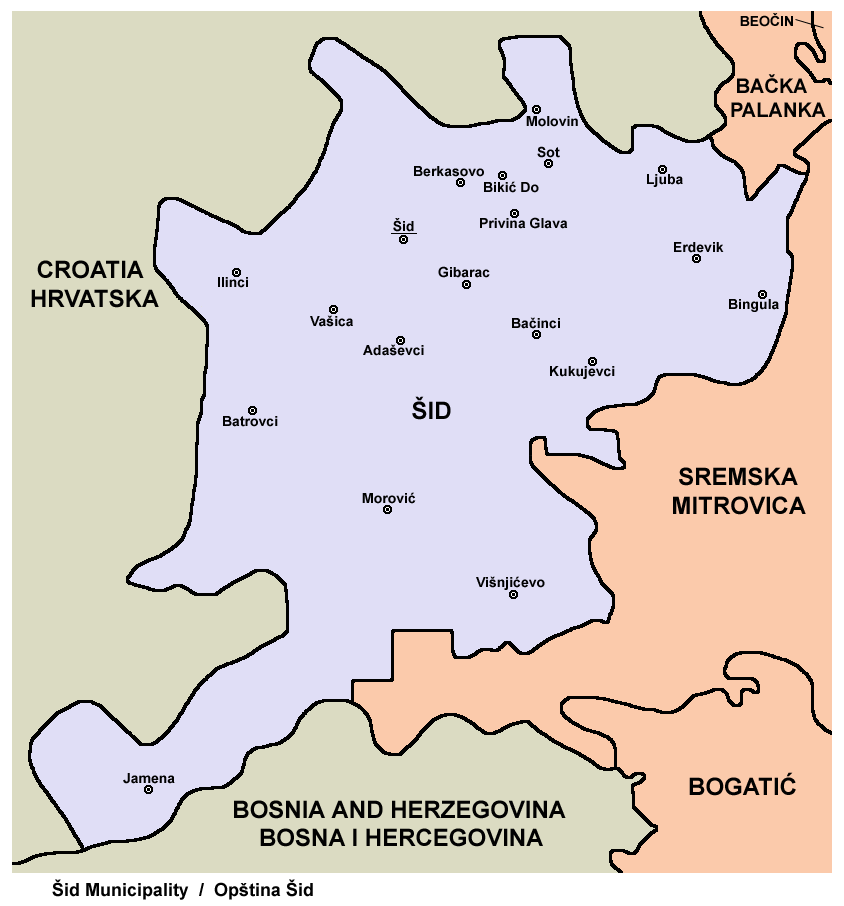
Map of Šid municipality

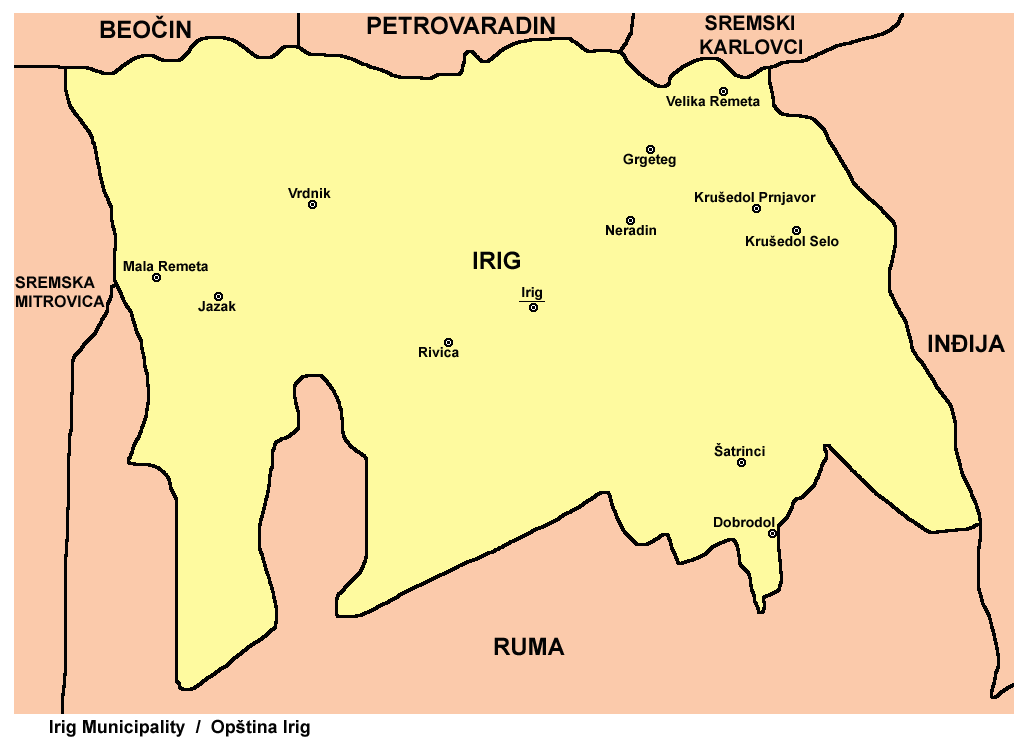
Map of Irig municipality

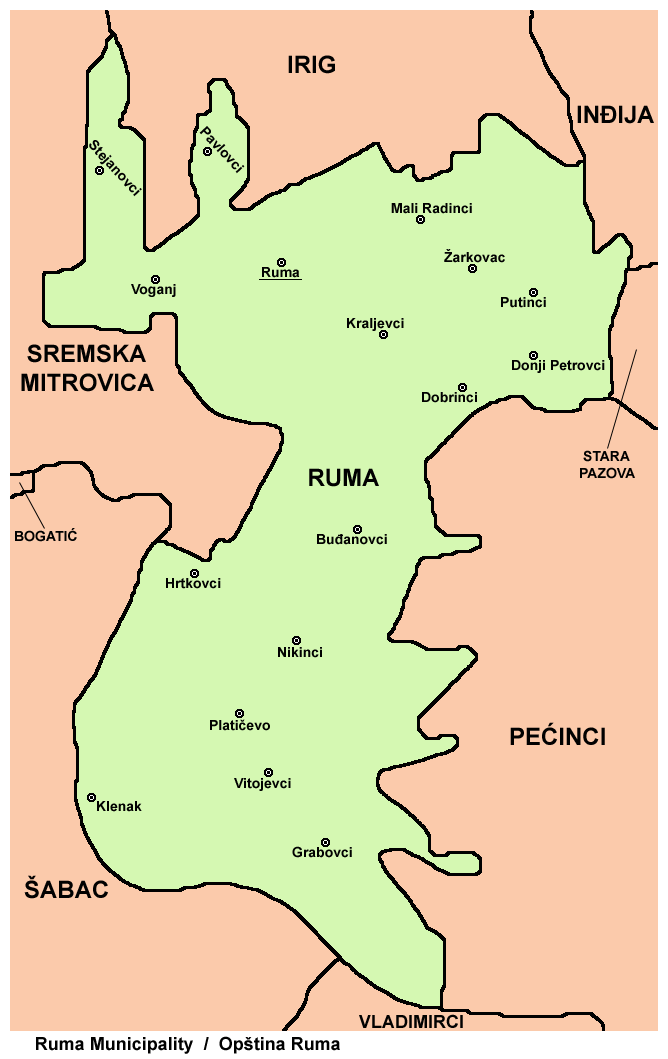
Map of Ruma municipality

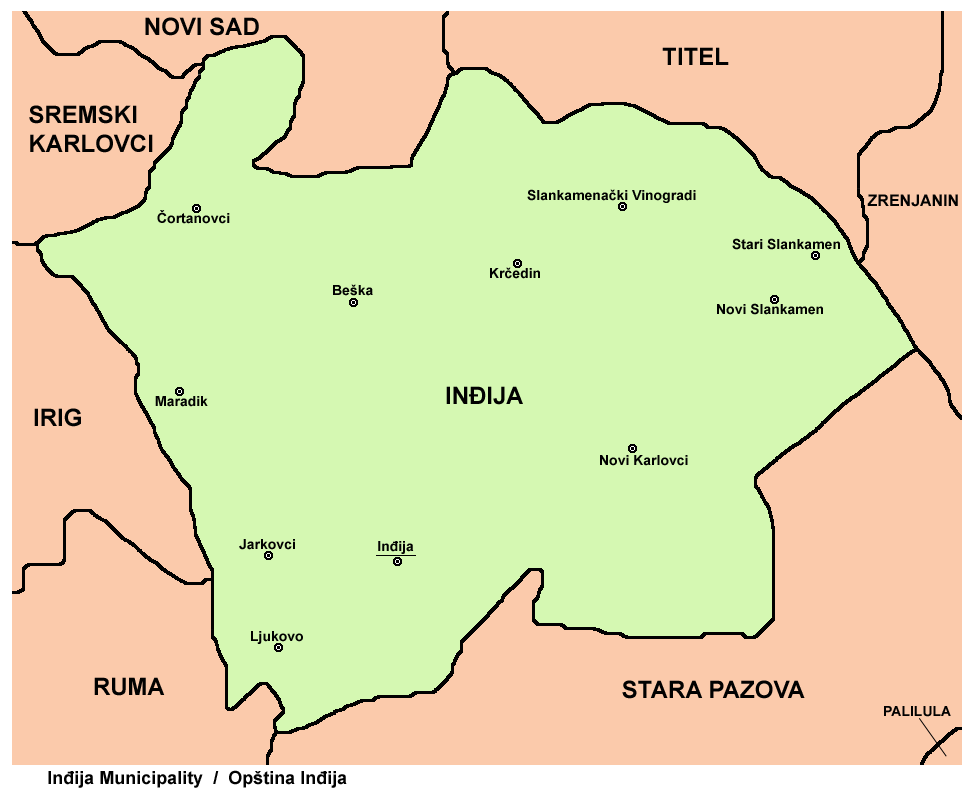
Map of Inđija municipality

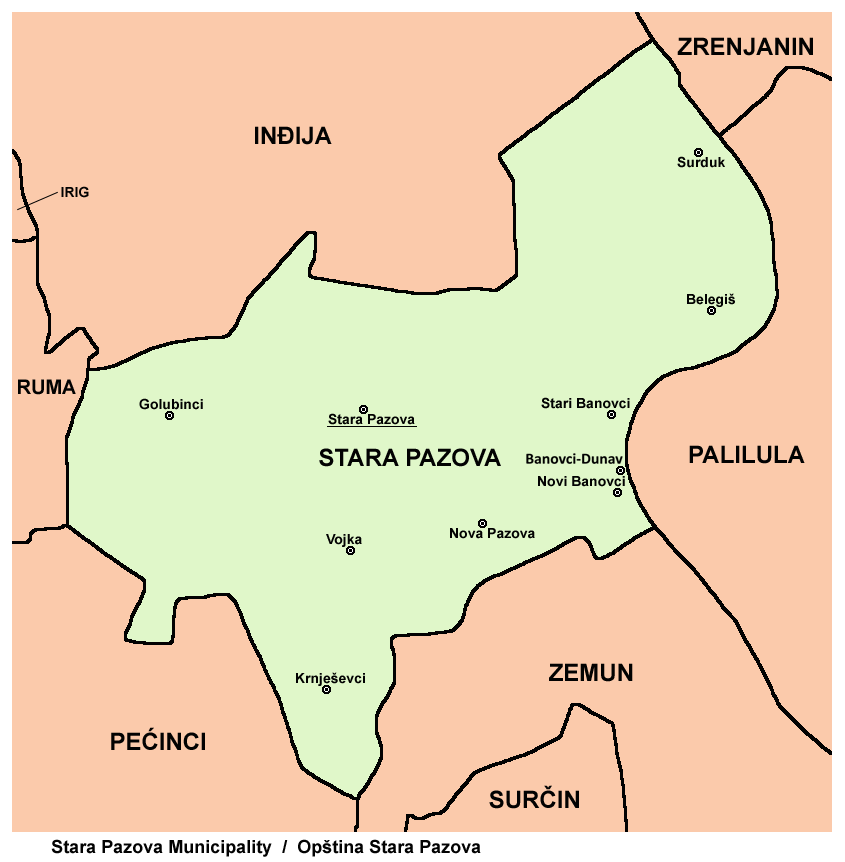
Map of Stara Pazova municipality

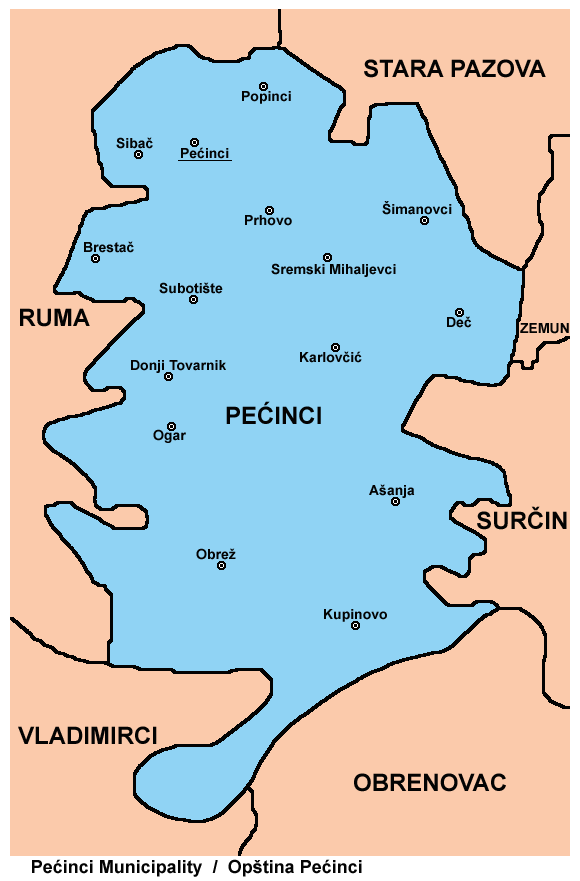
Map of Pećinci municipality

== Former settlements ==
Former settlements in Vojvodina that were abandoned or resettled:

Settlement	Cyrillic Name Other Names	Type / Location	Settlement destiny	Largest ethnic group (year)
Almaš	Алмаш	Former village in Bačka (located between Temerin, Nadalj and Gospođinci)	It was resettled in 1718	Serbs (1715)
Kočićevo	Кочићево	Former village in Bačka (located in Bačka Topola municipality)	It was abandoned in the second half of the 20th century	Serbs (1971)
Molin	Молин	Former village in Banat (located in Nova Crnja municipality)	It was abandoned in 1961	Serbs (1953)
Selište	Селиште (Hungarian: Újfalu)	Former village in Bačka (located in Mali Iđoš municipality)	It was abandoned in the second half of the 20th century	Hungarians (1971)
Note: For the former settlement with Hungarian ethnic majority, the name is also given in Hungarian.

Former settlements in Vojvodina that were merged with other places:

Settlement	Cyrillic Name Other Names	Type / Location	Settlement destiny	Largest ethnic group (year)
Aleksandrovo	Александрово	Former village in Bačka	Today neighborhood of Subotica	Serbs (1910)
Bikač	Бикач	Former village in Banat	Today part of Bašaid	Serbs (1971)
Kruševlje	Крушевље	Former village in Bačka	Degraded to formal settlement status, today part of Gakovo	Serbs (1971)
Mužlja	Мужља (Hungarian: Muzslya)	Former village in Banat	Today neighborhood of Zrenjanin	Hungarians (1971)
Novi Vladimirovac	Нови Владимировац	Former village in Banat	Today part of Vladimirovac	Serbs (1971)
Tankosićevo	Танкосићево (Slovak: Tankosiťevo)	Former village in Bačka	Today part of Kisač	Slovaks (1971)
Veliki Salaš	Велики Салаш (Croatian: Veliki Salaš)	Former village in Bačka	Degraded to formal settlement status, today part of Sonta	Croats (1971)
Vojlovica	Војловица (Hungarian: Hertelendyfalva)	Former village in Banat	Today neighborhood of Pančevo	Hungarians (1971)
Note: For the former settlements with Hungarian, Slovak or Croat majority or plurality, the names are also given in these languages.

== See also ==
- Cities and towns of Serbia
- Populated places of Serbia
- Municipalities and cities of Serbia
- Districts of Serbia
- Statistical regions of Serbia
- Administrative divisions of Serbia
- German exonyms in Vojvodina
- Hungarian exonyms in Vojvodina
- Rusyn exonyms in Vojvodina
