= Topovske Šupe concentration camp =

Topovske Šupe
- Concentration camp
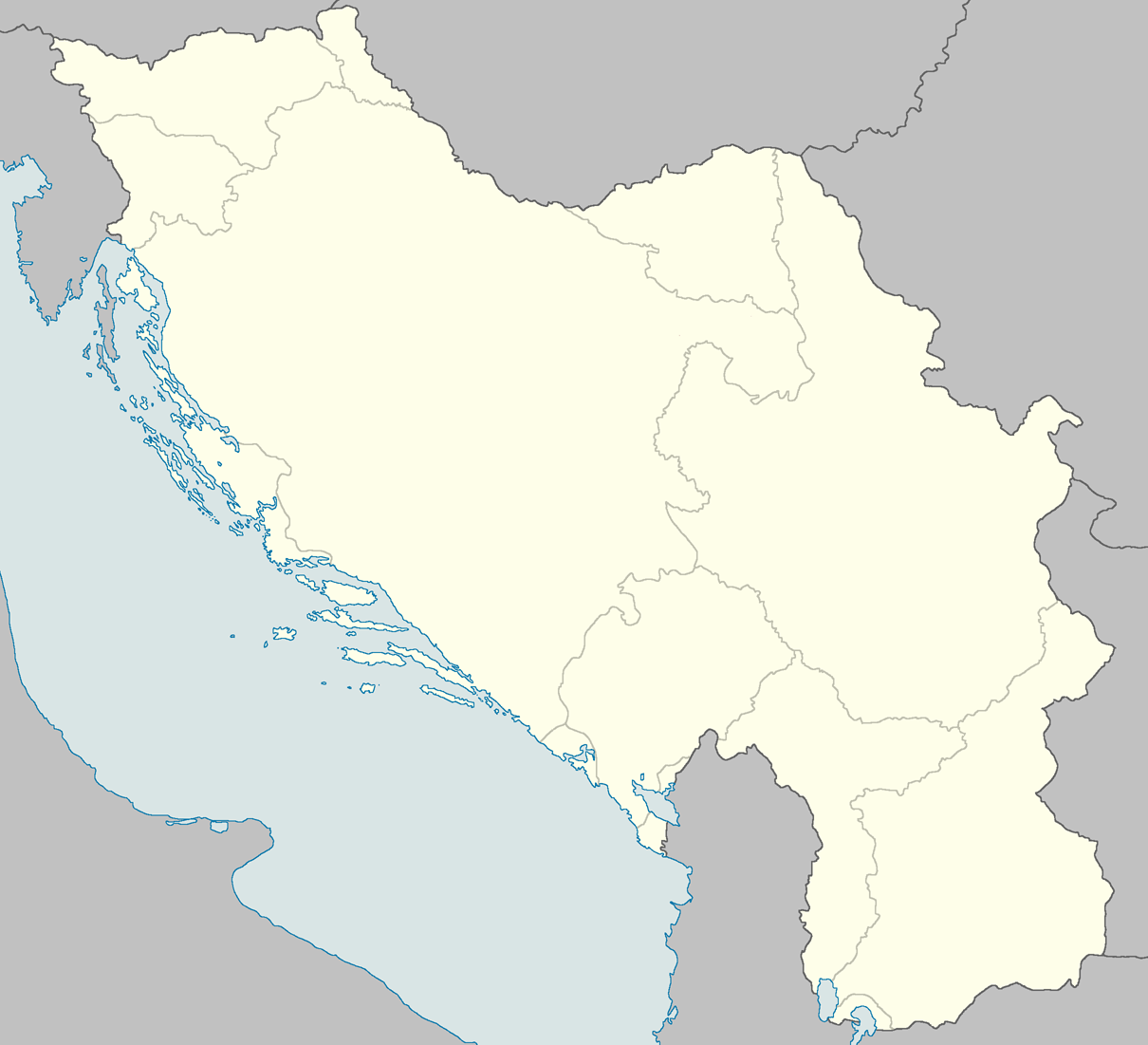
- Location of Topovske Šupe within occupied Yugoslavia
- Coordinates: 44°47′25″N 20°28′05″E
- Location: Belgrade, Territory of the Military Commander in Serbia
- Operated by: German Gestapo; Gendermarie of the Government of National Salvation
- Original use: Royal Yugoslav Army military base
- Operational: August–December 1941
- Inmates: primarily Jews and Romanis
- Number of inmates: 5,000–6,500
- Killed: 4,300

The Topovske Šupe concentration camp (German: Konzentrationslager Kanonen-Schuppen; Serbian: Logor Topovske Šupe, Serbian Cyrillic: Логор Топовске Шупе) was a concentration camp located on the outskirts of Belgrade which was operated by Nazi Germany with the help of Milan Nedić's quisling government during World War II. Located in the neighborhood of Autokomanda, on the site of an old military base, the camp held between 5,000 and 6,500 inmates from its establishment in August 1941 until its closure that December. About 4,300 inmates were killed during its operation, of whom 3,000 were killed as hostages and 1,300 as suspected anti-fascists.

== Background ==
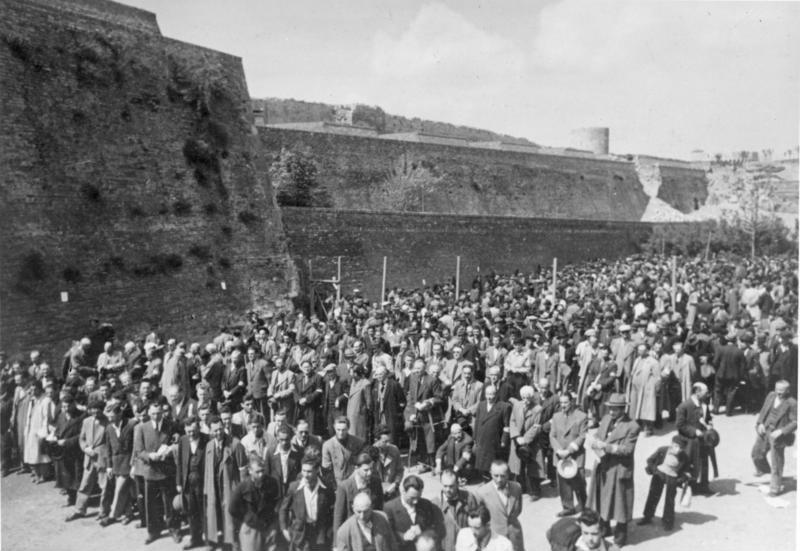
Jews were rounded up by the Germans after the Axis invasion of Yugoslavia.

On 6 April 1941, Axis forces invaded the Kingdom of Yugoslavia. Poorly equipped and poorly trained, the Royal Yugoslav Army was quickly defeated. The country was then occupied and dismembered, with the Wehrmacht establishing the Territory of the Military Commander in Serbia under a government of military occupation. The territory included most of Serbia proper, with the addition of the northern part of Kosovo (centred on Kosovska Mitrovica), and the Banat. It was the only area of partitioned Yugoslavia in which the German occupants established a military government, to exploit the key rail and riverine transport routes that passed through it, and its valuable resources, particularly non-ferrous metals. The Military Commander in Serbia appointed Serbian puppet governments to "carry on administrative chores under German direction and supervision". On 29 August 1941, the Germans appointed the Government of National Salvation under General Milan Nedić, to replace the short-lived Commissioner Administration.

A pre-war politician who was known to have pro-Axis leanings, Nedić was selected because the Germans believed his fierce anti-Communism and military experience could be used to quell an armed uprising in the Serbian region of Šumadija. Unable to bring reinforcements due to the need to send soldiers to the Eastern Front, the Germans responded to the revolt by declaring that one-hundred Serbs would be executed for every German soldier killed and that fifty would be executed for every German soldier wounded. By October 1941, this policy had resulted in the deaths of 25,000 Serbs. The Germans also targeted Jews, who were subjected to forced labour, punitive taxing, and restrictive decrees. Jews were also registered with German authorities and forced to wear identifying armbands while Jewish property was confiscated. They, and to a lesser degree Romani people, were targeted on racial grounds, although most were not killed outright. Following the start of the anti-German uprising, German propaganda began associating Jews with Communism and anti-German ideology. Executions and arrests of Serbian Jews followed.

== Operation ==
The camp at Topovske Šupe (lit. cannon sheds) was established on 20 August 1941 on the site of a former Royal Yugoslav Army military base. The former military base was called Logor kraljevića Andreja, the "Prince Andrej Camp", after Prince Andrew of Yugoslavia, brother of the king. Located on the outskirts of Belgrade, it was the first extermination camp for Jewish men established by German forces in Serbia and was partly run by the Gestapo.

Originally, Jews from the Banat were detained in the camp due to Nazi allegations that Jewish groups were behind the anti-German revolt. They were expelled by the Volksdeutsche from Banat to Belgrade where they originally settled into the Jewish centers, private houses and synagogues. Later, an order was issued that they all should be interned into the Topovske Šupe. At first, the inmates were sent to the forced labor. As the rebellion spread over Serbia in 1941, the Nazis organized penal expeditions and mass internment began, so the camp became a "hostage reservoir". Afterwards, the camp only detained Jewish males of fourteen years and older. Prisoners were held in poor conditions and were guarded by the gendarmes of the Nedić government, whose cruelty towards inmates often exceeded that of the Germans. Prisoners who attempted to escape the camp were publicly hanged by the gendarmes as a warning to other inmates. The camp became a hostage centre from where the Germans could select victims for reprisal shootings. Daily, the Germans shot between 150 and 450 predominantly Jewish inmates. Though officially called "Jewish Transitional Camp", the complex was used for gathering other nationalities, too. The Romany population was mostly brought from the neighborhood of Marinkova Bara to the east, but also from other parts of Belgrade. One part of Topovske Šupe was declared a Refugee Camp where Serbs, refugees from the Independent State of Croatia, were situated.

Executions usually occurred at the Jajinci firing range, in the village of Jabuka or in the Deliblato Sands. They were carried out after inmates were deceived into thinking they were being taken to a camp in Austria where they would experience better treatment and would be fed better food. In the autumn of 1941, trucks transported Jews from Topovske Šupe to the locality Čardak near Deliblato. The prisoners were told they were to participate in some public works, but instead they dug trenches for their own burial. They were lined in three lines, women and children in the first, and men in the next two. The rows were shot one by one, while those in the next row were then burying them. The last row was thrown in the trench by the German soldiers. Further executions were conducted later that day, including Jews from other places. In total, some 500 people were killed and thrown into seven pits. In June 1944, the Sonderkommando unit No. 150 dug out the bodies and burned them in the crematory. A memorial was later erected at the locality. By December 1941, most Serbian Jews over fourteen were detained at Topovske Šupe. That month, the camp was closed. Surviving inmates were used as the forced laborers during the adaptation of the Sajmište into the camp, to which they were transferred later. It took only several months to annihilate the entire male Jewish population of Belgrade, so mostly women and children were interned in Sajmište.

An estimated 5,000–6,000 people were detained at Topovske Šupe throughout its operation, of whom 3,000 were killed as hostages and 1,300 were killed as suspected anti-fascists. Historian Milan Koljanin has estimated that the camp held 6,000–6,500 inmates (5,000 Jews and 1,000–1,500 Romanis). Milovan Pisarri, from the Center for Research and Education about Holocaust, writes that there is no evidence that executions were conducted in the camp, but mentions the case of two Jews who were publicly hanged between the barracks after an unsuccessful escape attempt.

== Aftermath ==
After the war, the site of the camp was neglected by Belgrade authorities. Pisarri believes that the reason for neglect, despite very meticulous official politics in former Yugoslavia regarding the memory of victims, is that victims in this camp were neither Communist fighters nor anti-fascists, while later the focus shifted to the Serbian victims. Koljanin says that, as a society, "we didn't appear in a good light" when it comes to the Sajmište camp either, and that Topovske Šupe should be part of a memorial web, centered in the future commemorative complex in Sajmište.

The remains of the objects are desolate and within the complex near the Tabanovačka Street, only one wall and two one-floor barracks survive today. The memorial plaque, which commemorates the events in Topovske Šupe was dedicated only in 2005, when Miroslav Mišković, a tycoon and one of the richest Serbs and owner of Delta Holding, purchased the lot and announced plans to build a massive Delta Planet Shopping Center and two 40-floor business towers. The plaque was stolen in the summer of 2017, then recovered by the police and handed over to the Jewish Municipality of Belgrade, but as of November 2017 it was still not returned to the location. Only the small central part is arranged, in the form of a rose garden, while the complex extends into an informal settlement. The memorial plaque was dedicated again on 2 May 2019, as part of the Yom HaShoah. The plaque in Serbia, Hebrew and English was unveiled by Estera Bajer Albahari, who was born in the Sajmište concentration camp in 1942.

The announcement by Delta Holding was met by opposition from Jewish groups who argued that it was not "[morally] right to build a shopping centre on a site from where people have been taken to death." One of the main contractors behind the project is an architectural group from Israel. As of 2017, Delta Holding still didn't began any works on the mega project, but claim that they will build the planned 200,000 m^{2} (2,200,000 sq ft) shopping mall but also that they will keep the memory of the camp. The company also stated that for 10 years they contemplate what to do and how to adapt the ruins into the proper memorial, in collaboration with the architect of the project, Ami Mur from Israel. Before any works done on the complex, the investors would have to obtain permits from the Institute for the culture monuments protection as Topovske Šupe are placed under the "preliminary protection". Serbian Ministry of Labour, Employment, Veteran and Social Policy stated that the investor has to preserve the complex and that nothing can be built in the zone of 5 m (16 ft) around the present ruins.

The 2018 internal strife in Jewish organizations in Serbia, including both on the local and on the state level, caused the exclusion from the European Jewish Congress, but also affected the future of the Topovske Šupe complex. Two groups accused each other, annulling each other's decisions. One group claimed that the others wanted to completely demolish the complex, leaving only one part of the wall within the new shopping mall, and that better solution is relocation of the objects. The other group denied this, claiming that the first group actually wants to demolish everything. Proposed solutions, from 2016 to 2019, included: partial demolition of the complex; relocation and formation of the memorial center on some other location, 500 m (1,600 ft) away from the old one; partial demolition with revitalization of the remaining part; construction of the new memorial in the form of the wall with a fountain parallel to the shopping mall; incorporation of this wall into the shopping mall (proposed by Mur, but rejected by the Jewish organizations). Delta Holding said it will accept any solution accepted by the Jewish organizations, while similar was said by the Institute for the protection of monuments, which in May 2018 extended the preliminary protection of the complex for another 3 years, asking for the full legal protection of the complex as the cultural monument. One of two remaining buildings, however, is on the lot purchased by the Delta (the other one is on the lot owned by the city) and, technically, could be demolished by the investor after August 2019. Romany organizations, whose consent is also needed, gave consent for the demolition of both buildings.

On 24 February 2020, Serbian assembly adopted the Law on Memorial Center Staro Sajmište as an institute for keeping the memory of the victims of Nazi concentration camps Sajmište and Topovske Šupe. For the first time, one law in Serbia recognized the genocide in the Independent State of Croatia, the Holocaust and the Samudaripen, as World War II genocides of the Serbs, Jews and Romani people, respectively. The law will become effective on 1 January 2021. In March 2021, city and Delta Holding announced that the concept for the former camp and the surrounding area was changed. The remaining objects will be fully renovated and the memorial complex will be formed. Instead of mega shopping mall next to it, Delta Holding will build an urban business district, with commercial, business and residential sections with lots of green areas.
