= Deliblatska Peščara =

Geographical subregion of Banat, Serbia

Deliblato Sands
- Делиблатска пешчара Deliblatska peščara
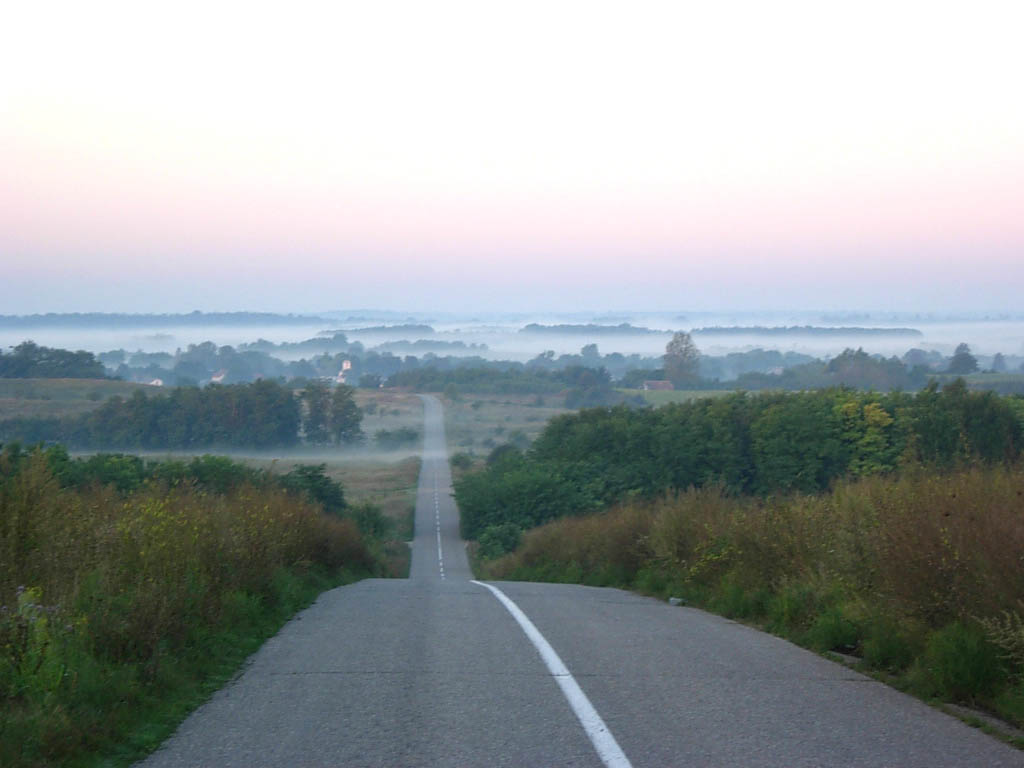
- Deliblato Sands

- Location within Serbia Location within Balkans Location within Europe
- Floor elevation: 250 m (820 ft)
- Area: 300 km^{2} (120 sq mi)

Geography
- Location: Banat, Serbia
- Coordinates: 44°53′01″N 21°05′33″E
- Interactive map of Deliblato Sands

Deliblato Sands (Serbian: Делиблатска пешчара / Deliblatska peščara, Hungarian: Delibláti-homokpuszta) is a large sand area covering around 300 km^{2} (120 sq mi) of ground in the South Banat District of Serbia. It is located between the river Danube and the southwestern slopes of the Carpathian Mountains. The sands are named after the village of Deliblato in the municipality of Kovin. The landscape is dominated by elliptical hills with steppe grassland plains and steppe forests.

The Deliblato Sands are one of the largest sandy terrains in Europe, once part of a vast prehistoric desert that originated from the withdrawal of the Pannonian Sea. They are home to many endemic species of plants and animals which are rare or endangered in Europe and globally. Due to its forest and surroundings, it was declared a special nature reserve. On a national level, it represents a natural asset of special importance falling under protection category I.

== Geography ==
The Deliblato Sands are an expanse shaped by Aeolian processes with significant dune-like relief made of powerful sandy deposits, covering around 300 km^{2} (120 sq mi) of land. It is a unique feature in this part of the world as the largest exemplar of the true sandy relief. Dunes are 70 to 200 m (230 to 660 ft) tall. Southeast of the sands is the Kraljevac lake, one of the reservoirs formed around the edges of the region, in an effort to stop the movement of the sand. There are floating peat islands on the lake's surface, where numerous waterfowl nest.

The southern section of the sands, which reaches the Danube, is known as Labudovo Okno. It was declared a Ramsar wetland in 2006. This section covers an area of 37.33 km^{2} (14.41 sq mi) and includes marshes, ponds, meanders, river islands of Žilovo, Čibuklija and Zavojska Ada, meanders of the Karaš river and the submerged mouth of the Nera into the Danube. It is one of the most important migratory bird habitats in Serbia.

== Wildlife ==
The Deliblato Sands are rich in floral diversity, it is home to 900 different species of plants, many of which are considered by international standards rare or endemic to the Pannonian Basin. Regions of similar terrain across Europe have been cultivated, forested or otherwise altered, while Deliblato Sands has largely remained untouched. Some of the endangered and endemic species of flora include the Banat peony, steppe peony, Pančić wormwood, bulrush, and dwarf Russian almond. Twenty different species of Orchidaceae grow in this area. Tree species used for the immobilisation of the moving sand include black locust, black pine, Scots pine, and various deciduous species.

A total of 200 animal species inhabit the sands. Rare fauna include the desert ant, antlion, mole-rat, steppe polecat, steppe birch mouse, steppe mouse-tailed dormouse, and steppe skunk, which are species for which Deliblato Sands is the only or one of the few remaining habitats in Serbia. Bird species include the sand martin, little egret, and pygmy cormorant. The main source of food for some endangered birds of prey, such as the Banat falcon, saker falcon, eastern imperial eagle, and lesser spotted eagle, is ground squirrels that live in large open grass fields; hence such areas are necessary for their survival. Other noted animals are the wolf, deer, roe deer, and boar.

== History ==
Remains from the Bronze Age were discovered in the locality of Židovar. Other localities (Đurica, Grebenac, Veliki Grad, and Mali Grad) contain remains of the habitation from the 13th century BC to the 1500s and 1600s. Roman period is represented with the trench near Kovin (Rimski šanac).

In 1789, Austrian authorities, which controlled the area at the time, dispatched forest engineer Franz Bachofen from Timișoara to conduct measurements of the sands and compile a report on how to "tame" the sand. At the time, strong winds and storms would carry the sand from Deliblato all the way to Vienna and Pest. According to the popular myth, Austrian empress Maria Theresa ordered the fixing of Deliblato after wind brought some sand into her plate while she was eating soup. After a decade of work, Bachofen reported that the sands cover an area of 406.60 km^{2} (156.99 sq mi), out of which 168 km^{2} (65 sq mi) is covered with loose, free sand. In order to immobilise the sand, Bachofer drafted a forestation plan, which was accepted in 1818. Since then, almost 300 km^{2} (120 sq mi) of the sand was forested, but also 250 km^{2} (97 sq mi) got burned over time in three catastrophic fires caused by human negligence.

The sand was used as a hideout by the Yugoslav Partisans during World War II. They used to build base camps and dugouts where they were hiding after the anti-German actions. Out of numerous temporary hideouts, only one is preserved today. It was an improvised hospital in the locality Čardak. A monument dedicated to the Jews who were transported from Belgrade and executed in the sands by the Germans during the occupation, is also located here.

After the war, numerous Youth work actions were organised in the sands. Until the late 1980s, organised and planned works included the immobilisation of the sand, formation of the firefighting paths and paving the roads, while the "Čardak" settlement for the participants of the actions was constructed. It was envisioned as a touristic and sports complex in the future, but it was neglected in time and since the 1990s became a settlement for the Yugoslav wars refugees. The greenery in the region was almost completely destroyed in the devastating 1996 fire.

"Čardak" was then adapted into the educational-recreational centre. In March 2020, the provincial administration decided to use it as the camp for the Middle Eastern migrants, who at the time numbered 8,500, scattered in 17 camps all over Serbia. Only those from Vojvodina (several hundred) were to be placed here. Hundreds of local denizens protested, joined by the representatives of the local administration. Though claiming the decision was only temporary (2 months at most), the province revoked it a week later, declaring it the COVID-19 quarantine instead.

In total, there are some 800 households, weekend-houses or rooms in excursion complexes in the sands. This includes a weekend settlement with 20 bungalows, built by the former Glass Industry Pančevo, which is today left to the elements. The chronic problem in the sands is the lack of drinking water.

== Characteristics ==
Extensive grapevine cultivation spread while the sands were part of the Banat Military Frontier, until 1873. It was said that "there was no house without a grapevine" at the time. There were also large vineyard plantations, like the Pálfi and Sauerwald at Kajtasovo, Emanuelovac at Dubovac, Wekerle at Vladimirovac, Mramorak Vineyards, and the vineyard at Šušara. The red grape was dominant (varieties of Othello, Trollinger, Sazodoš, and Volovo Oko), but also cultivated were the white grape (White Othello, Kozje Sise) and the rose grape (Dinka). As the cultivation of vines on the sandy soil is arduous work, many quit cultivation in time, leaving vast empty sand areas.

The locality of Devojački Bunar is situated in the northwestern corner of the sands. It is a popular excursion place which also includes the only wooden church in Vojvodina, dedicated to Margaret the Virgin, in Serbian known as the Fiery Maria, and an old dolap. Dolap is a type of old water well, powered by animals, mostly horses or oxen. The well at Devojački Bunar extracted water from a depth of 163 m (535 ft).

An artistic colony "Deliblatska Peščara" is organised annually. In decades, until 2019, 432 artists participated in workshops, producing thousands of works, out of which 1,288 were given to the town of Pančevo. Established in 1969, the colony is centered at Devojački Bunar.

== In popular culture ==
The sands was used as a filming location for numerous international and Serbian films: Genghis Khan (1965), I Even Met Happy Gypsies (1967), It Rains in My Village (1968), Who's Singin' Over There? (1980), The Elusive Summer of '68 (1984), Battle of Kosovo (1989), The White Suit (1999), St. George Shoots the Dragon (2009), and some 10 other films and co-productions.

== Gallery ==
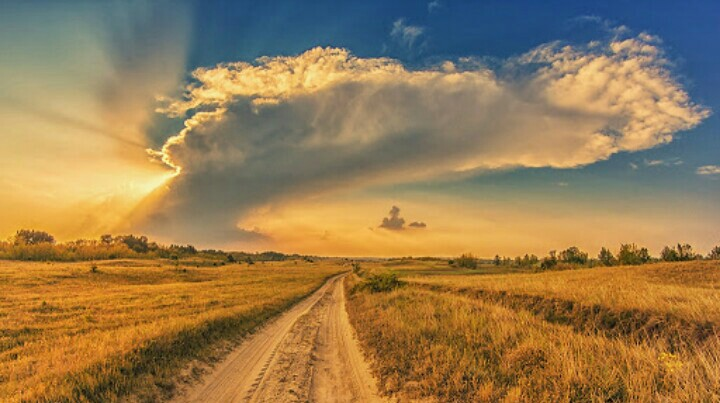

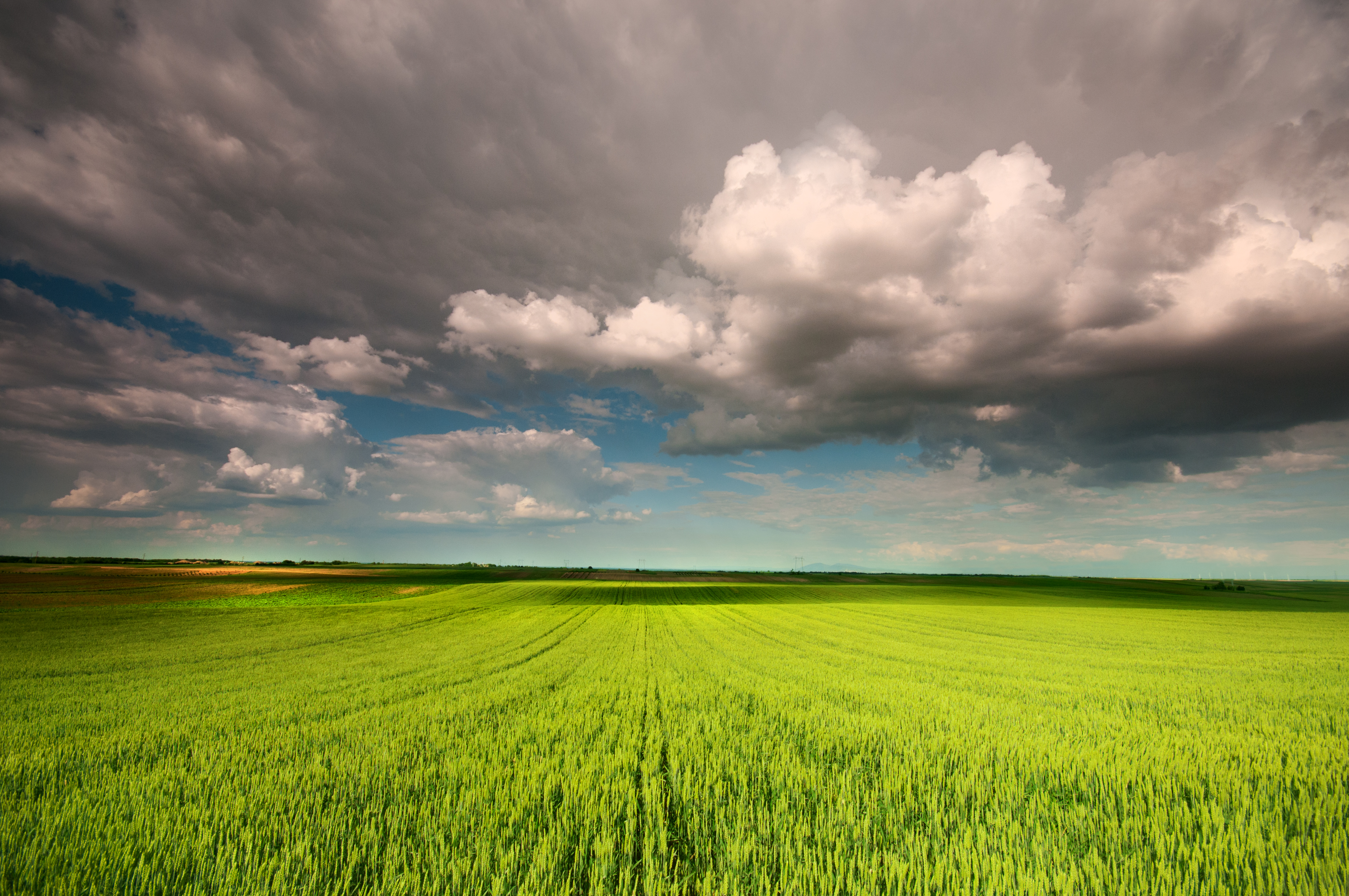

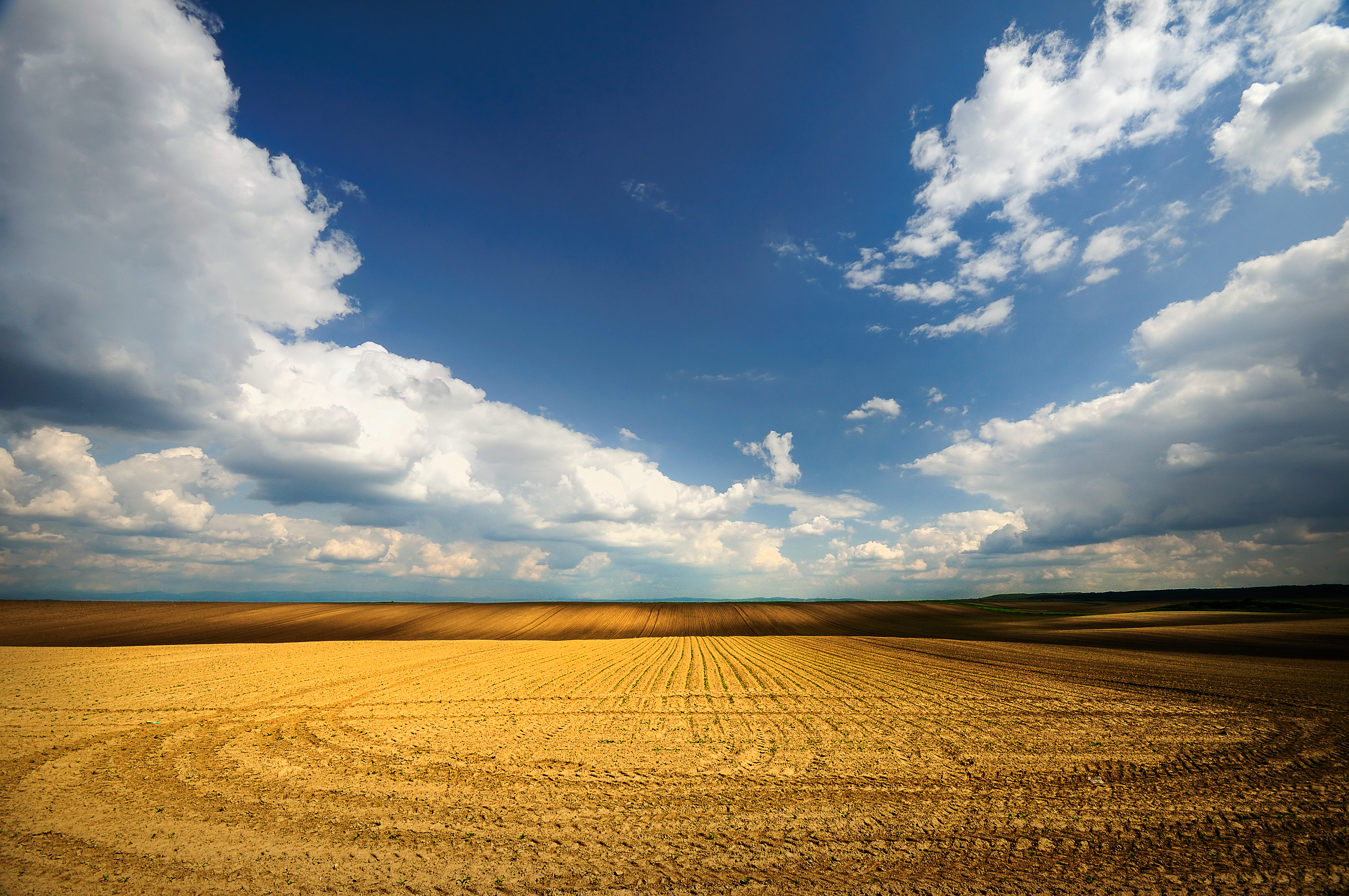

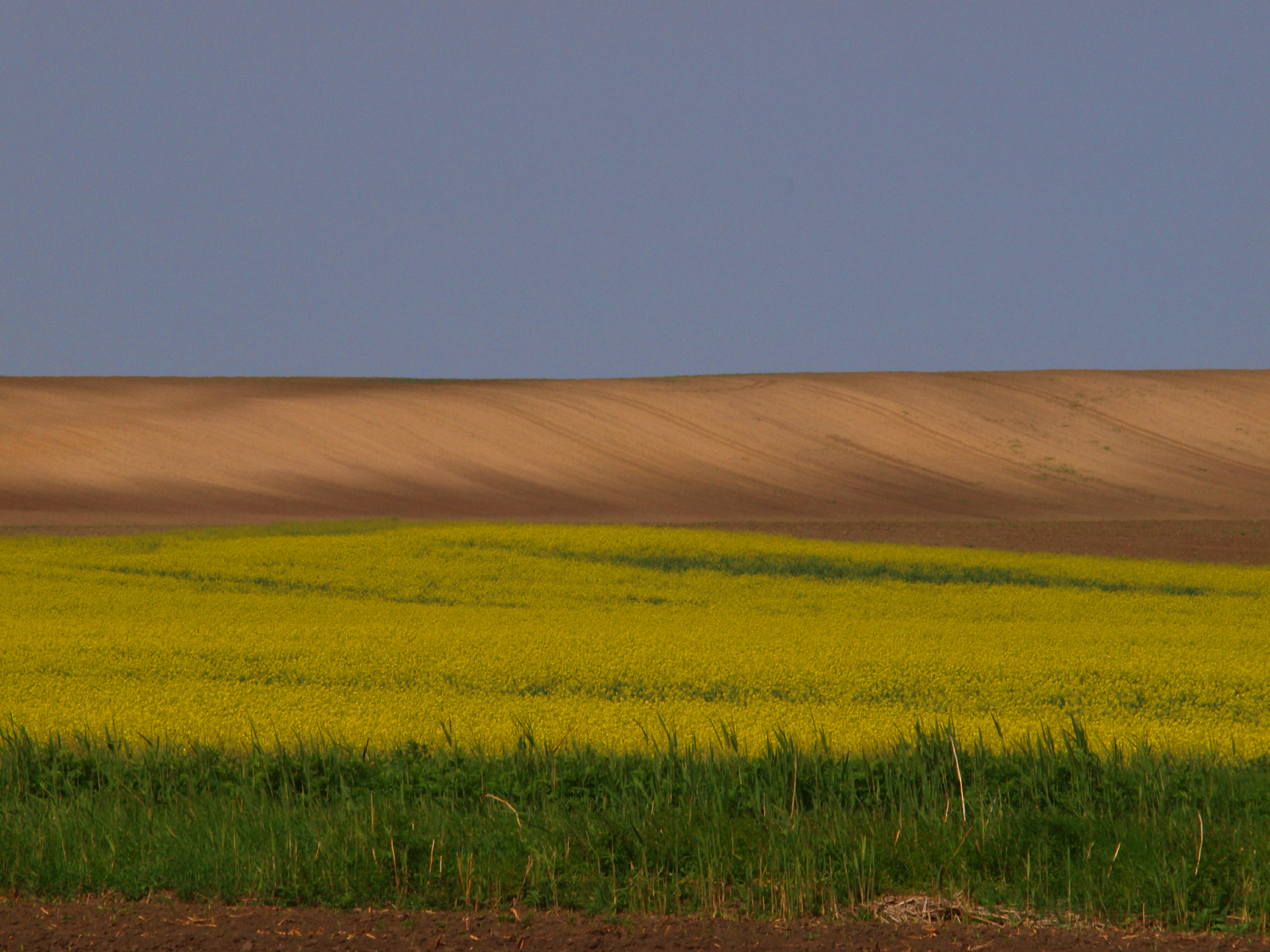

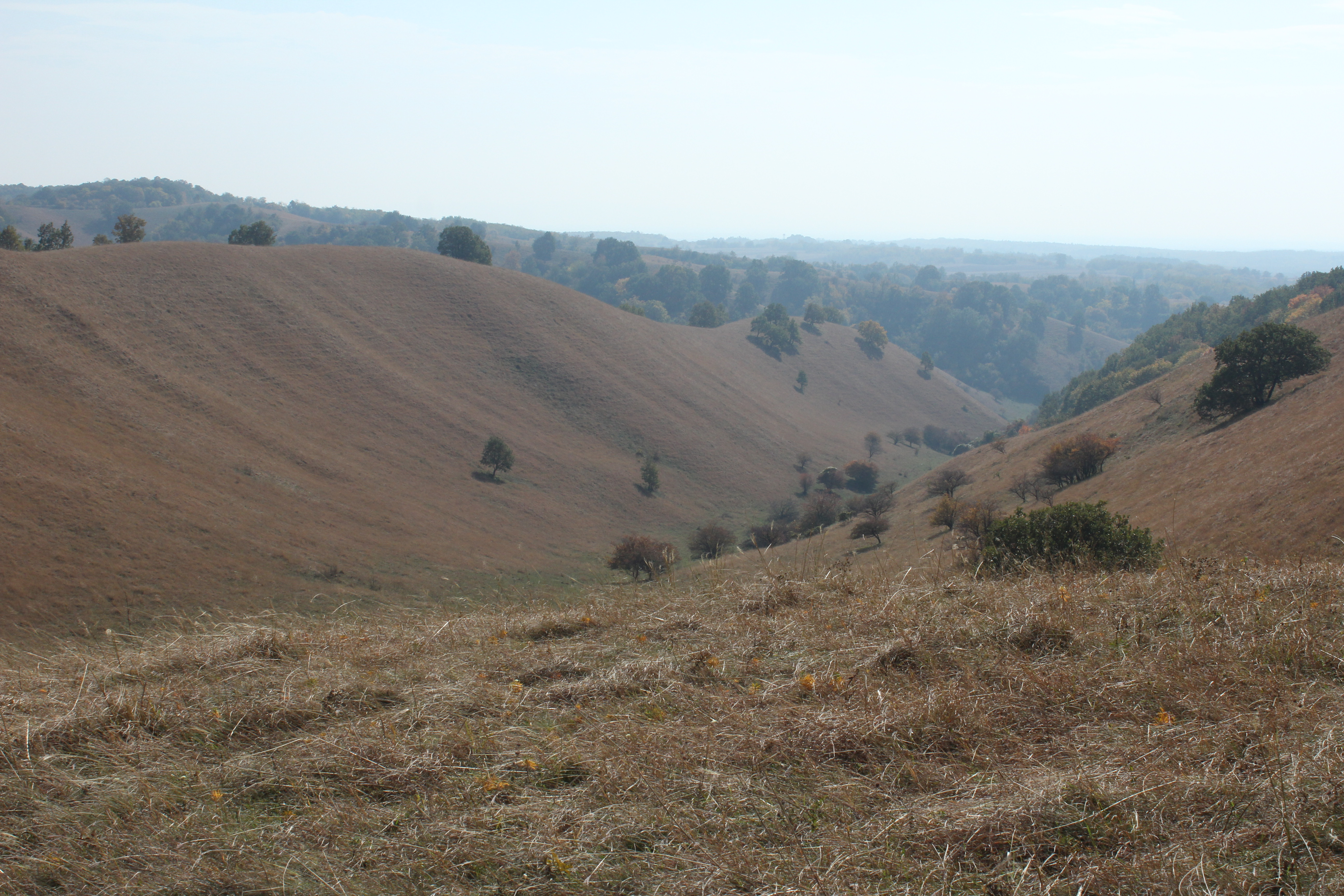

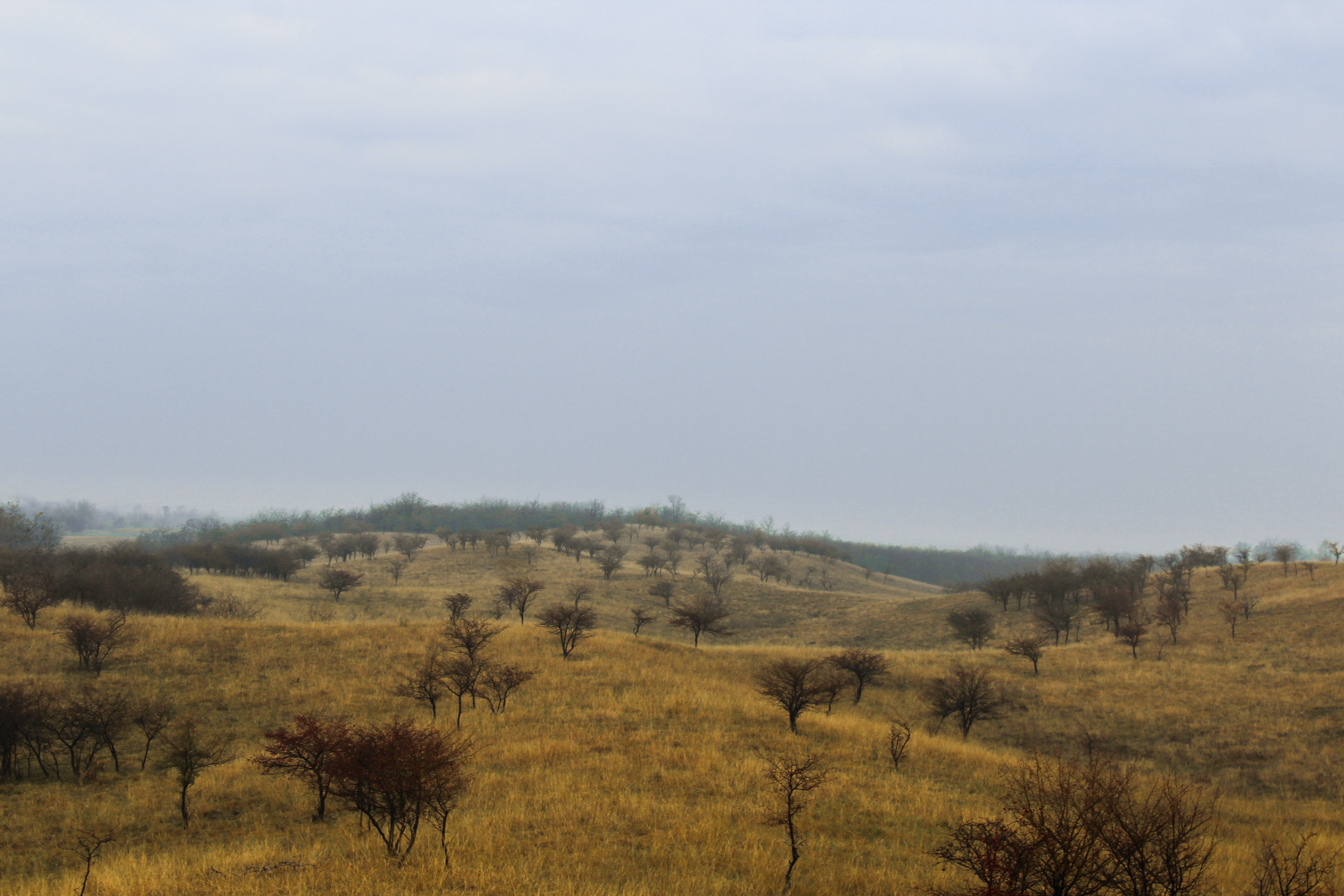

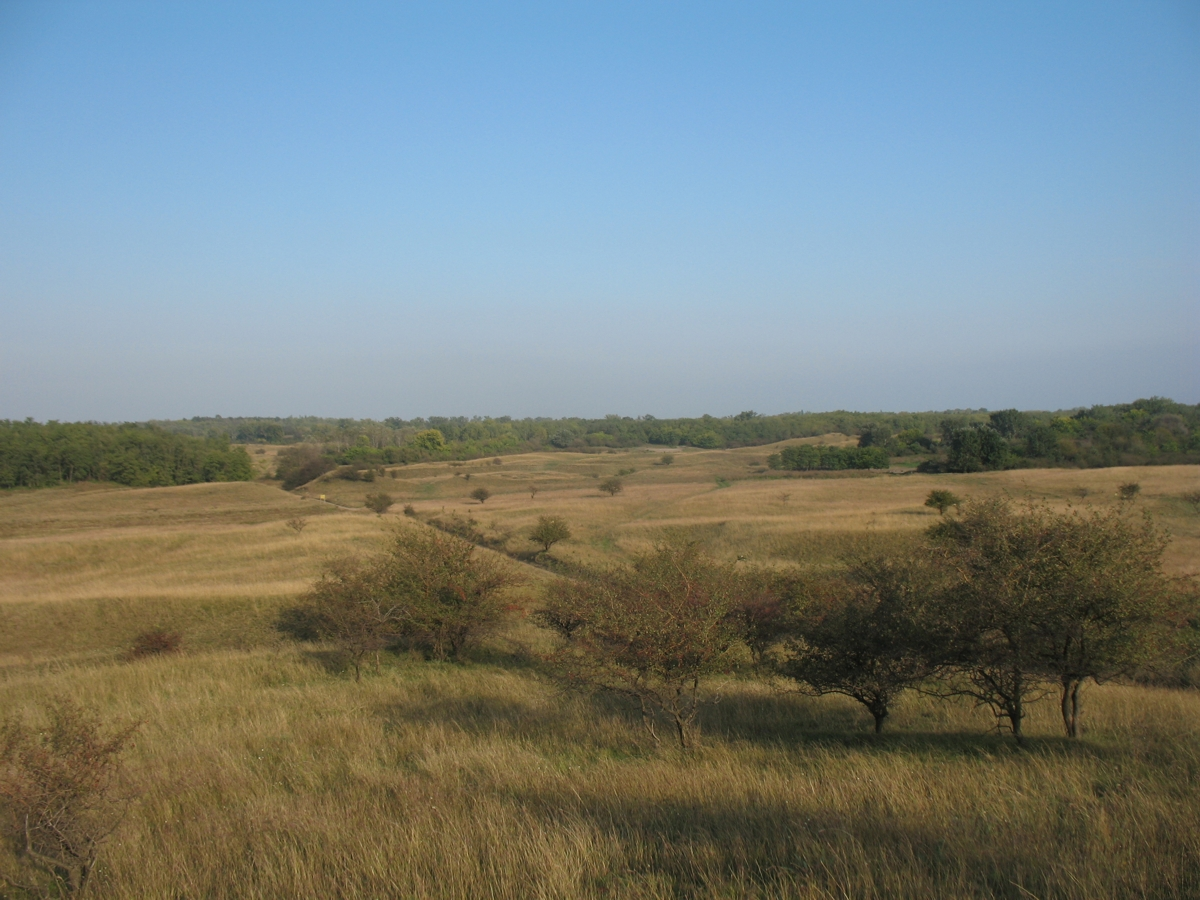

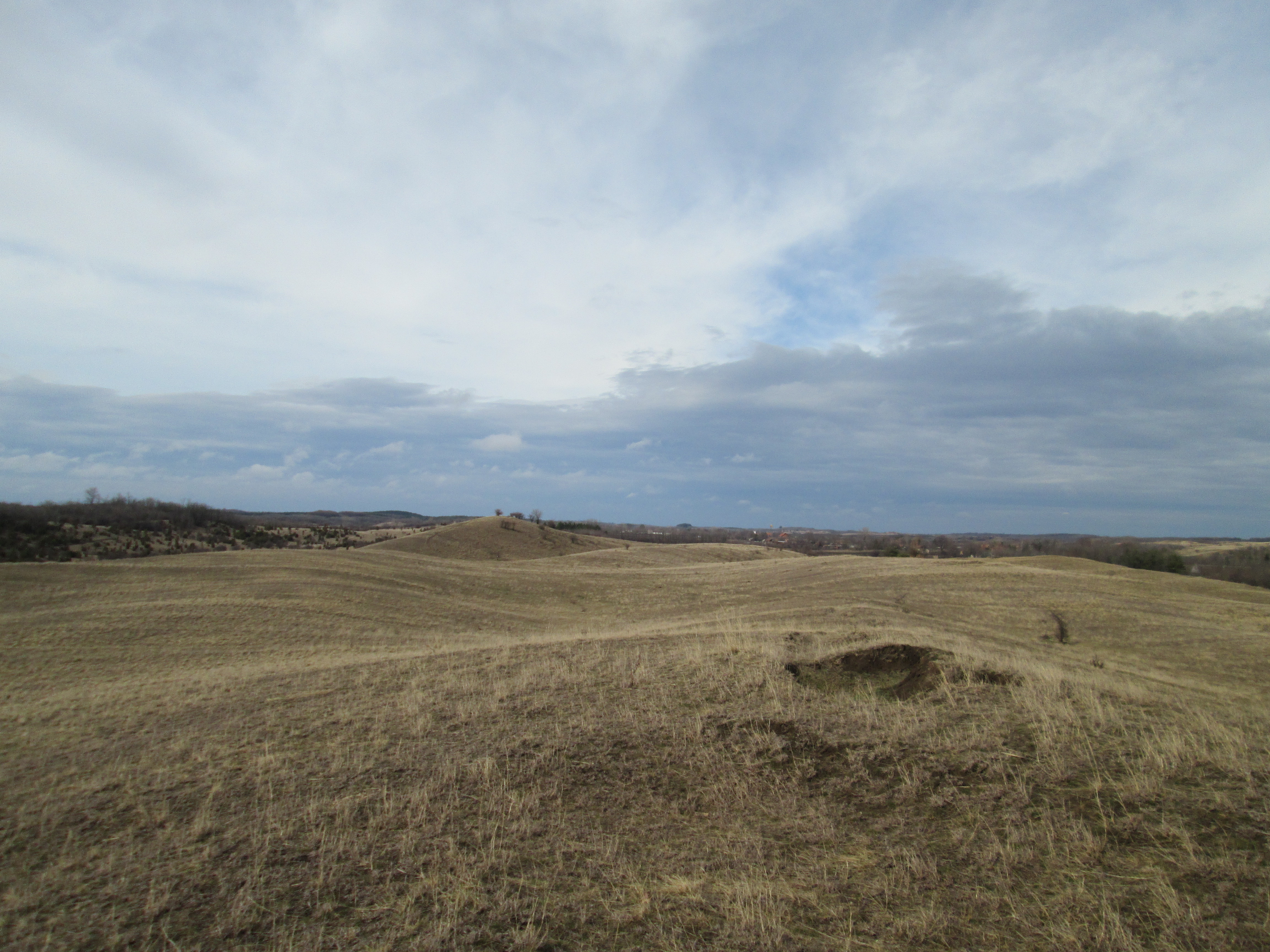

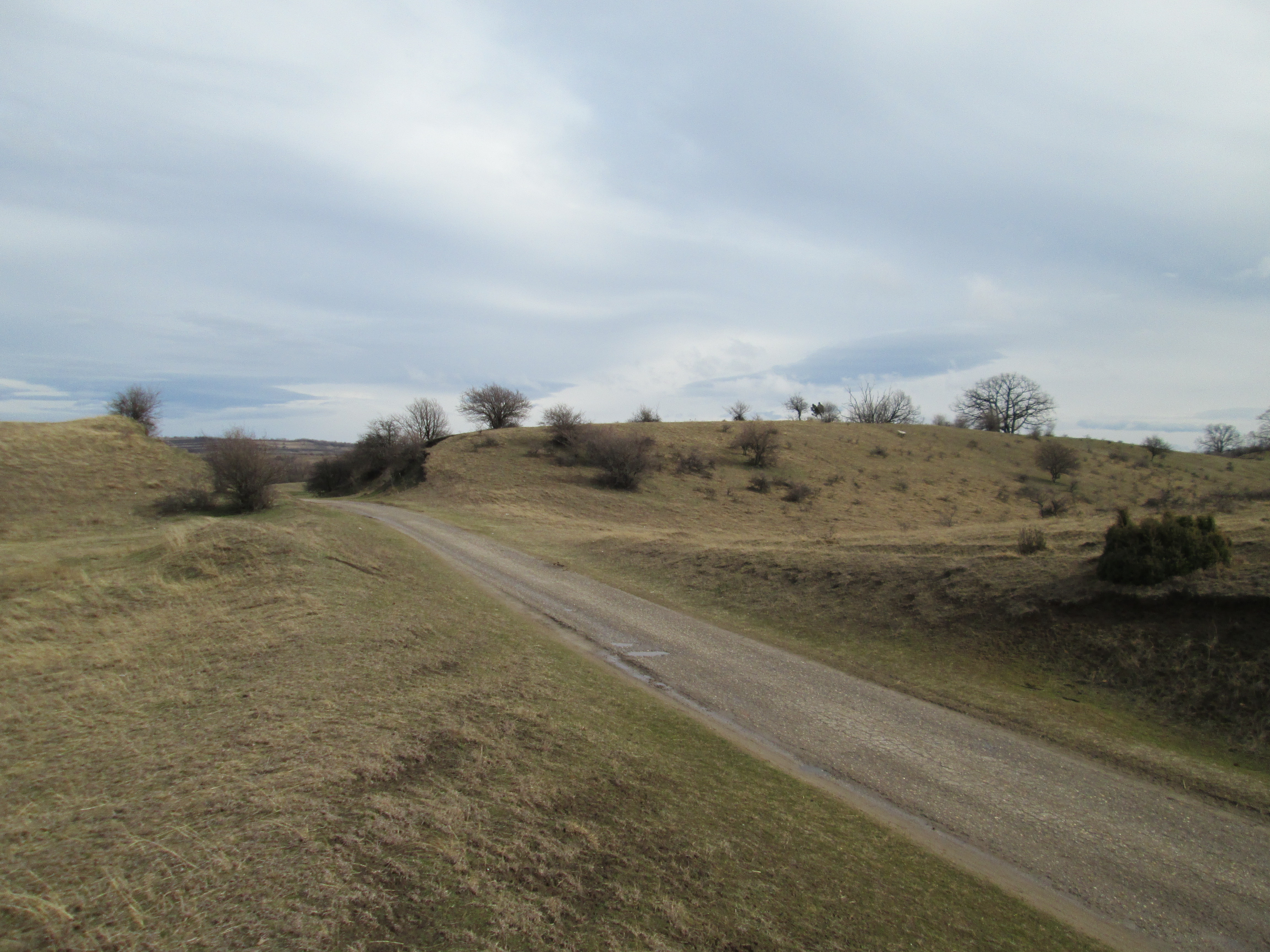

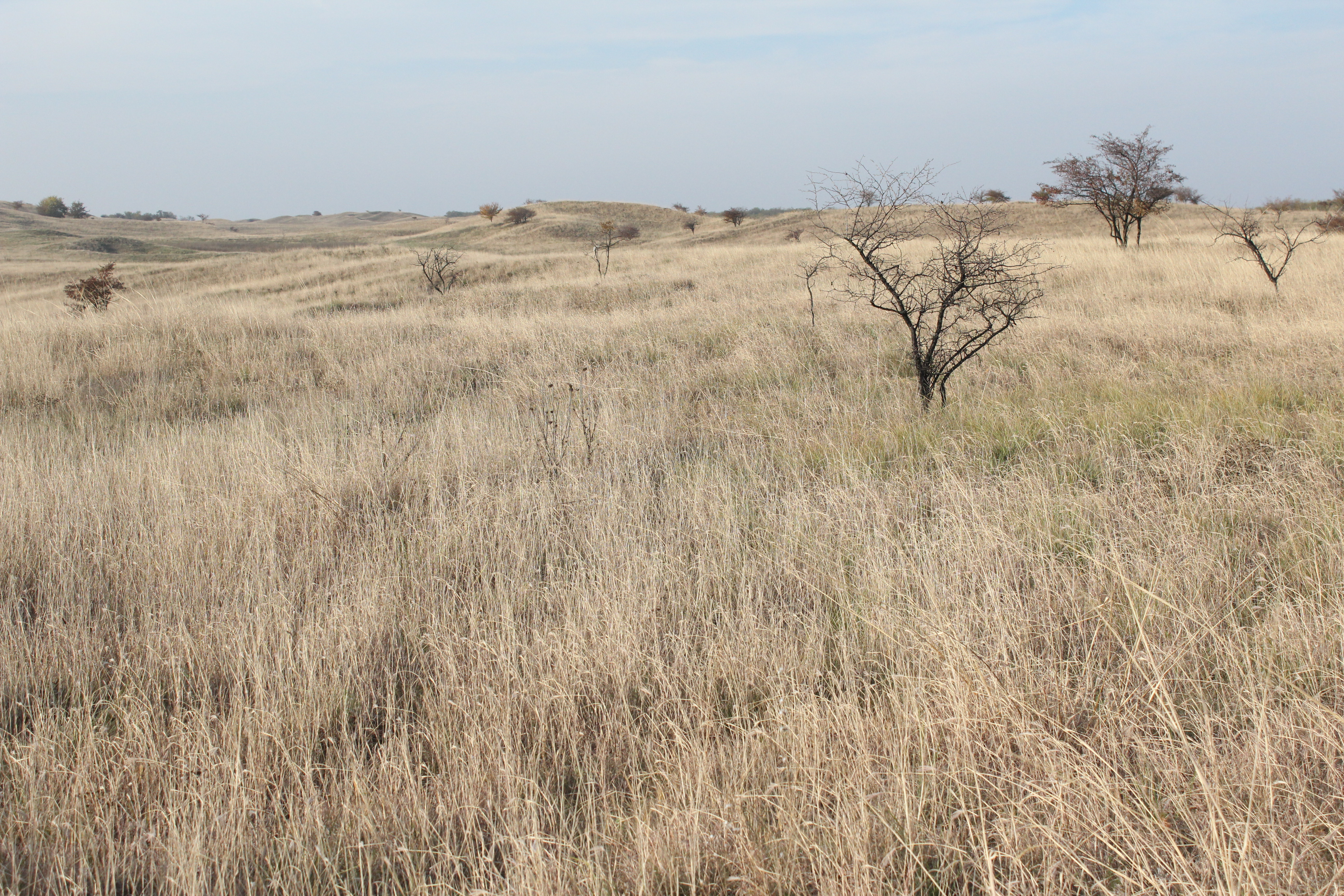

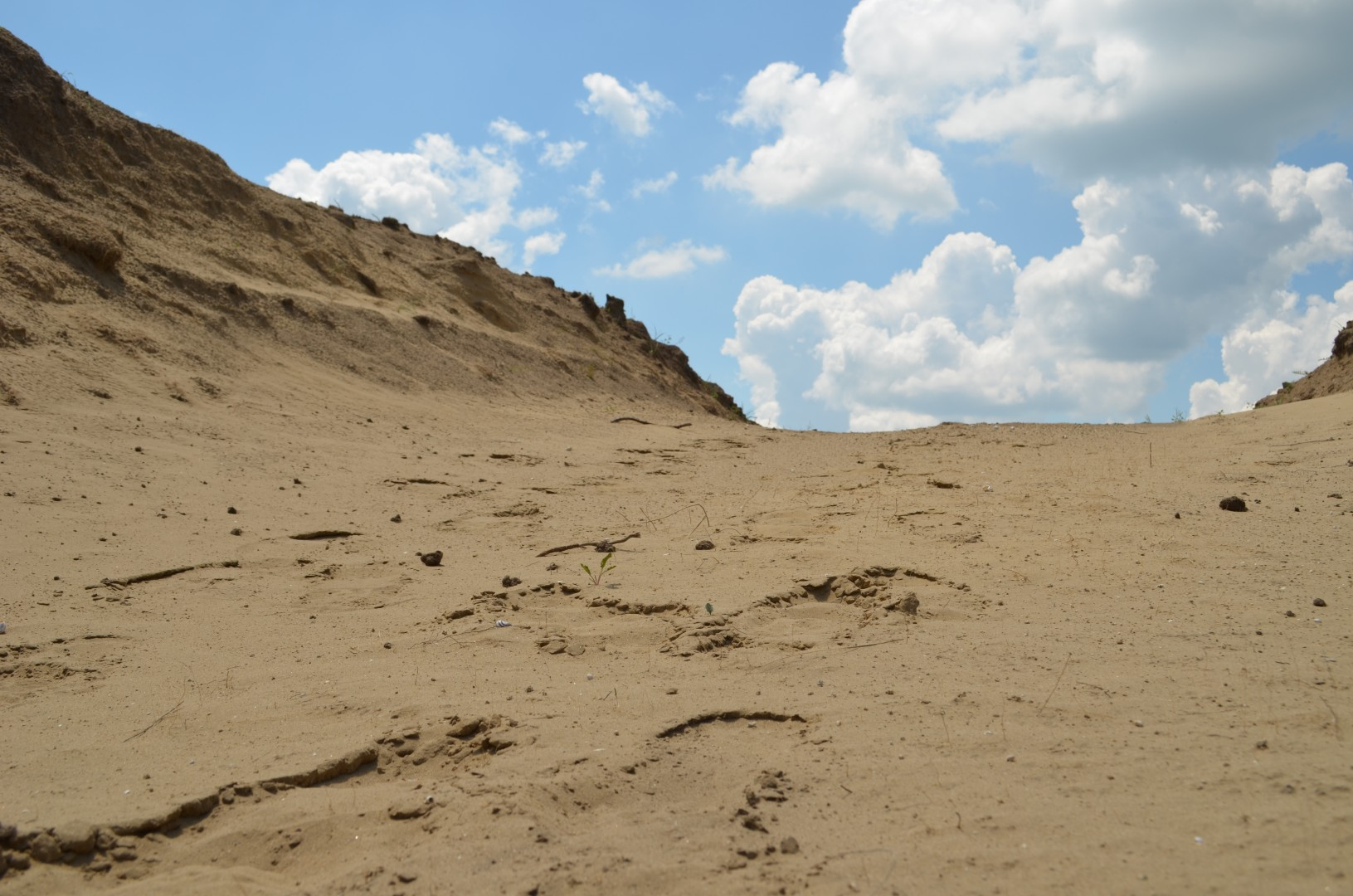

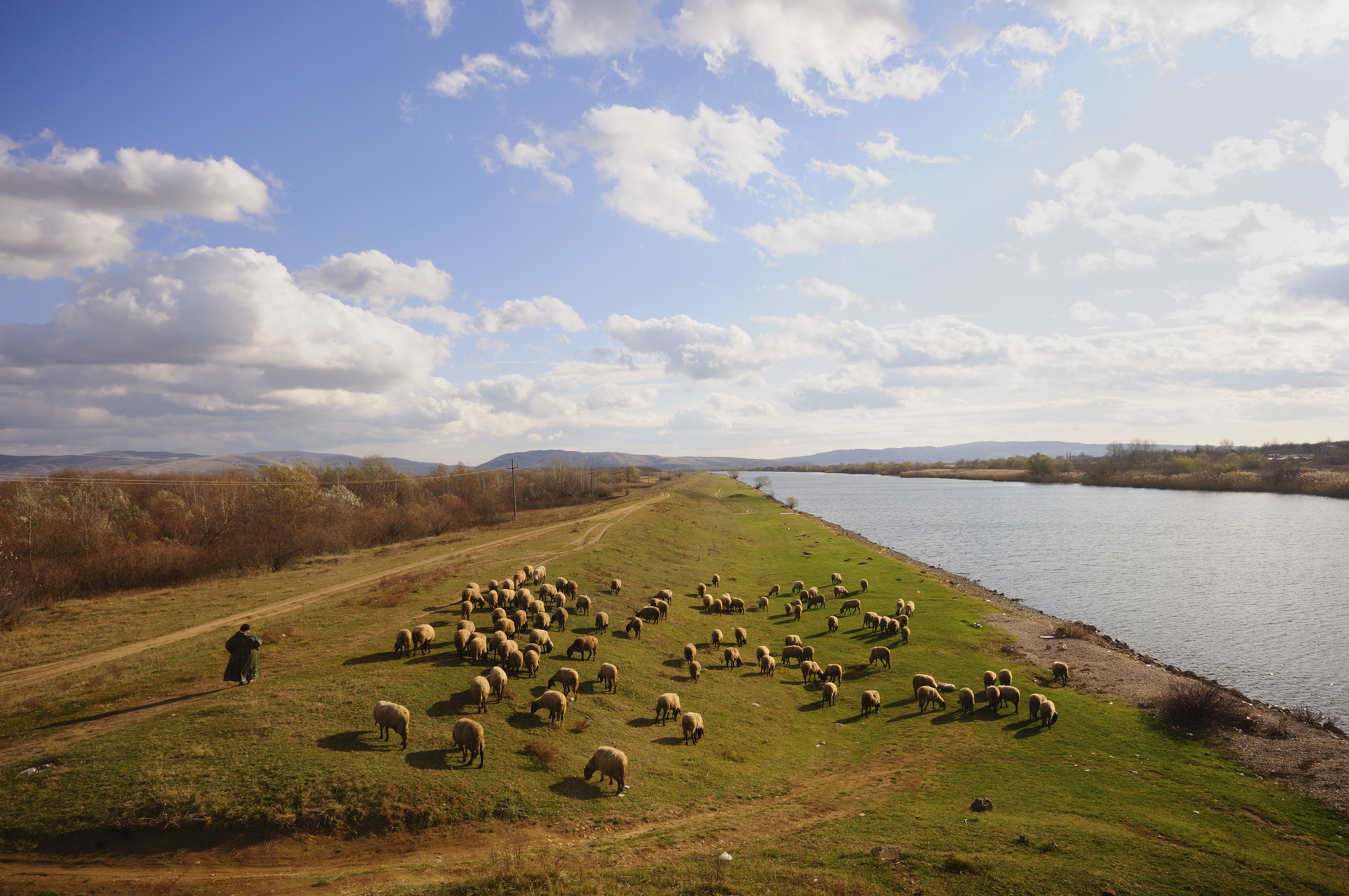
Danube–Tisa–Danube Canal near Deliblato Sands

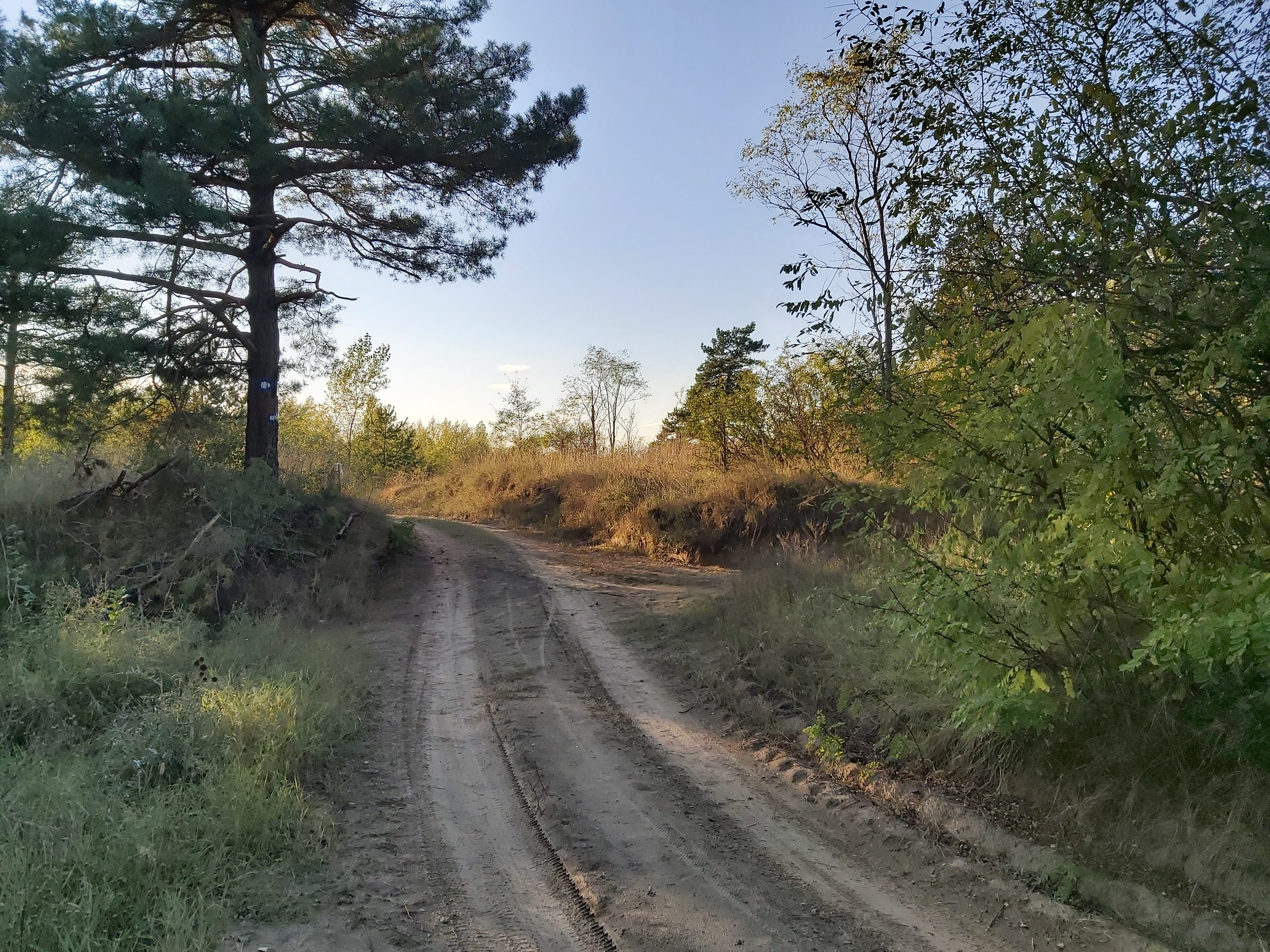

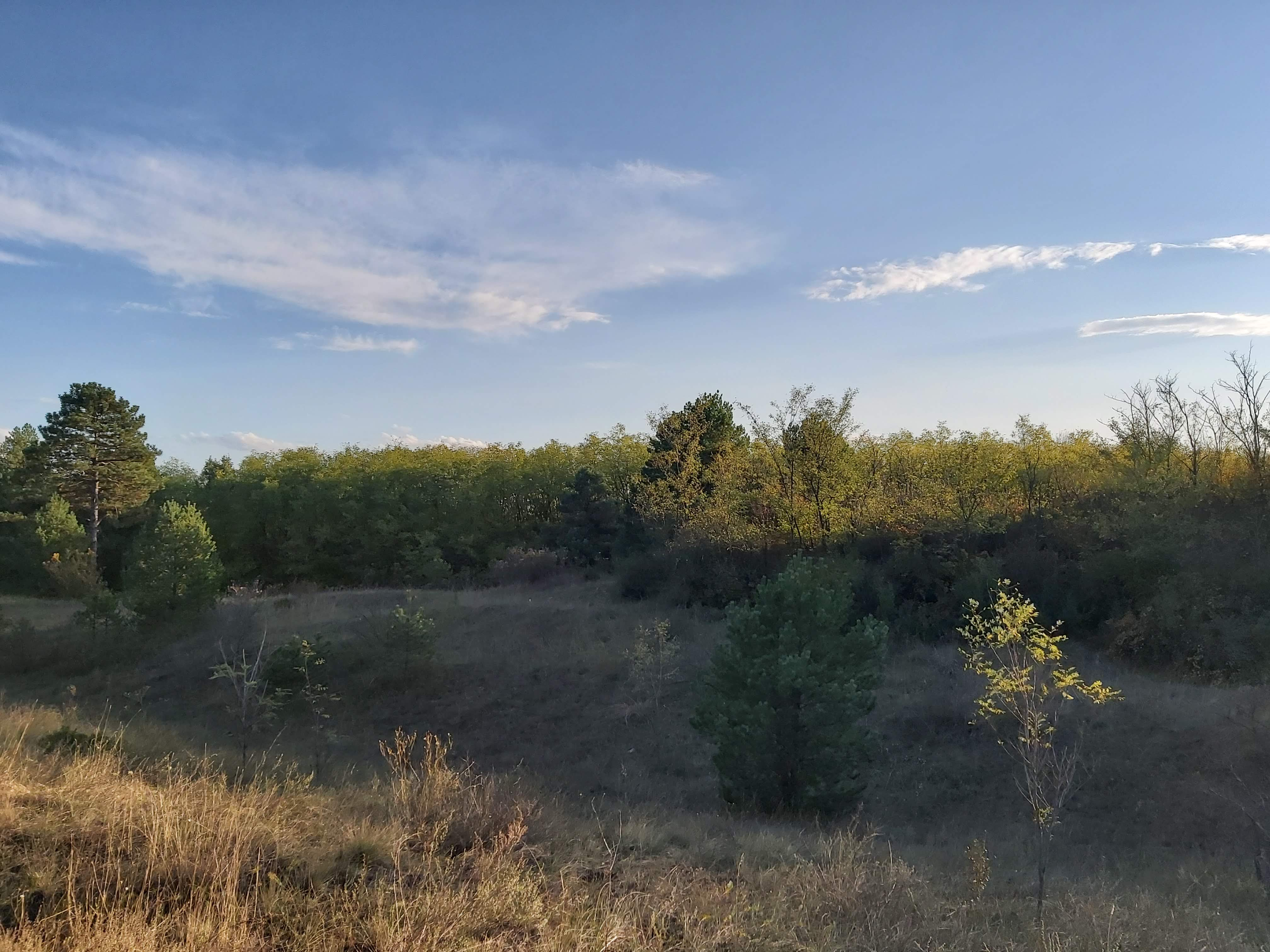

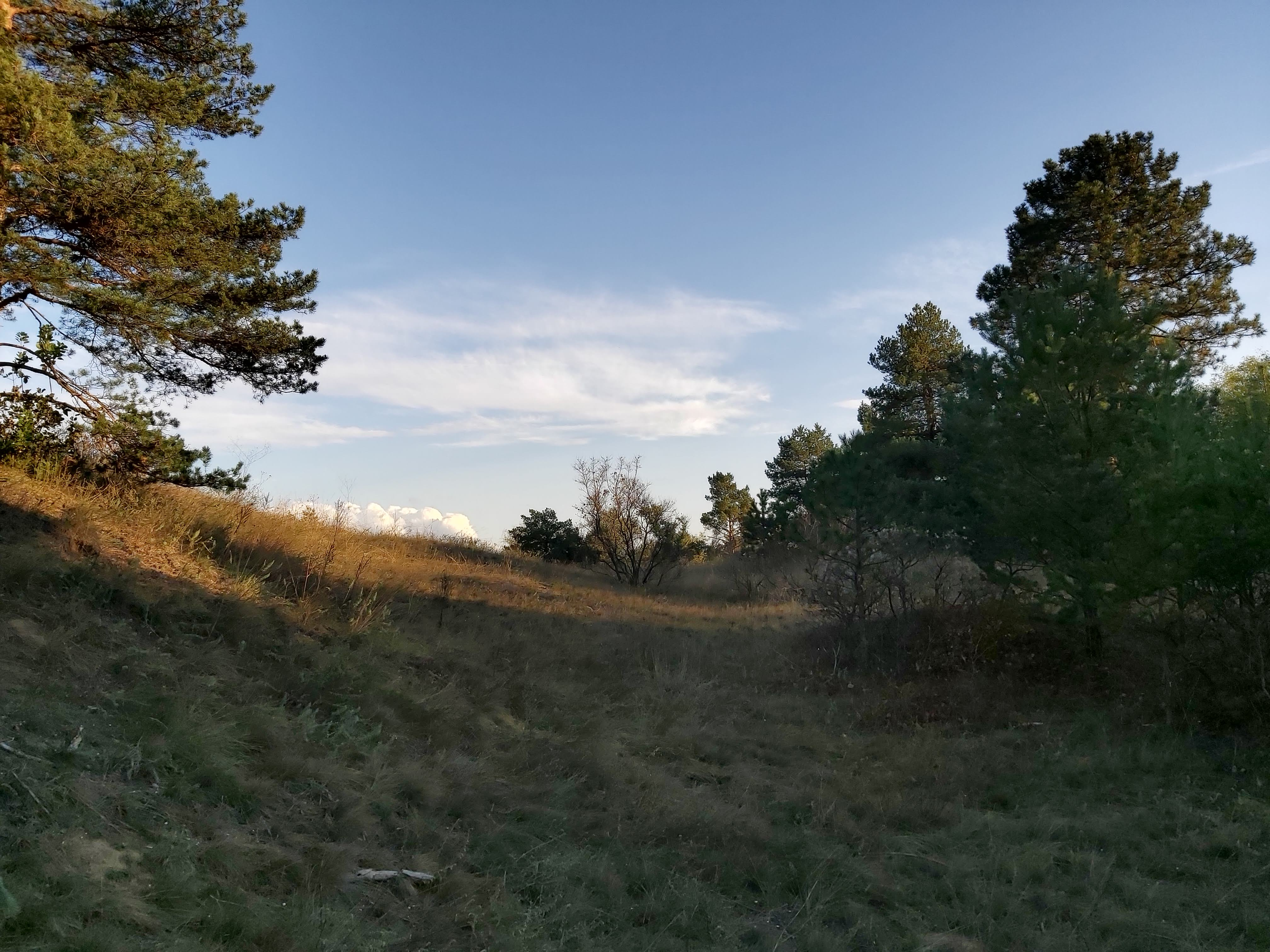

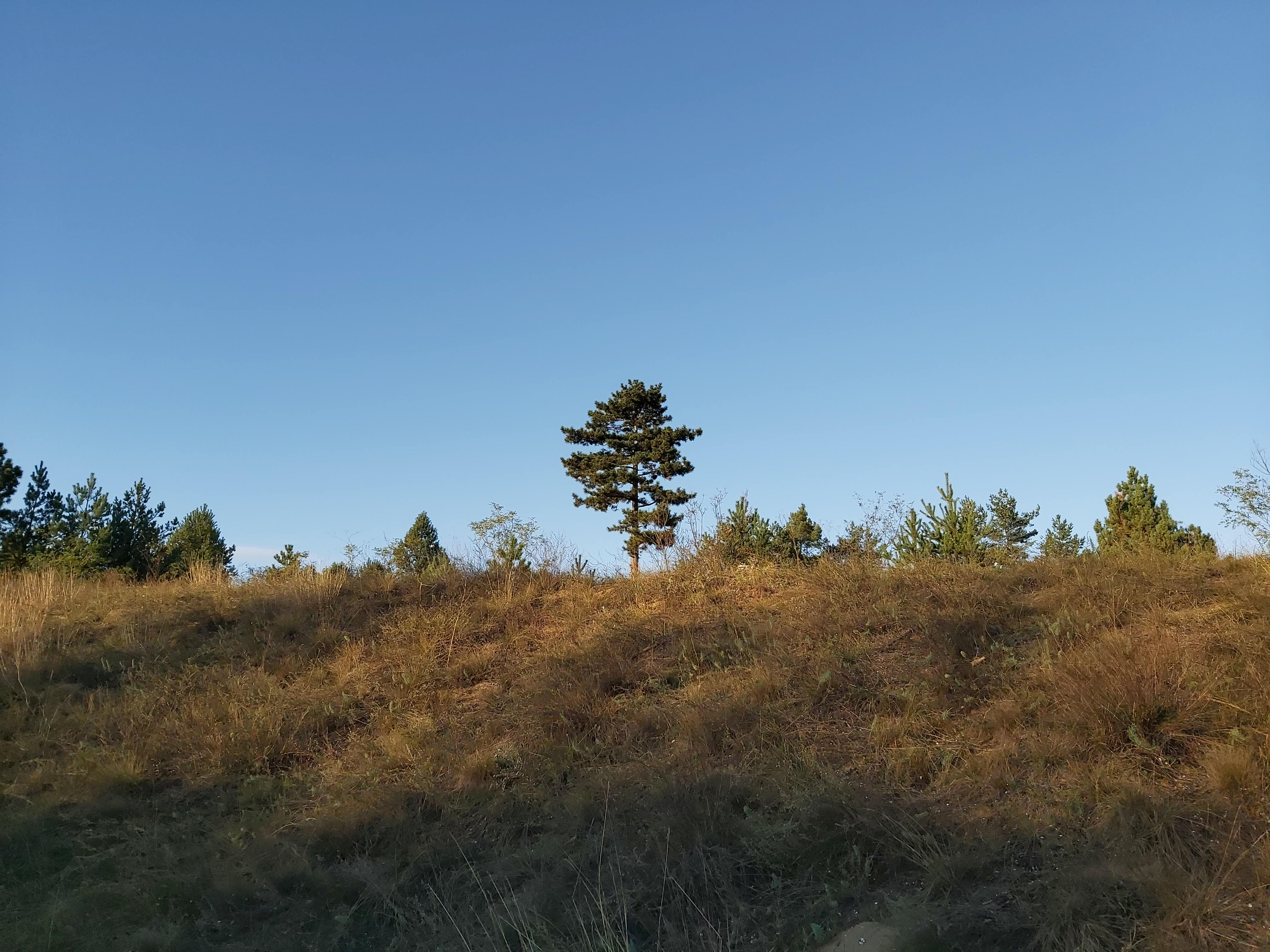

== See also ==
- 2026 Deliblato Sands wildfire
- Zagaj Hills (Zagajička Brda)
- Subotička Peščara
