= Čardak, Kovin =

Čardak is a former vacation settlement on the southern edge of the Deliblatska peščara (Deliblato Sands), in the community of Kovin in Serbia. It has served as a refugee camp since 1991. The camp is about 5 kilometres east of the village of Deliblato in the South Banat District.

During the Yugoslav Wars many Serbs fled from Croatia and Bosnia, or were driven out. Some of them found refuge in the former vacation settlement in Čardak. In 2005, about 200 people lived in the camp.
