= 2026 Deliblato Sands wildfire =

Wildfire in Serbia

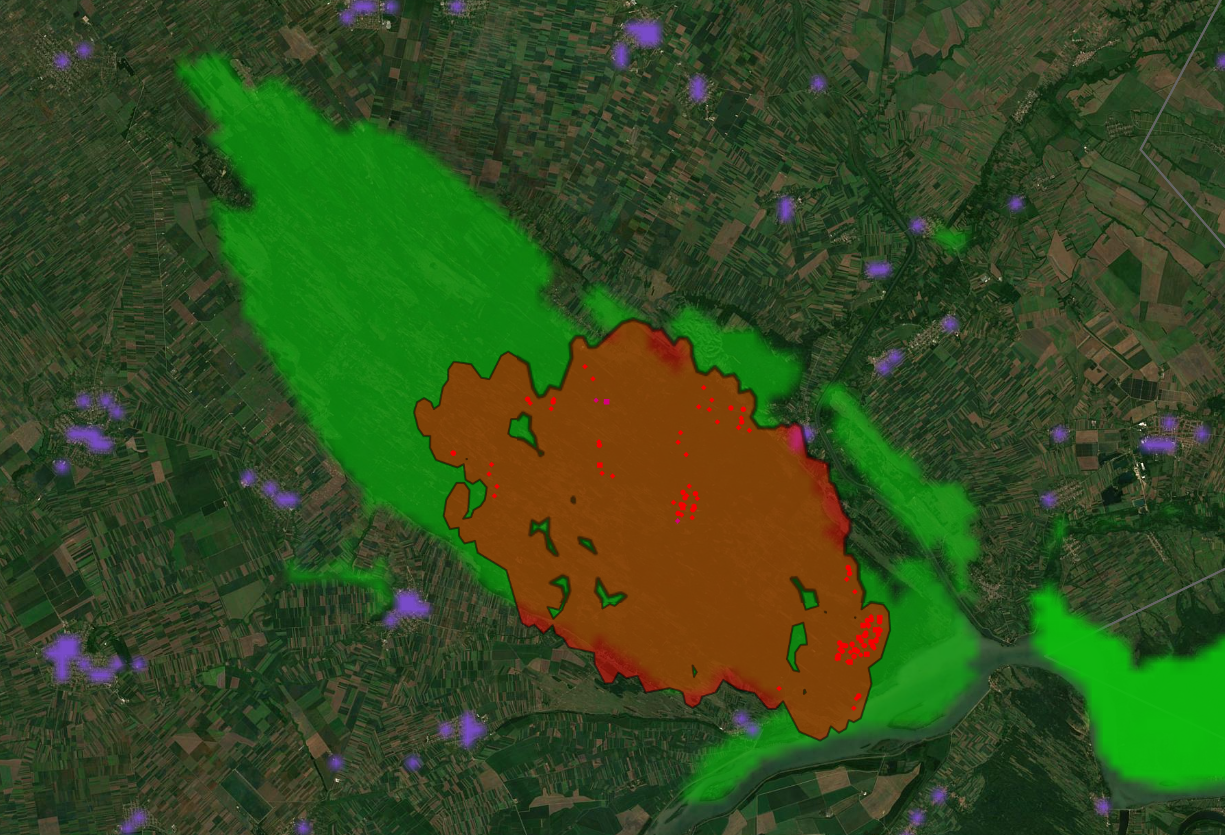
- Map of active fires (red) and burned areas (brown) in the Deliblato Sands on 23 August 2026, generated by the European Forest Fire Information System (EFFIS). Protected areas are shown in green, and human settlements in purple.
- Date: 21 July – 23 September 2026; (CET)
- Location: Deliblato Sands (Deliblatska Peščara), Vojvodina, Serbia
- Coordinates: 44°53′01″N 21°05′33″E

Statistics
- Status: Ongoing wildfire
- Perimeter: Approximately 50% (estimated) contained as of 23 August 2026
- Burned area: 3,500 hectares (8,600 acres)+
- Land use: Forest, steppe, meadow

Impacts
- Deaths: 0
- Injuries: 1 (minor)
- Missing people: 0
- Evacuated: About 50
- Structures destroyed: 0

Ignition
- Cause: Human activity (negligence or arson, suspected)
- Perpetrator: Unknown

Map
- Location of the wildfire in Serbia

The 2026 Deliblato Sands wildfire is a catastrophic wildfire that is burning in the Deliblato Sands (Deliblatska Peščara), a special nature reserve in the South Banat District of Vojvodina, Serbia. The fire, which started on 21 July 2026 and spiraled out of control on 5 August, has engulfed over 3,500 hectares (8,600 acres) of the unique sandy landscape, often referred to as the "European Sahara". Hundreds of firefighters, members of the Serbian Emergency Management Sector, the Serbian Armed Forces, and volunteers have been involved in the firefighting effort, with assistance from a Russian Ilyushin Il-76 firefighting aircraft and helicopters from the European Union. The blaze is the worst in the Deliblato Sands since 1996, when 7,000 hectares (17,000 acres) burned.

== Timeline ==
The first fire in the Deliblato Sands was detected on 21 July 2026 using an early-detection video monitoring system. Firefighting teams quickly contained and extinguished it. However, new fires broke out on 26 July and 2 August, which were also brought under control.

At approximately 13:00 on 5 August 2026, a new fire broke out in the central zone of the reserve. Due to strong winds, which frequently changed direction, the fire rapidly expanded and surrounded firefighters, one of whom suffered minor injuries. From that point, the fire spread uncontrollably, affecting nearby hunting grounds.

Over the following weeks, the fire expanded further. By 17 August, one-third of the reserve's total area had burned. By 22 August, more than 3,500 hectares (8,600 acres) had burned, representing about 10% of the total area of the Deliblato Sands. Estimates of the affected area have varied from 3,500 to 10,000 hectares (8,600 to 24,700 acres).

The fire reached the outskirts of the settlements of Šumarak, Kajtasovo, Grebenac, and the hamlet of Trujino. Due to the danger, a state of emergency was declared in parts of the municipality of Bela Crkva, and the population of Trujino was evacuated. Residents of Grebenac fled amid dramatic scenes as the fire reached their yards.

Firefighting efforts have been severely hampered by dry weather, strong winds, and extreme temperatures reaching up to 40 °C (104 °F). Smoke from the Deliblato Sands reached as far as Timișoara in Romania, and the air in Vršac was heavily polluted, with a yellow haze and ash falling everywhere.

== Cause ==
The exact cause of the fire has not been officially determined, but it is suspected to be the result of human activity, either negligence or arson. Similar fires in the past, including the catastrophic fire of 1996, were also attributed to human carelessness.

== Impact ==
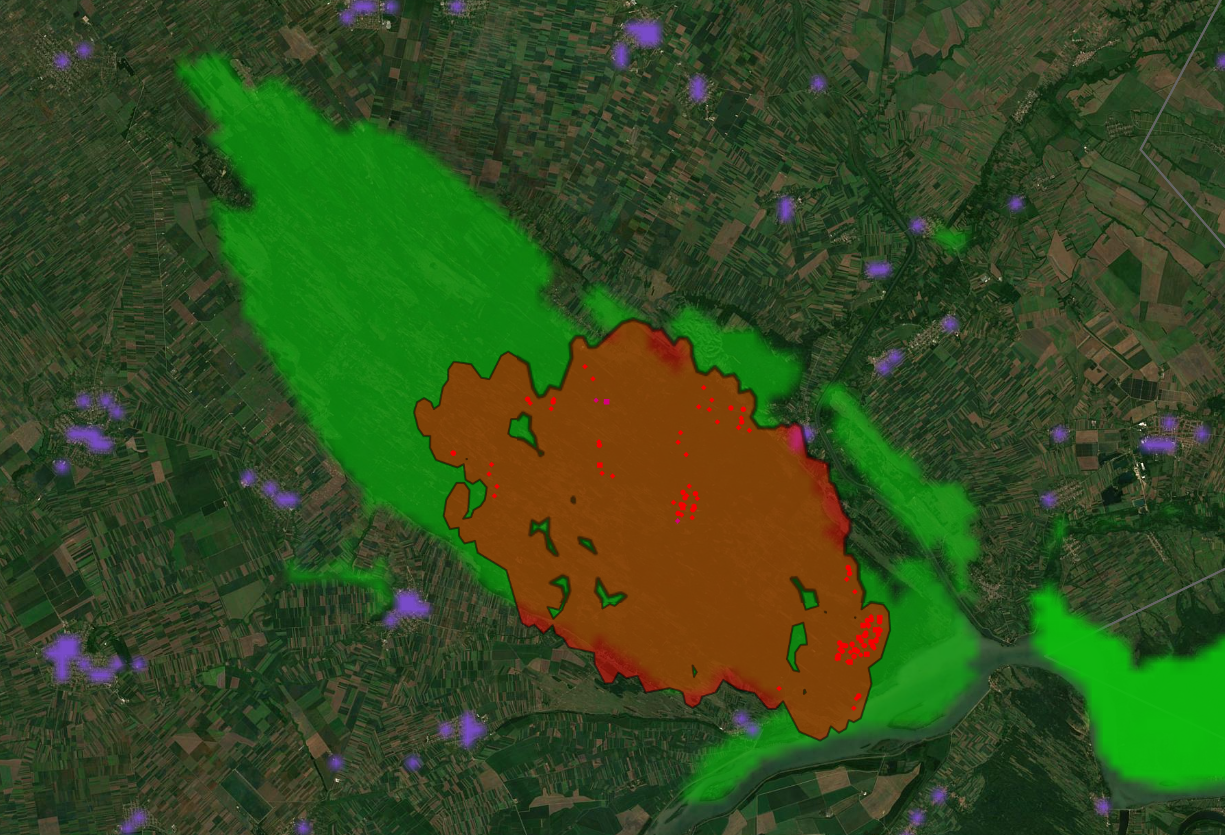
Map of active fires and burned areas in the Deliblato Sands generated on 23 August 2026 using the EFFIS platform (Copernicus Emergency Management Service). Legend: • Red — active fires (VIIRS) • Brown — burned areas (MODIS & VIIRS NRT) • Green — protected areas (Protected Areas Layer) • Purple — human settlements (Human Settlement Layer) Parameters used: • Map Options: Human Settlement Layer, Protected Areas Layer • Forecasts Date: 23 August 2026 • Rapid Damage Assessment: 22–23 August 2026 • Active Fires: VIIRS (all) • Burnt Areas: MODIS & VIIRS NRT (BA Yearly) Source: European Forest Fire Information System (EFFIS) – Copernicus EMS

The fire has caused immense ecological damage to the Deliblato Sands, a unique habitat which is home to approximately 900 species of higher plants, many of which are relict and rare, as well as numerous rare bird and mammal species. Large areas of forest, steppe, and meadow have been destroyed.

Professor Nenad Petrović of the Faculty of Forestry at the University of Belgrade stated that the damage would likely be enormous, particularly in ecological terms, and that it would take years for the complex ecosystem to recover. He emphasized that recovery would require time, money, and expertise, and that the consequences of a forest fire cannot be remedied by simple and quick interventions.

To help wildlife, the public enterprise Vojvodinašume opened the gates of all fenced hunting grounds so that animals could escape to areas not affected by the fire, and additional watering points were provided.

There have been no human fatalities, but one firefighter sustained minor injuries. No material damage to structures has been reported, but the ecological loss is considered incalculable.

== International assistance ==
Due to the prolonged and unsuccessful battle against the fire, Serbia activated the EU Civil Protection Mechanism. The European Union dispatched four RescEU Black Hawk helicopters – two from the Czech Republic, one from Slovakia, and one from Romania – as well as ground teams from Germany and Romania.

The Romanian ground intervention team, comprising 69 personnel and 15 vehicles, was dispatched to Serbia on 22 August. The Romanian S-70M Black Hawk helicopter is part of the European RescEU reserve. EU Commissioner for Equality, Preparedness and Crisis Management Hadja Lahbib confirmed the deployment.

Prior to that, Serbia received assistance from a Russian Ilyushin Il-76 firefighting aircraft, which made ten drops on 20 and 21 August, releasing a total of 420 tons of water. In total, five helicopters (three from the Serbian Ministry of Interior and two from the EU) have been engaged, dropping a total of 370 tons of water.

Interior Minister Ivica Dačić stated that Serbia had formally and informally inquired about the possibility of additional aircraft, and that the decision to engage the Russian aircraft was based on the assessment by the Emergency Situations Command, as it is a high-capacity aircraft (carrying about 42 tons of water) that can significantly assist in firefighting.

== Reactions ==
President of Serbia Aleksandar Vučić visited the affected area on 23 August. Prime Minister Đuro Macut and Interior Minister Ivica Dačić had previously visited the area. Prime Minister Macut stated that an improvement in weather conditions was expected within the next seven to ten days.

Local residents and volunteers have been actively involved in the firefighting effort, assisting and opening their homes to emergency crews. Many citizens and media outlets expressed concern over the scale of the fire and its ecological consequences.

Professor Petrović emphasized that this fire should serve as an impetus to review and improve the fire protection system, especially in light of climate change and prolonged periods of high temperatures, noting that it is much better and cheaper to have a robust early warning and prevention system.

== Gallery ==
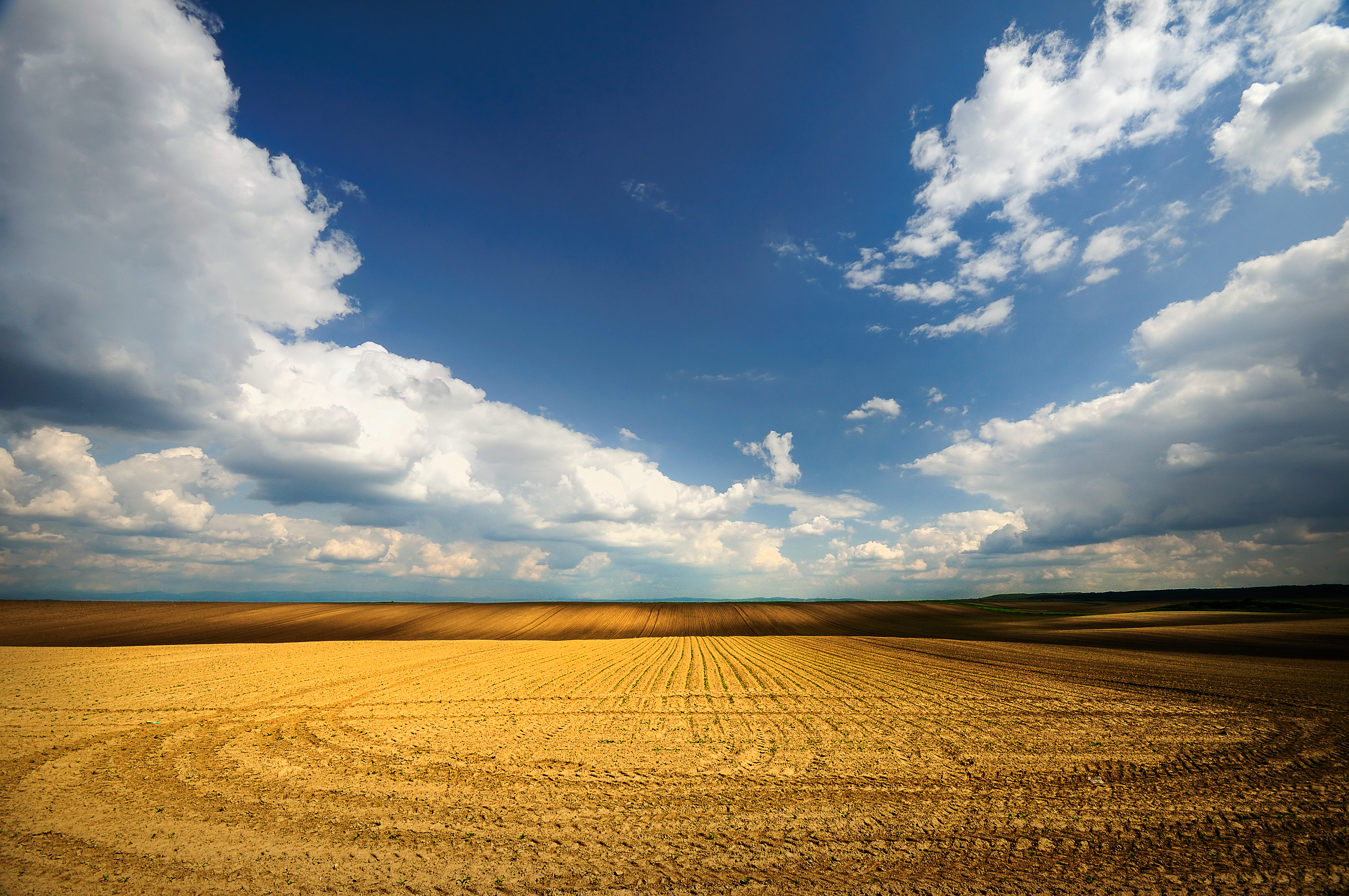
Deliblato Sands landscape

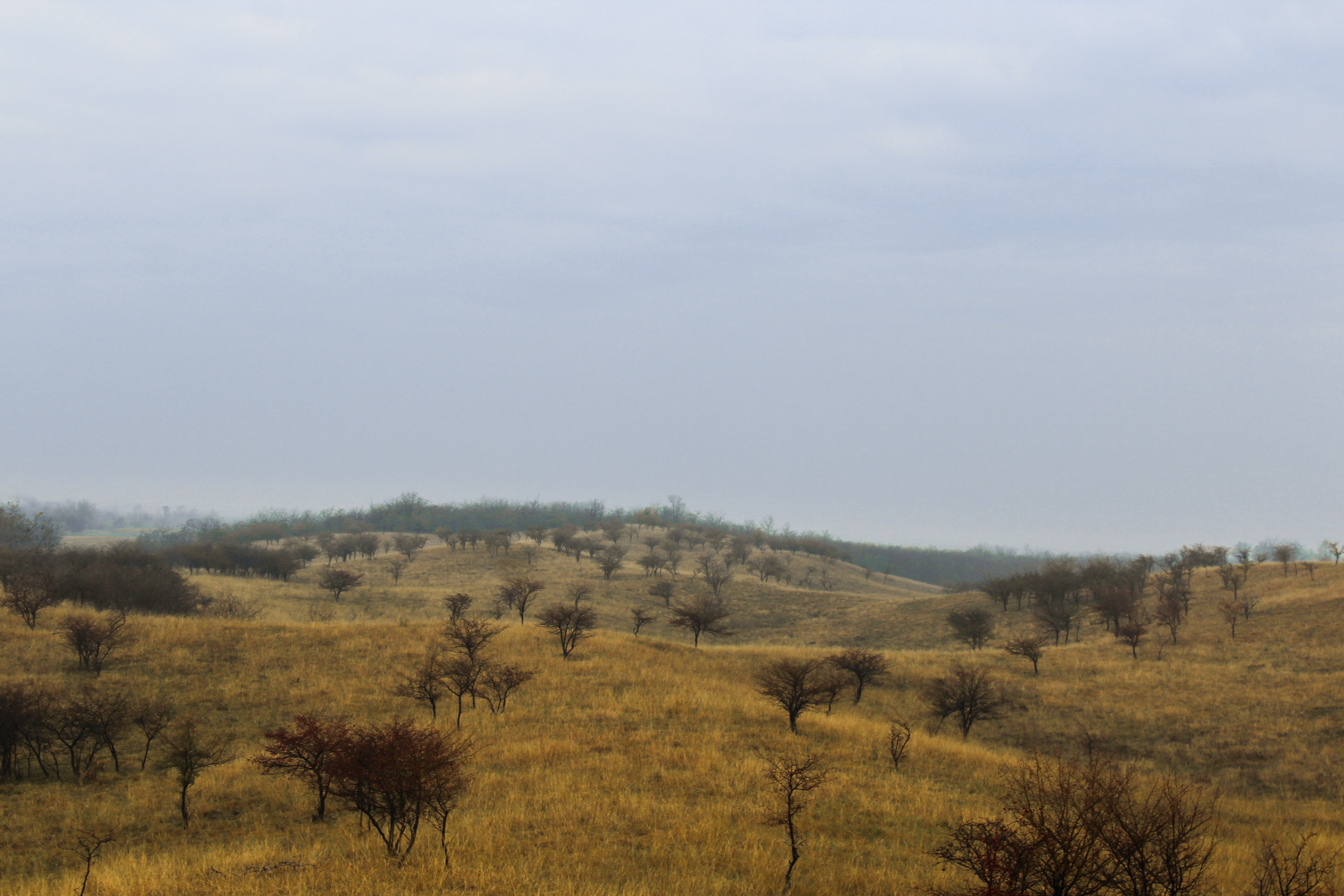
Deliblato Sands at dawn

== See also ==
- Deliblato Sands
- Wildfires in Serbia
- Special Nature Reserve Deliblato Sands
