= Violeta Ocokoljić =

Serbian politician

Violeta Ocokoljić (Serbian Cyrillic: Виолета Оцокољић; born 1988) is a politician in Serbia. She has served in the National Assembly of Serbia since 2020 as a member of the Serbian Progressive Party.

== Early life and education ==
Ocokoljić was born in Kovin, Vojvodina, in what was then the Socialist Republic of Serbia in the Socialist Federal Republic of Yugoslavia. She has a bachelor's degree in tourism.

== Career ==
She is a member of the Progressive Party's municipal board in Kovin and has been a member of the party's Academy of Young Leaders program.

=== Municipal politics ===
Ocokoljić was appointed as a member of the Kovin municipal council (i.e., the executive branch of the municipal government) on 22 October 2015, with responsibility for tourism.

She received the fourth position on the Progressive Party's electoral list for the Kovin municipal assembly in the 2017 local elections and was elected when the list won a plurality victory with twenty-two out of forty-five seats. She was re-appointed to municipal council following the election, again with responsibility for tourism. She resigned from this position in February 2018, when she began working in the municipal administration as a tourism inspector. In February 2020, she was appointed to a provisional authority that governed Kovin pending new municipal elections.

She was given the second position on the Progressive Party's list in the 2020 local elections and was elected to a second term when the list won a majority victory with thirty-three seats.

=== Parliamentarian ===
Ocokoljić received the 168th position on the Progressive Party's Aleksandar Vučić – Serbia Is Winning list in the 2016 Serbian parliamentary election. The list won 131 out of 250 mandates, and she was not returned. She was given the 179th position on the successor Aleksandar Vučić — For Our Children list in the 2020 parliamentary election and was elected when the list won a landslide majority with 188 mandates. She is a member of the assembly committee on constitutional and legislative issues; a deputy member of the committee on the rights of the child and the committee on administrative, budgetary, mandate, and immunity issues; the head of Serbia's parliamentary friendship group with Malawi; and a member of the parliamentary friendship groups with Algeria, Argentina, Australia, Austria, Chile, China, Croatia, the Czech Republic, Egypt, Germany, Greece, Indonesia, Israel, Japan, Jordan, Malta, Norway, Portugal, Russia, Switzerland, Turkey, the United Kingdom, and the United States of America.
