= Šumarak =

Šumarak Шумарак
- Village (Selo)
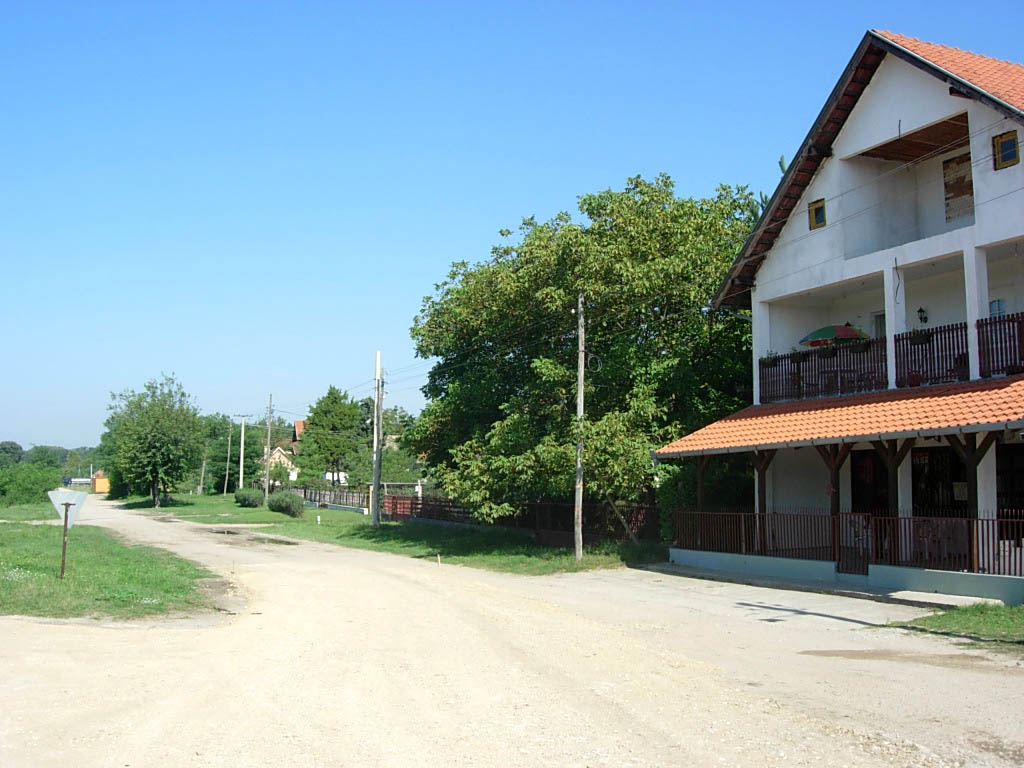
- Street detail

- Location of Šumarak within Serbia Šumarak (Serbia) Šumarak (Europe)
- Coordinates: 44°49′10″N 21°08′14″E
- Country: Serbia
- Province: Vojvodina
- District: South Banat
- Municipality: Kovin
- Elevation: 100 m (330 ft)

Population (2002)
  - Šumarak: 180
- Time zone: UTC+1 (CET)
  - Summer (DST): UTC+2 (CEST)
- Area code: +381(0)13
- Car plates: KO

Šumarak is a village in Serbia. It is situated in the Kovin municipality, in the South Banat District, Vojvodina province.

== Name ==
Other names of the village: Serbian Cyrillic: Шумарак, Hungarian: Emánueltelep.

== Historical population ==
- 1948: 233
- 1953: 231
- 1961: 192
- 1971: 241
- 1981: 168
- 1991: 109

== Ethnic groups ==
According to the last census from 2011, the village was ethnically mixed and largest ethnic group in the village were Serbs.

According to the older census from 2002, the population of the village numbered 180 people, including 62 Hungarians (34.44%), 54 Serbs (30%), and others. In 2006, the population numbered 177 people.

Year	Total	Hungarians	Serbs	Yugoslavs	Romanians	Romani	Croats	Montenegrins	Rest
1991	109	55.04%	15.59%	26.6%	0.00%	0.00%	0.91%	0.00%	2.04%
2002	180	34.44%	30.0%	3.33%	5.00%	1.66%	0.55%	0.55%	24.47%

== See also ==
- List of places in Serbia
- List of cities, towns and villages in Vojvodina
