= Malo Bavanište =

Malo Bavanište Мало Баваниште
- Village (Selo)
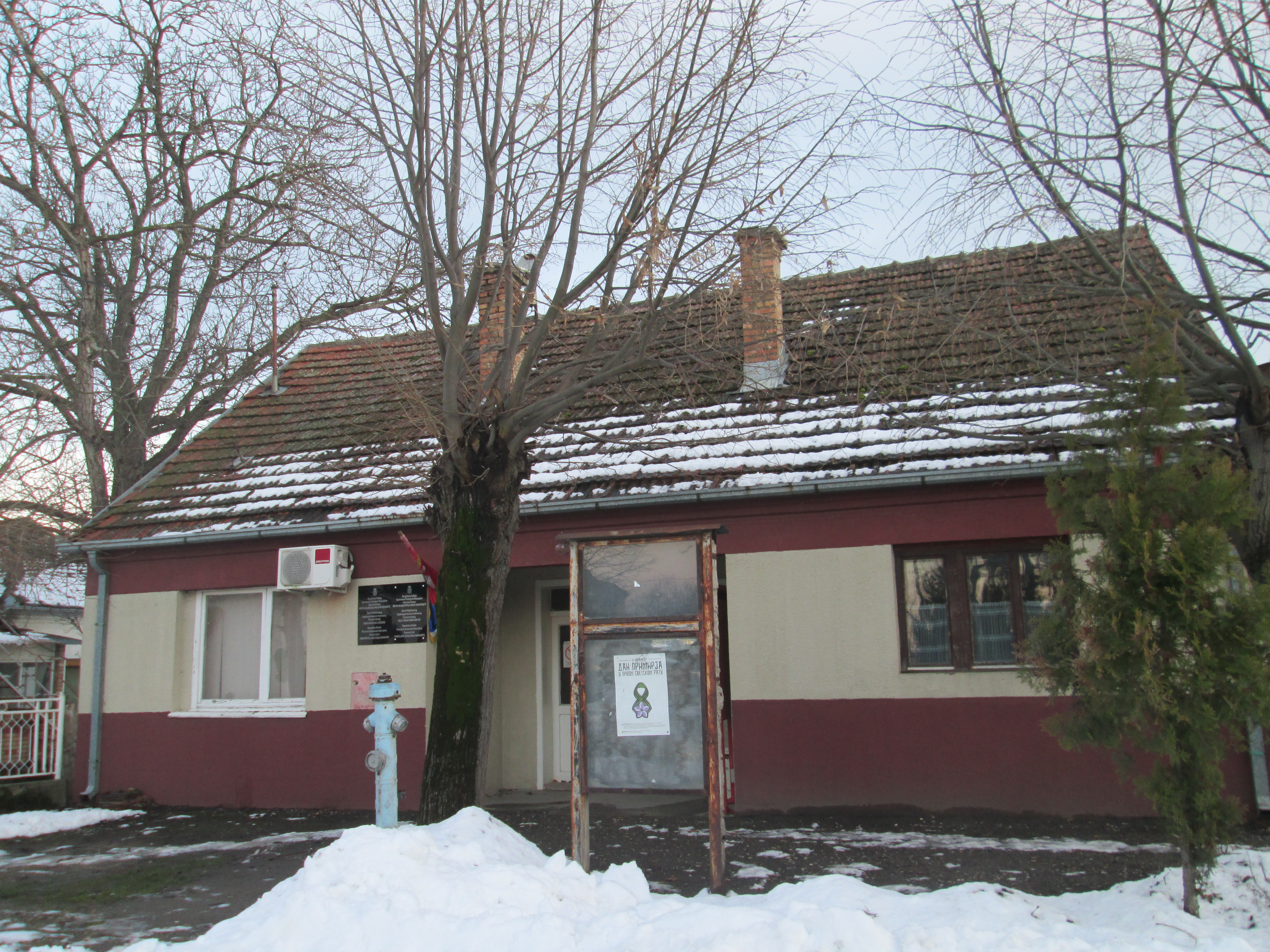

- Location of Malo Bavanište within Serbia Malo Bavanište (Serbia) Malo Bavanište (Europe)
- Coordinates: 44°44′53″N 21°04′59″E
- Country: Serbia
- Province: Vojvodina
- District: South Banat
- Municipality: Kovin

Population (2002)
  - Malo Bavanište: 420
- Time zone: UTC+1 (CET)
  - Summer (DST): UTC+2 (CEST)
- Area code: +381(0)13
- Car plates: KO

Malo Bavanište (Serbian Cyrillic: Мало Баваниште) is a village in Serbia. It is situated in the Kovin municipality, South Banat District, Vojvodina province. The village has a Serb ethnic majority (94.28%) and its population numbering 420 people (2002 census).

== Historical population ==
- 1961: 422
- 1971: 694
- 1981: 621
- 1991: 522
- 2002: 420

== See also ==
- List of places in Serbia
- List of cities, towns and villages in Vojvodina
