= Gaj, Kovin =

Gaj Гај
- Village (Selo)
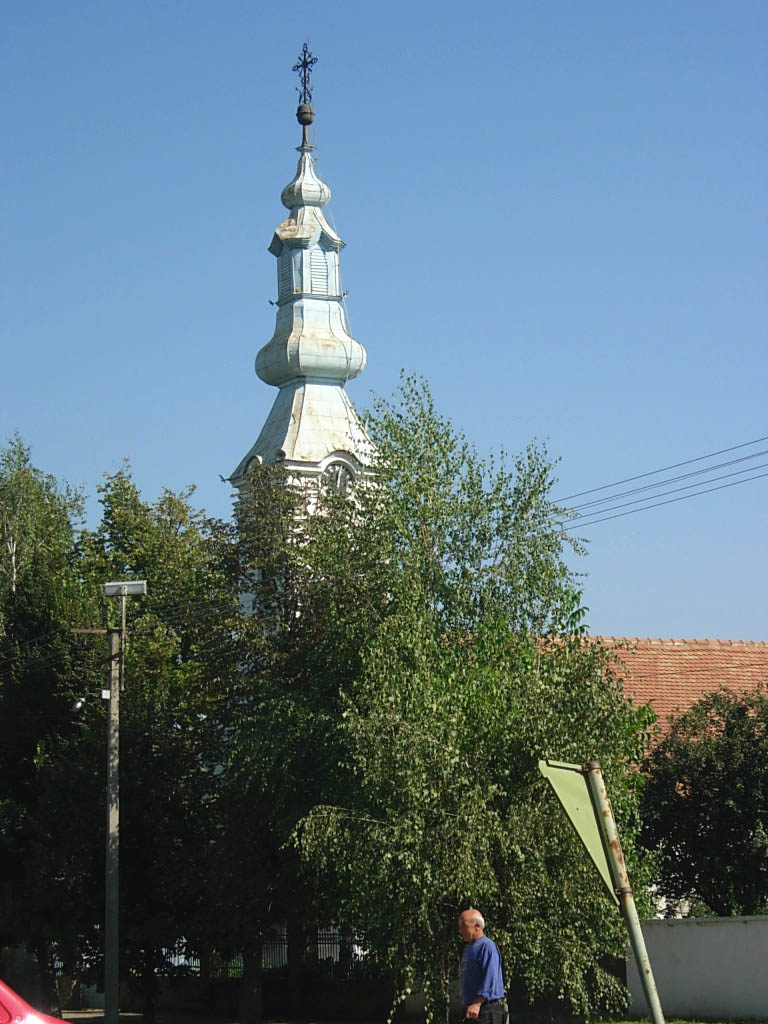
- The Orthodox Church

- Location of Gaj within Serbia Gaj (Serbia) Gaj (Europe)
- Coordinates: 44°47′16″N 21°03′29″E
- Country: Serbia
- Province: Vojvodina
- District: South Banat
- Municipality: Kovin
- Elevation: 64 m (210 ft)

Population (2002)
  - Gaj: 3,302
- Time zone: UTC+1 (CET)
  - Summer (DST): UTC+2 (CEST)
- Postal code: 26223
- Area code: +381(0)13
- Car plates: KO

Gaj (Serbian Cyrillic: Гај) is a village in Serbia. It is situated in the Kovin municipality, in the South Banat District, Vojvodina province. The village has a Serb ethnic majority (79.31%) and its population numbering 3,302 people (2002 census).

== Historical population ==
- 1961: 3,532
- 1971: 3,701
- 1981: 3,661
- 1991: 3,432

== Major ethnic groups ==
Year	Total	Serbs	Czechs	Hungarians	Romani	Yugoslavs	Romanians	Macedonians	Other
1991	3,432	82.54%	3.96%	3.67%	3.11%	2.94%	1.13%	0.29%	2.36%
2002	3,302	79.31%	4.14%	3.63%	5.78%	0.24%	0.96%	0.24%	5.74%

== See also ==
- List of places in Serbia
- List of cities, towns and villages in Vojvodina
