= Mramorak =

Mramorak Мраморак
- Village (Selo)
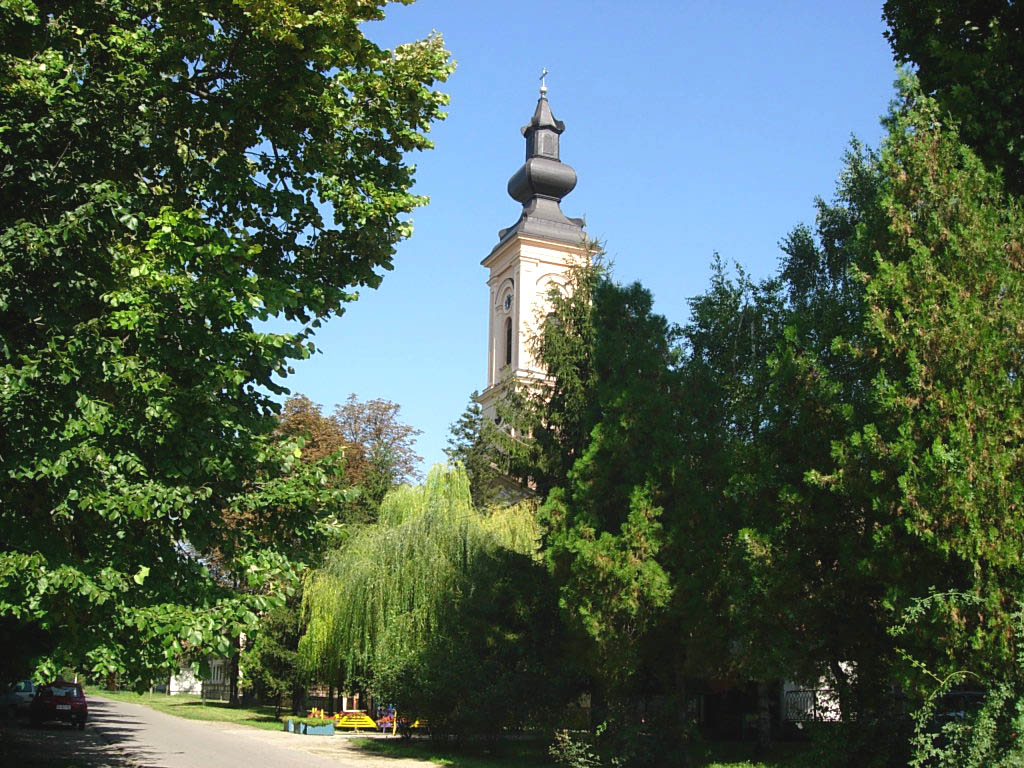
- The Orthodox Church

- Location of Mramorak within Serbia Mramorak (Serbia) Mramorak (Europe)
- Coordinates: 44°52′31″N 20°58′07″E
- Country: Serbia
- Province: Vojvodina
- District: South Banat
- Municipality: Kovin
- Elevation: 109 m (358 ft)

Population (2002)
  - Mramorak: 3,145
- Time zone: UTC+1 (CET)
  - Summer (DST): UTC+2 (CEST)
- Postal code: 26226
- Area code: +381(0)13
- Car plates: KO

Mramorak (Serbian Cyrillic: Мраморак) is a village in Serbia. It is situated in the Kovin municipality, in the South Banat District, Vojvodina province. The village has a Serb ethnic majority (71.79%) with a present Romanian minority (13.22%) and its population numbering 3,145 people (2002 census).

== History ==
Sava Maksimović, Pera Pankeričan, Bogdan Rašić, Jovan Uzelac, Svetozar Nedić, Stanko Manderaš, Dušan Pankeričan, Gordana Stojadinov, Bogoslav Dimitrijev, Stevan Nertica, Veselin Arsenov, Duško Pankeričan, Bora Zeman, Vasa Albu, Savo Rajkov, Branko Novakov, Vitomir Mijuca, Bogoslav Vukonjanski, Jovan Gruja and Jovan Novakov are listed on a plaque in Mramorak as fallen antifascist soldiers in WWII.

== Historical population ==
- 1948: 4,939
- 1953: 5,204
- 1961: 5,113
- 1971: 4,411
- 1981: 3,888
- 1991: 3,597

== Ethnic groups ==
Year	Total	Serbs	Romanians	Romani	Yugoslavs	ethnic Muslims	Hungarians	Montenegrins	Other
1991	3,597	68.97%	14.67%	3.08%	4.36%	3.28%	1.61%	1.36%	2.67%
2002	3,145	71.79%	13.22%	3.21%	1.68%	2.22%	1.62%	0.60%	5.66%

== See also ==
- List of places in Serbia
- List of cities, towns and villages in Vojvodina

http://www.mramorak.de (Danube Swabians in Mramorak)
