= Kovin =

Kovin Ковин (Serbian) Cuvin (Romanian) Kevevára (Hungarian)
- Town and municipality
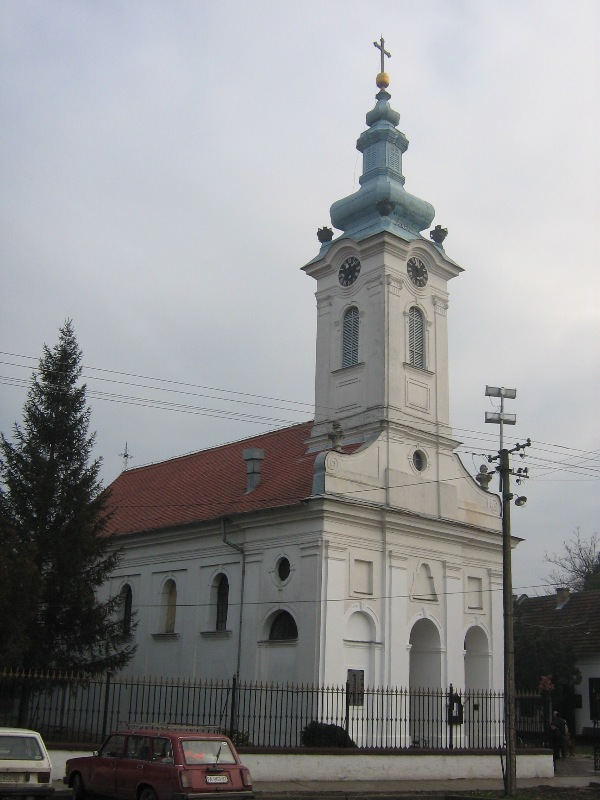
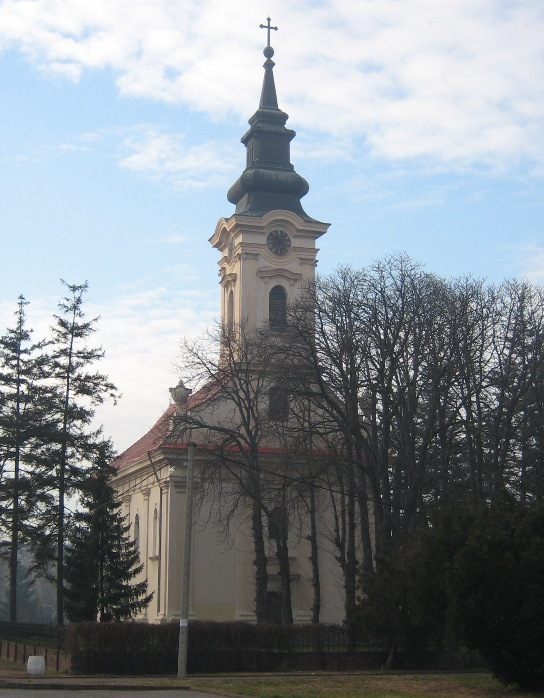
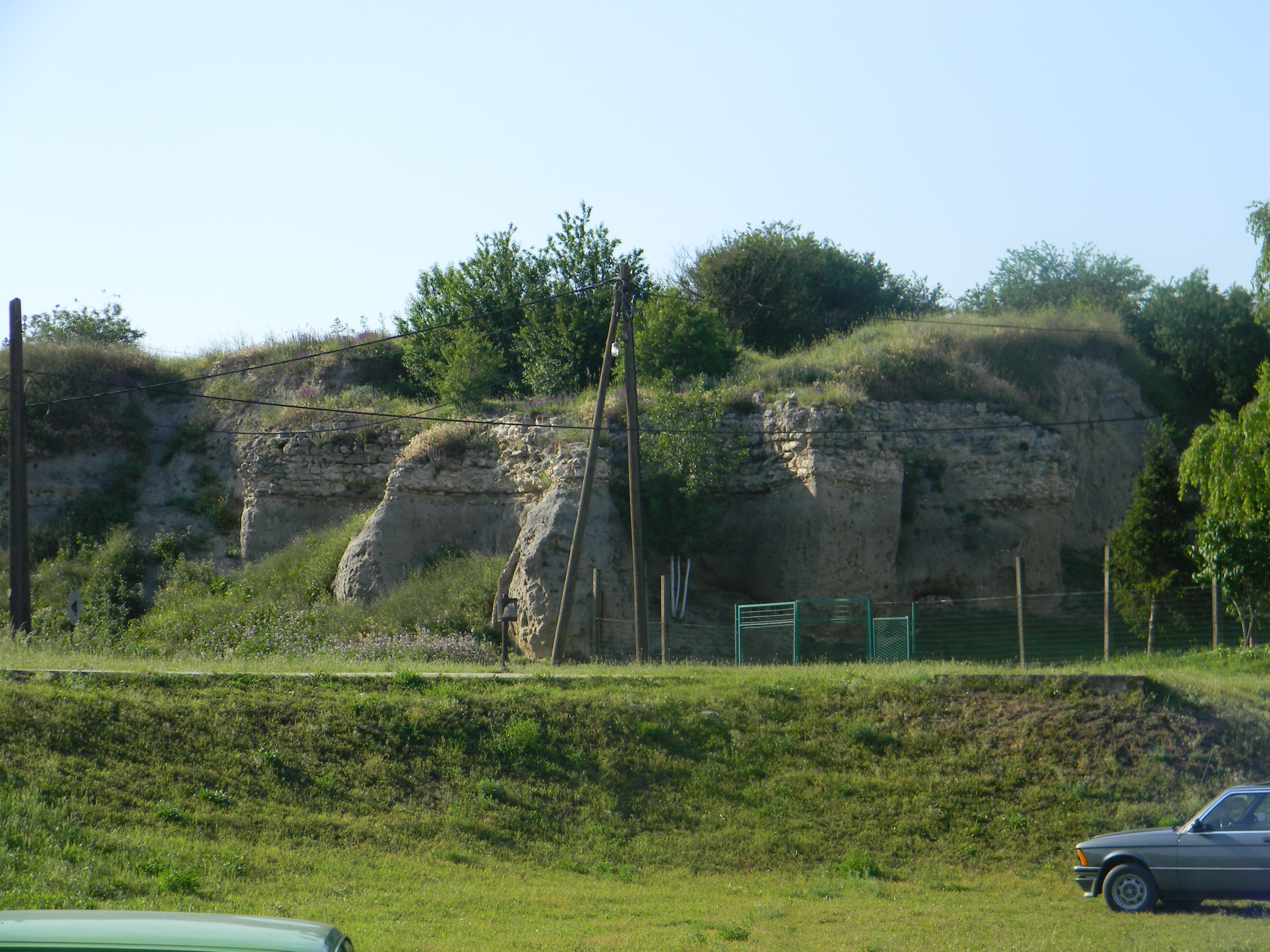
- From top: Serbian Orthodox Church, The Saint Teresa of Avila Catholic Church, Ruins of Kovin fortress

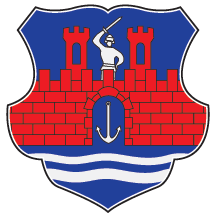
- Coat of arms

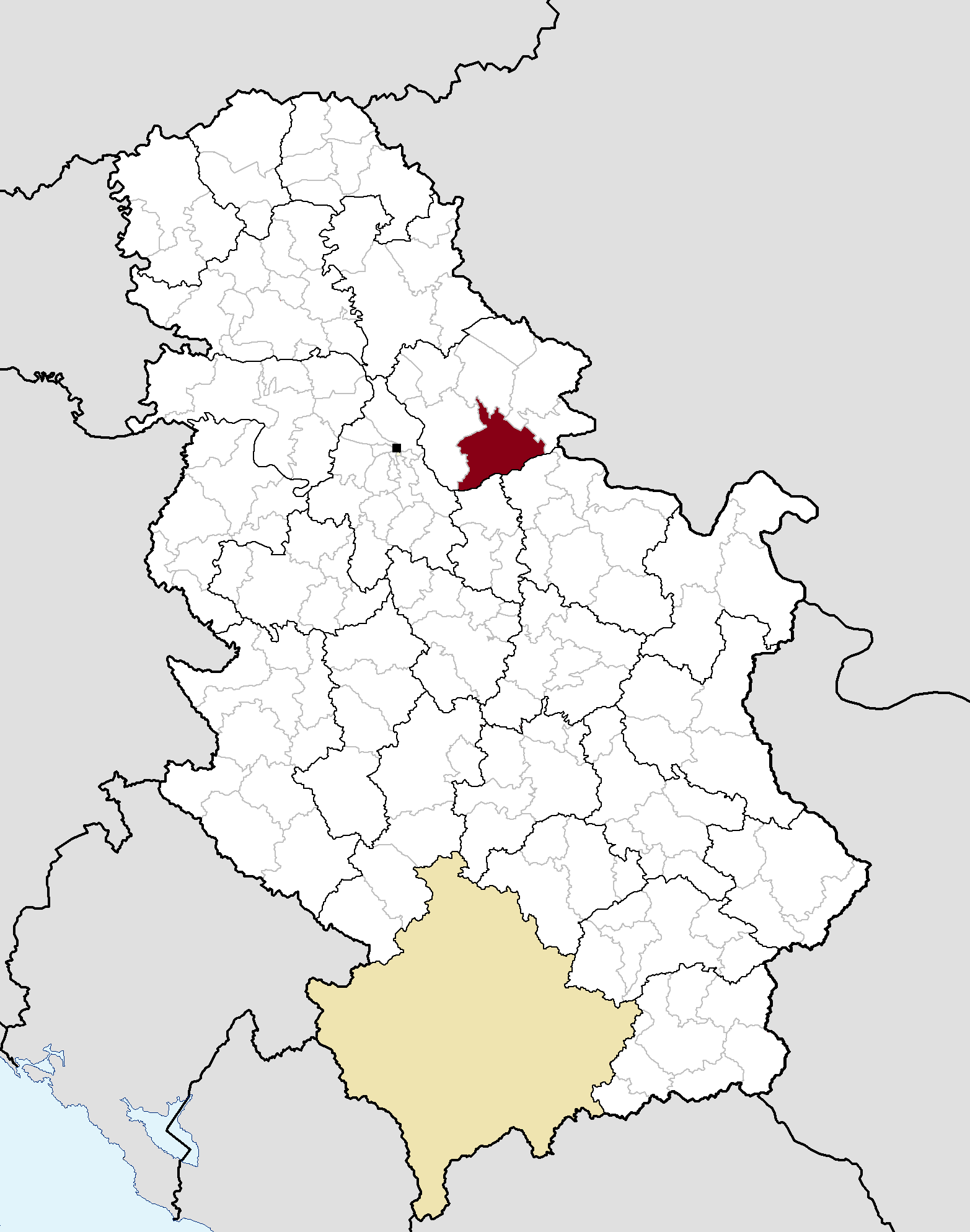
- Location of Kovin within Serbia
- Coordinates: 44°45′N 20°58′E
- Country: Serbia
- Province: Vojvodina
- District: South Banat

Government
  - Mayor: Violeta Ocokoljić (SNS)

Area
  - Town: 96.72 km^{2} (37.34 sq mi)
  - Municipality: 738.30 km^{2} (285.06 sq mi)
- Elevation: 68 m (223 ft)

Population (2022 census)
  - Town: 11,623
  - Town density: 120.2/km^{2} (311.2/sq mi)
  - Municipality: 28,141
  - Municipality density: 38.116/km^{2} (98.720/sq mi)
- Time zone: UTC+1 (CET)
  - Summer (DST): UTC+2 (CEST)
- Postal code: 26220, 26221, 26223
- Area code: +381(0)13
- Car plates: KO
- Official languages: Serbian together with Romanian and Hungarian
- Website: http://www.kovin.org.rs/

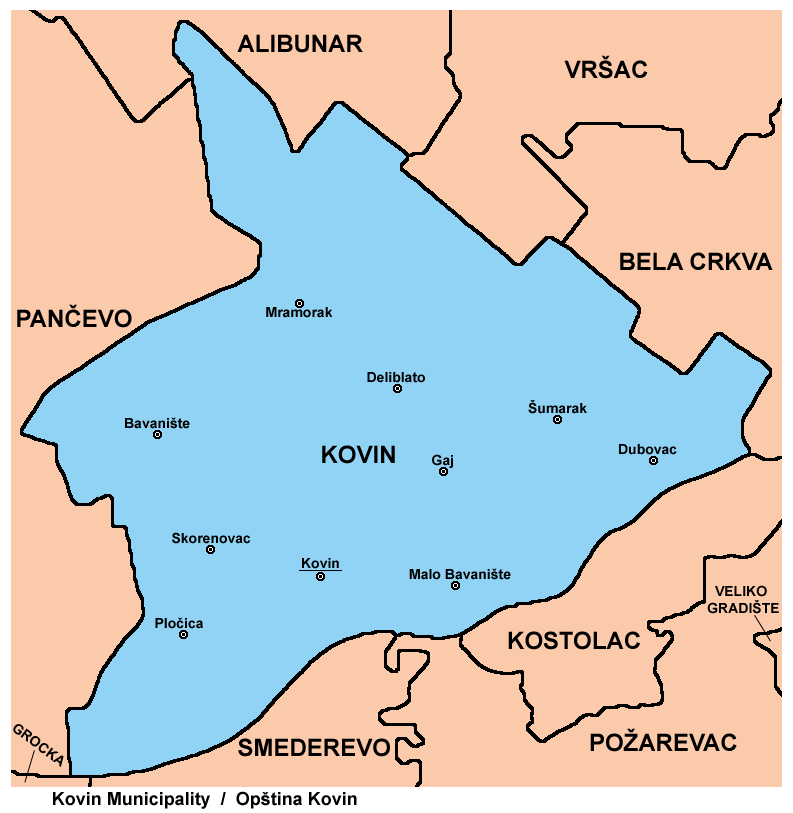
Map of Kovin municipality

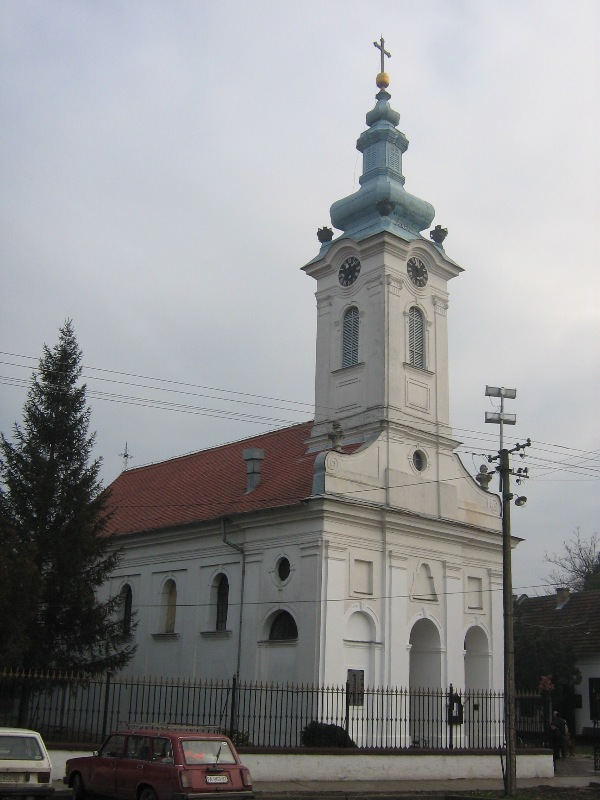
Serbian Orthodox church

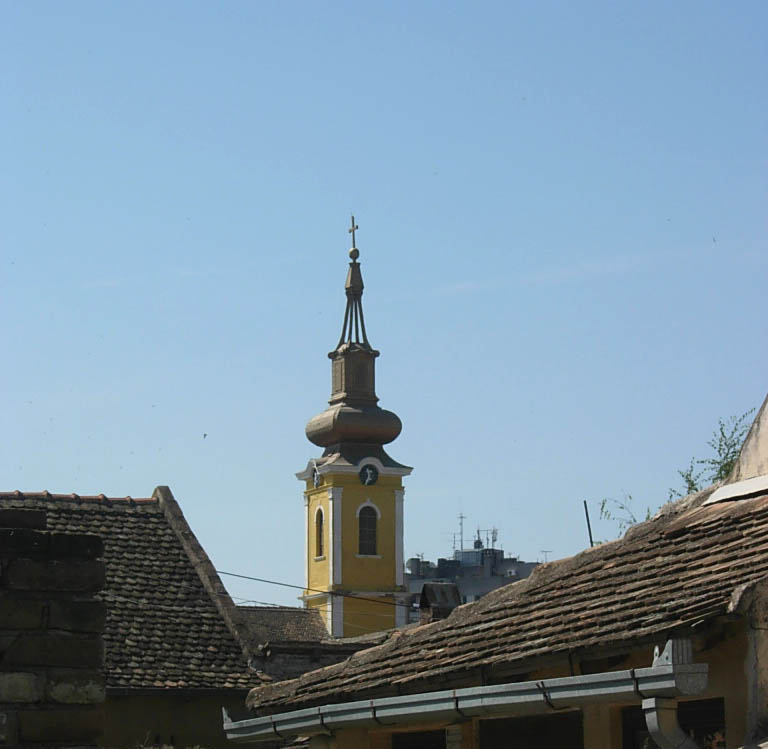
Romanian Orthodox church

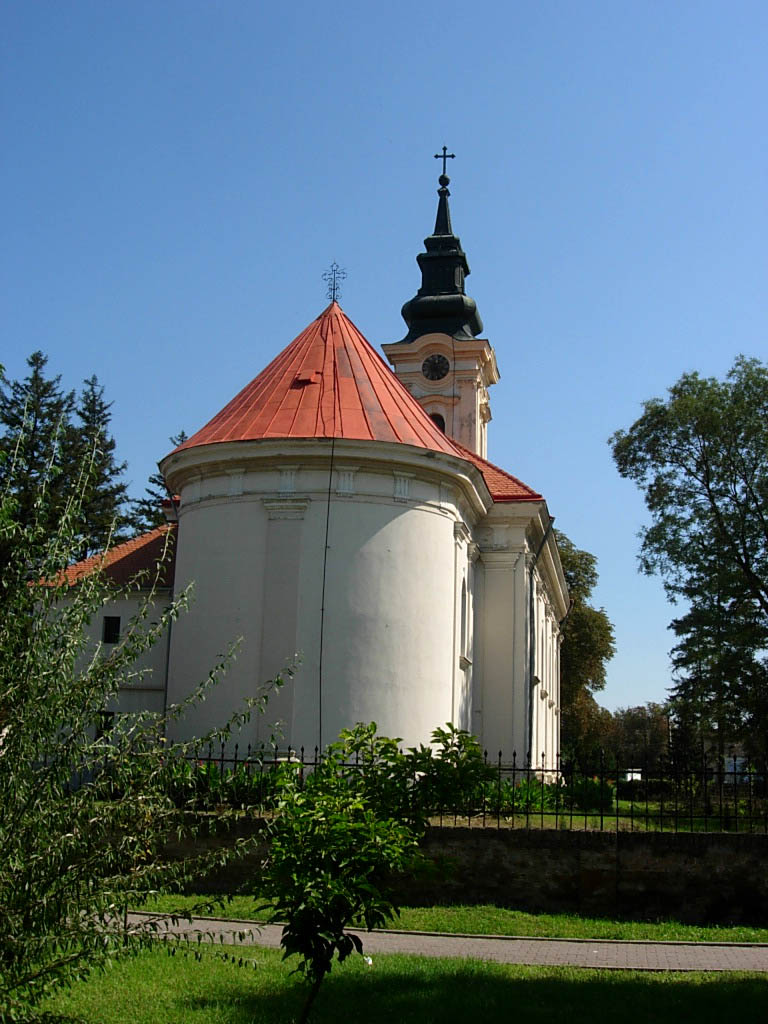
The Saint Teresa of Avila Catholic Church

Kovin (Serbian Cyrillic: Ковин, Hungarian: Kevevára) is a town and municipality located in the South Banat District of the autonomous province of Vojvodina, Serbia. The town has a population of 11,623, while the municipality has 28,141 inhabitants (2022 census).

== Other names ==
In Romanian, the town is known as Cuvin, in Hungarian as Kevevára or (until 1899) Temeskubin, and in German as Kubin or Temeschkubin. In the past, the town was also known as Donji Kovin ("Lower Kovin") in contrast to the town with same name in Hungary that was known in Serbian as Gornji Kovin ("Upper Kovin") and in Hungarian as Ráckeve ("the Serb Kovin").

== History ==
The Dacian tribe of Albocenses dwelled in this area in the second century AD. There are remains of the ancient Roman fortress called Contra Margum, opposite to the Margum, a fortress on the other side of the Danube. In the ninth and tenth centuries, this area was populated by Slavs and Romanians and Voivode Glad ruled over the region. Glad was defeated by the Hungarians, and the area was included into the medieval Kingdom of Hungary. In the 11th century, one of the descendants of Glad, Ahtum, ruled over the region but he, too, was defeated by the Hungarians.

The earliest mention of the settlement was in 1071 as Keuee. Kovin is mentioned in the 12th century as a seat of the county, which included most of the western Banat. Since the 14th century, the city has had a large Serb population that escaped there from Serbia under threat by the Ottomans. The Serbian despot Lazar Branković took control over the city in 1457, but in the next year it came again under control of the Kingdom of Hungary.

In the 16th century, the city was included in the Ottoman Empire and became a part of the Ottoman Province of Temeşvar. During the Ottoman rule (16th-17th century), Kovin was mostly populated by ethnic Serbs. In 1716, it became part of the Habsburg monarchy and belonged to the Habsburg Banat of Temeswar until 1751 when it became part of the Habsburg Military Frontier (Banat Krajina).

In 1848/1849, Kovin was part of the Serbian Voivodship, but in 1849 it was again placed under administration of the Military Frontier. With the abolishment of the Military Frontier in 1873, Kovin was incorporated into Temes county within the Kingdom of Hungary. According to the 1910 census, Kovin District had a population of 35,482, of whom 21,795 spoke Serbian, 6,587 German, 5,705 Romanian, and 5,355 Hungarian.

This town had a significant role in the outbreak of World War I. In July 1914, a purported military skirmish here was a proximate cause of the declaration of war against Serbia by Franz Joseph I of Austria, but the report of such skirmish was apparently false, or greatly exaggerated.

In 1918, Kovin became part of the Kingdom of Serbs, Croats and Slovenes (renamed to Yugoslavia in 1929). Between 1918 and 1922, it was part of Banat county; between 1922 and 1929 part of the Podunavska oblast; and between 1929 and 1941 part of the Danube Banovina. Between 1941 and 1944, Kovin was under Axis occupation and was part of the autonomous Banat region within German-occupied Serbia. The town was heavily bombed by the Allies in 1944. In 1945, it became part of the Socialist Autonomous Province of Vojvodina within the Socialist Republic of Serbia and the Socialist Federal Republic of Yugoslavia. In 1992, Kovin became part of the Federal Republic of Yugoslavia, which was in 2003 transformed into the state union of Serbia and Montenegro. Since 2006, the town is part of an independent Serbia.

== Inhabited places ==
Kovin municipality includes the town of Kovin and the following villages:

- Bavanište
- Gaj
- Deliblato
- Dubovac
- Malo Bavanište
- Mramorak
- Pločica
- Skorenovac (Hungarian: Székelykeve)
- Šumarak

There is also this unofficial settlement in municipality:

- Čardak

== Demographics ==
Historical population
Year	Pop.	±% p.a.
1948	35,465	—
1953	38,061	+1.42%
1961	39,994	+0.62%
1971	39,808	−0.05%
1981	39,843	+0.01%
1991	38,263	−0.40%
2002	36,802	−0.35%
2011	33,722	−0.97%
2022	28,141	−1.63%

According to the 2011 census, the total population of the municipality of Kovin was 33,722 inhabitants.

=== Ethnic groups ===
Municipality

Year	Population	Serbs	Germans	Romanians	Hungarians	Croats	Romani	Slovaks	Rest
1910	34,034	45.52%	19.30%	16.65%	15.64%	0.09%	1.28%	0.12%	1.70%
1931	35,600	50.66%	20.68%	n/d	13.0%	n/d	n/d	n/d	15.64%
1961	39,994	73.1%	n/d	17.6%	13.59%	n/d	0.04%	0.14%	5.27%
1991	38,263	73.53%	0.20%	4.54%	10.28%	0.39%	2.47%	0.05%	8.54%
2002	36,802	76.75%	0.13%	3.7%	9.26%	0.3%	3.1%	0.11%	7.44%
2011	33,722	74.58%	0.14%	3.47%	8.90%	0.19%	4.5%	0.04%	8.18%

Settlements with a Serb ethnic majority are: Kovin, Bavanište, Gaj, Deliblato, Dubovac, Malo Bavanište, Mramorak, and Pločica. Skorenovac has a Hungarian ethnic majority. Šumarak is an ethnically mixed settlement with a relative Hungarian majority.

Town

Year	Total	Serbs	Hungarians	Romanians	Romani	Montenegrins	Yugoslavs	Macedonians	Rest
1991	13,669	76.19%	6.78%	3.47%	1.40%	1.67%	6.81%	0.76%	2.21%
2002	14,250	80.79%	5.51%	2.93%	2.00%	0.92%	1.26%	0.50%	6.09%
2011	13,515	79.22%	5.18%	2.60%	2.40%	0.50%	0.43%	0.50%	9.17%

== Economy ==
The following table gives a preview of total number of registered people employed in legal entities per their core activity (as of 2018):

Activity	Total
Agriculture, forestry and fishing	557
Mining and quarrying	114
Manufacturing	1,372
Electricity, gas, steam and air conditioning supply	50
Water supply; sewerage, waste management and remediation activities	113
Construction	325
Wholesale and retail trade, repair of motor vehicles and motorcycles	824
Transportation and storage	214
Accommodation and food services	173
Information and communication	49
Financial and insurance activities	57
Real estate activities	9
Professional, scientific and technical activities	174
Administrative and support service activities	187
Public administration and defense; compulsory social security	291
Education	408
Human health and social work activities	755
Arts, entertainment and recreation	64
Other service activities	103
Individual agricultural workers	570
Total	6,411

== Sports ==
Local football club Radnički (Workers) have competed in the third tier of Serbian football.

== Twin cities ==
- Ráckeve, Hungary

== See also ==
- List of places in Serbia
- Municipalities of Serbia
- South Banat District
