= Dubovac, Kovin =

Dubovac Дубовац
- Village (Selo)
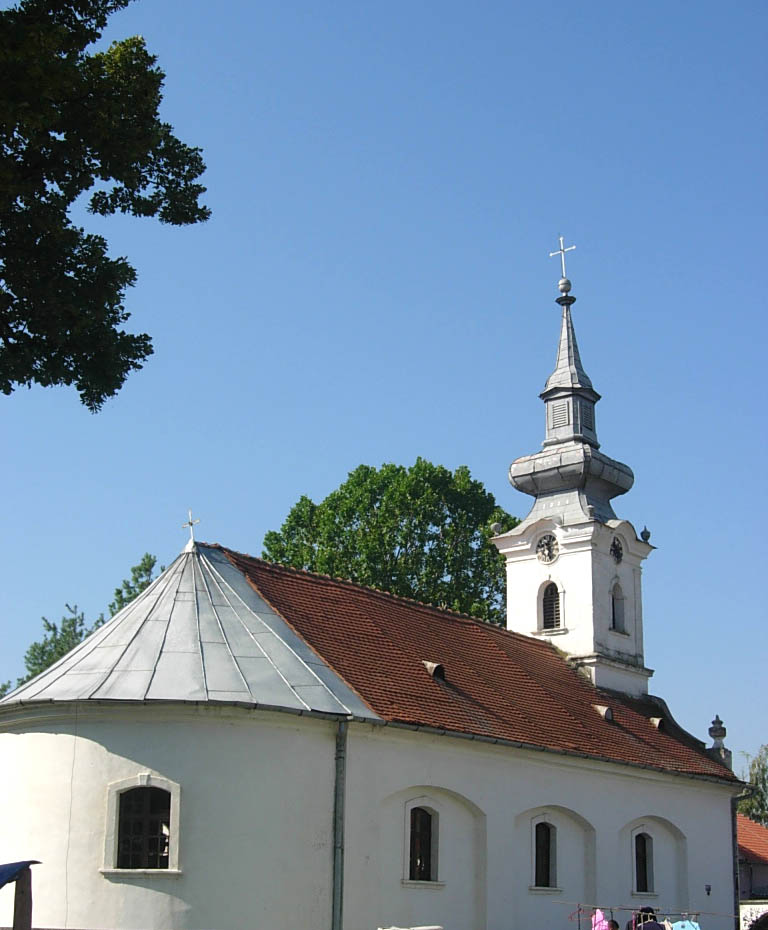
- The Orthodox Church

- Location of Dubovac within Serbia Dubovac (Serbia) Dubovac (Europe)
- Coordinates: 44°47′26″N 21°12′16″E
- Country: Serbia
- Province: Vojvodina
- District: South Banat
- Municipality: Kovin
- Elevation: 59 m (194 ft)

Population (2002)
  - Dubovac: 1,283
- Time zone: UTC+1 (CET)
  - Summer (DST): UTC+2 (CEST)
- Postal code: 26224
- Area code: +381(0)13
- Car plates: KO

Dubovac (Serbian Cyrillic: Дубовац) is a village in Serbia. It is situated in the Kovin municipality, in the South Banat District, Vojvodina province. The village has a Serb ethnic majority (84.02%) and its population numbering 1,283 people (2002 census).

== Geography ==
Dubovac stretches along the Danube River.

== Name ==
In Serbian, the village is known as Дубовац or Dubovac, in Hungarian as Dunadombó, in German as Dubowatz, in Croatian as Dubovac.

== History ==
The old village known as Stari Dubovac (Old Dubovac) was situated closer to the Danube river.

== Population ==
Historical population
Year	1961	1971	1981	1991	2002
Population	1,677	1,675	1,598	1,469	1,283

Major ethnic groups
Year	Total	Serbs	Romani	Hungarians	Yugoslavs	Romanians	Germans	Macedonians	Others
1991	1,469	87.54%	4.08%	2.04%	0.88%	3.40%	0.20%	0.34%	0.84%
2002	1,283	84.02%	8.65%	2.18%	1.09%	1.48%	0.54%	0.23%	1.81%

== See also ==
- List of places in Serbia
- List of cities, towns and villages in Vojvodina
