= Church of the Nativity of Saint John the Baptist, Mladenovo =

Church of the Nativity of Saint John the Baptist
- Crkva svetog Ivana Krstitelja
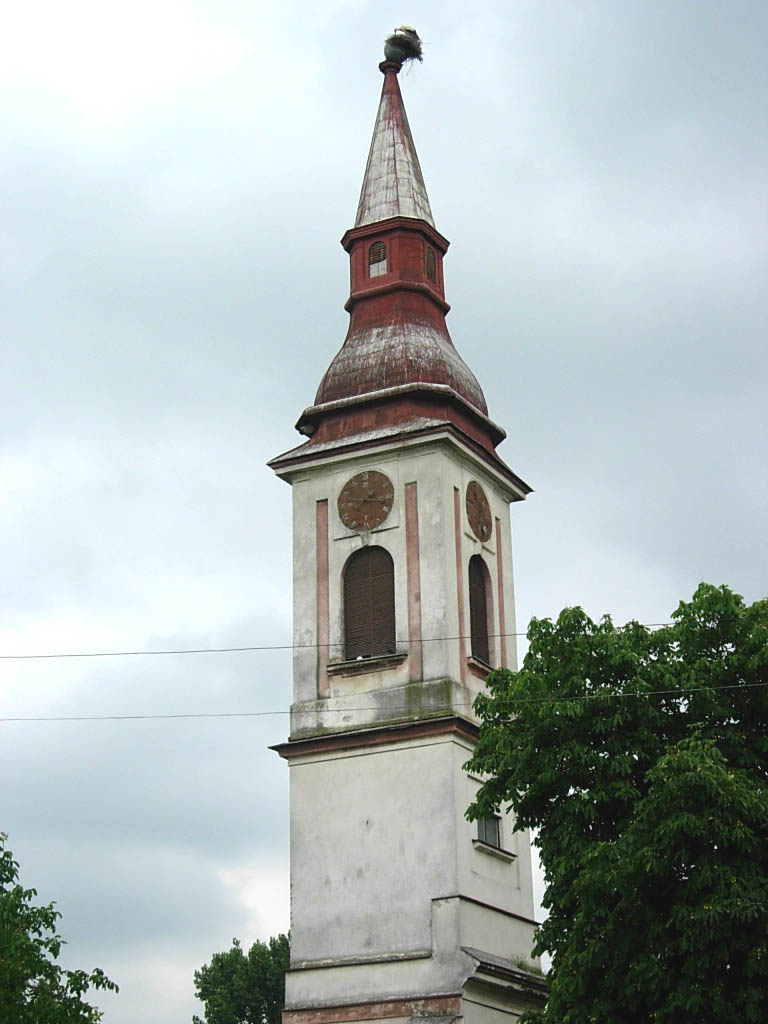
- Church of the Nativity of Saint John the Baptist
- Church of the Nativity of Saint John the Baptist
- 45°18′16″N 19°15′41″E
- Location: Mladenovo, Vojvodina
- Country: Serbia
- Denomination: Roman Catholic

History
- Dedication: Saint John the Baptist

Architecture
- Style: Neoclassicism
- Years built: 1812

Administration
- Archdiocese: Roman Catholic Diocese of Subotica

Church of the Nativity of Saint John the Baptist (Serbo-Croatian: Crkva svetog Ivana Krstitelja) is a Roman Catholic Parish church in Mladenovo in Vojvodina, Serbia. The church was constructed in 1812. The earliest preserved mention of the local Roman Catholic parish in the village is mentioned in 1332 and it 1731 it was a branch of the nearby Church of Saint Anne in Bačko Novo Selo. The church building was expanded in 1934.
