= Bodani =

Bodani may refer to:

- The city Bođani in Serbia
- The town of Rewas - Bodani in Maharashtra, India
