= Josip Leko =

Croatian politician

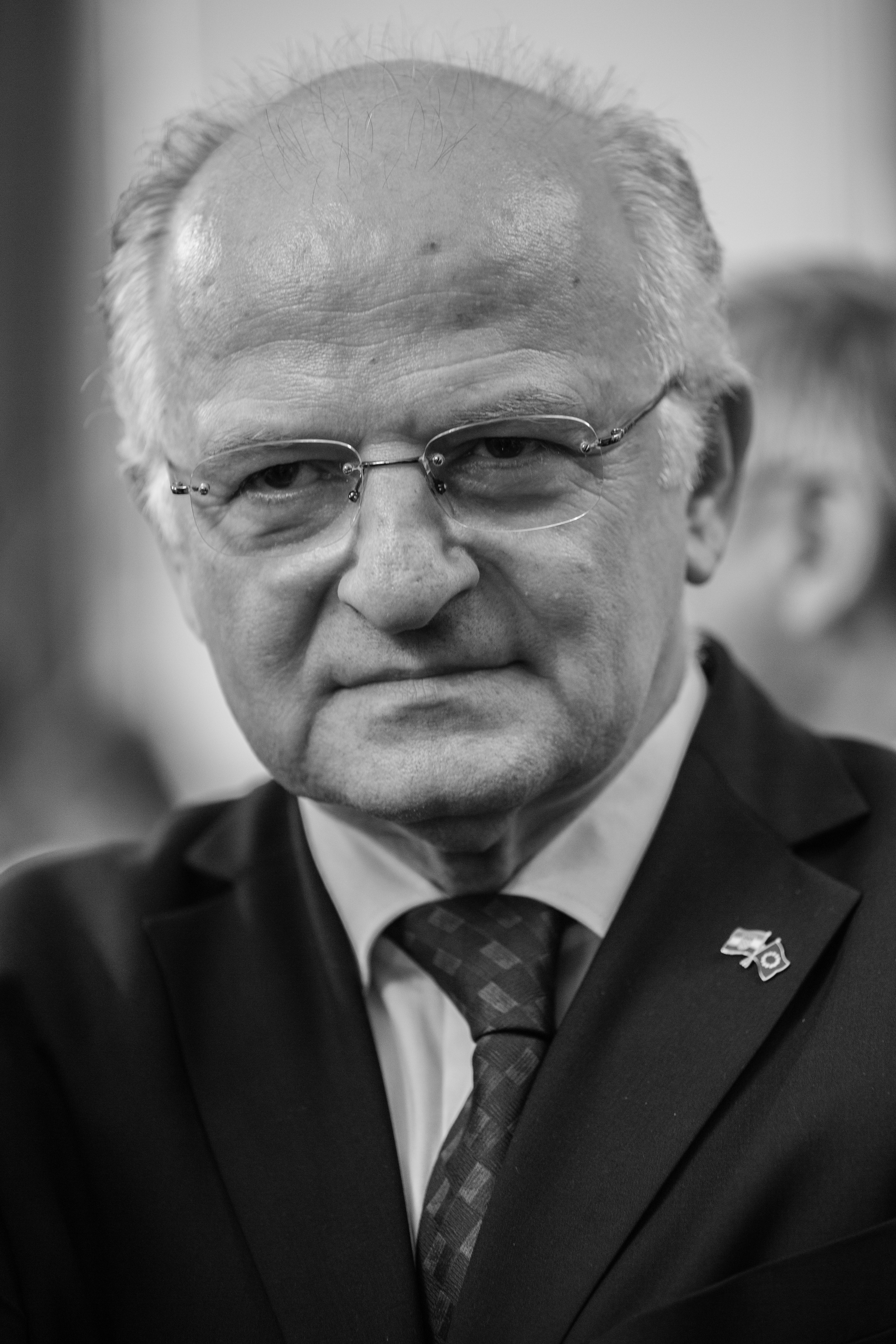
- Leko in 2013

Justice of the Constitutional Court of Croatia
- In office 7 June 2016 – 7 December 2024

Speaker of the Croatian Parliament
- In office 30 September 2012 – 28 December 2015; Acting: 30 September 2012 – 10 October 2012
- Preceded by: Boris Šprem
- Succeeded by: Željko Reiner

Personal details
- Born: 19 September 1948 (age 78) Plavna, PR Serbia, FPR Yugoslavia (modern Serbia)
- Party: SDP
- Education: University of Zagreb
- Profession: Law

Josip Leko (born 19 September 1948) is a Croatian politician who served as Speaker of the Croatian Parliament from 2012 to 2015.

== Biography ==
He was born in 1948 in Plavna village (Bač municipality) in Bačka, Serbia (then Yugoslavia) to a Croatian family from Ledinac near Grude in western Herzegovina. When he was one and a half years old the family returned to Herzegovina.

He finished high school in Herzegovina and went to university in Zagreb, Croatia where he got a major in law.

On 19 June 2012 he became a president of the Executive Council of the Social Democratic Party of Croatia.

When in 2013 he became the Speaker of the Parliament he became the first Croat from Herzegovina to hold such a high position in Croatian politics.

== Career ==
Leko was deputy speaker from 23 December 2011 to 30 September 2012, when he succeeded Boris Šprem, who died in office, as interim speaker. He had already been acting as speaker during Šprem's absence due to cancer treatment in Houston, Texas. He was proposed as the permanent Speaker of the Parliament by the ruling coalition and was confirmed on 10 October 2012, by a vote of 123 parliamentarians out of 151.

On 3 June 2016, Croatian Parliament appointed him as a justice of the Constitutional Court of Croatia and he took his position on 7 June.
