= Boris Šprem =

Croatian politician

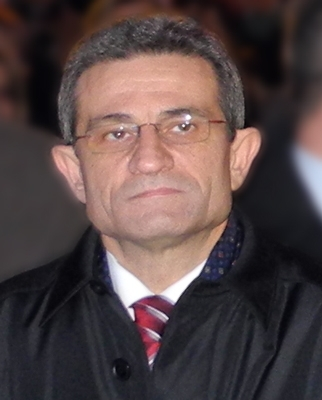
- Šprem in 2012

Speaker of the Croatian Parliament
- In office 22 December 2011 – 30 September 2012
- Preceded by: Luka Bebić
- Succeeded by: Josip Leko

Chief of Staff of the Office of the President of Croatia
- In office 1 October 2005 – 2007
- President: Stjepan Mesić
- Preceded by: Davor Božinović
- Succeeded by: Amir Muharemi

Personal details
- Born: 14 April 1956 Koprivnički Bregi, PR Croatia, FPR Yugoslavia (modern Croatia)
- Died: 30 September 2012 (aged 56) Houston, Texas, United States
- Resting place: Mirogoj Cemetery, Zagreb, Croatia
- Party: SDP
- Education: University of Zagreb
- Profession: Lawyer

Boris Šprem (14 April 1956 – 30 September 2012) was a Croatian politician who was the speaker of the Croatian Parliament from 2011 to 2012. He was the first and to date only speaker to die in office since country's independence in 1991.

== Early life and education ==
Šprem was born in Koprivnica, Croatia (then Yugoslavia), on 14 April 1956. He studied law at the University of Zagreb.

== Political career ==
Šprem served as Chief of Staff of the Office of the President of the Republic from 2005 to 2007, during the second term of Stjepan Mesić, and he was the Speaker of the Croatian Parliament from 2011 to 2012. Šprem also served as the president of the city council of Zagreb and was a member of parliament of Social Democratic Party (SDP). His term as Speaker began on 22 December 2011 after SDP won the 2011 general election.

== Death and funeral ==
Šprem was first diagnosed with cancer in 2010. In June 2012, Šprem underwent surgery at the Zagreb Clinical Centre due to the recurrence of multiple myeloma lesions. He went to Houston for further treatment on 23 August 2012.

He died on 30 September 2012 at MD Anderson Cancer Center in Houston, Texas, U.S., where he had been undergoing treatment for multiple myeloma. He is the first Speaker of the Croatian Parliament to die in office. He was succeeded in an acting capacity by his deputy Josip Leko, who had been acting Speaker since Šprem left for the U.S. in 2012. Leko was later also elected as the 9th Speaker of Parliament, on 10 October 2012.

Šprem's remains arrived in Zagreb on a regular flight from Frankfurt, Germany, on 3 October. On 4 October, the mourning began with a ceremonial session of the Parliament, with Šprem's family, as well as former Prime Ministers, Ministers, Parliament members and key religious figures attending. Prime Minister Zoran Milanović and Šprem's mother, son and wife then went to Mirogoj Cemetery, as part of a procession, where the last respects were paid. A gun salute was then given by members of the Croatian Armed Forces.

Although he was an atheist during the most of his life, during his sickness he turned into religious Christian. He requested last rite and to be buried with Catholic rite. Boris Šprem was posthumously honoured with the Grand Order of Queen Jelena with Sash and Morning Star medal (Croatian: Velered kraljice Jelene s lentom i danicom) by the President of Croatia Ivo Josipović.

== Reactions ==
A day of national mourning was declared following the death of Šprem in Croatia. On 1 October 2012, European Parliament President Martin Schulz issued a statement on Šprem's death, sending his condolences to his family, friends and the Croatian nation.
