= Bačko Novo Selo =

Bačko Novo Selo Бачко Ново Село (Serbian)
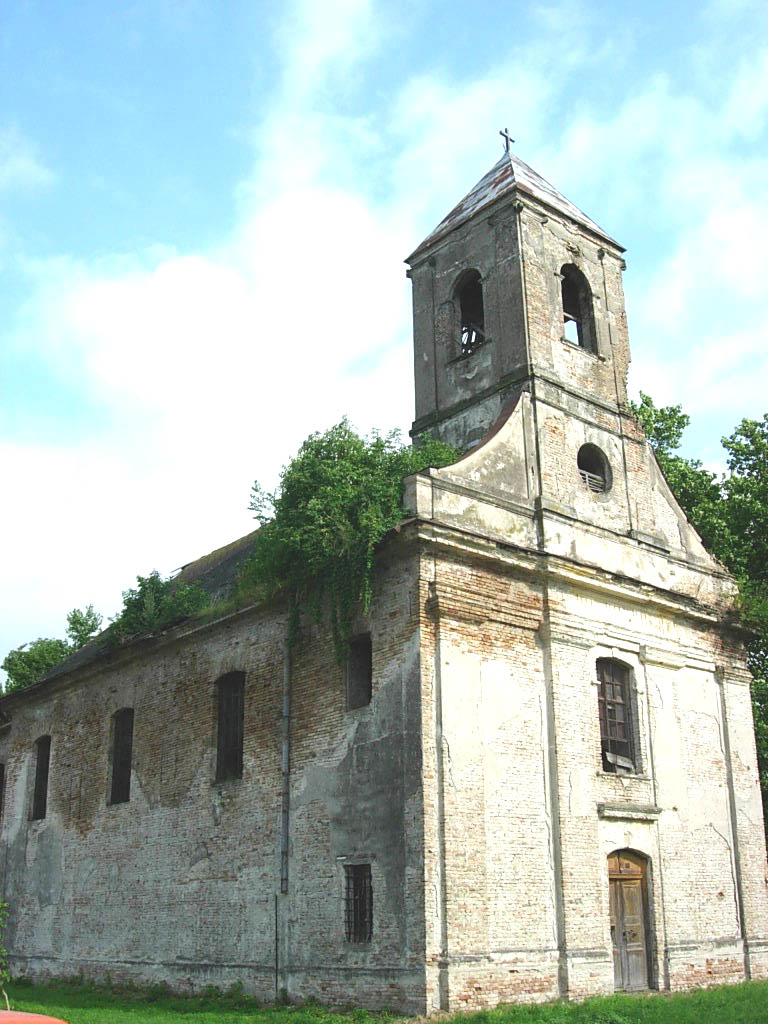
- The Saint Ana Catholic Church

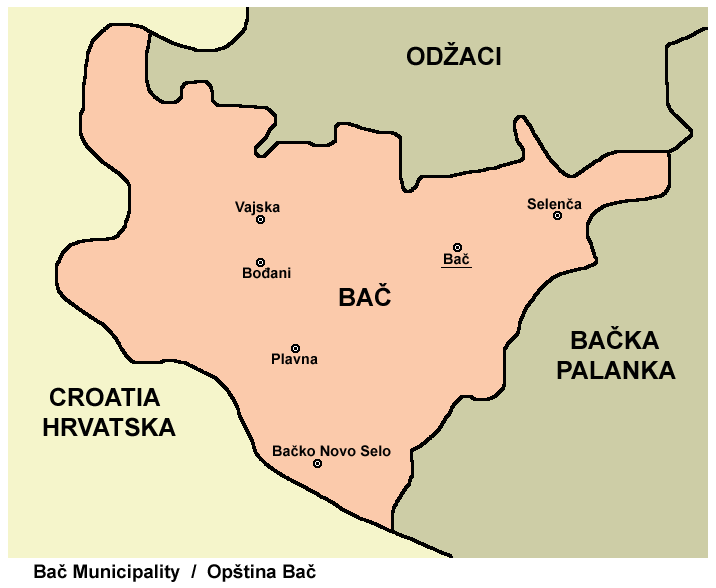
- Map of the Bač municipality showing the location of Bačko Novo Selo

- Location within Vojvodina Location within Serbia Location within Europe
- Coordinates: 45°18′N 19°08′E
- Country: Serbia
- Province: Vojvodina
- Region: Bačka (Podunavlje)
- District: South Bačka
- Municipality: Bač

Population (2002)
  - Total: 1,228
- Time zone: UTC+1 (CET)
  - Summer (DST): UTC+2 (CEST)

Bačko Novo Selo (Serbian Cyrillic: Бачко Ново Село) is a village in Serbia. It is situated in the Bač municipality, South Bačka District, Vojvodina province. The village has a Serb ethnic majority and a Bosniak minority. Its population numbering 1,228 people (2002 census). The village was formally known as Batsch Neudorf prior to World War Two. The etymology of the village comes from Slavic languages meaning new village, Novo Selo and Bačko from the region it’s in Bačka.

== History ==
Bačko Novo Selo was historically populated by Danube Swabians. Following the end of the Second World War, the Yugoslav Communist authorities displaced the German population of the village and resettled families from Bosnia. The Yugoslav Communist authorities aimed to develop Bačko Novo Selo into a Muslim colony of Vojvodina, however, by the spring of 1947, only an estimated 138 out of an expected 320 Muslim families settled in Bačko Novo Selo.

== Geography ==
Neighbouring places are Plavna and Mladenovo (both located in Bačka), as well as Sotin and Opatovac, which are situated across the Danube in the Croatian part of Syrmia.

== Historical population ==
- 1961: 2,236
- 1971: 1,665
- 1981: 1,522
- 1991: 1,365

== Famous residents ==
- Refik Memišević, wrestle champion, born in 1956 in Bačko Novo Selo
- Refik Kozić, footballer, born in 1950 in Bačko Novo Selo

== See also ==
- List of places in Serbia
- List of cities, towns and villages in Vojvodina
