= Vajska =

Vajska Вајска (Serbian) Vajszka (Hungarian) Vajska (Slovak) Vajska (Romani)
- Village (Selo)
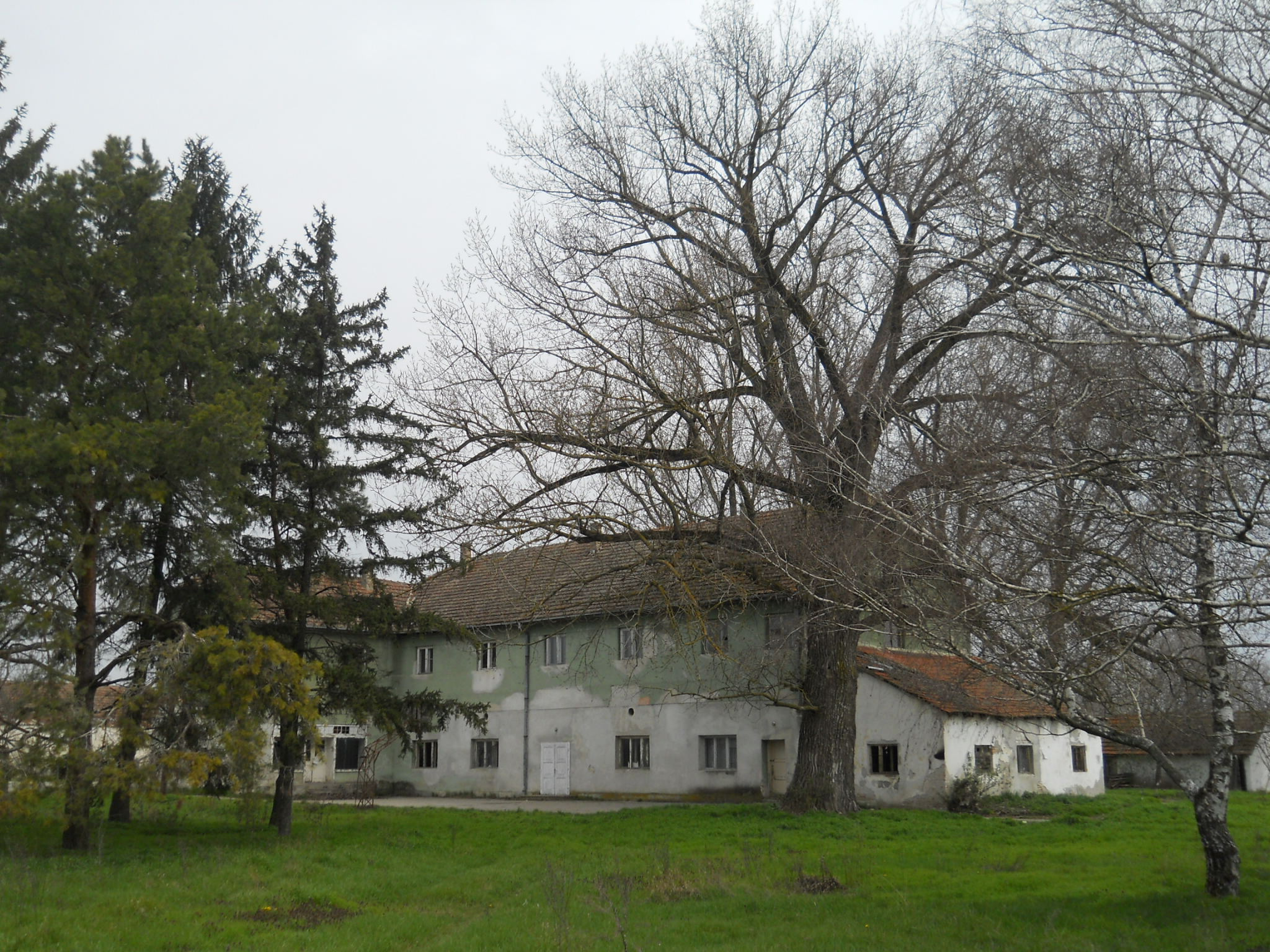
- Labudnjača

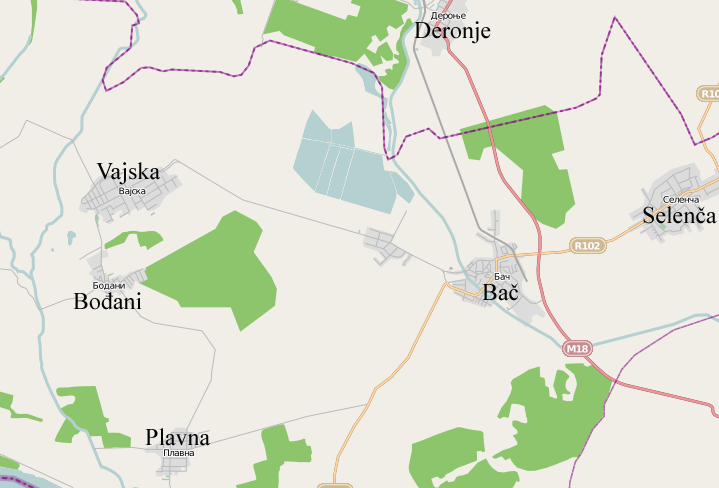
- Map of Vajska and other settlements in the neighborhood

- Location within Vojvodina Location within Serbia Location within Europe
- Coordinates: 45°25′N 19°07′E
- Country: Serbia
- Province: Vojvodina
- Region: Bačka (Podunavlje)
- District: South Bačka
- Municipality: Bač

Population (2011)
  - Total: 2,834
- Time zone: UTC+1 (CET)
  - Summer (DST): UTC+2 (CEST)

Vajska (Serbian Cyrillic: Вајска; Romanian: Vaisca) is a village in Serbia. It is situated in the Bač municipality, in the South Bačka District, Vojvodina province. Two neighbouring settlements, Labudnjača (Serbian Cyrillic: Лабудњача; 45°27′N 19°02′E) and Živa, are also officially regarded as parts of Vajska although they are physically separated from it. The name Labudnjača is derived from Serbian labud 'swan'.

== Name ==
In Serbian the village is known as Vajska (Вајска), in Croatian as Vajska, in Hungarian as Vajszka or Józsefháza, in German as Wajska and in Romanian as Vaisca.

== History ==
During the early stage of the Yugoslav Wars and following the Battle of Borovo Selo in neighbouring Croatia, Danube river link was established between Vajska and Borovo 4 of May 1991 which during its operation reportedly served between 10-30,000 passengers including Croat refugees leaving the village of Borovo.

== Demographics ==
The population of the village numbered 2,834 people as of the 2011 census. In 2002, the population included 1,319 Serbs, 569 Romanians, 353 Croats, 341 Hungarians, 207 Yugoslavs, and others.

== Historical population ==
- 1961: 4,355
- 1971: 3,798
- 1981: 3,448
- 1991: 3,272
- 2002: 3,169

== Gallery ==
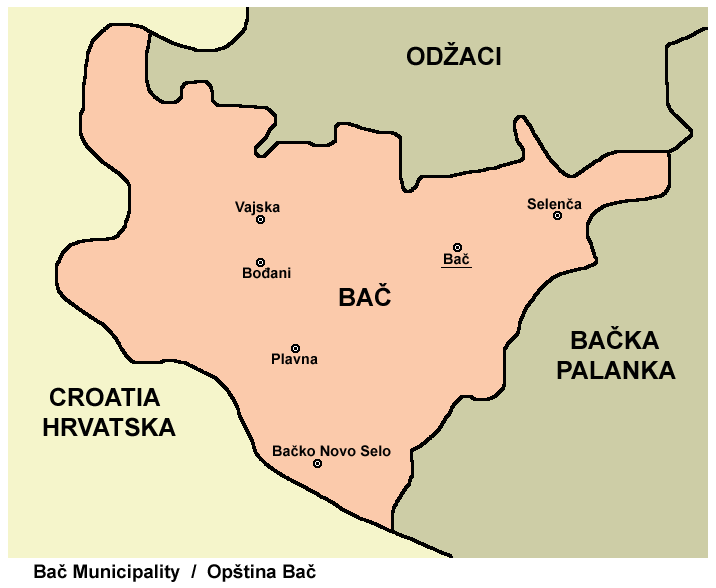
Map of the Bač municipality showing the location of Vajska.

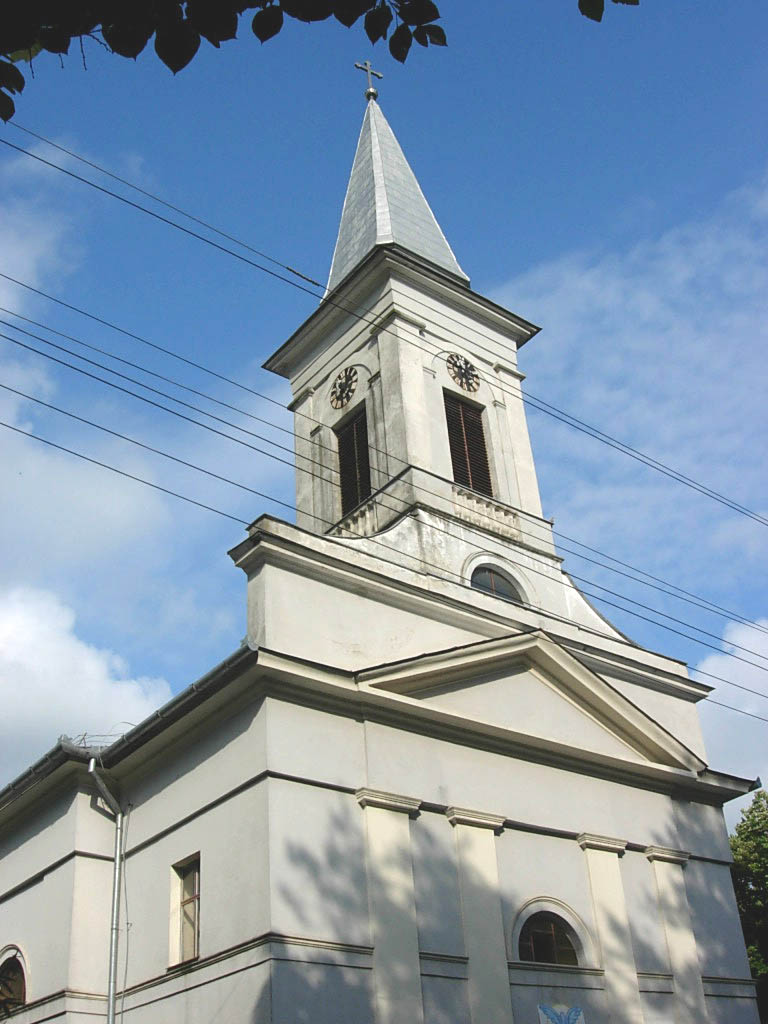
Saint George the Martyr Catholic church.

== See also ==
- List of places in Serbia
- List of cities, towns and villages in Vojvodina
