= Mali Bač =

Coordinates: 45°24′N 19°12′E

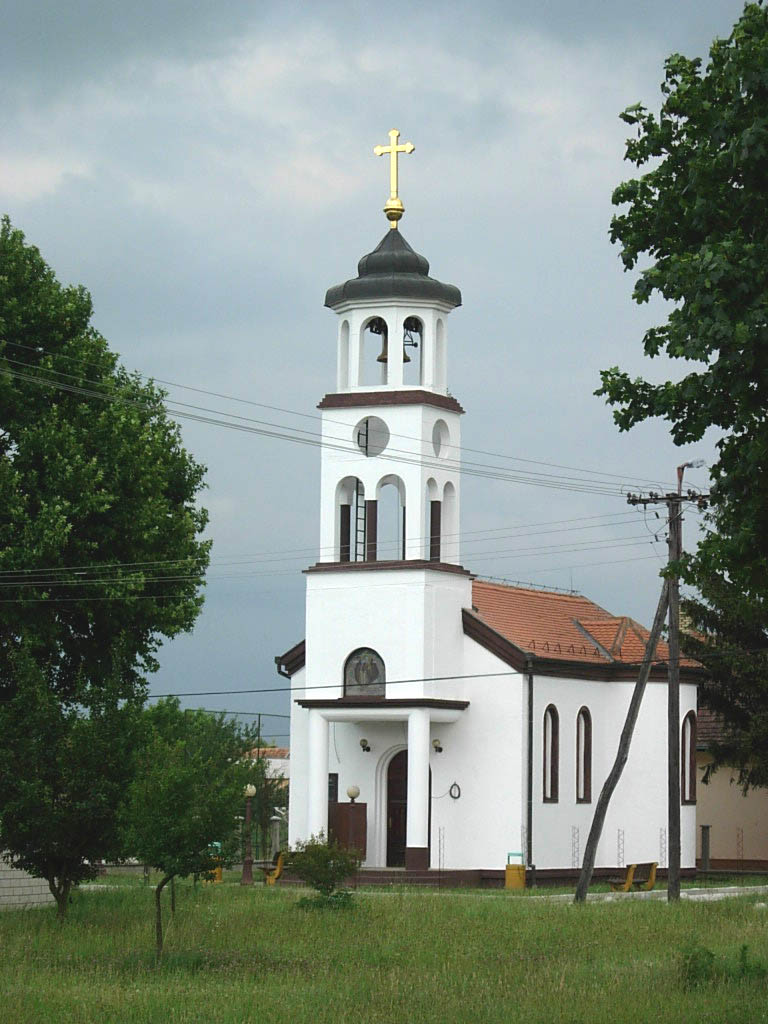
The new Orthodox Church in Mali Bač

Mali Bač (Serbian Cyrillic: Мали Бач) is a small settlement near Bač, Serbia. Although it is physically separated from the Bač town, Mali Bač is not officially regarded as a separate settlement, but as part of Bač. Its name means "little Bač" in Serbian.

== See also ==
- List of places in Serbia
- List of cities, towns and villages in Vojvodina
