= Bođani Monastery =

Monastery in Serbia

Bođani
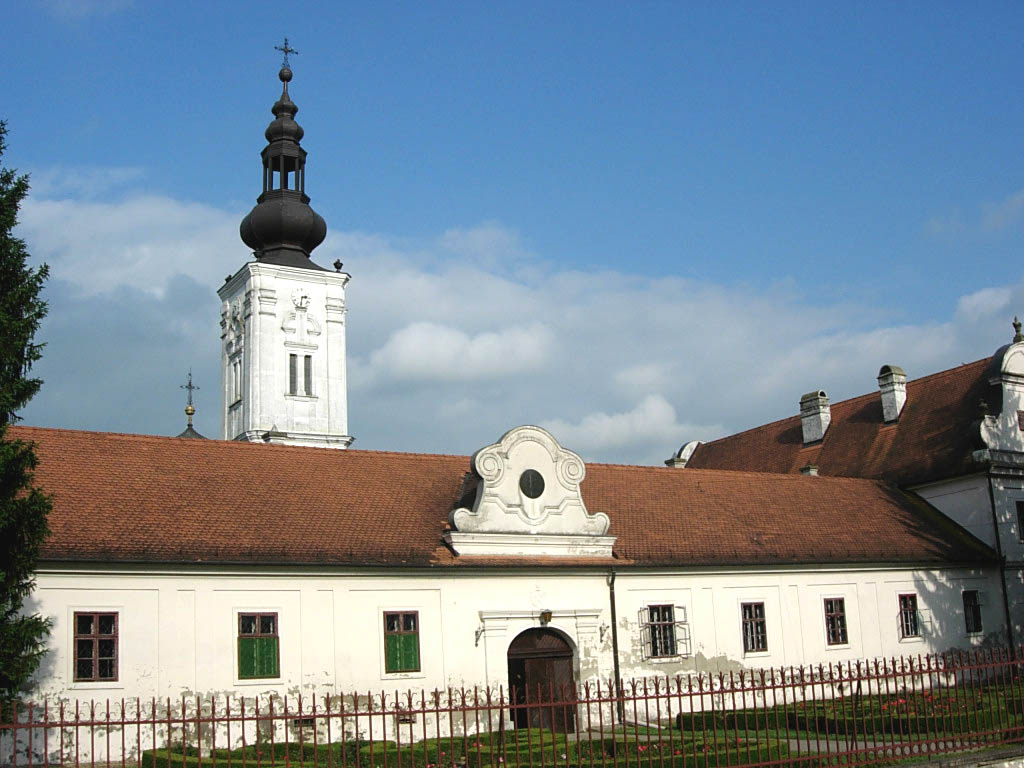
- Bođani Monastery
- Interactive map of Bođani

Monastery information
- Full name: Манастир Бођани
- Order: Serbian Orthodox
- Established: 1478
- Dedication: Presentation of the Blessed Virgin Mary
- Diocese: Eparchy of Bačka
- Controlled churches: 1

People
- Founder: Bogdan from Dalmatia

Site
- Location: Bođani, Bač, Serbia
- Coordinates: 45°23′27″N 19°06′10″E
- Public access: yes

The Bođani Monastery (Serbian: Манастир Бођани, romanized: Manastir Bođani) is a mediaeval Serbian Orthodox monastery in the Serbian Bačka region, Vojvodina province, Serbia. The monastery is near the village of Bođani, in the Bač municipality. Among the few Serbian Orthodox monasteries in the Bačka, Bođani is the oldest.

== History ==
The monastery was founded in 1478. According to myth, Bogdan, a merchant from Dalmatia, was travelling in the area when he got blind. In the vicinity of the Danube he stopped, washed his eyes at the nearby spring and his sight returned. As a gratitude, he built a monastery and dedicated it to the Presentation of the Blessed Virgin Mary. In time, the monastery was named after him (Bogdan - Bođani).

The church has been demolished and rebuilt several times. It was damaged in wars, burned in fires and flooded during the major floods of the Danube, like in the late 18th century or 1920s, when the church was flooded by water up to 1.5 m (4 ft 11 in) high. The existing church was built in 1722. After the last major reconstruction, a glass plate was installed in front of the altar, so that archaeological remains of the previous churches can be seen.

For a short period in the first half of the 1990s, Bođani became a female monastery.

== Architecture ==
The monastery complex consists of the Church of the Presentation of the Blessed Virgin Mary, konaks which surround the church from three sides shaped like a Cyrillic letter "П", a garden and an estate with auxiliary objects.

The church is built in the Baroque style. It is known for its frescoes, the work of Hristofor Žefarović, a translator of the Leonardo da Vinci's A Treatise on Painting in the Greek language, who painted them in the 1730s. They cover over 600 m^{2} (6,500 sq ft) of space. Instead of working with the wet plaster, which is one of the main characteristics of the frescoes, Žefarović used the oil paint on dry plaster. The presentation of the Biblical themes is also unusual and differs from the usual ones. He gave his interpretation, which was opposite to the canonical versions, so some consider his work as the spark of the modern Serbian painting. The semicircular supporting pillars are painted with the Book of Genesis motives, while to roof frescoes depict battles between the saints and demons, which have strange, animal-like heads. Saint Margaret the Virgin, in Serbian called Ognjena Marija ("Fiery Mary"), is shown bludgeoning the animal-like, winged and tailed demon with a hammer.

Iconostasis is a superb work of art of its own. It was made in the mid-18th century by an artisan from Kiev.

Bođani Monastery was declared Monument of Culture of Exceptional Importance in 1990, and it is protected by Republic of Serbia.

The monastery garden is popular among the local population and visitors. It has over 150 different plants from all parts of the world, like Egyptian cedar or numerous plants from the Americas. A project of planting the sequoia trees turned unsuccessful due to the climate.

== See also ==
- List of Serbian Orthodox monasteries

== Sources ==
- Krstić, Aleksandar; Magina, Adrian (2021). "The Belmužević Family: The Fate of a Noble Family in South-East Europe During the Turbulent Period of the Ottoman Conquest (the 15th and First Half of the 16th Centuries)". Revue des études sud-est européennes. 59: 105–123.
