= Church of Saint Anne, Bačko Novo Selo =

Church of Saint Anne
- Župna crkva Svete Ane
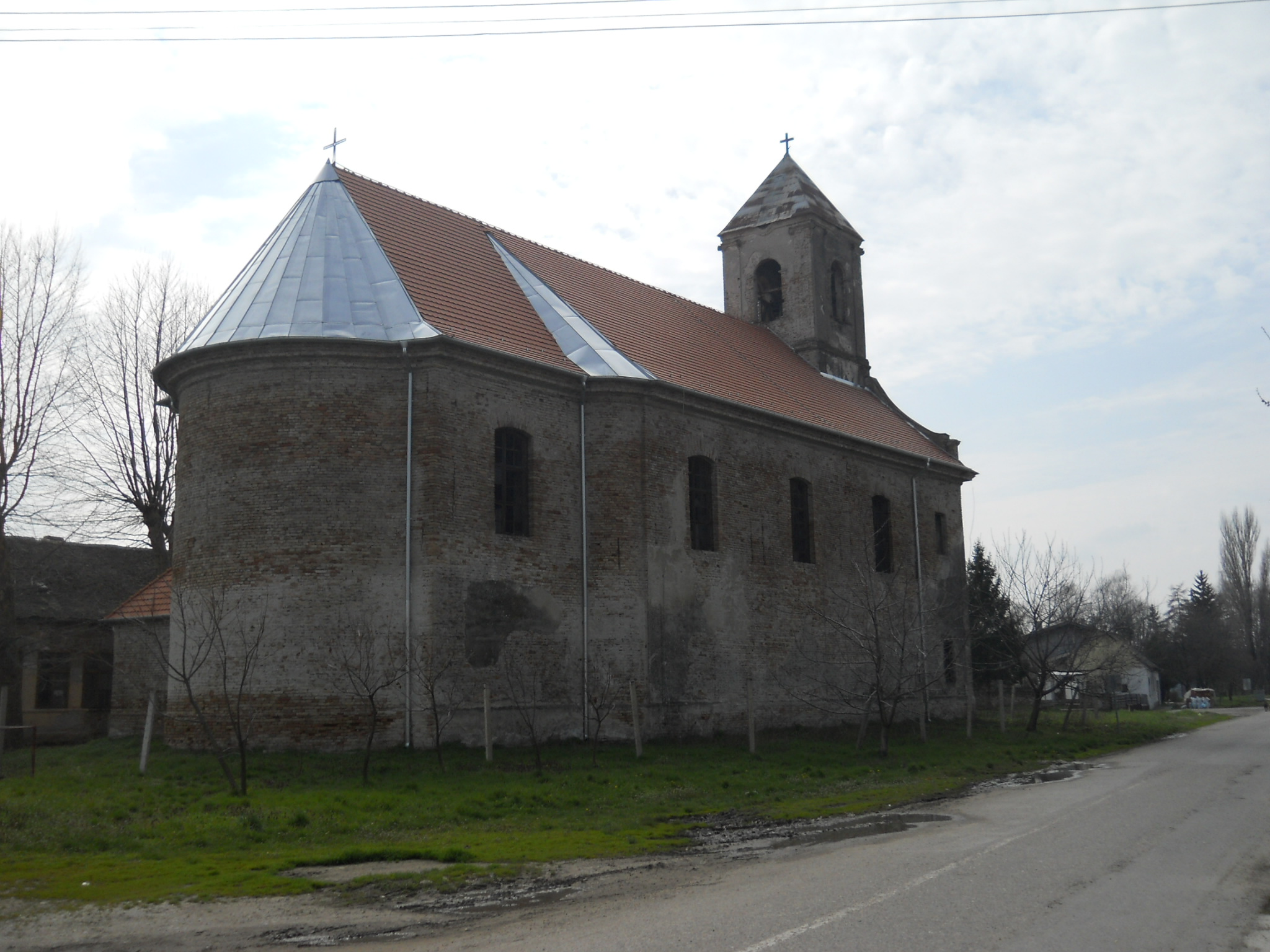
- Church of Saint Anne
- Church of Saint Anne
- 45°17′37″N 19°08′25″E
- Location: Bačko Novo Selo, Vojvodina
- Country: Serbia
- Denomination: Roman Catholic

History
- Dedication: Saint Anne

Architecture
- Style: Neoclassicism
- Years built: 1827-1829

Administration
- Archdiocese: Roman Catholic Diocese of Subotica

Church of Saint Anne (Serbo-Croatian: Župna crkva Svete Ane, Latin: Ecclesia parochiali S. Annae, German: St.-Anna-Kirche) is a Roman Catholic Parish church in Bačko Novo Selo in Vojvodina, Serbia. The church was constructed between 1827 and 1829. It is a part of Roman Catholic Diocese of Subotica.
