= Plavna =

Plavna Плавна (Serbian) Palona (Hungarian) Plavna (Slovak) Plavna (Croatian)
- Village (Selo)
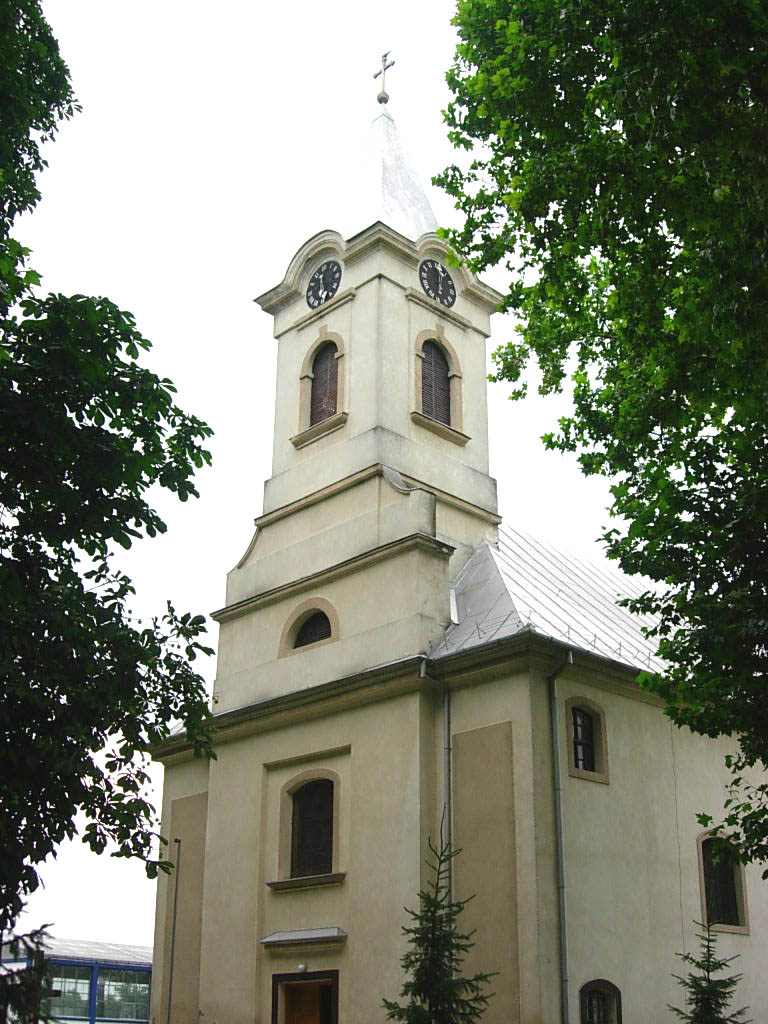
- Catholic Church in Plavna

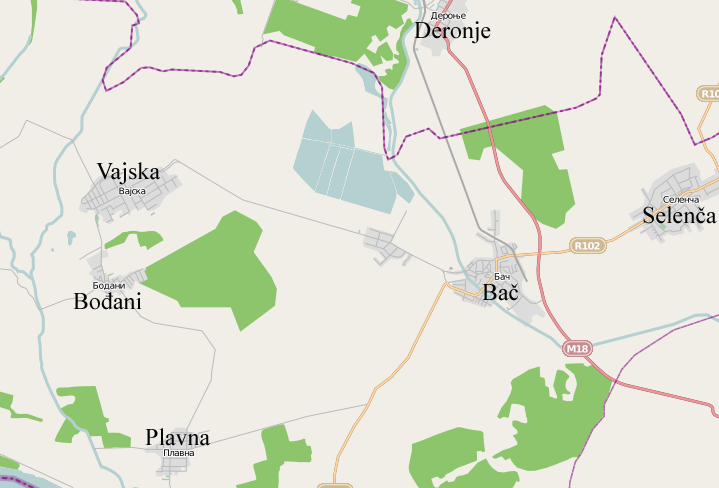
- Map of Plavna and other settlements in the neighborhood

- Location within Vojvodina Location within Serbia Location within Europe
- Country: Serbia
- Province: Vojvodina
- Region: Bačka (Podunavlje)
- District: South Bačka
- Municipality: Bač

Population (2002)
  - Total: 1,392
- Time zone: UTC+1 (CET)
  - Summer (DST): UTC+2 (CEST)

Plavna (Serbian Cyrillic: Плавна) is a village in Serbia. It is situated in the Bač municipality, in the South Bačka District, Vojvodina province. Its population is ethnically mixed and numbering 1,392 people (2002 census).

== Name ==
In Serbo-Croatian, the village is known as Plavna (Плавна), in Hungarian as Palona, and in German as Plawingen.

== Geography ==
It is located 150 km north of Belgrade and 75 km of Novi Sad, the capital of the province of Vojvodina, to the southwest of Bačka.

== Ethnic groups (2002 census) ==
Its population includes:

- 607 (43.61%) Serbs
- 312 (22.41%) Croats
- 145 (10.42%) Hungarians
- 112 (8.05%) Yugoslavs
- others

According to the 1991 census, the population of the village included 497 Croats, 389 Serbs, 278 Yugoslavs and 196 Hungarians.

== Historical population ==
- 1961: 2,662
- 1971: 2,033
- 1981: 1,712
- 1991: 1,538
- 2002: 1,392

== Tourism ==
There is a possibility of hunting deer, wild boars, hares, pheasants, partridges and wild ducks in an area of 600 hectares covered by wheat and corn.

The Plavna Hunting ground – Lovačka kuća (Houting house) is located in the village of Plavna surrounded by forests. Along with usual hunting activities, it offers the possibility of tours of the hunting ground, (photo) safaris, observing wildlife, etc. The restaurant can host up to 100 guests.

== Notable inhabitants ==
- Plavna is the birthplace of Antun Gustav Matoš's father, who was a Bunjevac.
- Josip Leko (b. 1948), Croatian politician
- József Novotny (1908–1944), chaplain, martyr of the Roman Catholic Church, a Hungarian of Czech or Slovak origin.
- Bálint Magyar de Palona (? - 1573), Hungarian general, captain of Fonyód.

== Gallery ==
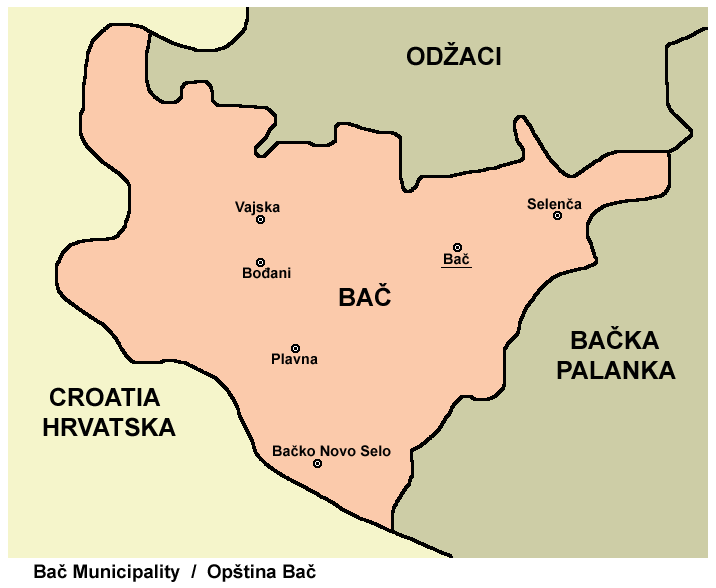
Map of the Bač municipality, showing the location of Plavna.

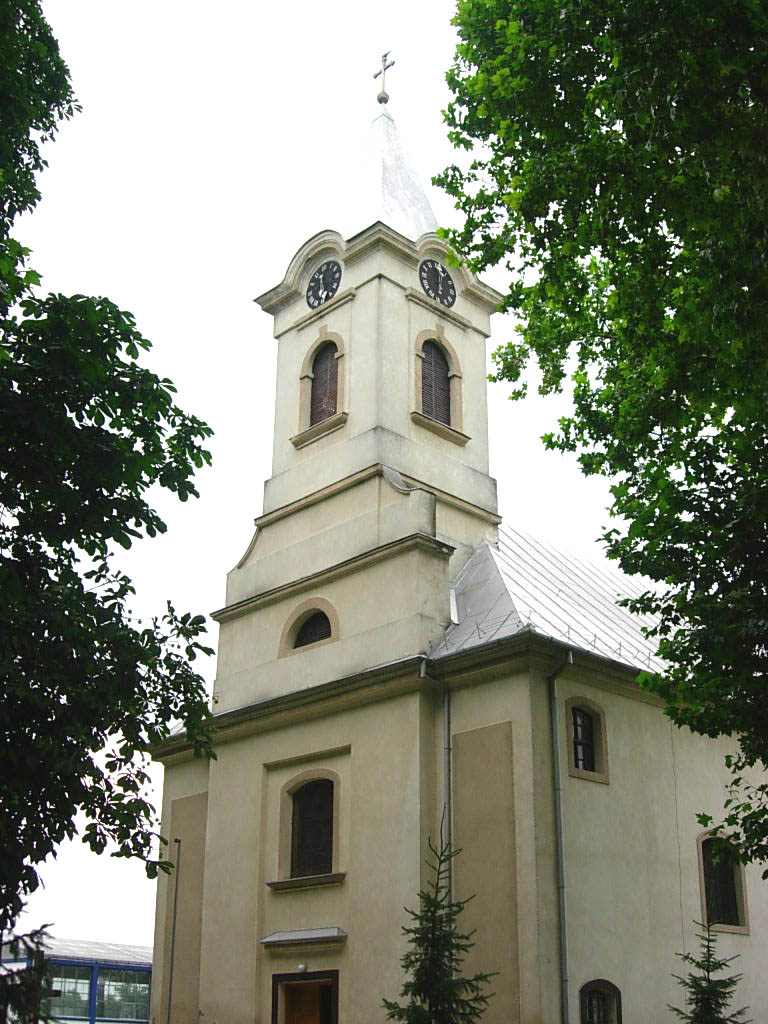
Saint Jackob the Apostle Catholic church.

== See also ==
- List of places in Serbia
- List of cities, towns and villages in Vojvodina
