= Bođani =

Bođani Бођани (Serbian) Bogyán (Hungarian) Boďany (Slovak) Bođani (Croatian)
- Village (Selo)
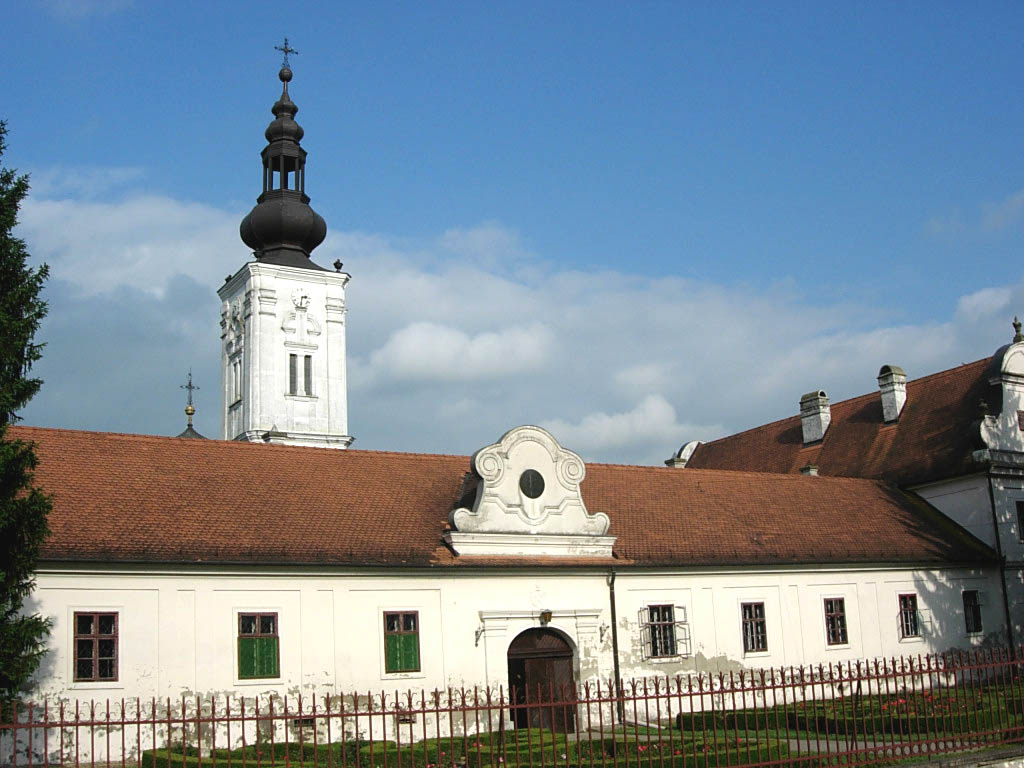
- The Bođani Orthodox monastery

- Location within Vojvodina Location within Serbia Location within Europe
- Coordinates: 45°23′N 19°06′E
- Country: Serbia
- Province: Vojvodina
- Region: Bačka (Podunavlje)
- District: South Bačka
- Municipality: Bač

Population (2002)
  - Total: 1,113
- Time zone: UTC+1 (CET)
  - Summer (DST): UTC+2 (CEST)

Bođani (Serbian Cyrillic: Бођани) is a village located in the Bač municipality which is in the South Bačka District of Serbia. The village is situated in the Autonomous Province of Vojvodina. The population of Bođani numbering 1,113 people (2002 census), most of whom are ethnic Serbs.

== Name ==
The name of the settlement in Serbian is plural.

== Demographics ==
Ethnic groups (2002 census):

- Serbs = 586
- Croats = 172
- Yugoslavs = 127
- Hungarians = 50
- Ukrainians = 46
- Roma = 28
- Slovaks = 17
- others.

== Historical population ==
- 1961: 2,533
- 1971: 1,879
- 1981: 1,559
- 1991: 1,323

== Gallery ==
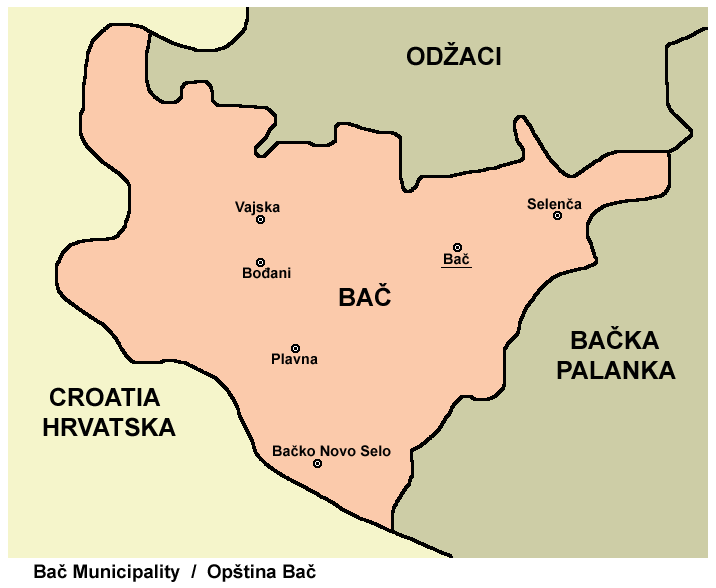
Map of the Bač municipality, showing the location of Bođani

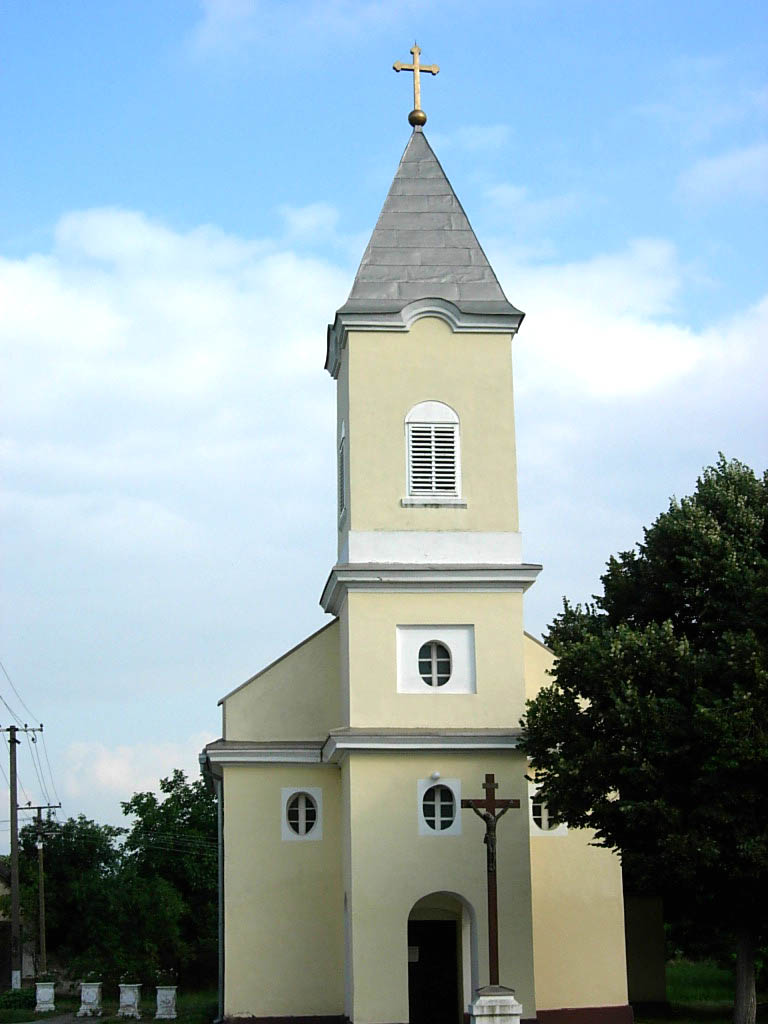
Saint Elias Catholic Church in Bođani

== See also ==
- Bođani monastery
- List of places in Serbia
- List of cities, towns and villages in Vojvodina
