= Mladenovo =

Mladenovo Младеново (Serbian)
- Village (Selo)
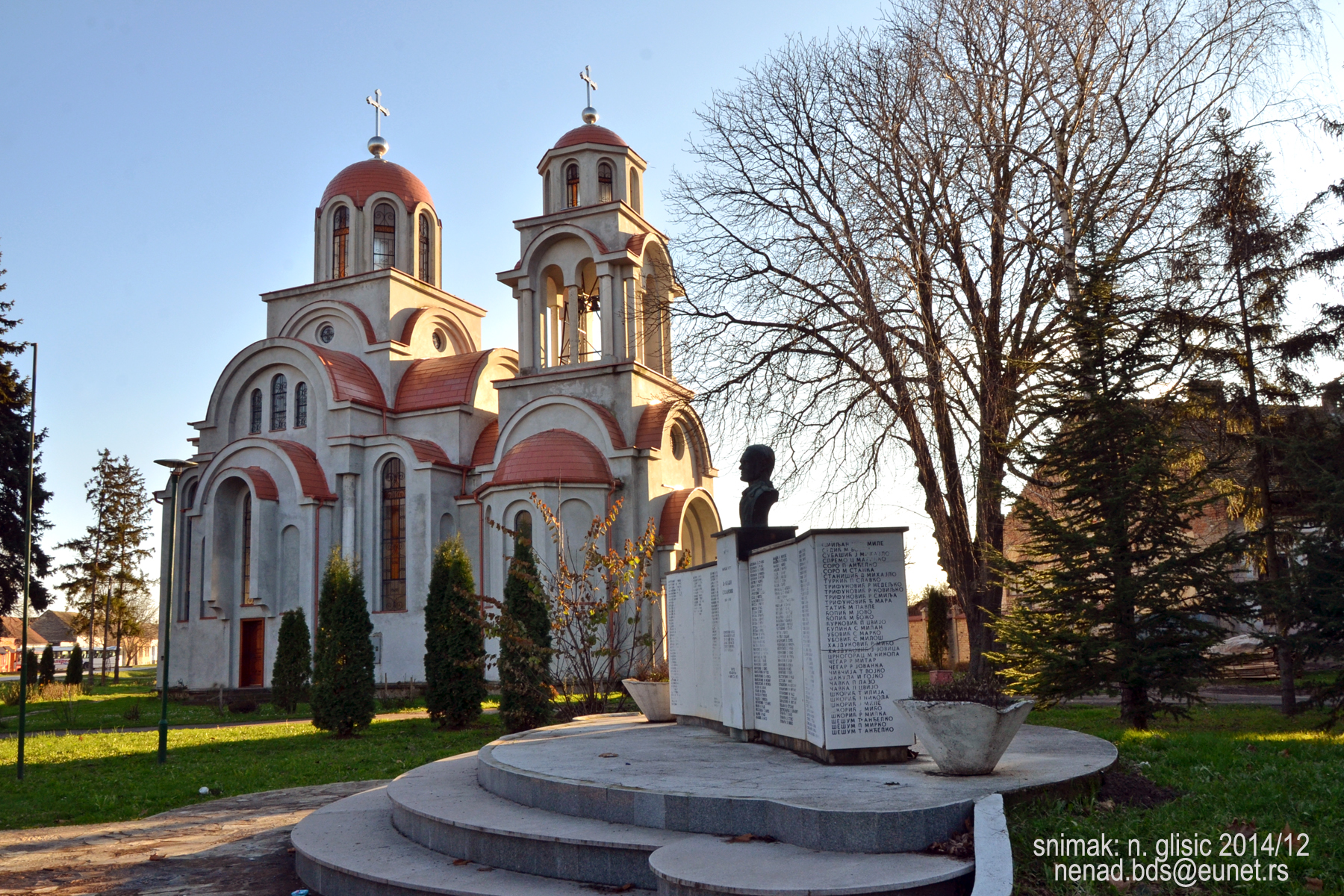
- The Orthodox Church in Mladenovo

- Location within Vojvodina Location within Serbia Location within Europe
- Coordinates: 45°18′N 19°16′E
- Country: Serbia
- Province: Vojvodina
- Region: Bačka (Podunavlje)
- District: South Bačka
- Municipality: Bačka Palanka

Population (2002)
  - Total: 3,358
- Time zone: UTC+1 (CET)
  - Summer (DST): UTC+2 (CEST)

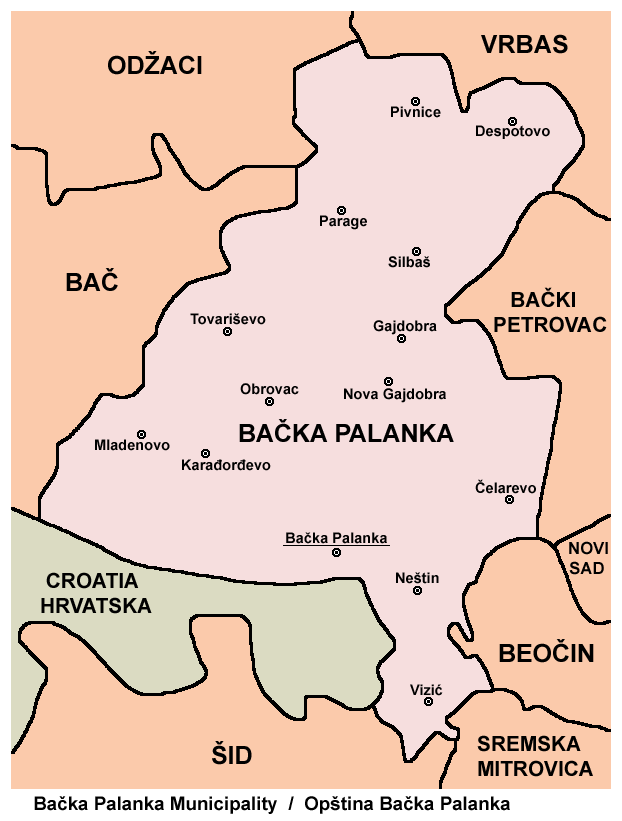
Map of the Bačka Palanka municipality, showing the location of Mladenovo

Mladenovo (Serbian Cyrillic: Младеново) is a village located in the Bačka Palanka municipality, in the South Bačka District of Serbia. It is situated in the Autonomous Province of Vojvodina. The village has a Serb ethnic majority and its population numbering 3,358 people (2002 census).

== Name ==
In Serbian, the village is known as Mladenovo (Младеново), in Croatian as Bukin, in German as Bukin, and in Hungarian as Dunabökény. Before 1945, when new name for the village was introduced, name for this village in Serbian was also Bukin (Букин).

== History ==
The history of Mladenovo starts in mid-13th century. Hungarian count Buky received an island Hagli, three kilometers south of present-day Mladenovo, from king Béla IV. He built a small village on the island and called it Buky (Bukin). The village kept that name until after World War II, when the name was changed to Mladenovo. During the Ottoman rule in the 16th and 17th century, the village of Bukin was mainly inhabited by ethnic Serbs.

In 1750 there was a disaster: flood destroyed the village and people moved 1.5 kilometers north and rebuilt the village. Sixty years later, in 1810, there was another catastrophic flood in which many people lost their lives. The village was again rebuilt another 1.5 kilometers north, on higher ground (87 meters above sea level). Germans started to settle here in 1812. Agriculture was advancing rapidly in Bukin in the 19th century and the village got its first post office, library, ambulance and school. As an advanced village, Bukin became a municipality in 1912. After World War II, people called the village Mladenovo, after the name of doctor Mladen Stojanović, a war hero. They built a statue of Mladen Stojanović in the center of the village.

== Demographics ==
=== 1991 ===
The population of the Mladenovo (1991 census):

- Serbs = 3,112
- Yugoslavs = 162
- Hungarians = 19
- Croats = 19
- Others (including Slovaks, Germans, etc.) = 35

=== 2002 ===
The population of the Mladenovo (2002 census):

- Serbs = 3,171
- Yugoslavs = 63
- Croats = 20
- Hungarians = 16
- others.

== Historical population ==
- 1961: 5,080
- 1971: 4,125
- 1981: 3,380
- 1991: 3,363

== See also ==
- Bačka Palanka
- South Bačka District
- Bačka
- List of places in Serbia
- List of cities, towns and villages in Vojvodina

== Gallery ==
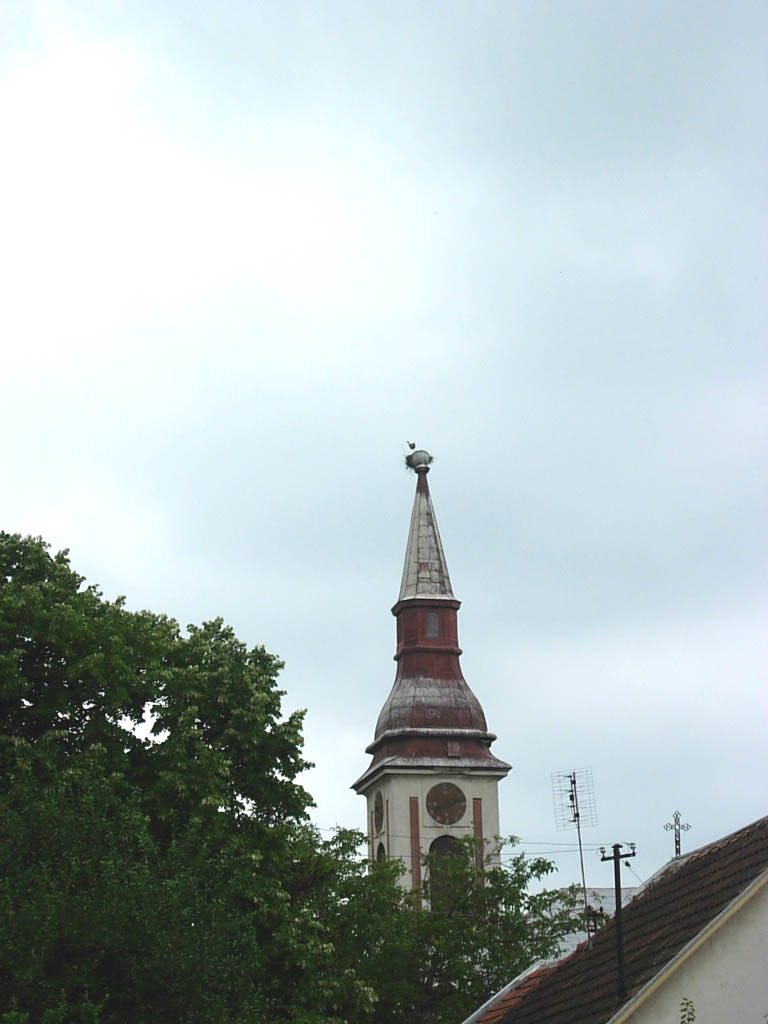
The Saint John the Baptizer Catholic Church.
