= Árpád Fremond =

Serbian politician (born 1981)

- Fremond Árpád

Leader of the Hungarian National Council of Serbia
- Incumbent
- Assumed office 16 December 2022
- Preceded by: Jene Hajnal

Member of the National Assembly of the Republic of Serbia
- In office 11 June 2008 – 8 December 2022

Personal details
- Born: 4 December 1981 (age 43); Bačka Topola, SR Serbia, SFR Yugoslavia
- Political party: VMSZ

Árpád Fremond (Serbian Cyrillic: Арпад Фремонд, romanized: Arpad Fremond; born 4 December 1981) is a Serbian politician from the country's Hungarian community. He served in the Serbian parliament from 2008 to 2022 and has led Serbia's Hungarian National Council since December 2022. Fremond is a member of the Alliance of Vojvodina Hungarians (VMSZ)

== Early life and private career ==
Fremond was born in Bačka Topola, in what was then the Socialist Autonomous Province of Vojvodina in the Socialist Republic of Serbia, Socialist Federal Republic of Yugoslavia. Raised in the nearby village of Pačir, he earned a degree from Bačka Topola's agricultural college in 2000 as a veterinary technician. He later graduated from the faculty of teacher training at the University of Novi Sad (Subotica branch) in Sombor, and in 2011 he earned a master's degree from the same institution.

== Politician ==
=== Early years (2000–08) ===
Fremond joined the VMSZ in 2000 and was a founding member of its youth wing. He appeared on the party's electoral list for the Vojvodina provincial assembly in the 2004 provincial election and its list for the Bačka Topola municipal assembly in the concurrent 2004 local elections, although he did not receive a mandate to serve at either level.

He received the fifth position on the VMSZ's list in the 2007 Serbian parliamentary election. The party won three seats, and he was not included in its assembly delegation. (From 2000 to 2011, Serbian parliamentary mandates were awarded to sponsoring parties or coalitions rather than to individual candidates, and it was common practice for the mandates to be assigned out of numerical order. Fremond's specific list position had no formal bearing on his chances of election.)

=== Parliamentarian (2008–2022) ===
==== Cvetković administration (2008–2012) ====
In the 2008 parliamentary election, Fremond received the thirty-third position on the electoral list of the Hungarian Coalition, a multi-party alliance led by the VMSZ. The coalition won four seats, all of which were assigned to VMSZ members, and on this occasion he was given a mandate. He also appeared on the Hungarian Coalition's list for Bačka Topola in the 2008 local elections; as in 2004, he did not take a seat at the local level.

The overall results of the 2008 parliamentary election were inconclusive, but the For a European Serbia (ZES) alliance ultimately formed a coalition government with the Socialist Party of Serbia (SPS), and the VMSZ provided crucial support to the administration in the assembly. In his first term, Fremond was a member of the committee on agriculture and the committee on local self-government; a deputy member of the education committee, the labour committee, (Note: Formally known as the Committee on Labour, Veterans' Affairs, and Social Affairs.) and the committee on development and international relations; and a member of the parliamentary friendship groups with Austria, Romania, and Slovenia.

==== Dačić and Vučić administrations (2012–2017) ====
Serbia's electoral system was reformed in 2011, such that all parliamentary mandates were awarded to candidates on successful lists in numerical order. Fremond was given the fourth position on the VMSZ's list for the 2012 parliamentary election and was re-elected when the list won five mandates. The Serbian Progressive Party (SNS) won a plurality victory and afterward formed a new coalition government with the SPS and other parties; the VMSZ declined an invitation to join the government and instead served in a largely nominal opposition role for the next two years. In his third term, Fremond was a member of the agriculture committee, (Note: Formally known as the Agriculture, Forestry, and Water Management Committee.) a deputy member of the committee on human and minority rights and gender equality, and a member of the friendship groups with Hungary and Slovenia.

He again received the fourth position on the VMSZ list for the 2014 parliamentary election and was re-elected when the list won six mandates. After the election, the VMSZ began supporting Serbia's SNS-led government in the assembly. Fremond was promoted to deputy chair of the agriculture committee and also served as a deputy member of the finance committee (Note: Formally known as the Committee on Finance, Budget, and Control of Public Spending.) and the education committee, (Note: Formally known as the Committee on Education, Science, Technological Development, and the Information Society.) while remaining a member of the friendship groups with Hungary and Slovenia.

In the 2016 parliamentary election, Fremond was promoted to the third position on the VMSZ list and was re-elected when the list won four seats. He held the same committee assignments as in the previous parliament and also served as a deputy member of the committee on the rights of the child. During this term, he was a member of the friendship groups with Croatia and Hungary.

==== Brnabić administration (2017–2022) ====
The VMSZ led a successful drive to increase its voter turnout in the 2020 Serbian parliamentary election and won a record nine seats. Fremond, who again appeared in the third list position, was elected to a fifth term. He continued to serve as deputy chair of the agricultural committee and was a deputy member of the committee on constitutional and legal issues, the health and family committee, and the environmental protection committee, as well as participating in the friendship groups with Croatia, the Czech Republic, and Hungary. Fremond also received the sixth position on the VMSZ's list for Bačka Topola in the concurrent 2020 Serbian local elections and was elected to the municipal parliament when the list won a majority victory with nineteen out of thirty-five seats.

He once again appeared in the third position on the VMSZ's list in the 2022 parliamentary election and was re-elected as the list fell back to five seats. In the parliament that followed, he was a member of the agriculture committee and a deputy member of the education committee, the judiciary committee, (Note: Formally known as the Committee on Judiciary, Public Administration, and Local Self-Government.) and the culture and information committee.

In parliament, Fremond often spoke on issues pertaining to Vojvodina's farming and dairy-producing communities.

=== Leader of the Hungarian National Council ===
Fremond led the Hungarian Unity list in the 2022 election for Serbia's Hungarian National Council The outcome of the election was not in doubt; no other lists participated, and Hungarian Unity won all thirty-five available seats. Fremond resigned from the national assembly on 8 December 2022 (and from the Bačka Topola municipal assembly on 13 December) and was chosen as president of the council on 16 December.

Fremond received the symbolic final position (250th) on the VMSZ's list in the 2023 Serbian parliamentary election and the equally symbolic final position (35th) on the party's list for Bačka Topola in the 2024 Serbian local elections.
