= Mali Beograd (Bačka Topola) =

Mali Beograd Мали Београд (Serbian)
- Village (Selo)
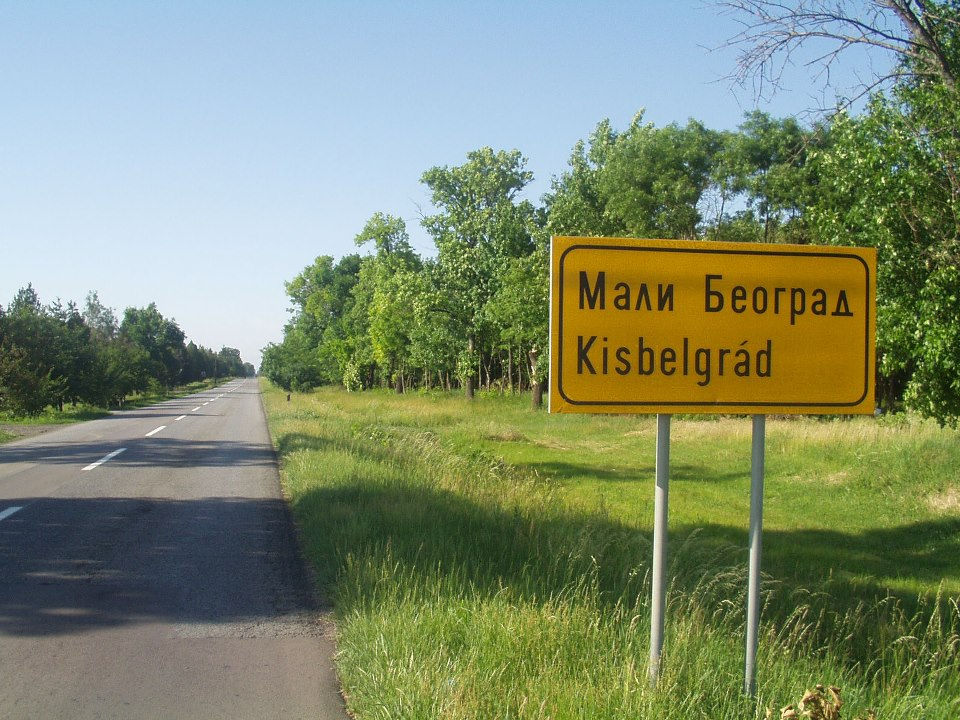

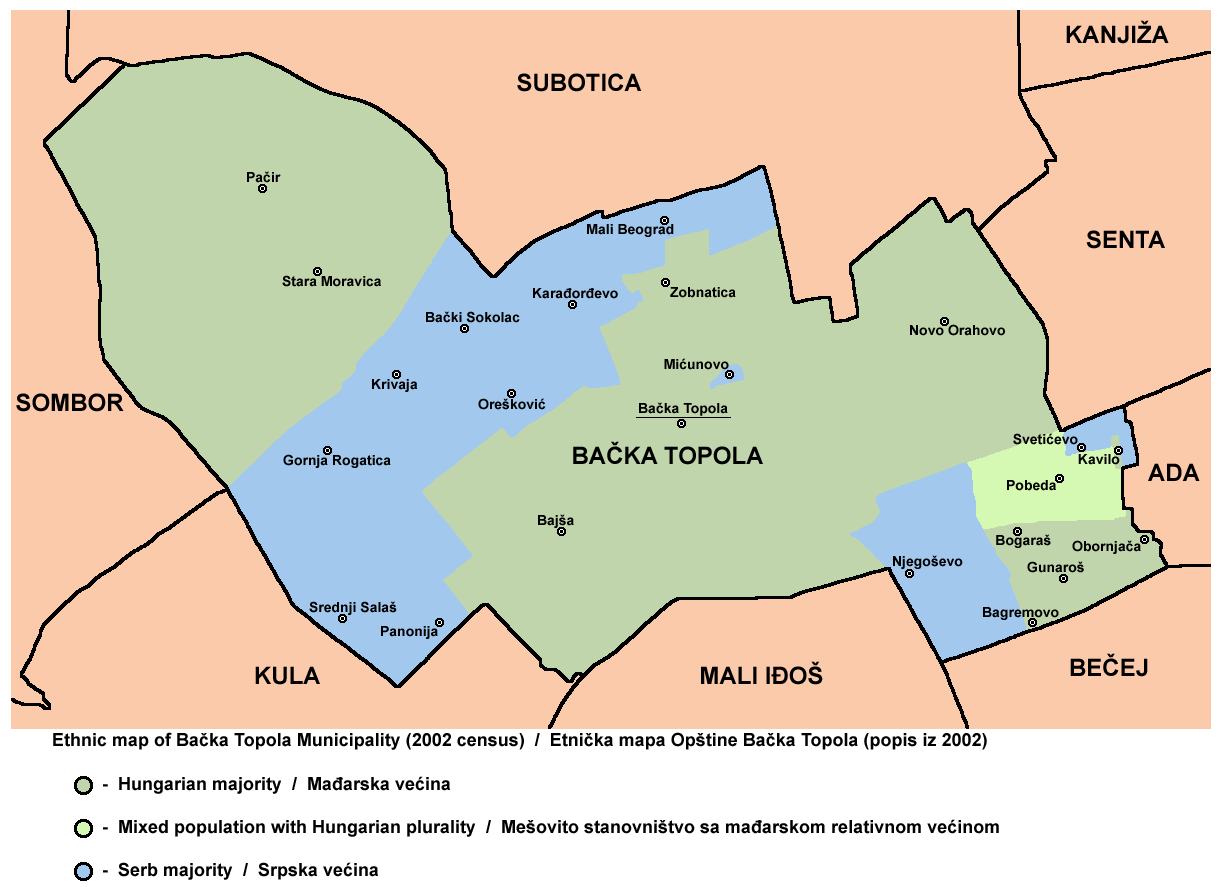
- Map of the Bačka Topola municipality showing the location of Mali Beograd

- Location within Vojvodina Location within Serbia Location within Europe
- Coordinates: 45°53′4″N 19°38′5″E
- Country: Serbia
- Province: Vojvodina
- District: North Bačka District
- Municipality: Bačka Topola
- Established: 1921
- Elevation: 354 ft (108 m)

Population (2011)
  - Total: 456
- Time zone: UTC+1 (CET)
  - Summer (DST): UTC+2 (CEST)

Historical population
Year	Pop.	±%
1948	272	—
1953	494	+81.6%
1961	616	+24.7%
1971	532	−13.6%
1981	463	−13.0%
1991	503	+8.6%
2002	524	+4.2%
2011	456	−13.0%

Mali Beograd (Serbian Cyrillic: Мали Београд, Hungarian: Kisbelgrád), is a village in northern Serbia. It is situated in the municipality of Bačka Topola, in the North Bačka District of the Vojvodina province. The village had a population of 456 in 2011 and a Serb ethnic majority.

== Location ==
The village is located along both sides of the Belgrade-Subotica main road, 9 km (5.6 mi) north of its municipal seat, Bačka Topola. Village of Zobnatica is located 2 km (1.2 mi) to the south, via the main road, between Mali Beograd and Bačka Topola. Village of Karađorđevo is to the southwest, while the first settlement to the north, 7 km (4.3 mi) along the main road, is the village of Stari Žednik, part of the Town of Subotica.

== Geography ==
Mali Beograd, a typical road settlement, is situated in the valley of the Krivaja river, on the loess plateau east of the river, at an altitude of 108 m (354 ft). At Zobnatica, the Krivaja is dammed, creating a 5.5 km (3.4 mi) long artificial Zobnatica Lake, with an area of 2.55 km^{2} (0.98 sq mi), used for irrigation and tourism.

== Name ==
Both Serbian and Hungarian name means "Little Belgrade".

== History ==
In 1920, 54 families from the Krbava field in the Lika region, today in Croatia, embarked on a trip to Belgrade, the capital of Serbia. They didn't reach it, getting stuck in the empty fields in the Bačka region. As they were families of the volunteers from the Salonika front in 1918, each family was granted a 5 ha (12 acres) of land, so they decided to settle there. The settlers decided to call their establishment Mali Beograd and carved that name in the bark of an old poplar tree, around which the settlement gradually developed.

The settlers cultivated the area and expanded the settlement on their own, with the help from the local landed gentry, the Vojnić and Lelbach families. The settlement was originally scattered across the meadows, but grew into the grid formation after the Belgrade-Subotica main road was built through the village in the mid-1930s. Another group of settlers, from the Bosnian Krajina, built their own settlement, also in 1921. That hamlet, constructed on the estate of the Lelbah family, was named Kočićevo in 1938 but is fully connected with Mali Beograd into one settlement.

The village was electrified after World War II and by the early 2000s almost completely equipped with the waterworks. The elementary school was opened in 1931 but after the depopulation began in the 1960s, it was closed in 1972. The post office is still operational. Last kafana in the village was closed in 1989.

== Municipality ==
Mali Beograd had its own municipality which comprised the neighboring villages of Zobnatica and Karađorđevo, covering an area of 55.97 km^{2} (21.61 sq mi). It had a population of 2,311 in 1948 and 2,328 in 1953, after which it was annexed to the municipality of Bačka Topola.

Mali Beograd is still seat of a local community, a sub-municipal administrative unit, which also comprises Zobnatica.

== Economy ==
The village is a typical agricultural settlement. The agriculture was developed, both private (numerous farmsteads) and state owned ("Zobnatica" agricultural farm). Main products included wheat, corn, sugar beets, vegetables, pigs, poultry and cattle. However, due to the depopulation, the agricultural production dwindled, and by January 2018 there were only 3 cows and one grocery shop in the entire village. The daily commuting of the population, mostly for work in Bačka Topola and the industrial zone in Subotica was always high (including students after the school was closed), which by the late 2010s basically remained the only economic activity of the villagers. Neighboring Zobnatica is known for its horse stables.

== Sources ==
- Slobodan Ćurčić, Broj stanovnika Vojvodine, Novi Sad, 1996.

== See also ==
- List of places in Serbia
- List of cities, towns and villages in Vojvodina
