= Bogaraš =

Bogaraš can refer to:

- Bogaraš (Senta), a village in Senta municipality, Serbia.
- Bogaraš (Bačka Topola), a village in Bačka Topola municipality, Serbia.
