= Krivaja, Bačka Topola =

Krivaja Криваја (Serbian)
- Village (Selo)
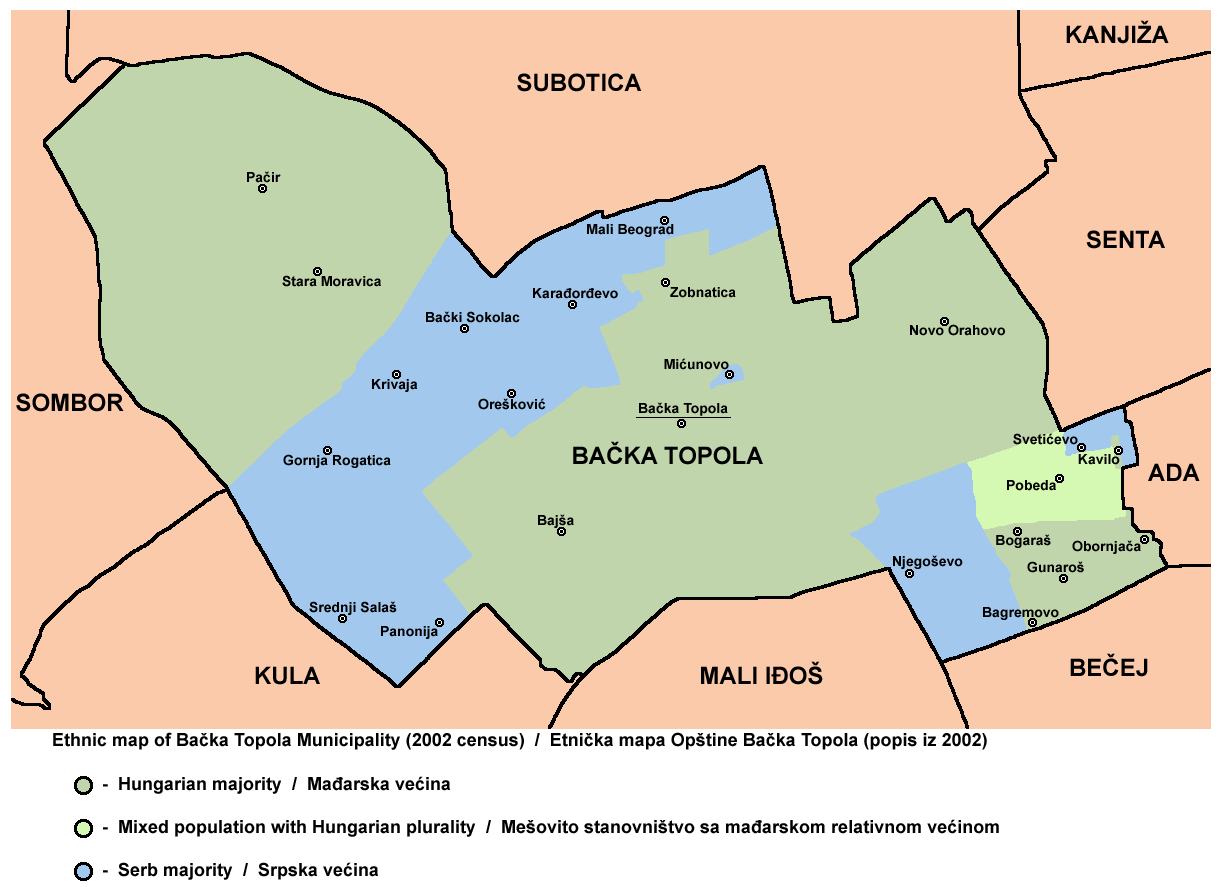
- Map of the Bačka Topola municipality showing the location of Krivaja

- Location within Vojvodina Location within Serbia Location within Europe
- Coordinates: 45°49′57″N 19°30′21″E
- Country: Serbia
- Province: Vojvodina
- District: North Bačka District
- Municipality: Bačka Topola

Population (2002)
  - Total: 986
- Time zone: UTC+1 (CET)
  - Summer (DST): UTC+2 (CEST)

Krivaja (Serbian Cyrillic: Криваја) is a village in Serbia. It is situated in the Bačka Topola municipality, in the North Bačka District, Vojvodina province. The village has a Serb ethnic majority and its population numbering 986 people (2002 census).

== Name ==
In Serbian the village is known as Krivaja (Криваја), in Hungarian as Bácsér or Kanyarodó, and in Croatian as Krivaja.

== Historical population ==
- 1981: 680
- 1991: 910
- 2002: 986

== See also ==
- Bačka Topola municipality
- List of places in Serbia
- List of cities, towns and villages in Vojvodina
