= Bagremovo =

Bagremovo Багремово (Serbian) Brazília (Hungarian)
- Village (Selo)
- Location within Vojvodina Location within Serbia Location within Europe
- Coordinates: 45°45′N 19°49′E
- Country: Serbia
- Province: Vojvodina
- District: North Bačka District
- Municipality: Bačka Topola

Population (2011)
  - Total: 151
- Time zone: UTC+1 (CET)
  - Summer (DST): UTC+2 (CEST)

Bagremovo (Serbian Cyrillic: Багремово, Hungarian: Brazília or Bárdossyfalva) is a village in Serbia. It is situated in the Bačka Topola municipality, in the North Bačka District, Vojvodina province. As of 2011, the village had a population of 151.

== See also ==
- List of places in Serbia
- List of cities, towns and villages in Vojvodina
