= Svetićevo =

Svetićevo Светићево (Serbian)
- Village (Selo)
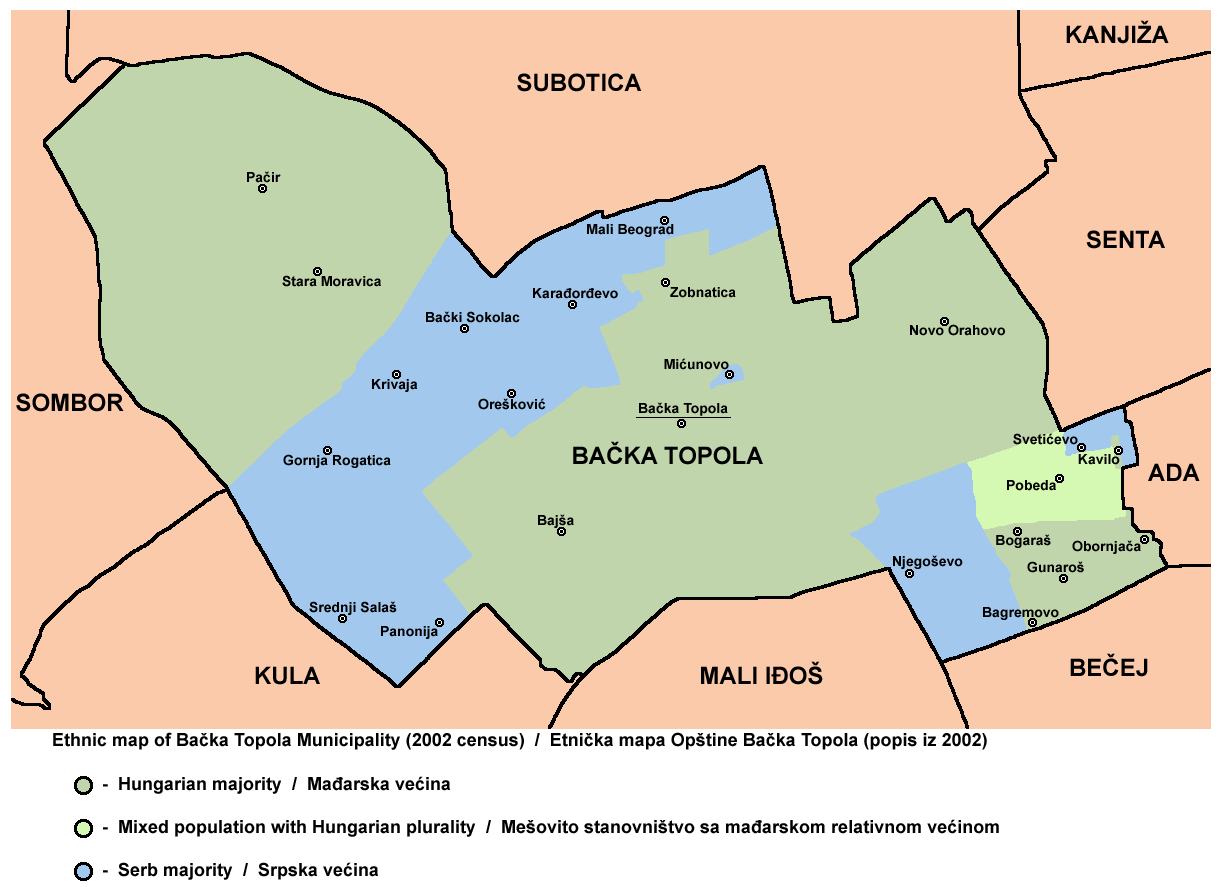
- Map of the Bačka Topola municipality showing the location of Svetićevo

- Location within Vojvodina Location within Serbia Location within Europe
- Coordinates: 45°48′N 19°51′E
- Country: Serbia
- Province: Vojvodina
- District: North Bačka District
- Municipality: Bačka Topola

Population (2002)
  - Total: 205
- Time zone: UTC+1 (CET)
  - Summer (DST): UTC+2 (CEST)

Svetićevo (Serbian Cyrillic: Светићево) is a village in Serbia. It is situated in the Bačka Topola municipality, in the North Bačka District, Vojvodina province. The village has a Serb ethnic majority and its population numbering 205 people (2002 census).

== Name ==
In Serbian the village is known as Svetićevo (Светићево); in Hungarian as Buránysor, Szvetityevo, Székelytornyos or Istenkeze; and in Croatian as Svetićevo.

== Historical population ==
- 1961: 1,292
- 1971: 1,148
- 1981: 257
- 1991: 229
- 2002: 205

== See also ==
- List of places in Serbia
- List of cities, towns and villages in Vojvodina
