= Novo Orahovo =

Novo Orahovo Ново Орахово (Serbian) Новe Орахово (Pannonian Rusyn) Zentagunaras (Hungarian)
- Village (Selo)
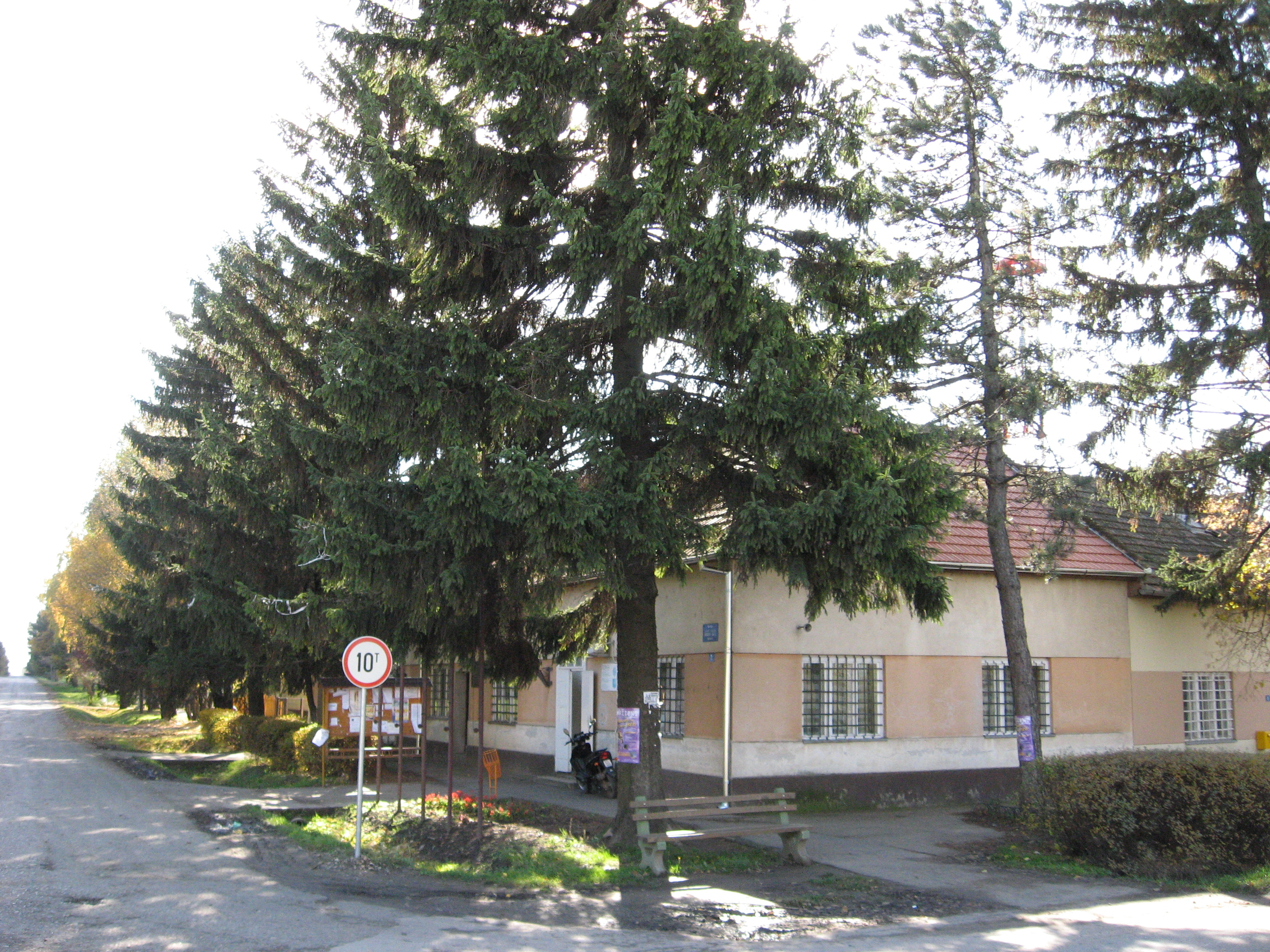

- Seal

- Location within Vojvodina Location within Serbia Location within Europe
- Coordinates: 45°51′N 19°46′E
- Country: Serbia
- Province: Vojvodina
- District: North Bačka District
- Municipality: Bačka Topola

Population (2002)
  - Total: 2,029
- Time zone: UTC+1 (CET)
  - Summer (DST): UTC+2 (CEST)

Novo Orahovo (Serbian Cyrillic: Ново Орахово, Hungarian: Zentagunaras, Rusyn: Нове Орахово) is a village in Serbia. It is situated in the Bačka Topola municipality, in the North Bačka District, Vojvodina province. The village has a Hungarian ethnic majority and its population numbering 2,029 people (2002 census).

The village has a Pannonian Rusyn speaking minority. The name of the village is Нове Ораховo in Pannonian Rusyn, which is used beside the Serbian name on the road side tables at both entrances to the village.

== See also ==
- List of places in Serbia
- List of cities, towns and villages in Vojvodina
