= Gunaroš =

Gunaroš Гунарош (Serbian) Gunaras (Hungarian)
- Village (Selo)
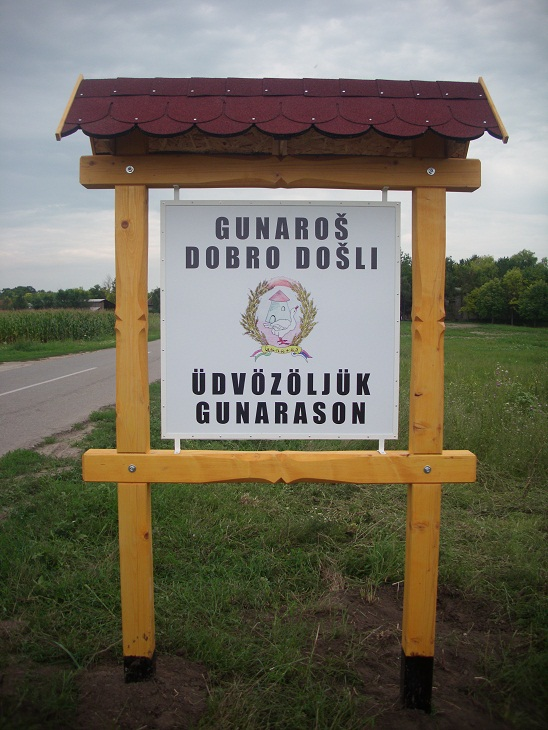

- Location within Vojvodina Location within Serbia Location within Europe
- Coordinates: 45°46′N 19°50′E
- Country: Serbia
- Province: Vojvodina
- District: North Bačka District
- Municipality: Bačka Topola

Population (2002)
  - Total: 1,441
- Time zone: UTC+1 (CET)
  - Summer (DST): UTC+2 (CEST)

Gunaroš (Serbian Cyrillic: Гунарош, Hungarian: Gunaras) is a village in Serbia. It is situated in the Bačka Topola municipality, in the North Bačka District, Vojvodina province. The village has a Hungarian ethnic majority of over 97%, and its population numbers 1,441 people (2002 census).

== See also ==
- List of places in Serbia
- List of cities, towns and villages in Vojvodina
