= Bajša =

Bajša Бајша (Serbian) Bajsa (Hungarian)
- Village (Selo)
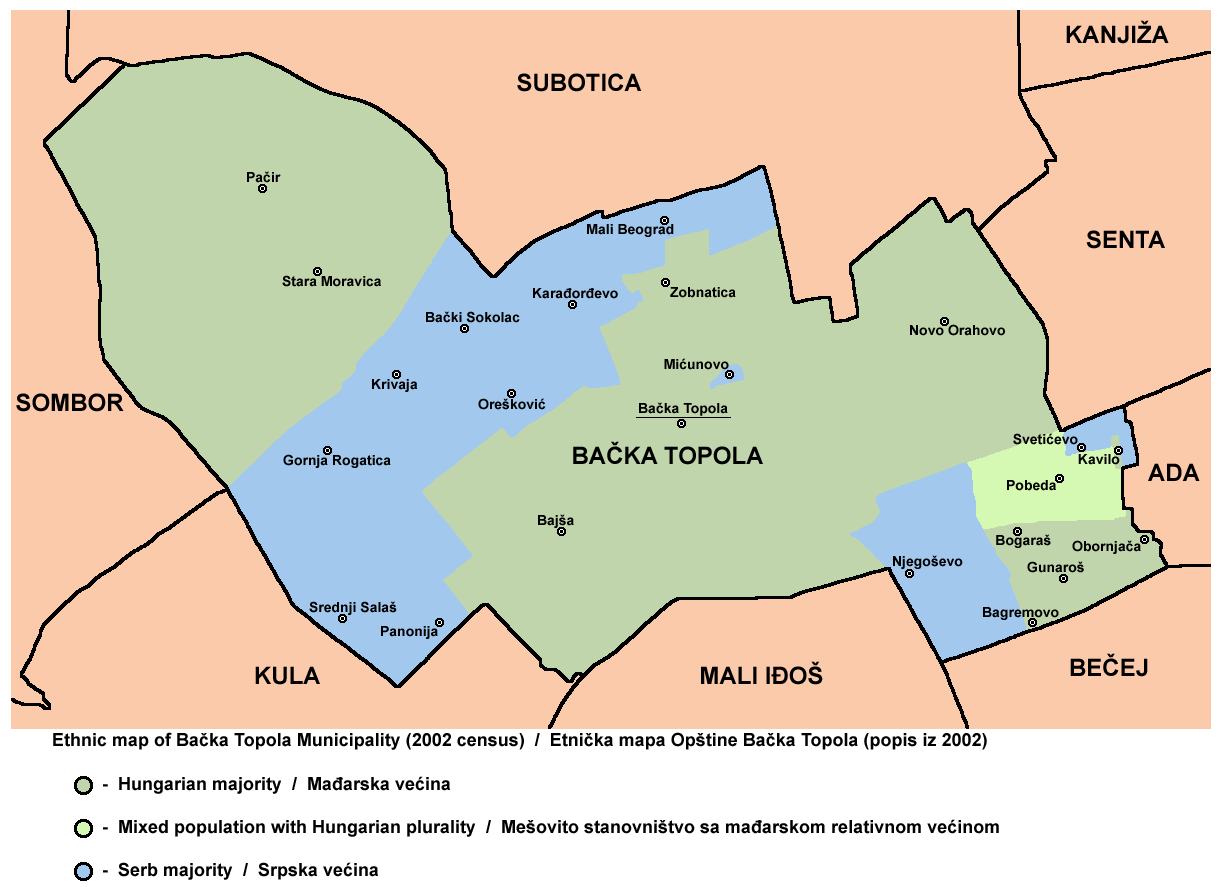
- Map of the Bačka Topola municipality showing the location of Bajša

- Location within Vojvodina Location within Serbia Location within Europe
- Country: Serbia
- Province: Vojvodina
- District: North Bačka District
- Municipality: Bačka Topola

Population (2002)
  - Total: 2,568
- Time zone: UTC+1 (CET)
  - Summer (DST): UTC+2 (CEST)

Bajša (Serbian: Бајша / Bajša, Hungarian: Bajsa) is a village located in the Bačka Topola municipality, in the North Bačka District of Serbia. It is situated in the Autonomous Province of Vojvodina. The village has a Hungarian ethnic majority and its population numbering 2,568 people (2002 census).

== Historical population ==
- 1969: 3,690
- 1969: 3,945
- 1969: 2,753
- 1969: 2,745

== See also ==
- List of places in Serbia
- List of cities, towns and villages in Vojvodina
