= Pobeda (Bačka Topola) =

Pobeda Победа (Serbian) Pobedabirtok (Hungarian)
- Village (Selo)
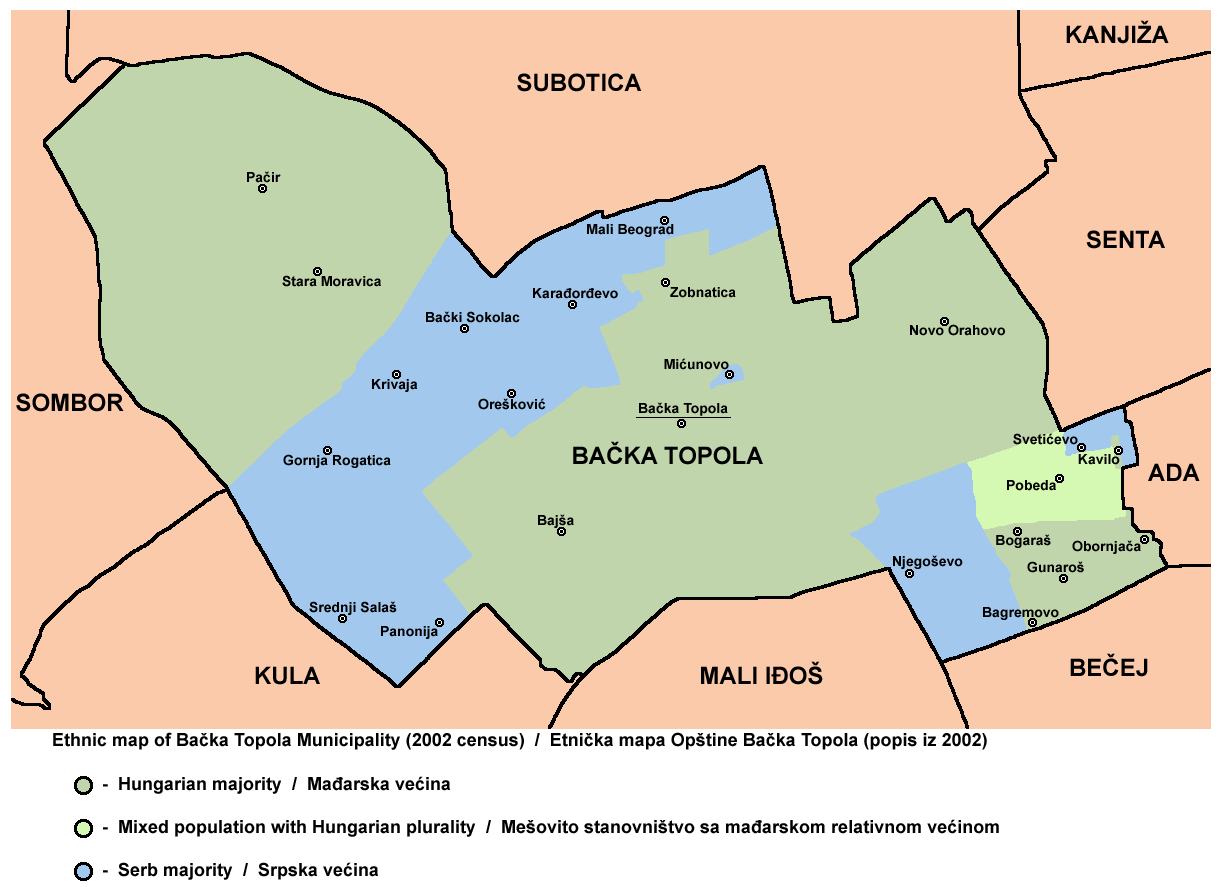
- Map of the Bačka Topola municipality showing the location of Pobeda

- Location within Vojvodina Location within Serbia Location within Europe
- Coordinates: 45.75°N 19.8167°E
- Country: Serbia
- Province: Vojvodina
- District: North Bačka District
- Municipality: Bačka Topola

Population (2002)
  - Total: 342
- Time zone: UTC+1 (CET)
  - Summer (DST): UTC+2 (CEST)

Pobeda (Serbian: Pobeda /Победа, Hungarian: Pobedabirtok, Croatian: Pobeda) is a village located in the Bačka Topola municipality, in the North Bačka District of Serbia. It is situated in the Autonomous Province of Vojvodina. The village is ethnically mixed and its population numbering 342 people (2002 census).

== Name ==
The name of the village means victory in the Serbian language.

== Ethnic groups (2002 census) ==
- Hungarians = 161 (47.08%)
- Serbs = 104 (30.41%)
- Croats = 23 (6.73%)
- others.

== Historical population ==
- 1981: 420
- 1991: 382

== See also ==
- Bačka Topola municipality
- List of places in Serbia
- List of cities, towns and villages in Vojvodina
