= Tomislavci =

Tomislavci Томиславци (Serbian)
- Village (Selo)
- Location of Tomislavci Tomislavci (Serbia) Tomislavci (Europe)
- Coordinates: 45°50′N 19°34′E
- Country: Serbia
- Province: Vojvodina
- District: North Bačka District
- Municipality: Bačka Topola

Population (2011)
  - Total: 541
- Time zone: UTC+1 (CET)
  - Summer (DST): UTC+2 (CEST)
- Postal code: 24000
- Area code: (+381) 24

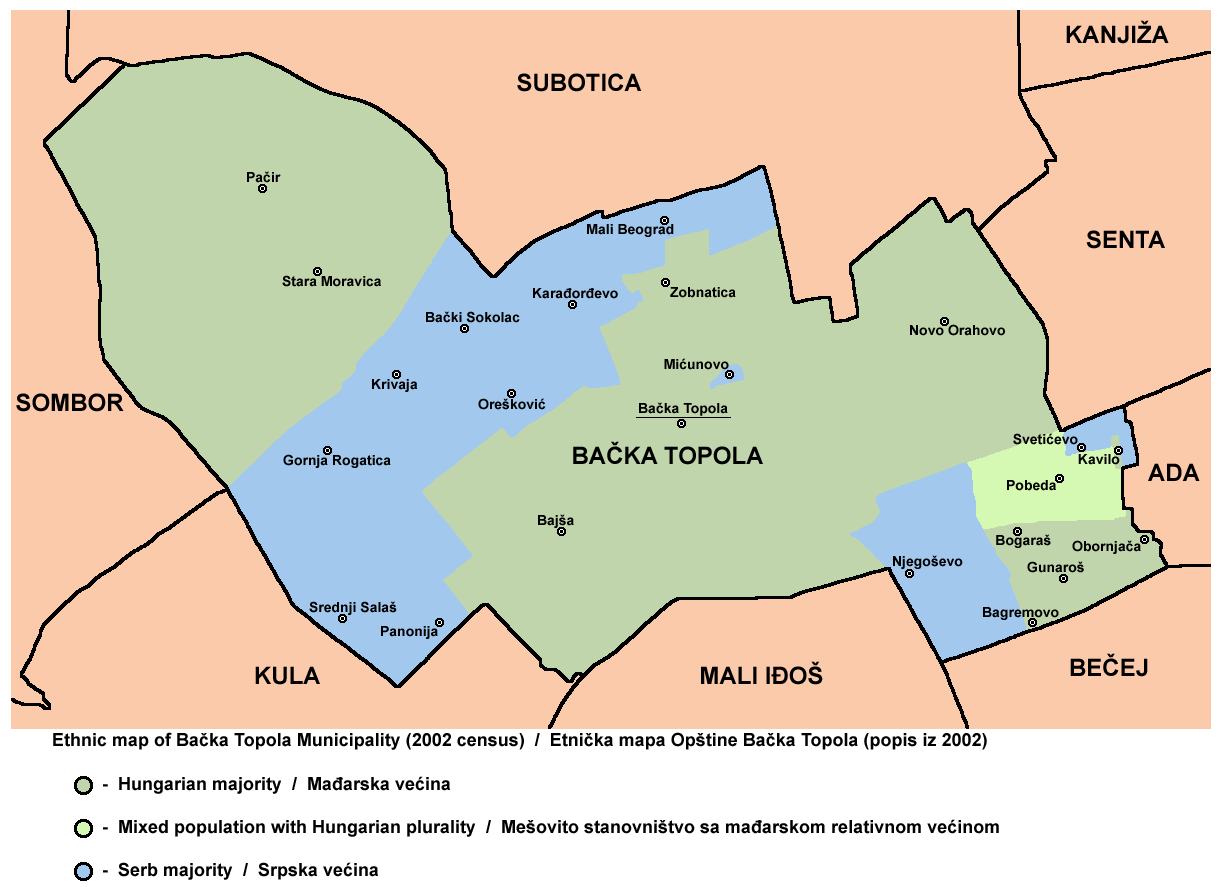
Map of the Bačka Topola municipality showing the location of Tomislavci

Tomislavci (Serbian Cyrillic: Томиславци) is a village located in the Bačka Topola municipality, in the North Bačka District of Serbia. It is situated in the Autonomous Province of Vojvodina. The village has a Serb ethnic majority and its population numbering 696 people (2002 census).

== Name ==
In Serbian the village is known as Tomislavci / Томиславци (formerly also Orešković / Орешковић), in Hungarian as Andrásmező, and in Croatian as Tomislavci.

== Historical population ==
Historical population
| Year | Pop. | ±% |
|---|---|---|
| 1961 | 1,192 | — |
| 1971 | 1,044 | −12.4% |
| 1981 | 830 | −20.5% |
| 1991 | 629 | −24.2% |

== See also ==
- List of places in Serbia
- List of cities, towns and villages in Vojvodina
