= Kavilo =

Kavilo Кавило (Serbian) Kavilló (Hungarian)
- Village (Selo)
- Location within Vojvodina Location within Serbia Location within Europe
- Coordinates: 45°48′11″N 19°51′16″E
- Country: Serbia
- Province: Vojvodina
- District: North Bačka District
- Municipality: Bačka Topola
- Time zone: UTC+1 (CET)
  - Summer (DST): UTC+2 (CEST)

Kavilo (Serbian Cyrillic: Кавило, Hungarian: Rákóczitelep or Kavilló) is a village in Serbia. It is situated in the Bačka Topola municipality, in the North Bačka District, Vojvodina province. The village has a Hungarian ethnic majority. Its population was 233 in the 2002 census.

== See also ==
- List of places in Serbia
- List of cities, towns and villages in Vojvodina
