= Panonija =

Panonija Панонија (Serbian)
- Village (Selo)
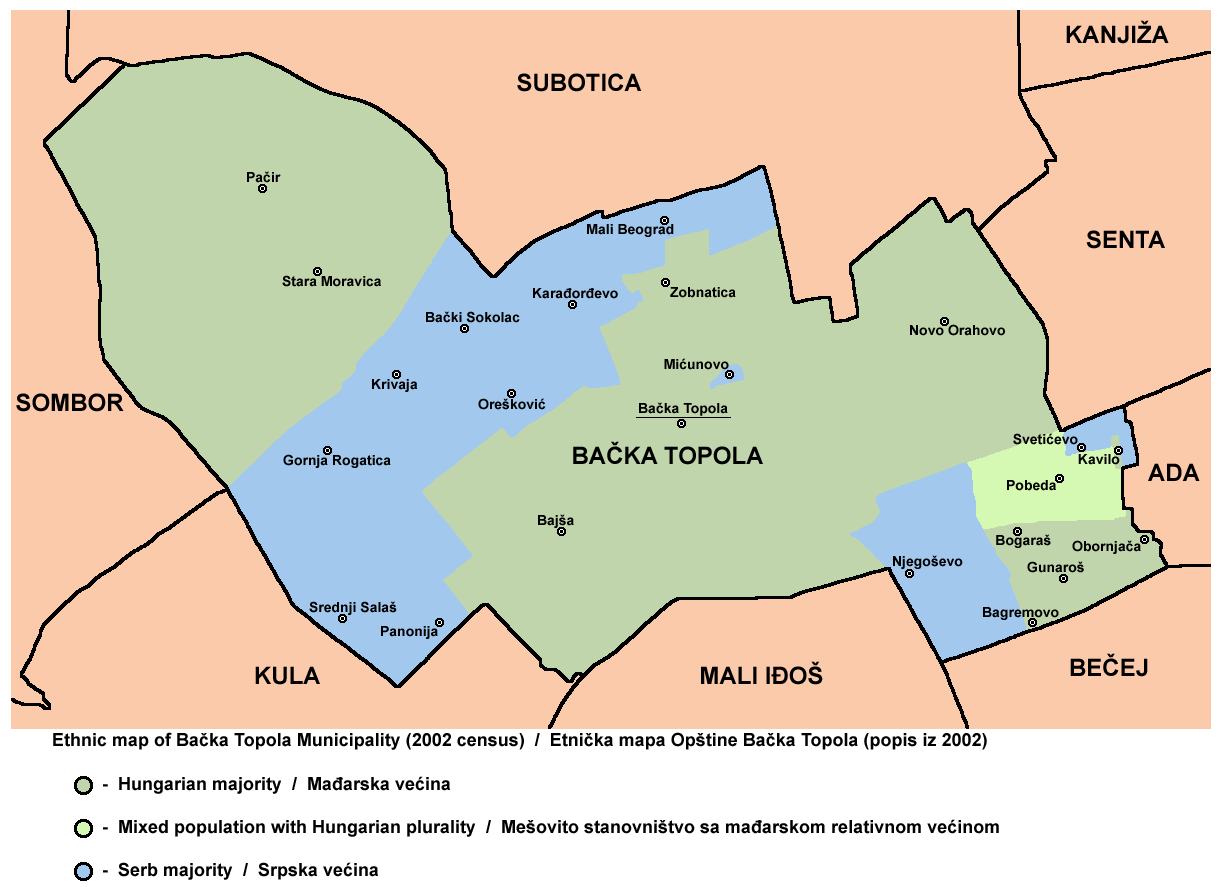
- Map of the Bačka Topola municipality showing the location of Panonija

- Location of Panonija Panonija (Serbia) Panonija (Europe)
- Coordinates: 45°44′N 19°31′E
- Country: Serbia
- Province: Vojvodina
- District: North Bačka District
- Municipality: Bačka Topola
- Time zone: UTC+1 (CET)
  - Summer (DST): UTC+2 (CEST)

Panonija (Serbian Cyrillic: Панонија) is a village in the Bačka Topola municipality, in the North Bačka District of Serbia. It is in the Autonomous Province of Vojvodina. The village has a Serb ethnic majority and at the 2002 census its population was 794.

== Name ==
In Serbian and Croatian the village is known as Panonija (Панонија), in Hungarian as Pannónia. Its name means "Pannonia", and although this name is usually used to designate the ancient Roman province, the modern use of this term also designates the Pannonian plain.

== Historical population ==
- 1981: 877
- 1991: 970

== See also ==
- List of places in Serbia
- List of cities, towns and villages in Vojvodina
