= Ištvan Dudaš =

Serbian footballer

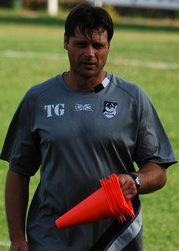

Personal information
- Date of birth: 2 August 1973 (age 53)
- Place of birth: Bačka Topola, SR Serbia, SFR Yugoslavia
- Height: 1.89 m (6 ft 2 1/2 in)
- Position: Goalkeeper

Team information
- Current team: Olympic Charleroi (gk coach)

Youth career
- 1983–1988: Egység Kishegyes
- 1988–1991: AIK Bačka Topola

Senior career*
Years	Team	Apps	(Gls)
1991–1993	Vojvodina		
1993–1995	Szarvas		
1995–1997	Bane		
1997–1999	Hajduk Kula	40	(0)
1999	Lleida	0	(0)
2000–2004	Charleroi	74	(0)
2004–2006	FC Brussels	4	(0)
2006–2008	Olympic Charleroi		

Managerial career
- 2008–2011: Olympic Charleroi (Gk coach)
- 2011–2012: Tubize (Gk coach)
- 2012–2013: La Louvière Centre (Gk coach)
- 2013–?: Olympic Charleroi (Gk coach)
- * Club domestic league appearances and goals

Ištvan Dudaš (Serbian Cyrillic: Иштван Дудаш, Hungarian: Dudás István; born 2 August 1973) is a Serbian retired footballer who played as a goalkeeper.

As a player he had joined Charleroi after an unsuccessful stint at Spanish second-tier outfit Lleida but his stay at Charleroi was marred by injuries.

As a goalkeeper coach he was replaced at Tubize in summer 2012 by Thierry Berghmans.

== Personal life ==
Born in Bačka Topola, SR Serbia, Dudaš is of Hungarian origin and holds a Belgian passport.
