= Mićunovo =

Mićunovo Мићуново (Serbian)
- Village (Selo)
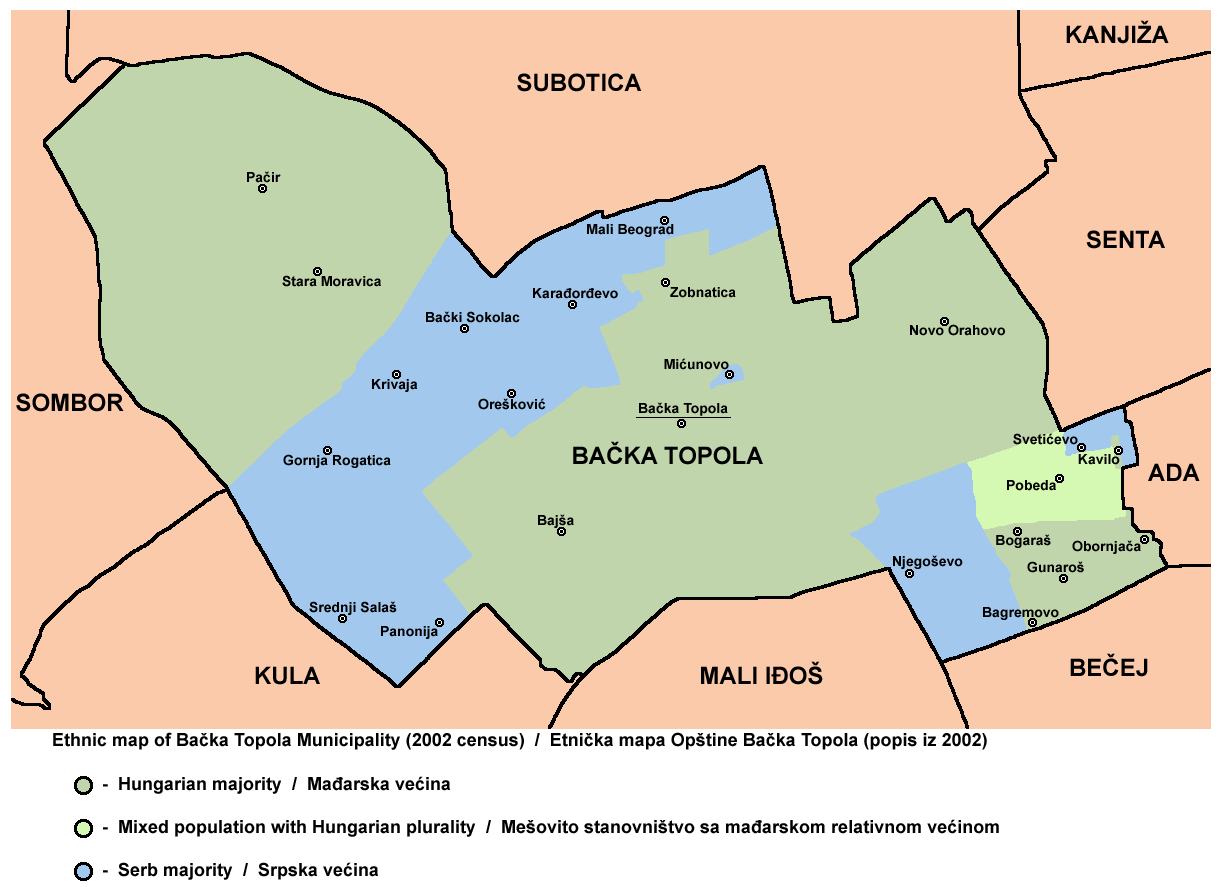
- Map of the Bačka Topola municipality showing the location of Mićunovo

- Location within Vojvodina Location within Serbia Location within Europe
- Coordinates: 45°50′N 19°40′E
- Country: Serbia
- Province: Vojvodina
- District: North Bačka District
- Municipality: Bačka Topola

Population (2002)
  - Total: 516
- Time zone: UTC+1 (CET)
  - Summer (DST): UTC+2 (CEST)

Mićunovo (Serbian Cyrillic: Мићуново) is a village in Serbia. It is situated in the Bačka Topola municipality, in the North Bačka District, Vojvodina province. The village has a Serb ethnic majority and its population numbering 516 people (2002 census).

== Name ==
In Serbian the village is known as Mićunovo (Мићуново), in Hungarian as Karkatúr, and in Croatian as Mićunovo.

== Historical population ==
- 1961: 267
- 1971: 283
- 1981: 304
- 1991: 524
- 2002: 516

== See also ==
- List of places in Serbia
- List of cities, towns and villages in Vojvodina
