= Srednji Salaš =

Srednji Salaš Средњи Салаш (Serbian)
- Village (Selo)
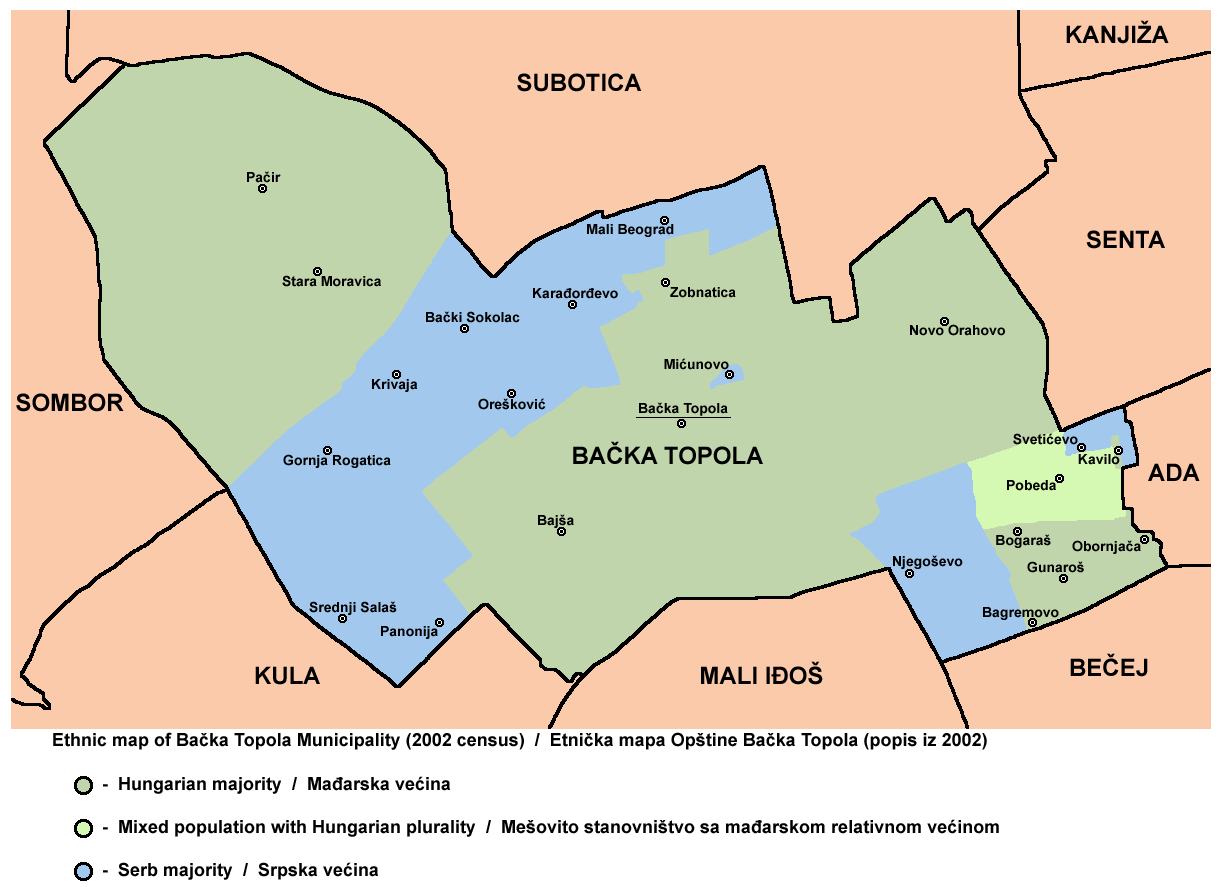
- Map of the Bačka Topola municipality showing the location of Srednji Salaš

- Location within Vojvodina Location within Serbia Location within Europe
- Coordinates: 45°45′N 19°29′E
- Country: Serbia
- Province: Vojvodina
- District: North Bačka District
- Municipality: Bačka Topola

Population (2002)
  - Total: 172
- Time zone: UTC+1 (CET)
  - Summer (DST): UTC+2 (CEST)

Srednji Salaš (Serbian Cyrillic: Средњи Салаш) is a village in Serbia. It is situated in the Bačka Topola municipality, in the North Bačka District, Vojvodina province. The village has a Serb ethnic majority and its population numbering 172 people (2002 census).

== Name ==
In Serbian the village is known as Srednji Salaš (Средњи Салаш), in Croatian as Srednji Salaš, and in Hungarian as Szurkos.

== Historical population ==
- 1961: 266
- 1971: 263
- 1981: 205
- 1991: 183
- 2002: 172

== See also ==
- List of places in Serbia
- List of cities, towns and villages in Vojvodina
