= Pačir =

Pačir Пачир (Serbian) Pacsér (Hungarian)
- Village (Selo)
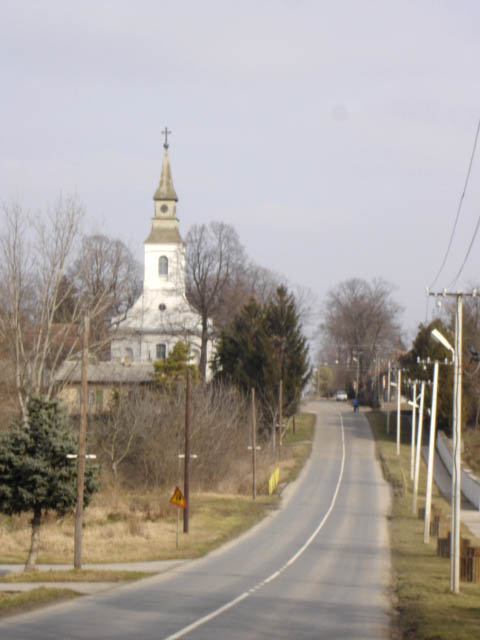
- Main street and the Catholic Church

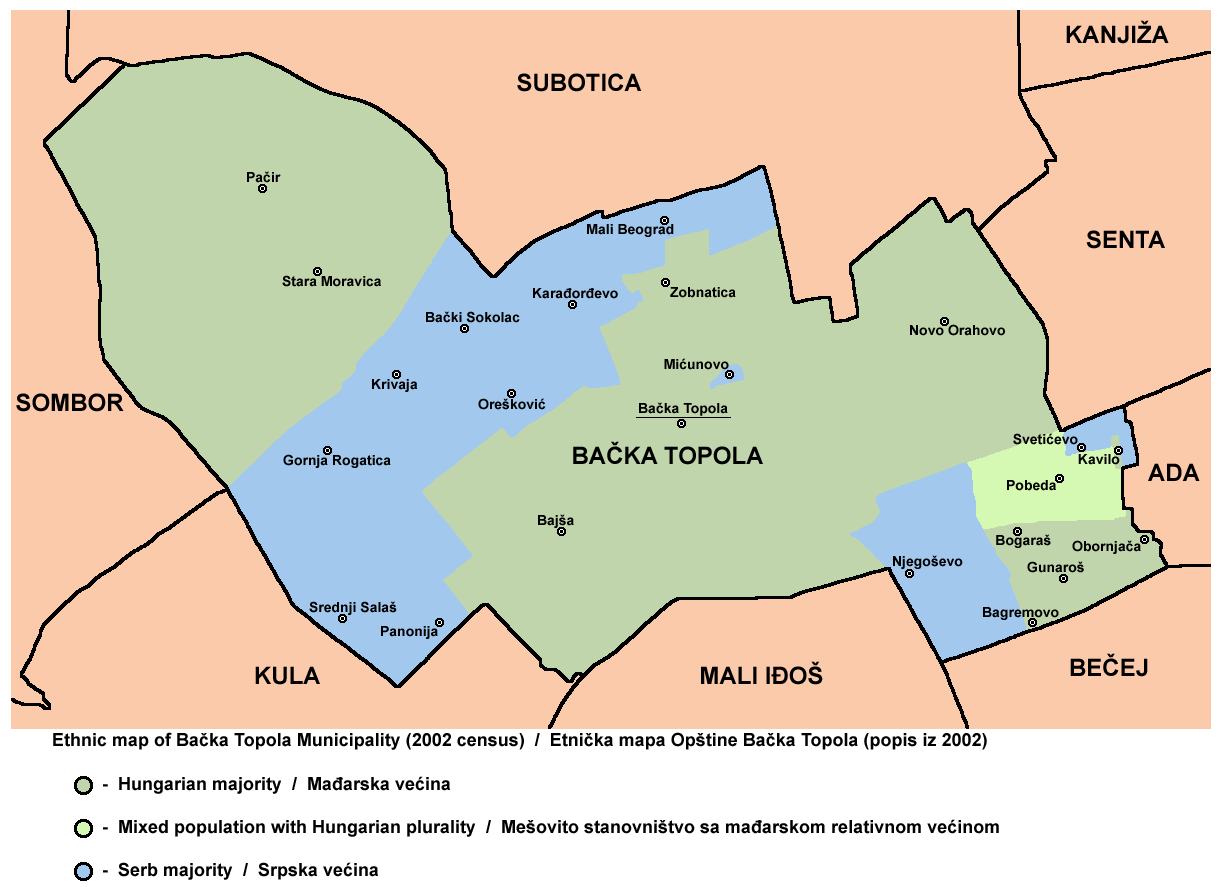
- Map of the Bačka Topola municipality showing the location of Pačir

- Location within Vojvodina Location within Serbia Location within Europe
- Coordinates: 45°54′N 19°26′E
- Country: Serbia
- Province: Vojvodina
- District: North Bačka District
- Municipality: Bačka Topola

Area
  - Total: 77.82 km^{2} (30.05 sq mi)
- Elevation: 114 m (374 ft)

Population (2022)
  - Total: 1,806
  - Density: 23.21/km^{2} (60.11/sq mi)
- Time zone: UTC+1 (CET)
  - Summer (DST): UTC+2 (CEST)

Pačir (Serbian Cyrillic: Пачир: Hungarian: Pacsér, Croatian: Pačir) is a village located in the municipality of Bačka Topola, Serbia. As of 2011 census, the village has 1,806 inhabitants, with Hungarians having the ethnic majority.

== Demographics ==
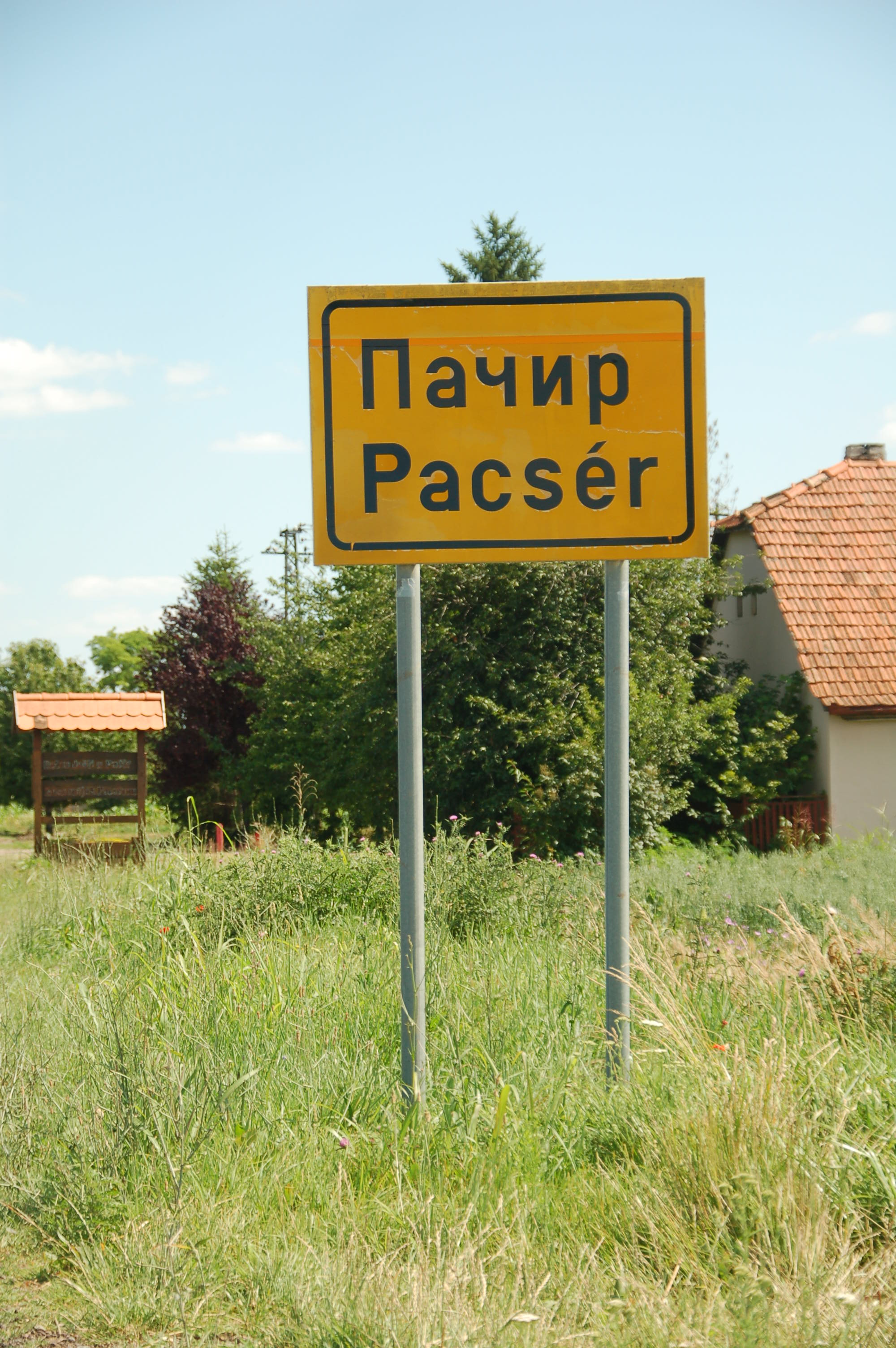
Pacir place-name sign

Historical population
Year	Pop.	±% p.a.
1948	4,907	—
1953	4,806	−0.42%
1961	4,754	−0.14%
1971	4,189	−1.26%
1981	3,871	−0.79%
1991	3,309	−1.56%
2002	2,948	−1.04%
2011	2,580	−1.47%
2022	1,806	−3.19%

=== Ethnic groups ===
The ethnic composition of the village (as of 2022 census):

Ethnicity	Population	Share
Hungarians	1,062	58.8%
Serbs	484	26.8%
Bunjevci	29	1.6%
Roma	24	1.3%
Croats	22	1.2%
Yugoslavs	20	1.1%
Others	8	0.4%
Unknown/Undeclared	150	8.3%

== See also ==
- List of places in Serbia
- List of cities, towns and villages in Vojvodina
