= Zobnatica =

Zobnatica Зобнатица (Serbian) Andrásnépe (Hungarian)
- Village (Selo)
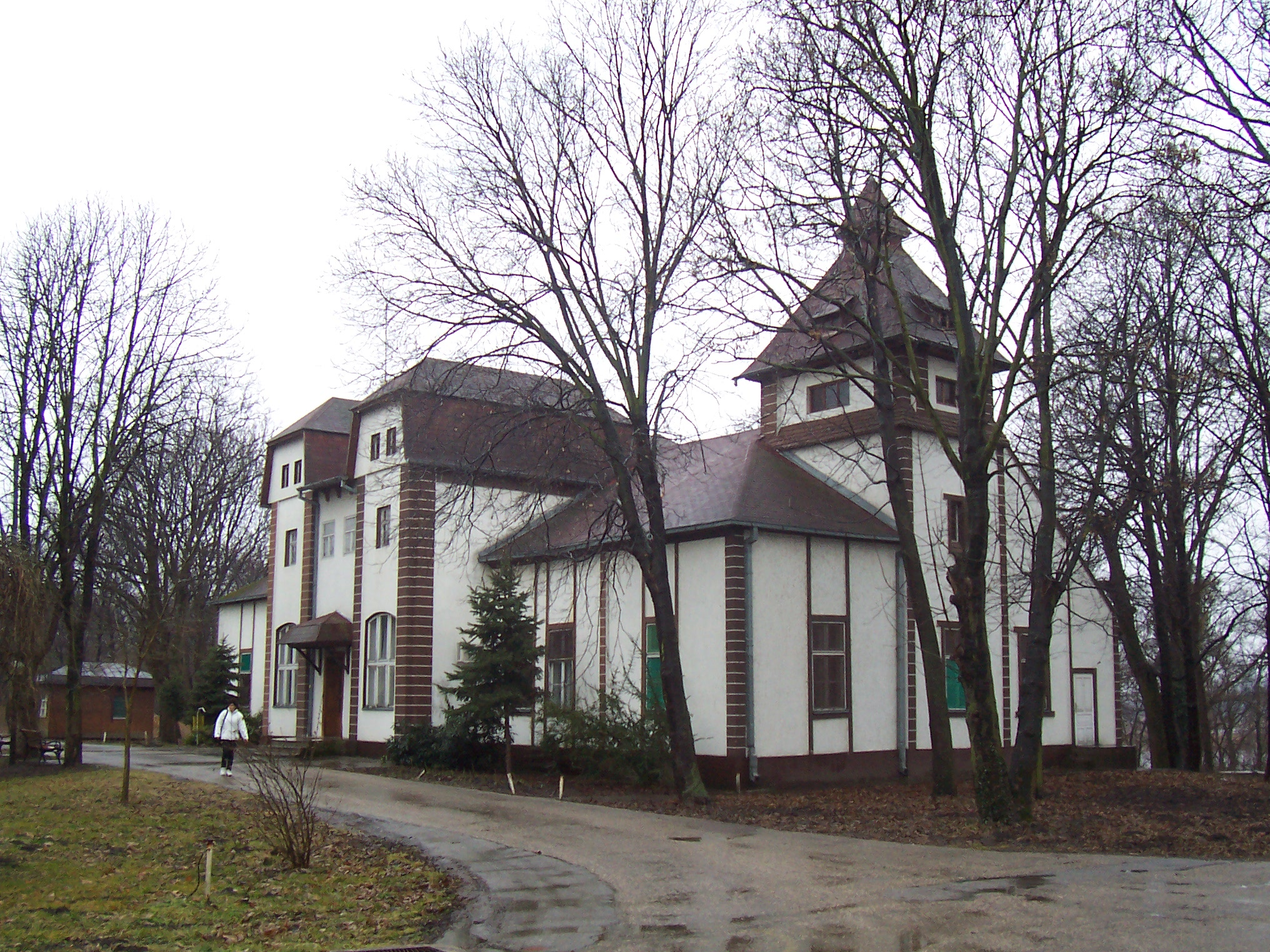
- Zobnatica kaštel (now a hotel)

- Location within Vojvodina Location within Serbia Location within Europe
- Coordinates: 45°52′N 19°38′E
- Country: Serbia
- Province: Vojvodina
- District: North Bačka District
- Municipality: Bačka Topola

Population (2022)
  - Total: 148
- Time zone: UTC+1 (CET)
  - Summer (DST): UTC+2 (CEST)

Zobnatica (Serbian Cyrillic: Зобнатица, Hungarian: Andrásnépe) is a village in northern Vojvodina. It is situated in the Bačka Topola municipality, itself a part of the North Bačka District. The village has a population of 148 people, mostly Hungarians (according to the 2022 census). Zobnatica is also a known and successful horse stable, being the home for several winning horses that achieved success in Yugoslavia and, today, Serbia.

== The Zobnatica stable ==
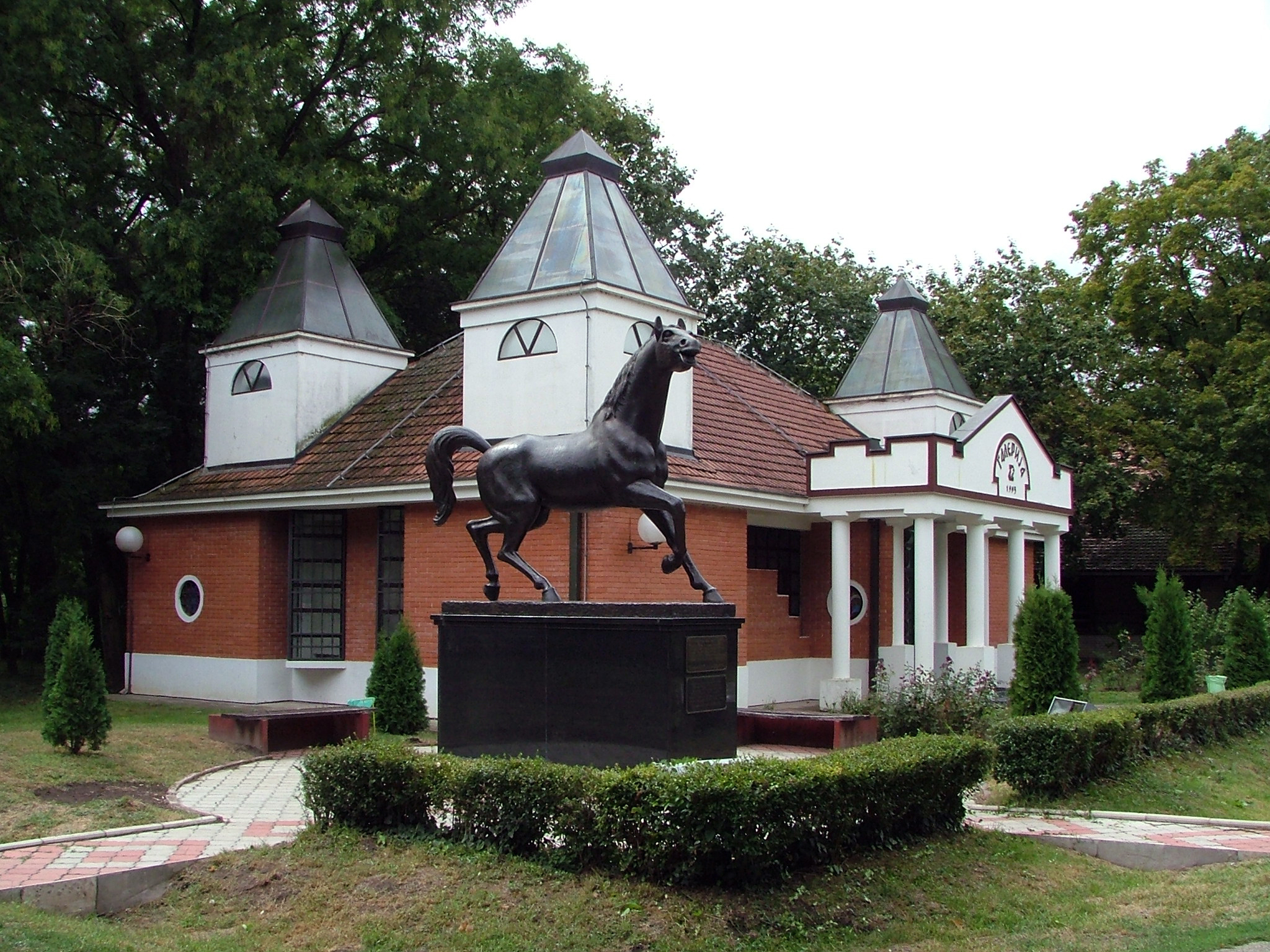
Zobnatica stable

The tradition of horse breeding in the region has lasted continuously for hundreds of years, and Zobnatica has been a known horse breeding place for almost 500 years. The horse farm in Zobnatica was founded in 1779 by Bela Vojnic.

The Zobnatica stable encompasses a hippodrome, stables, a museum, a hotel and a restaurant. It has had a tradition of breeding thoroughbred horses for over two hundred years. The achievements of the Zobnatica horses are held in the museum, which is built in the shape of a horseshoe, and the former family hall now holds the hotel. The former Terlei (Törley) family castle is also a part of the complex.

== Zobnatica lake ==
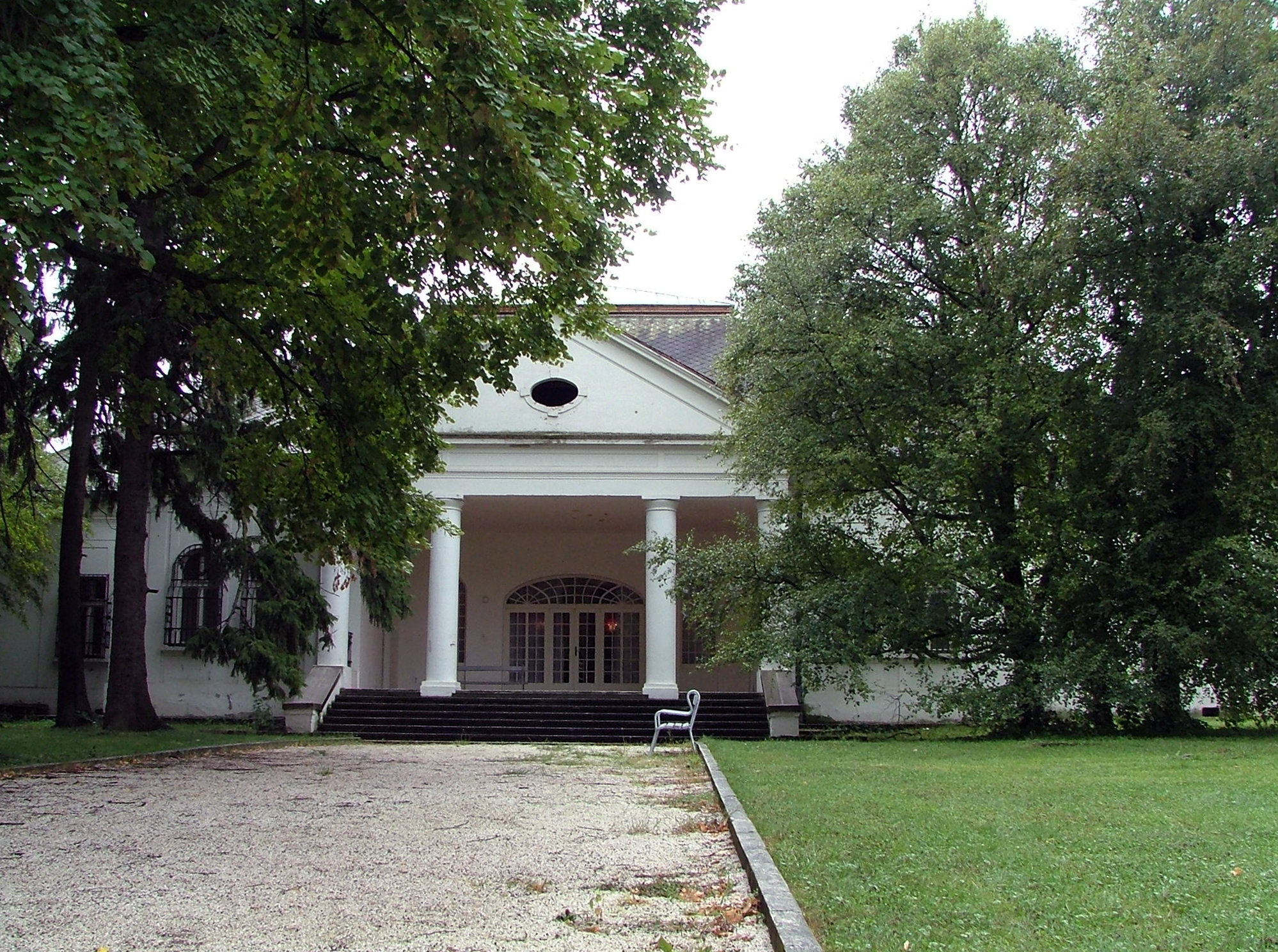
Kastel 1846

Zobnatica Lake was formed in 1976 in the valley of the Krivaja river, covering an area of 226 hectares and stretching about 5 km in length. The lake is a popular local tourist spot. It is a part of the Bačkotopolska Valley Nature Park since 2017.

== See also ==
- List of places in Serbia
- List of cities, towns and villages in Vojvodina
