= Bogaraš (Bačka Topola) =

Bogaraš Богараш (Serbian) Bogaras-Félváros (Hungarian)
- Village (Selo)
- Location within Vojvodina Location within Serbia Location within Europe
- Coordinates: 45°46′42″N 19°48′16″E
- Country: Serbia
- Province: Vojvodina
- District: North Bačka District
- Municipality: Bačka Topola

Population (2022)
  - Total: 436
- Time zone: UTC+1 (CET)
  - Summer (DST): UTC+2 (CEST)

Bogaraš (Serbian Cyrillic: Богараш, Hungarian: Bogaras vagy Félváros) is a village in Serbia. It is situated in the Bačka Topola municipality, in the North Bačka District, Vojvodina province. The village has a Hungarian ethnic majority and its population was 436 as of the 2022 census.

== See also ==
- List of places in Serbia
- List of cities, towns and villages in Vojvodina
