= Bačka Topola =

Bačka Topola Бачка Топола (Serbian) Topolya (Hungarian) Бачка Тополя (Pannonian Rusyn) Báčska Topola (Slovak)
- Town and municipality
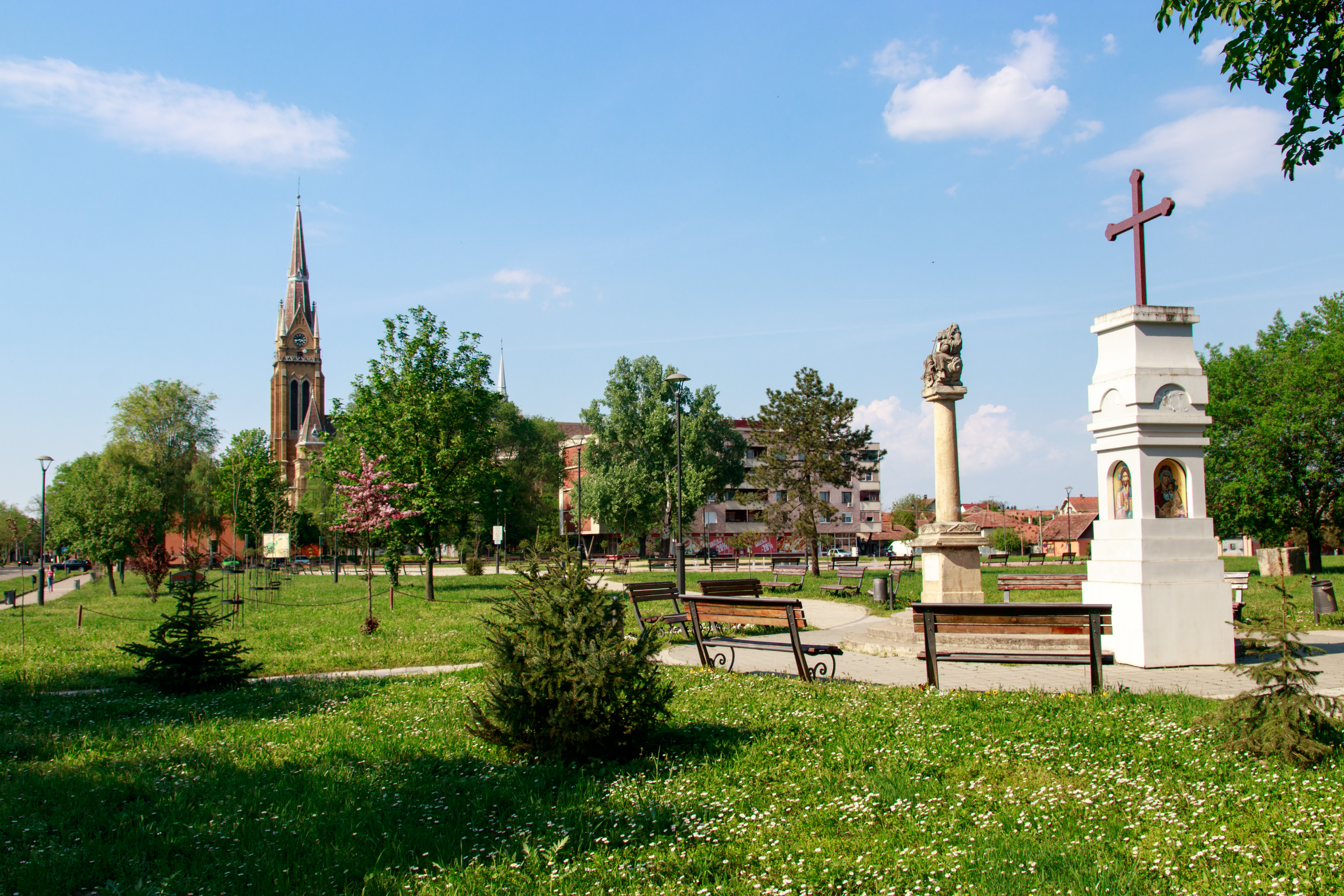
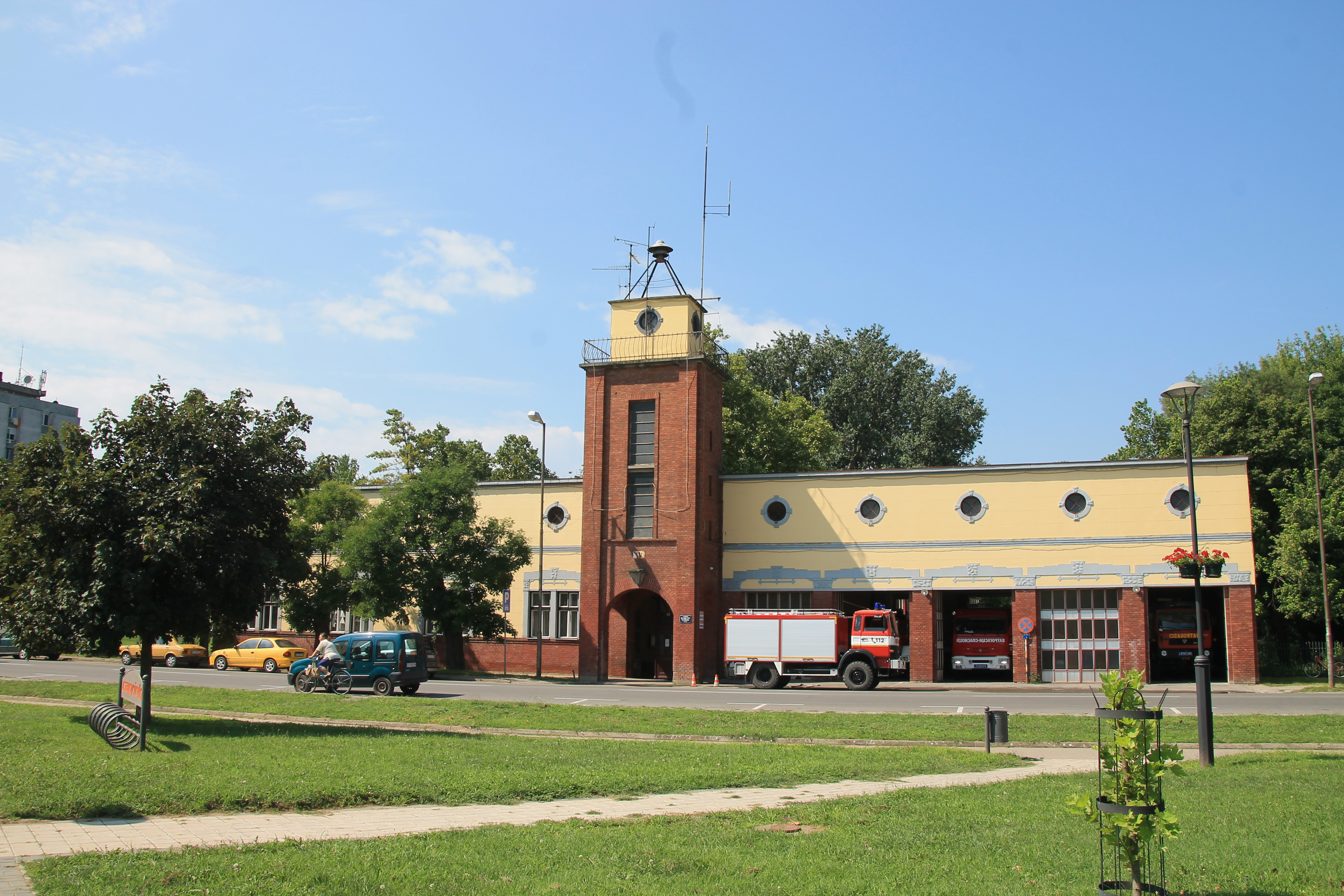
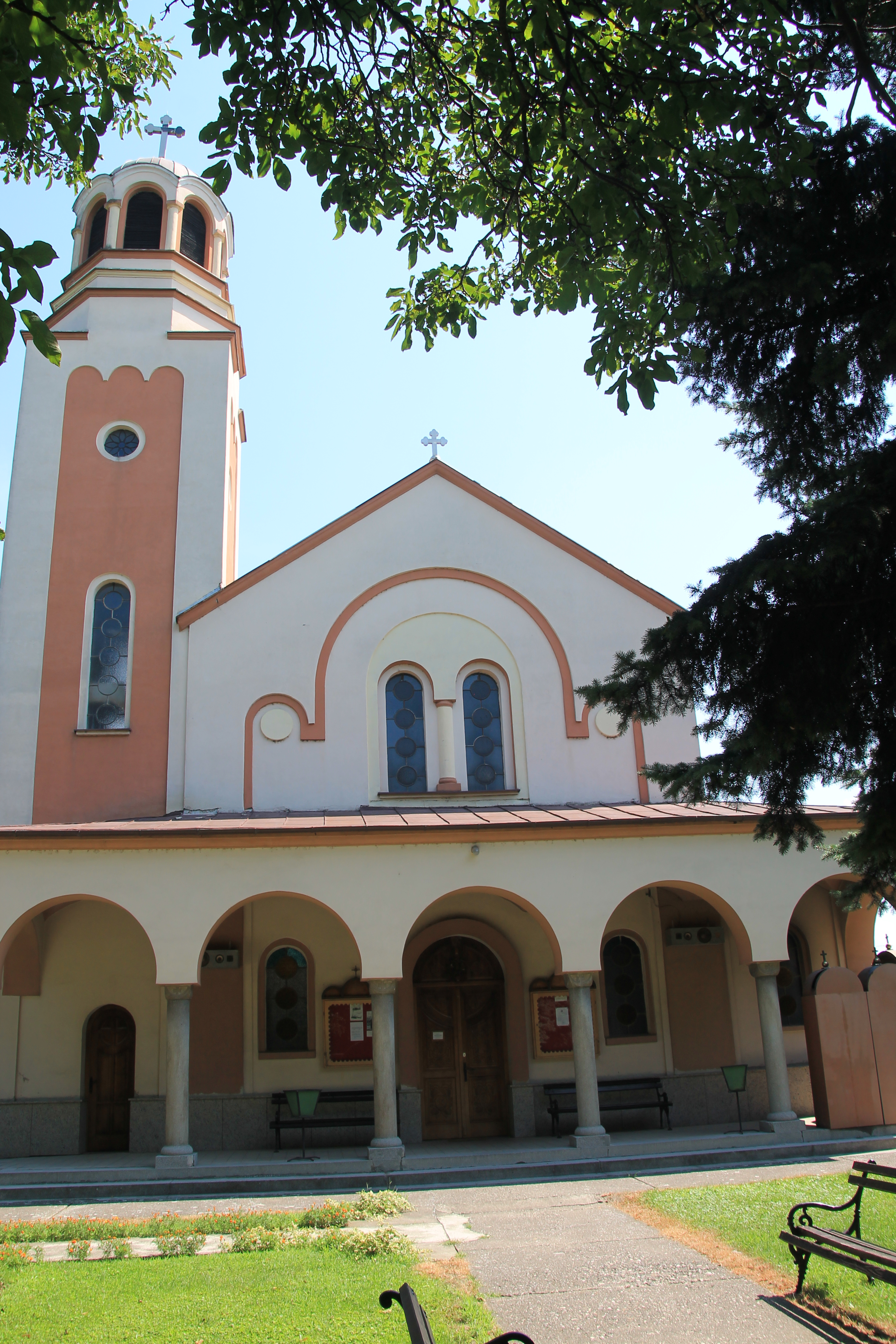
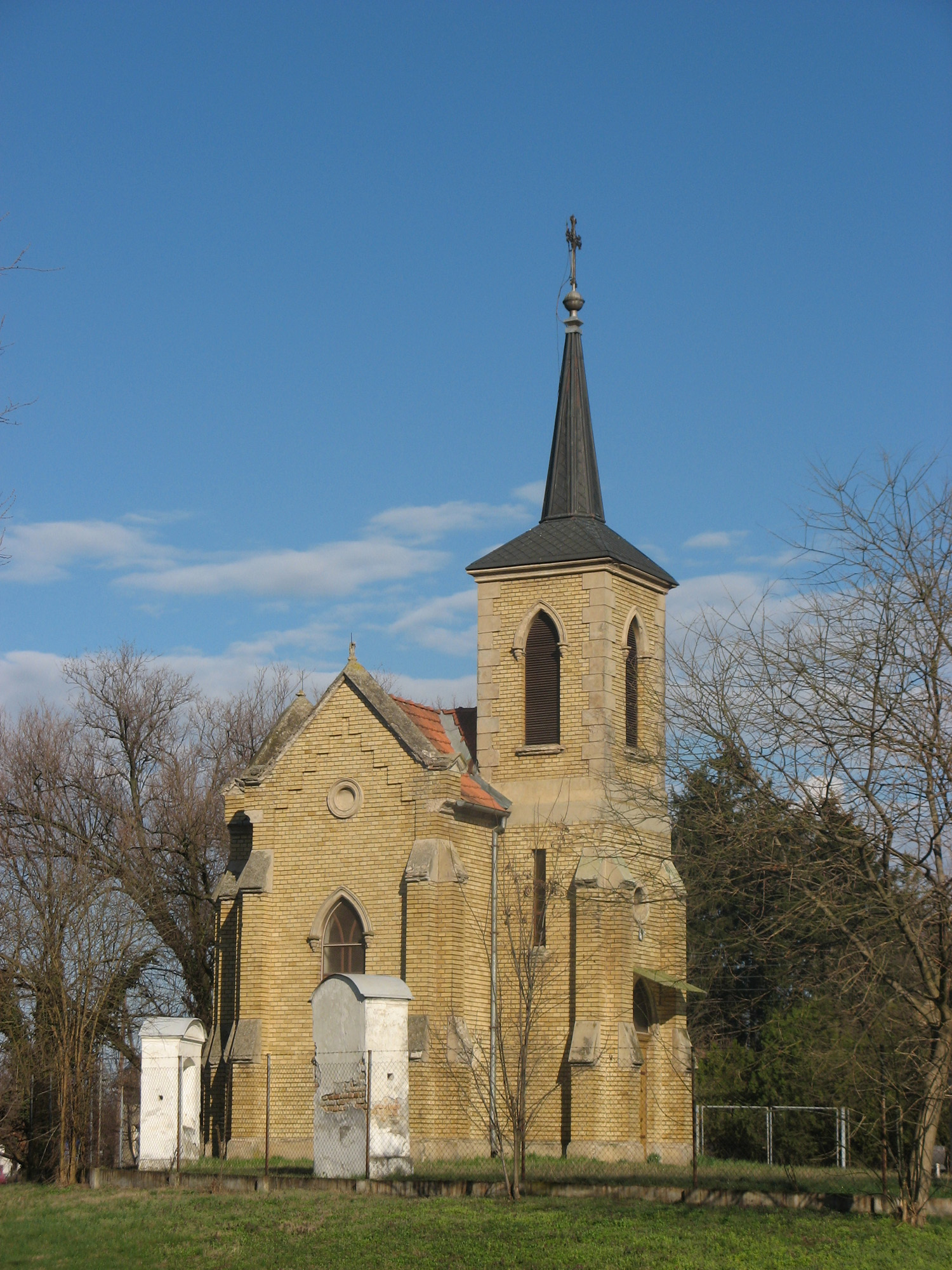
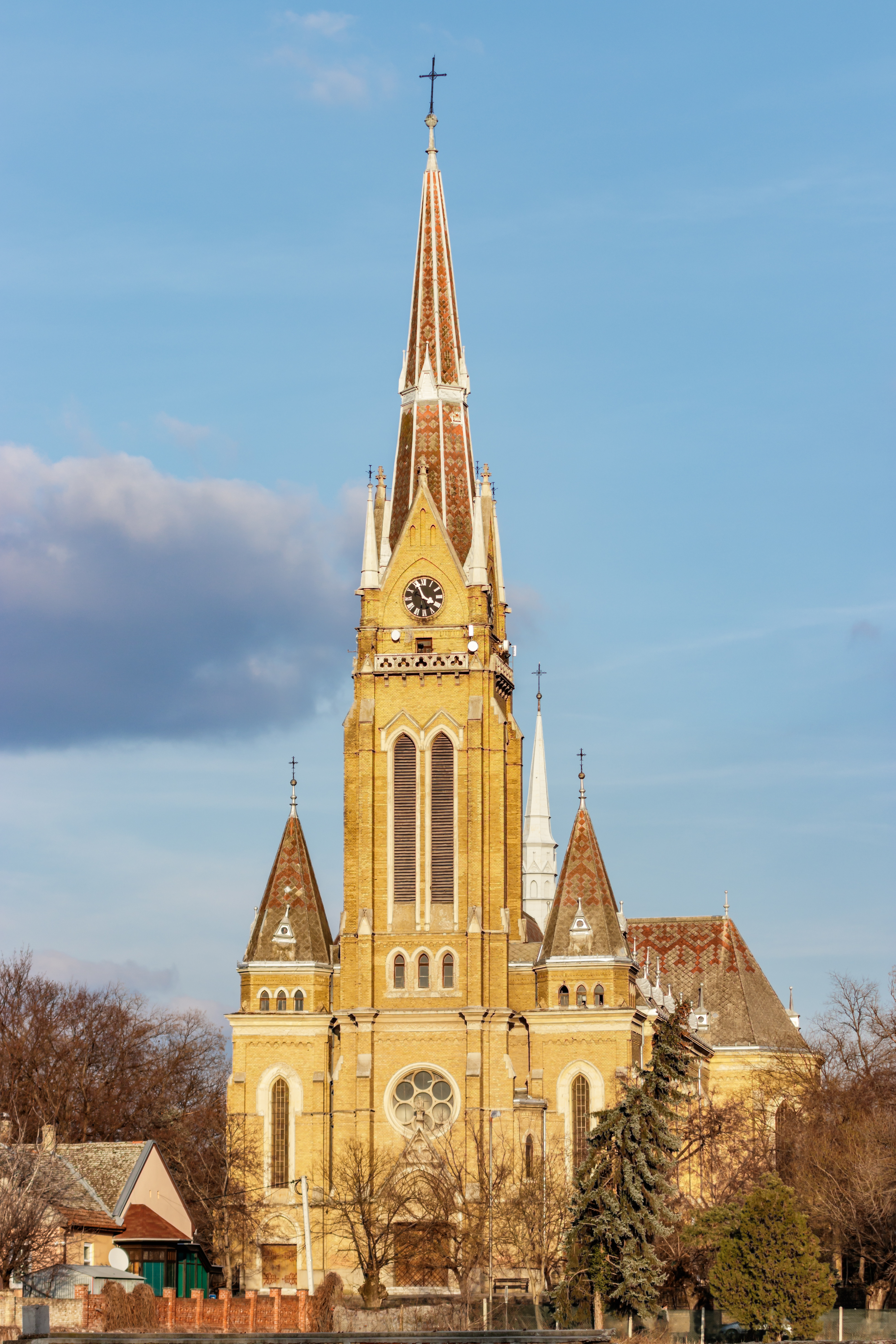
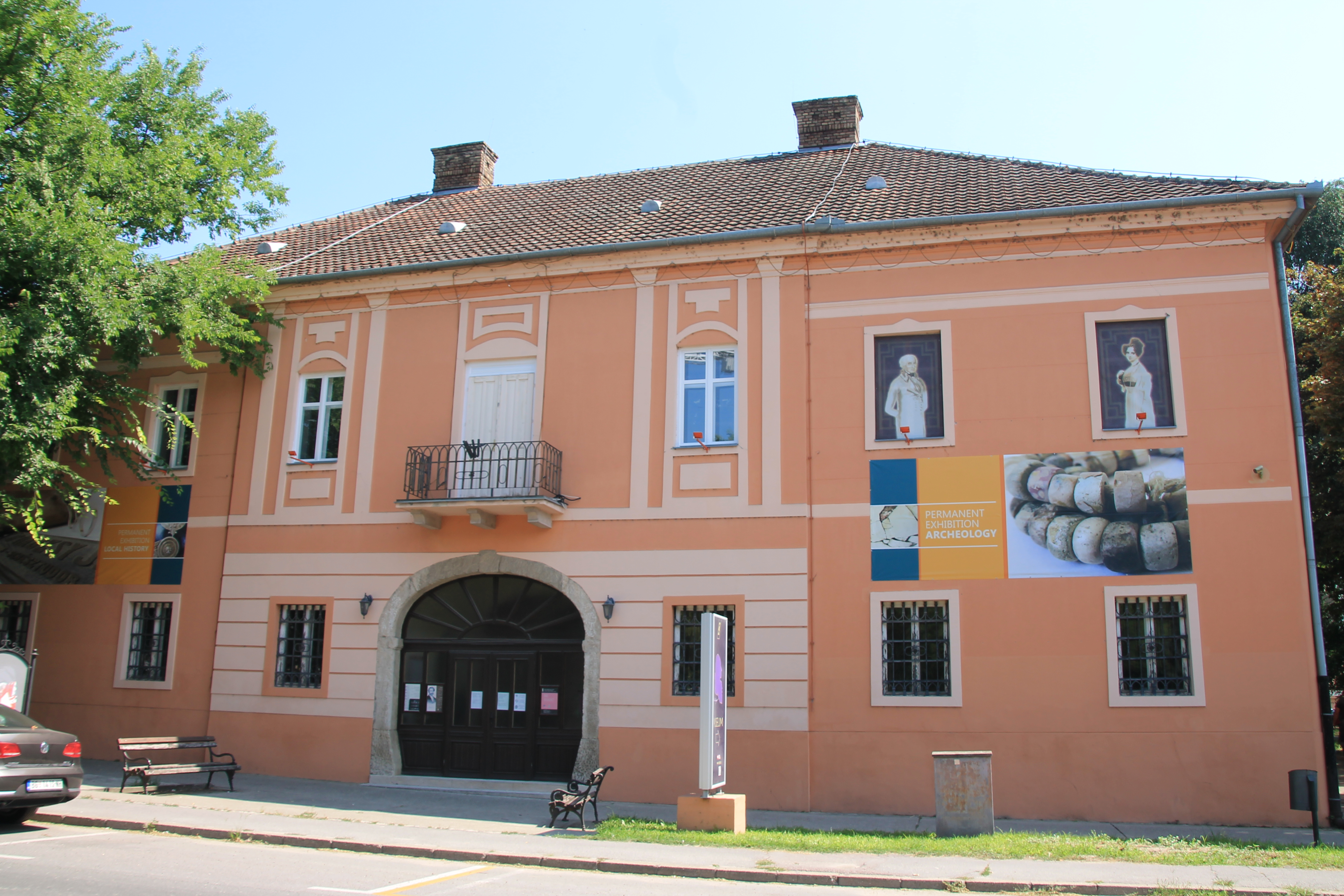
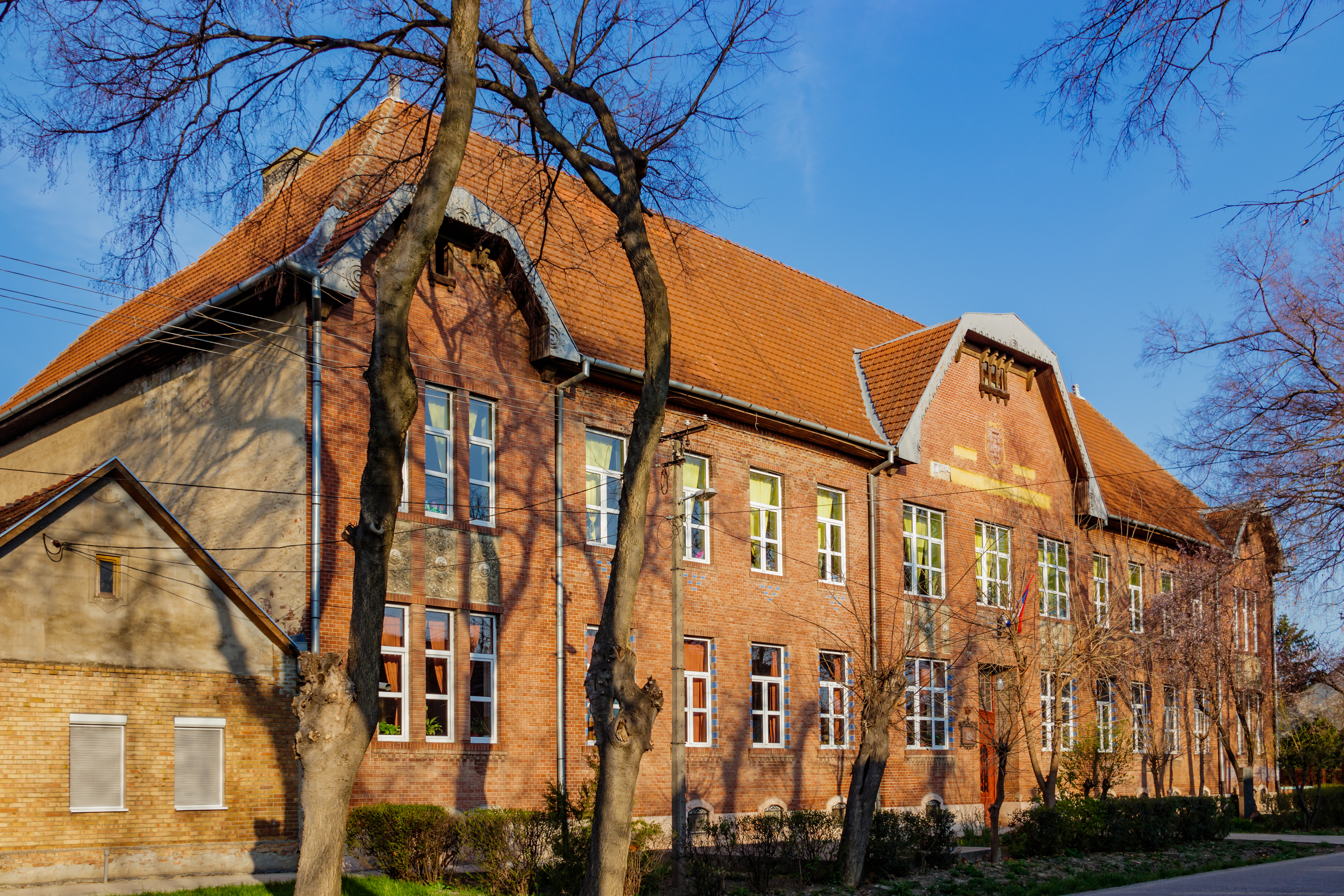
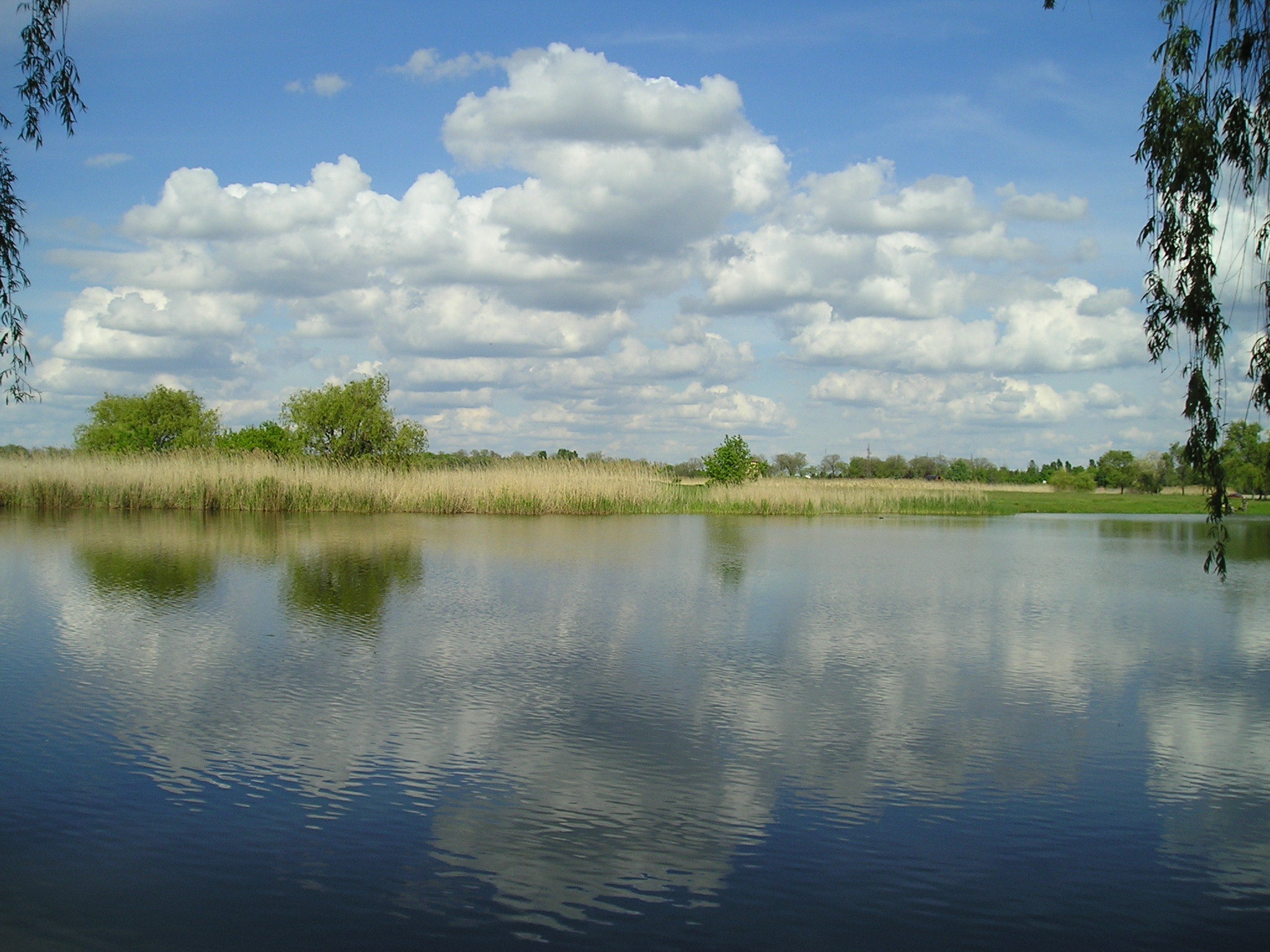
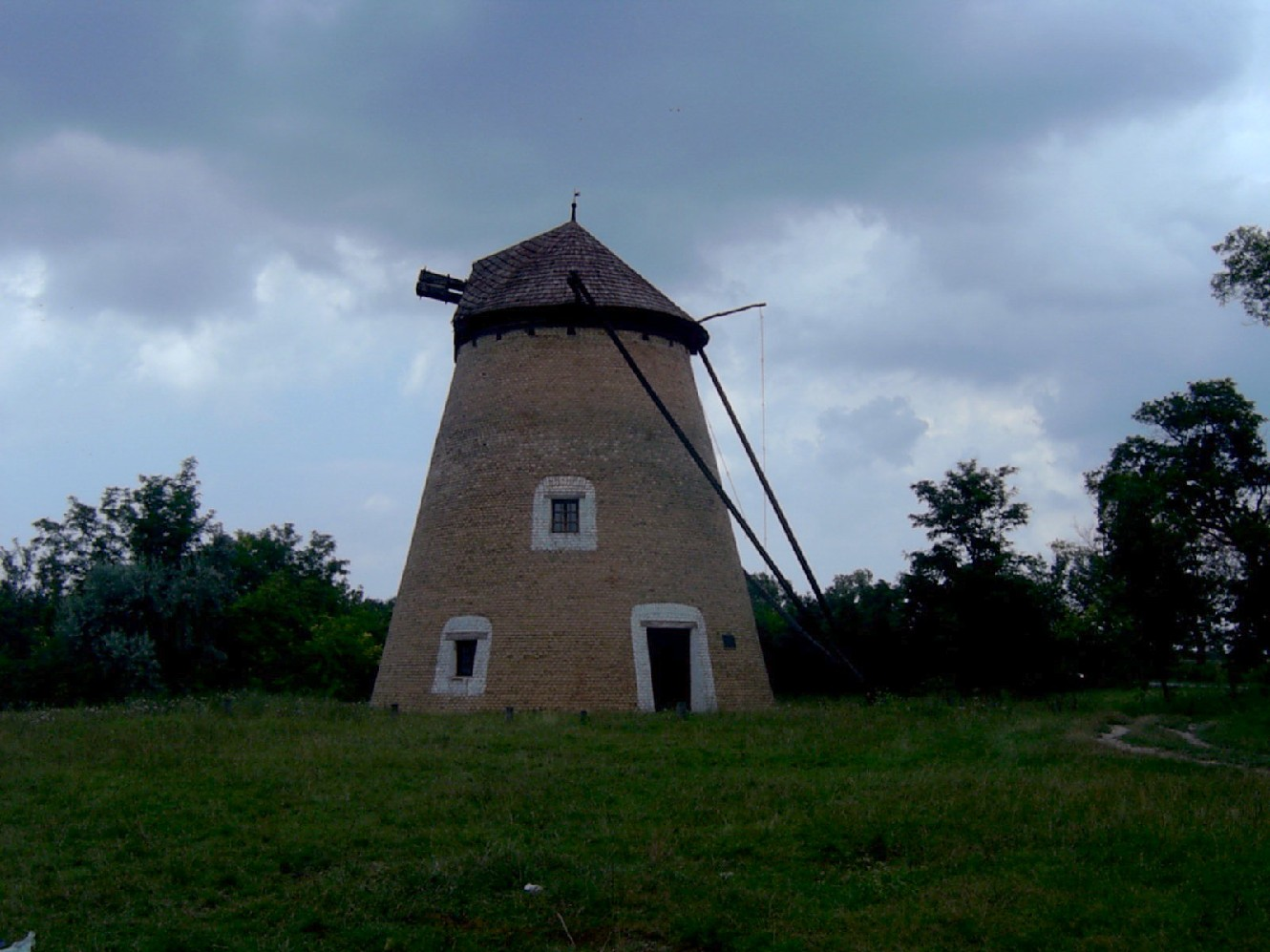
- From top: Main square, Fire station, Serbian Orthodox Church, Calvary, Visitation of Our Lady Catholic Church, Kray castle, Civil Elementary School, Lake, Old Windmill

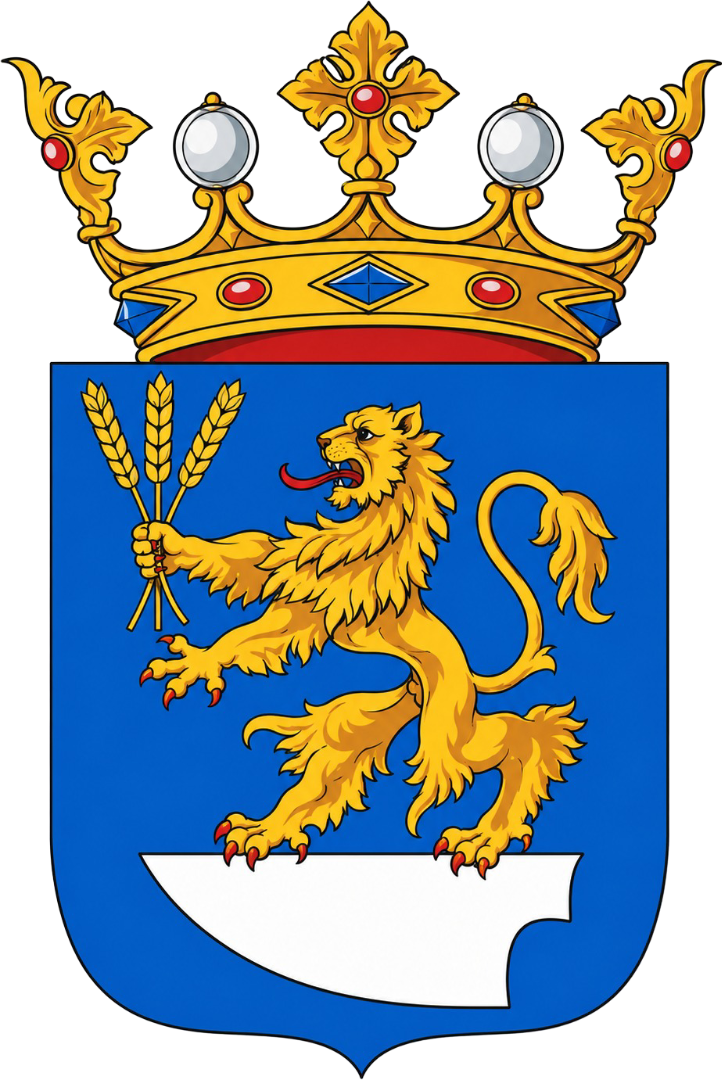
- Coat of arms

- Location of Bačka Topola within Serbia Bačka Topola (Serbia)
- Coordinates: 45°49′N 19°38′E
- Country: Serbia
- Province: Vojvodina
- District: North Bačka
- Settlements: 23

Government
  - Mayor: Adrián Szatmári (SVM)

Area
  - Municipality: 596 km^{2} (230 sq mi)
- Elevation: 102 m (335 ft)

Population (2022 census)
  - Town: 11,930
  - Municipality: 26,228
- Time zone: UTC+1 (CET)
  - Summer (DST): UTC+2 (CEST)
- Postal code: 24300
- Area code: +381 24
- Car plates: BT
- Official languages: Serbian together with Hunagrian, Pannonian Rusyn and Slovak language
- Website: www.btopola.org.rs

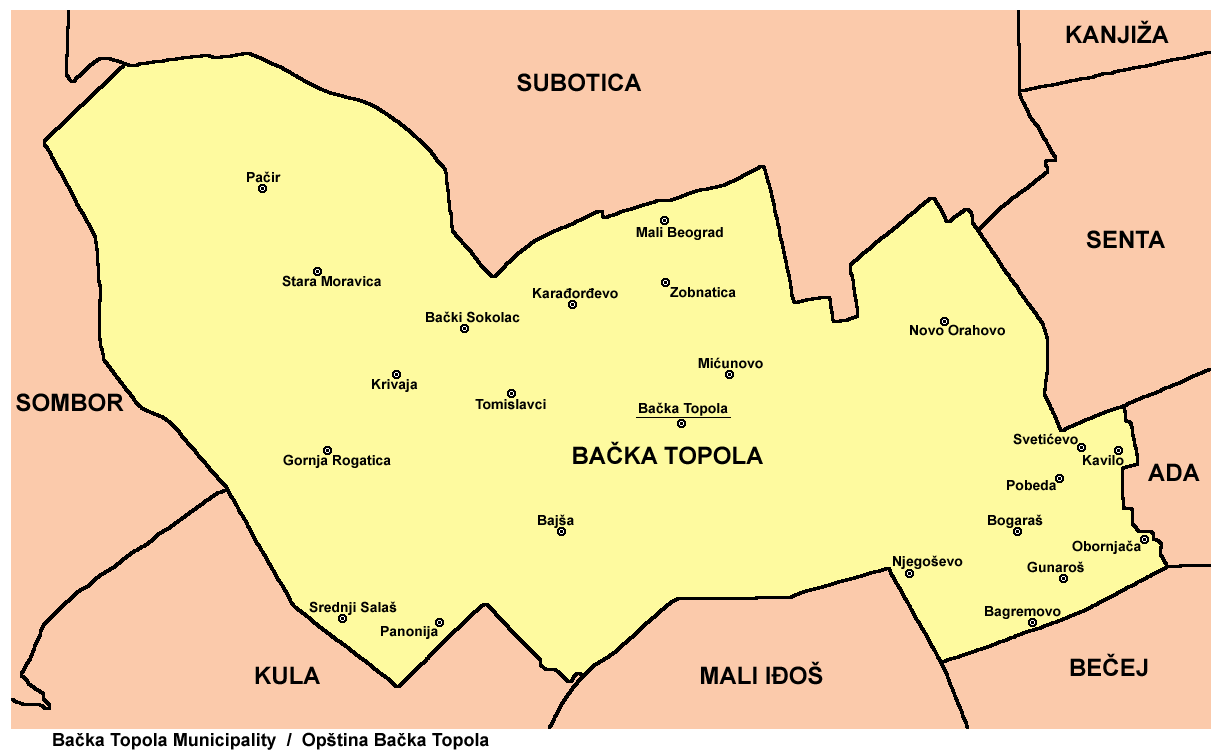
Map of Bačka Topola municipality

Bačka Topola (Serbian: Бачка Топола, pronounced [bâːtʃkaː topǒla]; Hungarian: Topolya, pronounced [ˈtopojɒ]) is a town and municipality located in the North Bačka District, Vojvodina, Serbia. The municipality is composed of 23 local communities and, according to the 2022 census, has population of 26,228 while the town itself has 11,930 inhabitants. Four official languages are used in the municipality: Serbian, Hungarian, Rusyn, and Slovak.

== Name ==
The name of the town is derived from the Serbian word topola (топола) ("poplar" in English). The first part of the name of the town was given to designate its location in the region of Bačka in contrast to places with similar names, like Topola in Šumadija or Banatska Topola in Banat.

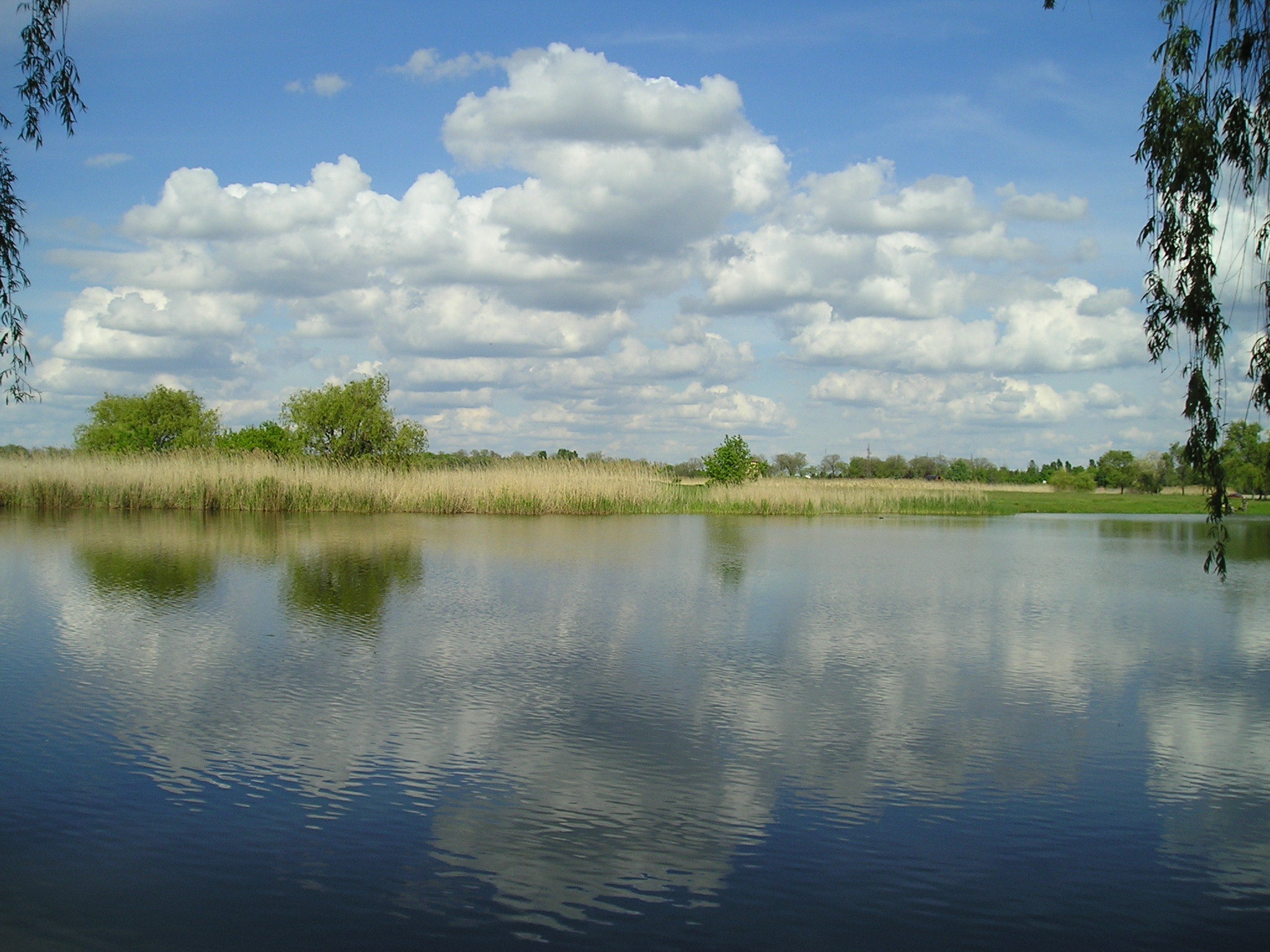
The lake

== History ==
The town was mentioned first in 1462 under name Fibaych. This settlement was a part of the Kingdom of Hungary, and was inhabited by Hungarians in the middle ages. The village was destroyed in the 16th century and new smaller settlement was later built at its location. Name Topola was first recorded in 1543, while according to the Ottoman defters from 1580, 1582, and 1590, it was mentioned as a village, whose population numbered between 21 and 23 houses. At this time, the inhabitants of the settlement were Serbs. In 1704, Topola was destroyed by kuruc rebels.

In 1731, Topola was mentioned as an uninhabited heath. In 1750, the new settlement was founded at this location and 200 Hungarian and Slovak families arrived here from Upper Hungary. The period of historical improvement starts in 1803 with the arrival of Krai family, who built their castle, planted a park, and bred horses and greyhounds. The development was abruptly interrupted by the upheaval of 1849. In the late 19th century the town recovered, and the prominent Church of the Immaculate Virgin Mary was completed in 1906.

It was a district center in Bács-Bodrog County as "Topolya" until 1918, when it became part of Kingdom of Serbs, Croats and Slovenes (renamed to Yugoslavia in 1929). It was part of Yugoslavia until 1991, with the exception of Hungarian occupation between 1941 and 1944 during World War II.

In 2026, the Republic of Ireland national football team chose this town as their "home" venue for their 2026-27 UEFA Nations League fixture against Israel.

== Inhabited places ==
Bačka Topola municipality includes the town of Bačka Topola and the following villages:

- Bagremovo (Hungarian: Brazília or Bárdossyfalva)
- Bački Sokolac
- Bajša (Hungarian: Bajsa)
- Bogaraš (Hungarian: Bodaras or Félváros)
- Gornja Rogatica
- Gunaroš (Hungarian: Gunaras)
- Karađorđevo
- Kavilo (Hungarian: Rákócitelep or Kavilló)
- Krivaja
- Mali Beograd
- Mićunovo
- Njegoševo
- Novo Orahovo (Hungarian: Zentagunaras)
- Obornjača (Hungarian: Nagyvölgy)
- Pačir (Hungarian: Pacsér)
- Panonija
- Pobeda (Hungarian: Győztes)
- Srednji Salaš
- Stara Moravica (Hungarian: Bácskossuthfalva)
- Svetićevo
- Tomislavci
- Zobnatica (Hungarian: Andrásnépe)

Note: For the inhabited places with an absolute or relative Hungarian ethnic majority, the names are also given in Hungarian.

== Demographics ==
Historical population
Year	Pop.	±% p.a.
1948	43,135	—
1953	43,243	+0.05%
1961	44,466	+0.35%
1971	43,508	−0.22%
1981	41,889	−0.38%
1991	40,473	−0.34%
2002	38,245	−0.51%
2011	33,321	−1.52%
2022	26,228	−2.15%

According to the 2022 census results, the municipality of Bačka Topola has a population of 26,228 inhabitants.

=== Ethnic groups ===
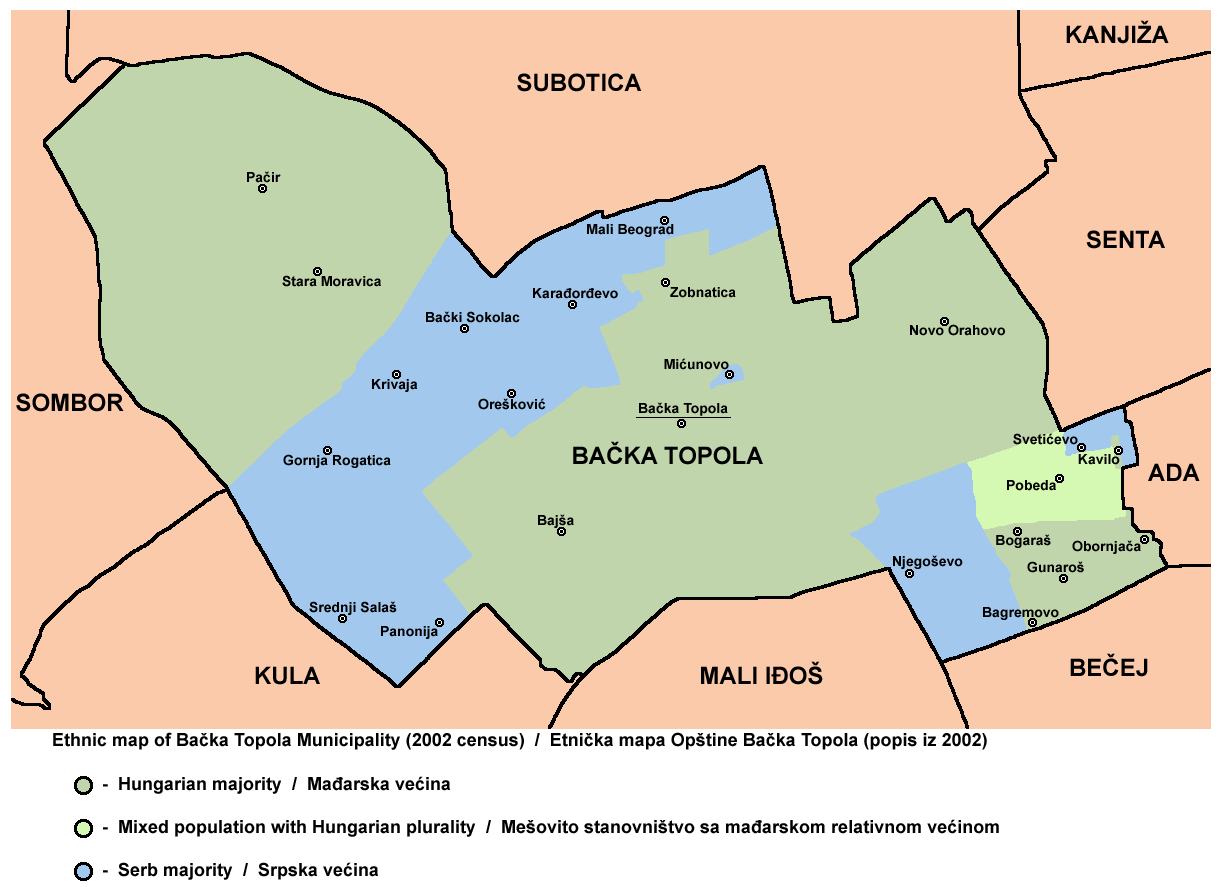
Ethnic map of the Bačka Topola municipality

Local communities with a Hungarian majority are: Bačka Topola (Hungarian: Topolya), Bajša (Hungarian: Bajsa), Pačir (Hungarian: Pacsér), Stara Moravica (Hungarian: Bácskossuthfalva), Zobnatica (Hungarian: Andrásnépe), Bogaraš (Hungarian: Bogaras-Felváros), Obornjača (Hungarian: Nagyvölgy), Bagremovo (Hungarian: Brazília), Gunaroš (Hungarian: Gunaras), Novo Orahovo (Hungarian: Zentagunaras), and Kavilo (Hungarian: Rákóczifalu or Kavilló).

Local communities with a Serb majority are: Gornja Rogatica, Srednji Salaš, Panonija, Orešković, Bački Sokolac, Karađorđevo, Mićunovo, Njegoševo, Krivaja, Svetićevo, and Mali Beograd.

Pobeda (Hungarian: Győztes or Pobedabirtok) is an ethnically-mixed local community with a Hungarian relative majority. Krivaja, Mali Beograd, and Svetićevo have over 20% Hungarians, as well as other minorities, while Bačka Topola, Pačir, Zobnatica, and Pobeda have over 20% Serbs.

The ethnic composition of the municipality:

Ethnic group	Population	Proportion
Hungarians	14,599	55.6%
Serbs	8,185	31.2%
Yugoslavs	234	0.9%
Montenegrins	205	0.8%
Croats	193	0.7%
Roma	177	0.7%
Rusyns	144	0.5%
Bunjevci	108	0.4%
Slovaks	79	0.3%
Albanians	57	0.2%
Unknown	842	3.2%
Others	1,405	5.3%
Total	26,228	

== Economy ==
The following table gives a preview of total number of employed people per their core activity (as of 2016):

Activity	Total
Agriculture, forestry and fishing	1,142
Mining	-
Processing industry	2,346
Distribution of power, gas and water	44
Distribution of water and water waste management	83
Construction	158
Wholesale and retail, repair	993
Traffic, storage and communication	205
Hotels and restaurants	166
Media and telecommunications	93
Finance and insurance	110
Property stock and charter	7
Professional, scientific, innovative and technical activities	195
Administrative and other services	115
Administration and social assurance	340
Education	598
Healthcare and social work	486
Art, leisure and recreation	59
Other services	112
Total	7,253

== Culture ==
The Museum of Bačka Topola is located in a historic baroque castle, dating back from the 1810s. The lower floor contains a permanent exhibit about notable local residents.

The Cultural Center of Bačka Topola hosts theater plays, music performances, and other events, in Hungarian and Serbian languages. The Carnival of Honey is a major cultural event with thousands of attendees, held in September.

== Sport ==
The most popular local football team is TSC Bačka Topola, which plays in the Serbian SuperLiga (1st national tier). Founded in 1913, it is one of the oldest football teams in the region.

== Notable people ==
- Branko Bošković former football player
- Andrija Kaluđerović football player
- Félix Lajkó violinist, zither player, composer, movie actor
- Nikola Žigić former football player
- György Mezey former football player and manager
- Branislav Simić Greco-Roman wrestler, Olympic champion
- Eleonora Wild former basketball player, Olympic and World Championship silver medalist
- István Dudás former football player
- Paul Kray soldier
- Dušan Tadić football player

== International relations ==
=== Twin towns — Sister cities ===
Bačka Topola is twinned with:

- Belváros-Lipótváros, Hungary
- Gheorgheni, Romania
- Kiskunmajsa, Hungary
- Rožňava, Slovakia
- Szentes, Hungary
- Taksony, Hungary

== See also ==
- List of cities, towns and villages in Vojvodina
- List of Hungarian communities in Serbia
- List of places in Serbia
