= Radivoj =

Radivoj (Serbian Cyrillic: Радивој) is a Serbian given name. Notable people with the name include:

- Radivoj Berbakov (1925–2003), Serbian painter
- Radivoj Korać (1938–1969), Yugoslav basketball player
- Radivoj Lazić (born 1953), Serbian musician
- Radivoj Radić (born 1954), Serbian historian
