= List of tumuli in Serbia =

This is a detailed list of tumuli (barrows) in Serbia, ranging from the prehistoric times to the Middle Ages.

- Mrčajevci, several prehistoric tumuli
- Bukovac, Illyrian tumuli and necropolis
- Five prehistoric tumuli in the Morava valley.
- Serbian tumuli in Ravna Gora.
- Kinđa
