= Bosiljka Srdić =

Serbian politician

Bosiljka Srdić (Serbian Cyrillic: Босиљка Срдић; born 1958) is a politician in Serbia. She has served in the National Assembly of Serbia since October 2020 as a member of the Serbian Progressive Party.

== Private career ==
Srdić has a bachelor's degree in political science. She lives in Kikinda.

== Politician ==
=== Municipal politics ===
Srdić is the vice-present of the Progressive Party's city board in Kikinda. She was given the thirty-sixth position (out of thirty-nine) on the party's electoral list for the Kikinda municipal assembly in the 2012 Serbian local elections. The list won twelve mandates, and she was not returned.

She was promoted to the fourth position for the 2016 local elections and was elected when the list won a majority victory with twenty-six mandates. From 2016 to 2020, Srdić served as the city's deputy mayor. She received the fifteenth position on the party's list in the 2020 local elections and was elected to a second term when the list won an increased majority with twenty-eight mandates.

=== Parliamentarian ===
Srdić was awarded the 194th position on the Progressive Party's Aleksandar Vučić — For Our Children list for the 2020 Serbian parliamentary election and narrowly missed direct election when the list won a landslide majority with 188 of 250 mandates. She received a mandate on 28 October 2020 as the replacement for another party member. Srdić is a member of the parliamentary friendship groups with France, Italy, Norway, Russia, and Spain.
