= Suvača =

Flour mill in Kikinda, Serbia

- Сувача
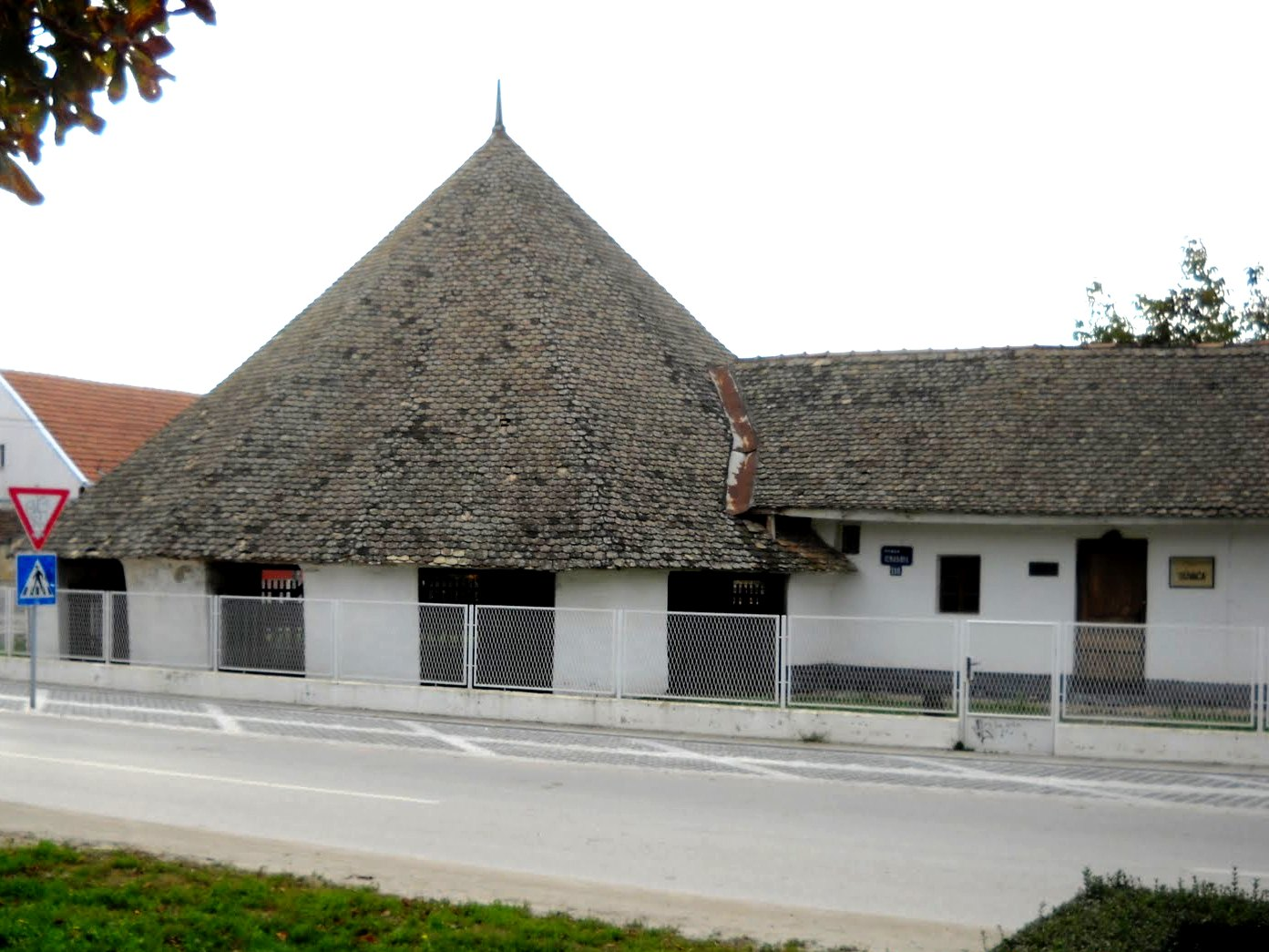
- View of the Suvača horse mill, Kikinda, Serbia

- Location in Serbia
- Location: Kikinda, Serbia
- Coordinates: 45.824145°N 20.453153°E
- Altitude: 83 metres (272 ft)

Construction
- Completed: 1899
- Renovated: 1990
- Height: 8.55 metres (28.1 ft)
- Other dimensions: 15 metres (49 ft)

Equipment

Cultural Heritage of Serbia
- Type: Cultural Monument of Exceptional Importance
- Designated: 1951
- Reference no.: СК 1028

Suvača (Serbian Cyrillic: Сувача) in Kikinda, Serbia, is one of the three remaining horse-powered dry mills in the whole of Europe.

Suvača in Kikinda is characteristic of the Vojvodina area of the 19th century. It was built in 1899, and the mill stopped working in 1945. It is located in the western part of town, on the corner of Nemanjina and Moravska streets. The plot of land is 728 square metres (7,840 sq ft). Suvača is a mill for grinding grain that uses the work of horses as its driving force. The mill uses one to five pairs of horses. One pair of horses was able to grind up to 100 kilograms (220 lb) of grain per hour. According to tradition, the taste of bread from wheat ground in Suvača was excellent and high quality. In addition to cereals, the mill at Suvača would process black pepper, cinnamon, and sweet and hot peppers.

== History ==
Horse powered mills were once numerous in the area. Town of Kikinda itself had 17 of them in 1781, 32 in 1801, and 51 in 1847, which was a record. Building of the mill was finished in 1899. At the time, it was the largest of its type in Austro-Hungary. The quality of the flour grinded in the mill was of such quality, that the flour was sent to the imperial court in Vienna. On the eve of World War II, it was sold to Gašpar Krimer, a German, but was nationalized after the war, in 1945.

Today, there are only three horse powered mills surviving in Europe, the other two being in Szarvas, Hungary and Otok, Croatia. Being the only one in Serbia, Suvača is a unique architectural monument.

== Architecture ==
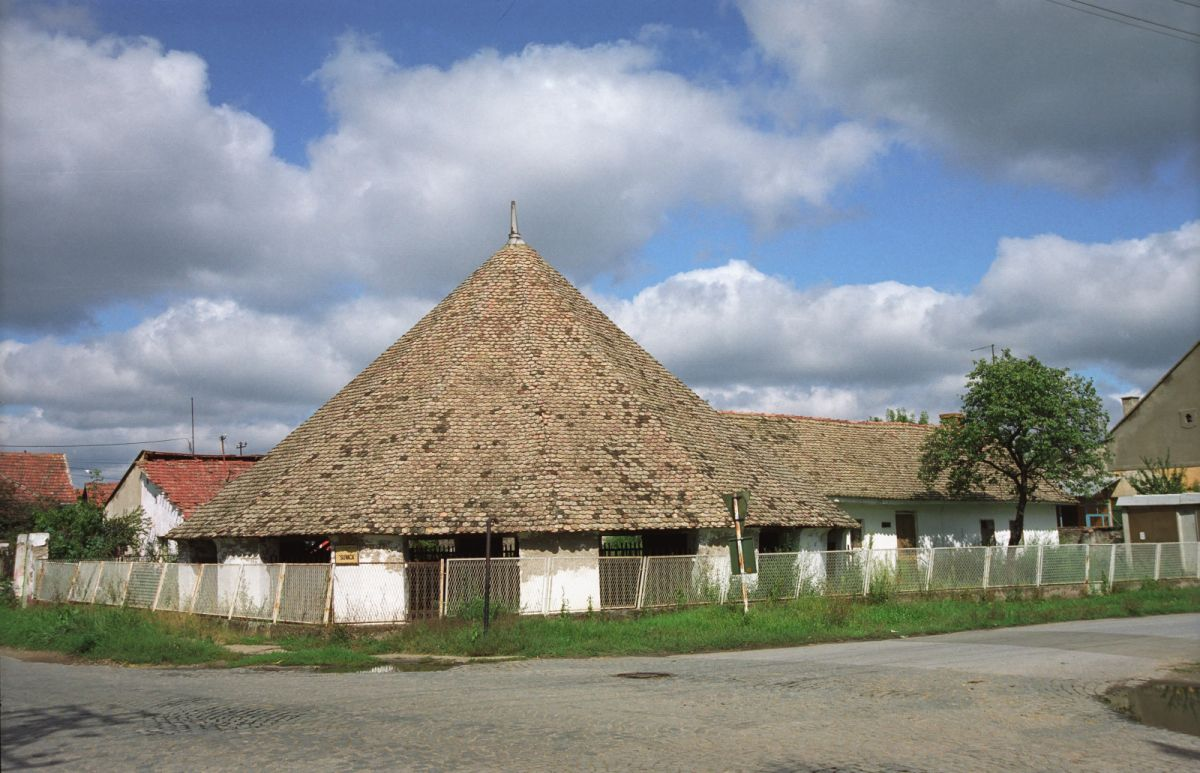
Suvača in Kikinda, Serbia

Suvača consists of three connected parts: the drive space, the mill space, and the miller's apartment. The drive space is the compartment with a pyramid roof where the device is located that runs the mill stones. Although the entire facility called Suvača, Suvača is essentially the part of the building in which the device is located.

The main building is a multi-pyramid shape where the most important part of Suvača—the circular area where the grinding took place—is located. This section of the building is about 15 metres (49 ft) in diameter, with a ceiling height in the center of the pyramid of 8.55 metres (28.1 ft). The roof construction is wooden and is covered in tile. The building relies on fourteen low and three stubby pillars of bricks. Between the columns, the space is enclosed by wooden slat fencing. On the south side, instead of fences, gates were set up using wooden lattices for the introduction of horses into the building. The miller's apartment consists of three rooms: a sitting room, a kitchen, and a cellar. These rooms are located next to the mill area.

== Protection ==
In 1951, Suvača was placed under state protection, and in 1990 it was proclaimed a Monument of Culture of Exceptional Importance.

In March 2018 a reconstruction of the Suvača complex began. The entire wooden mechanism of the mill will be conserved and reconstructed. An additional object will be built within the complex. It is planned to serve as a souvenir and gift shop and as the workshop during certain happenings and festivities. Reconstruction is part of the wider cross-border project which includes the reconstructions of the windmills in Orom, near Kanjiža, and Kiskunfélegyháza, in Hungary. The work should be finished by April 2019.

== See also ==
- Monuments of Culture of Exceptional Importance
- Tourism in Serbia
