= Jovan Popović (writer) =

Serbian writer (1905–1952)

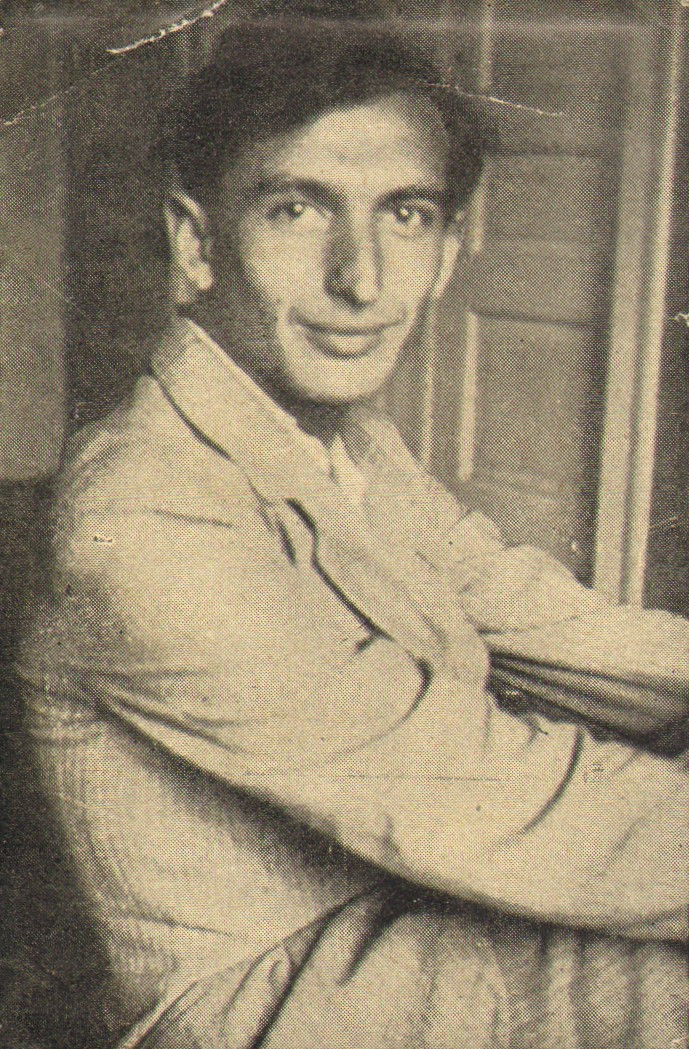
- Born: 18 November 1905; Kikinda, Austria-Hungary
- Died: 13 February 1952 (aged 46); Belgrade, FPR Yugoslavia
- Resting place: Belgrade New Cemetery
- Occupations: Poet, novelist

Jovan Popović (Serbian Cyrillic: Јован Поповић; 18 November 1905 – 13 February 1952) was a Serbian writer and academic.

Popović was born in Kikinda, in modern-day Serbia. He joined the Yugoslav Partisans in the beginning of the armed struggle in Serbia in 1941. He became a member of the Serbian Academy of Sciences and Arts on November 14, 1950. His statue stands on the square of his hometown of Kikinda and a grammar school in Belgrade is named after him.

== Selected works ==
- Knjiga drugova (1929)
- Reda mora da bude (1932)
- Lica u prolazu (1941)
- Istinite legende (1944)
