= Monastery of the Holy Trinity, Kikinda =

Monastery in Serbia

Coordinates: 45.8189°N 20.4678°E

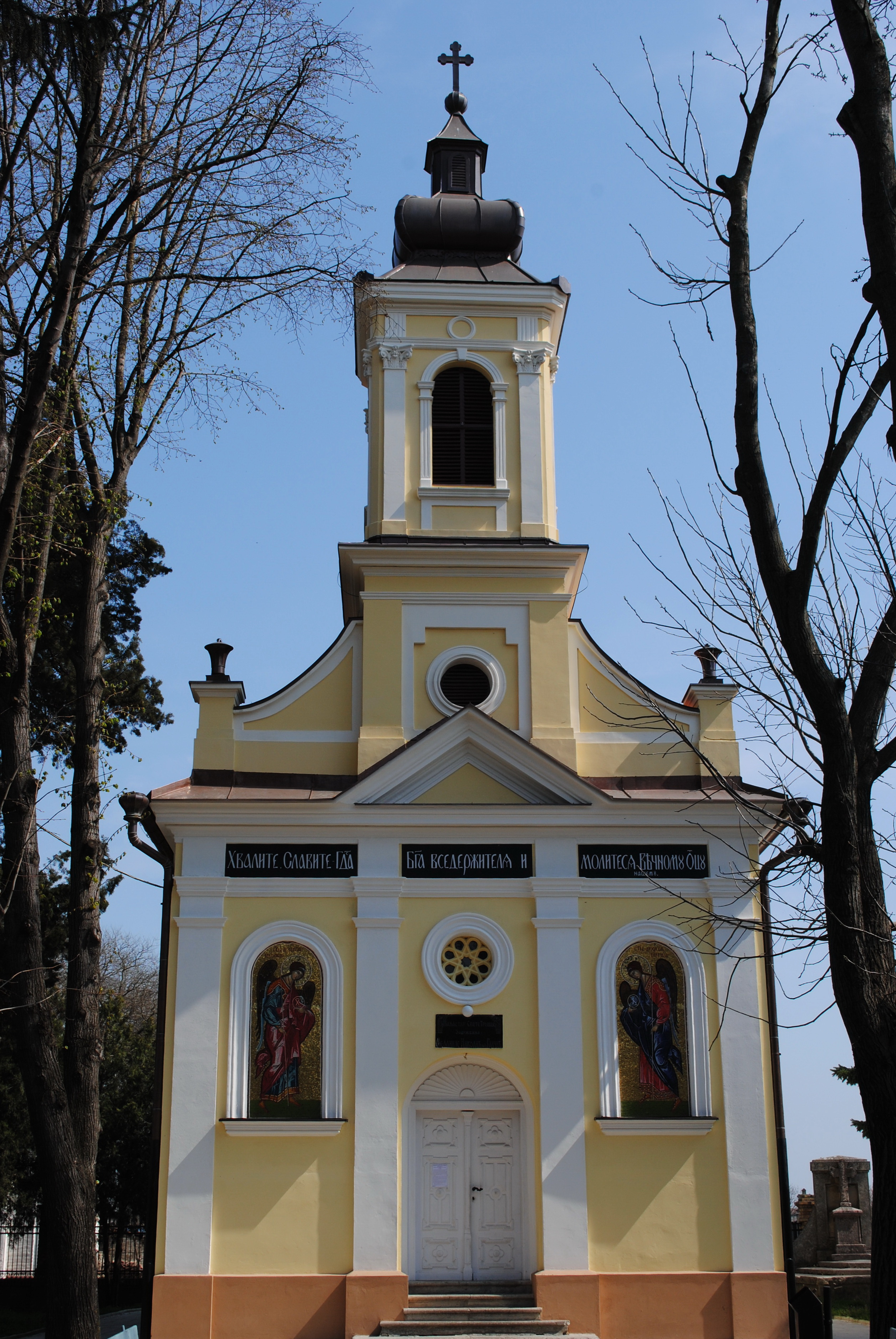
Monastery church

The Holy Trinity Monastery (Serbian: Манастир Свете Тројице, romanized: Manastir Svete Trojice) is a Serbian Orthodox monastery located in the Banat region, in the northern Serbian province of Vojvodina. The monastery is situated in the town of Kikinda. It was built in 1885–87 as a foundation of Melanija Nikolić-Gajčić.

== See also ==
- List of Serbian Orthodox monasteries
