= Radivoj Berbakov =

Serbian painter (1925–2003)

Radivoj Berbakov (11 February 1925 – 1 November 2003) was a Serbian painter. He was born in Kikinda.

He was studying painting at the Academy of Fine Arts in Belgrade in class of professor Zora Petrović.

His paintings are described as impressionist and realist.

Radivoj Berbakov painted landscapes, still life, figures and portraits.

He died on 1 November 2003 in Kikinda.
