= Kinđa =

Copper Age kurgan in Serbia

Coordinates: 45.854722°N 20.392347°E

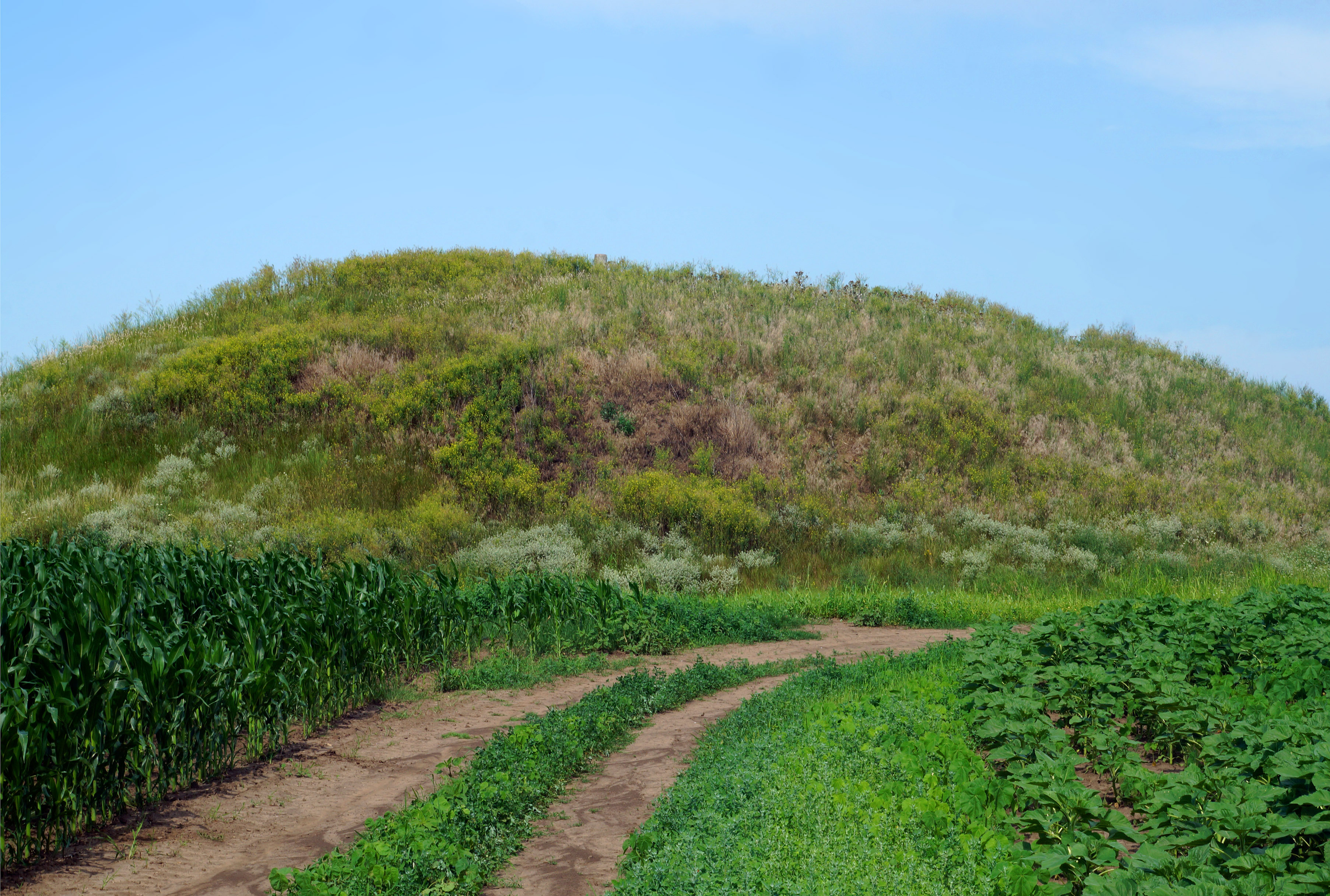
Kinđa Kurgan, before partial destruction in 2017

Kinđa (Serbian: Кинђа) is a Copper Age kurgan, or burial mound, in Serbia. Situated in the northeastern part of Vojvodina, near the town of Kikinda. Even though an artificial feature, it is one of the highest points of the north and northeastern part of the Serbian section of Banat.

== Geography ==
Top of Kinđa is at an altitude of 91 m (299 ft), with the mound itself being elevated 5.3 m (17 ft) to 6 m (20 ft) above the surrounding ground. The mound is earthen, circular and has a diameter of 50 m (160 ft). Surrounding area is a low alluvial terrain, which used to be a marshland, so the village access road to the mound is impassable during the rainy seasons. Abundant running waters in the area either naturally meandered and eutrophicatied long time ago or were drained by the melioration in later times.

== History ==
Even though Kinđа is officially declared an archaeological locality, no excavations have been done, due to its importance for the plant life. It is hypothesized that the mound originates from the Copper Age, during the period when Eastern Europe was overrun by the steppe tribes. Hence, it is most likely of Sarmatian or Scythian origin, from 3rd to 1st century BCE. Local myths claim that it is the tomb of Attila the Hun, who died in 453 AD.

Another hypothesis, based on the condition of the mound and its appearance, is that it was built by the Cumans, in the 13th century. The Cumans settled in Europe fleeing the Tatars and were the last known culture to bury the dead under the kurgans.

== Name ==
The origin of the name is obscure and the true meaning can't be established for sure. The archaeological section of the Kikinda Museum claims that the name of the town is derived from the name of the mound (Kinđa - Kikinda), though this claim has not been universally accepted. Theories on the origin of the name are numerous, claiming possible sources from the Latin, Hungarian, Serbian, Romanian, Turkish and Old Slavonic languages.

== Importance ==
Kinđa is the largest and was one of the best preserved kurgans in Serbia, which are all over 8 centuries old. Based on its monumental size, it is believed that Kinđa is the tomb of someone very important. In the vicinity of Kinđa there are number of other hillocks which can be identified as kurgans, which makes Kikinda a place with the richest eneolithic heritage in Serbia. However those other mounds, 5 or 6 of them, are in bad shape and gradually being reduced to the agricultural land. Another archaeological locality, "Gradište", is situated close to Kinđa, in the village of Iđoš.

The mound is somewhat of a symbol of Kikinda. A section of the municipality is named after it, so as a street and a neighborhood in the town itself. The mountaineering club in Kikinda is also named "Kinđa", as it is the highest elevation point in the region.

One of the reasons for the preservation of the mound's original shape is the lush, autochthonous vegetation which covers it. As most of the land in Vojvodina is being used for extensive agriculture for centuries, Kinđa represents a genetic reserve for the original steppe and meadow flora. As the foothills of the mound are not being cultivated, the vegetation on top is not being nitrified, nor the weeds are invading it because of the pre-vegetation which grows slightly above the ground. On the top of the mound there are small turfs of crested wheat grass, the typical grass of the loess ledges. European feather grass also grows on the mound, though it is mostly extinct from other parts of Banat. Other plants include common couch and horehound. Vegetation on other mounds in the surrounding area is destroyed and turned into an agricultural land.

== 2017 incident ==
Kinđa is not under the state protection and has not been declared a cultural monument, but the local government in Kikinda proclaimed it an "archaeologically important locality" in 2013, and until 2017 it was considered to be in the good shape. Local agricultural company "Almex Kinđa" owns the land in the area since 2011, including lots on which Kinđa is partially located. As the other mounds are not protected at all, the company partially destroyed them in the previous years. In May 2017, the company destroyed the northeastern part of Kinđa, which is on their land, using heavy machinery. Experts from Kikinda and Subotica inspected the location, found some fragments of medieval ceramics and concluded that the devastation of the mound is beyond repair, since the entire section, up to 3.5 m (11 ft) high, was dredged, with the earth partially removed and partially flattened. The company issued an apology, claiming that they didn't know there is a special procedure when dealing with Kinđa and that they are the only ones who take care of it anyway. Reporters claimed that an entire half of the hill was destroyed. Company reacted with a statement that they didn't destroy anything: they just "displaced" some 10 m^{3} (350 cu ft) of earth out of 6,000 m^{3} (210,000 cu ft), how much they estimate the entire mound has. However, the photos show that at least 30 to 40% of the mound is missing. But, as Kinđa was not protected by the state, the company was just "warned" to be more careful in the future.

== Gallery ==
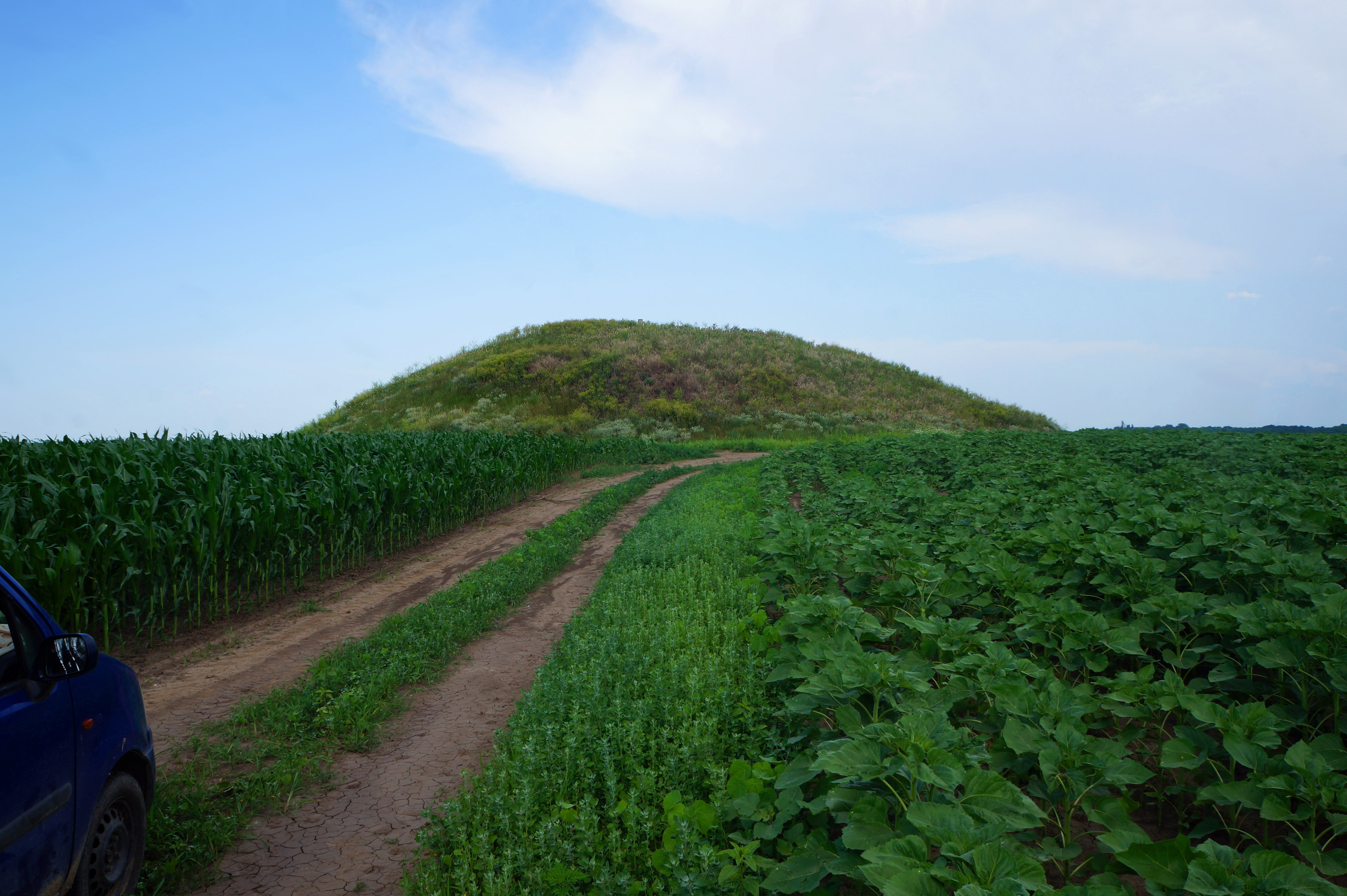

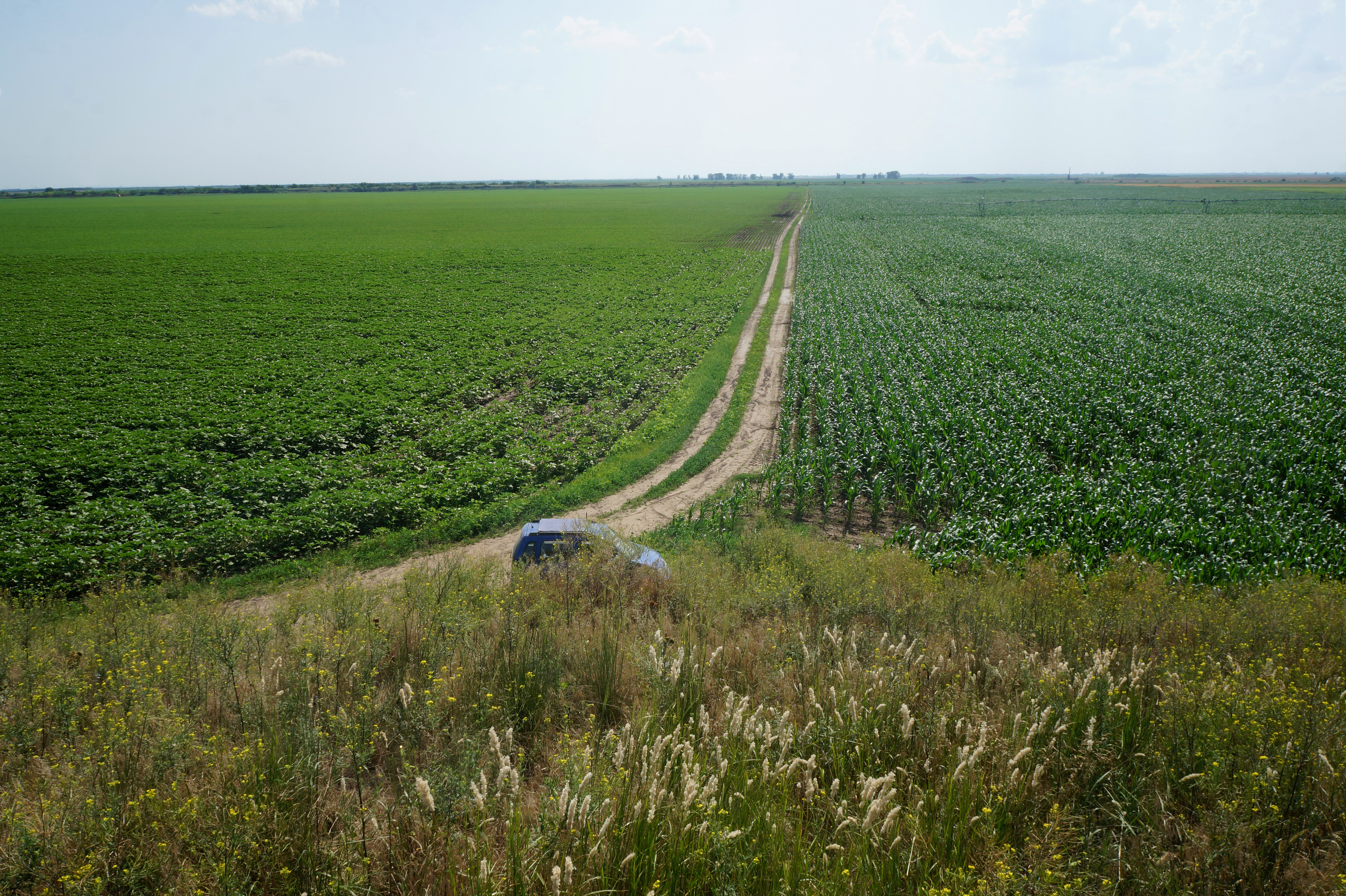

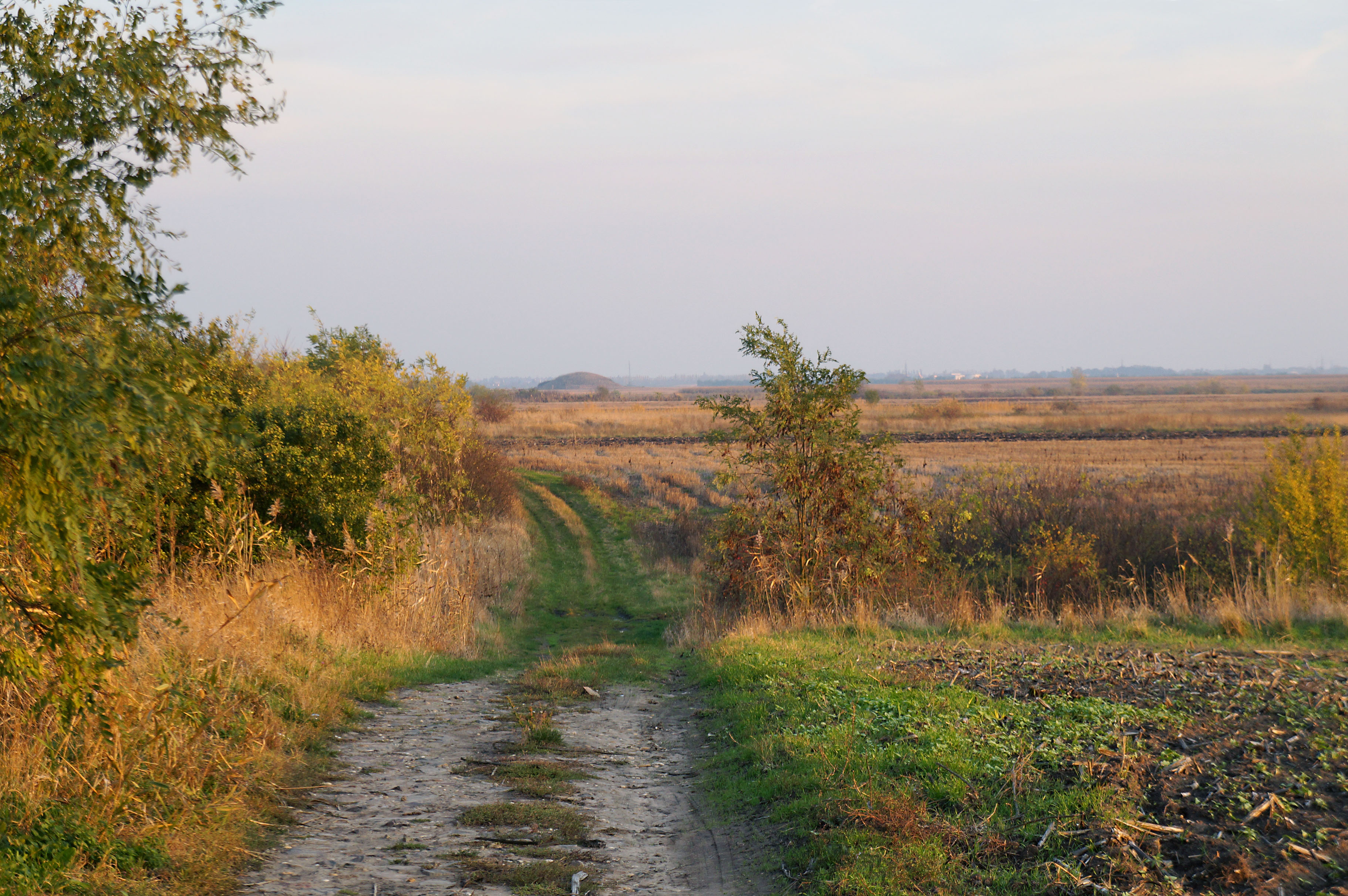

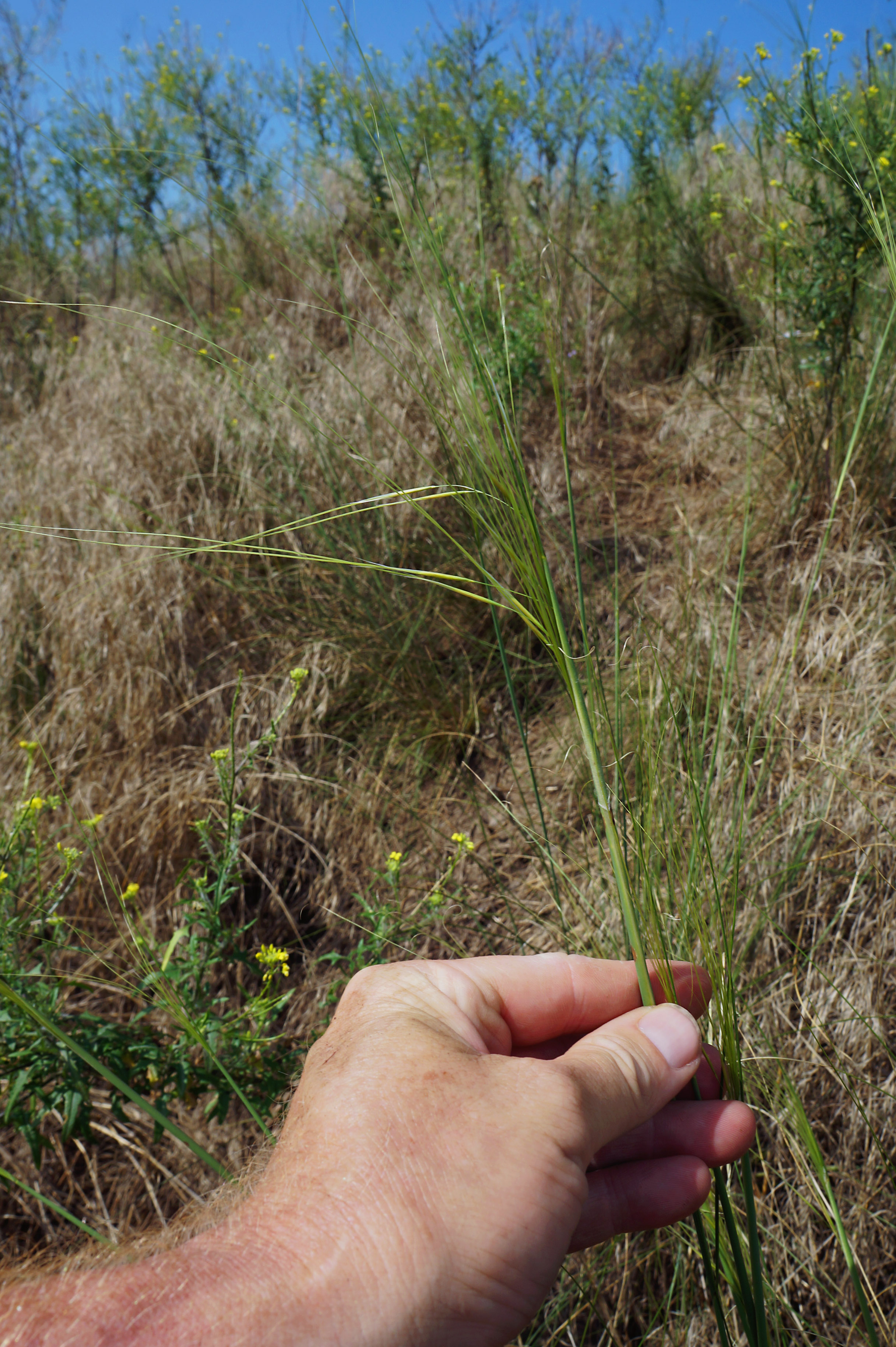

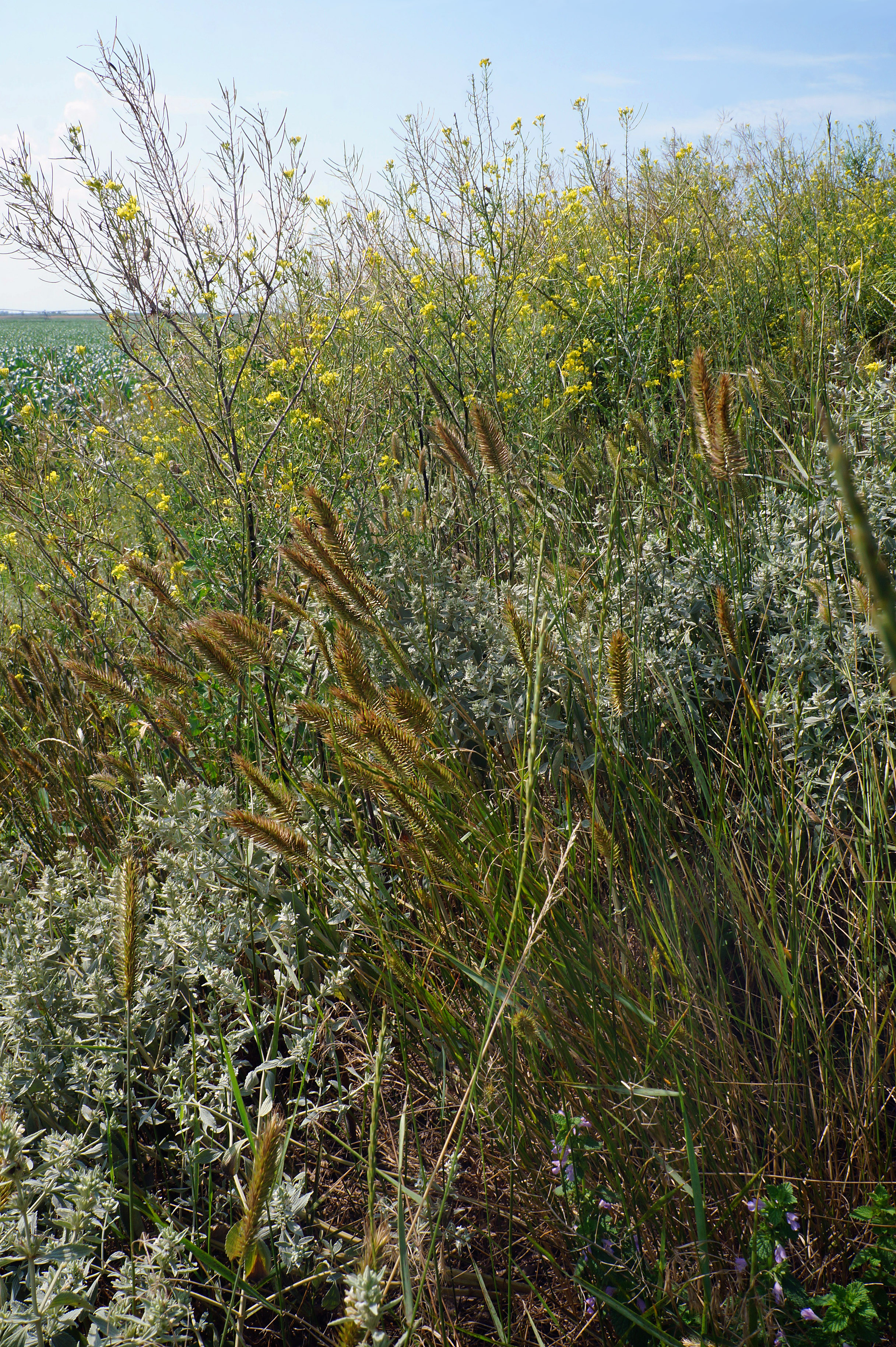

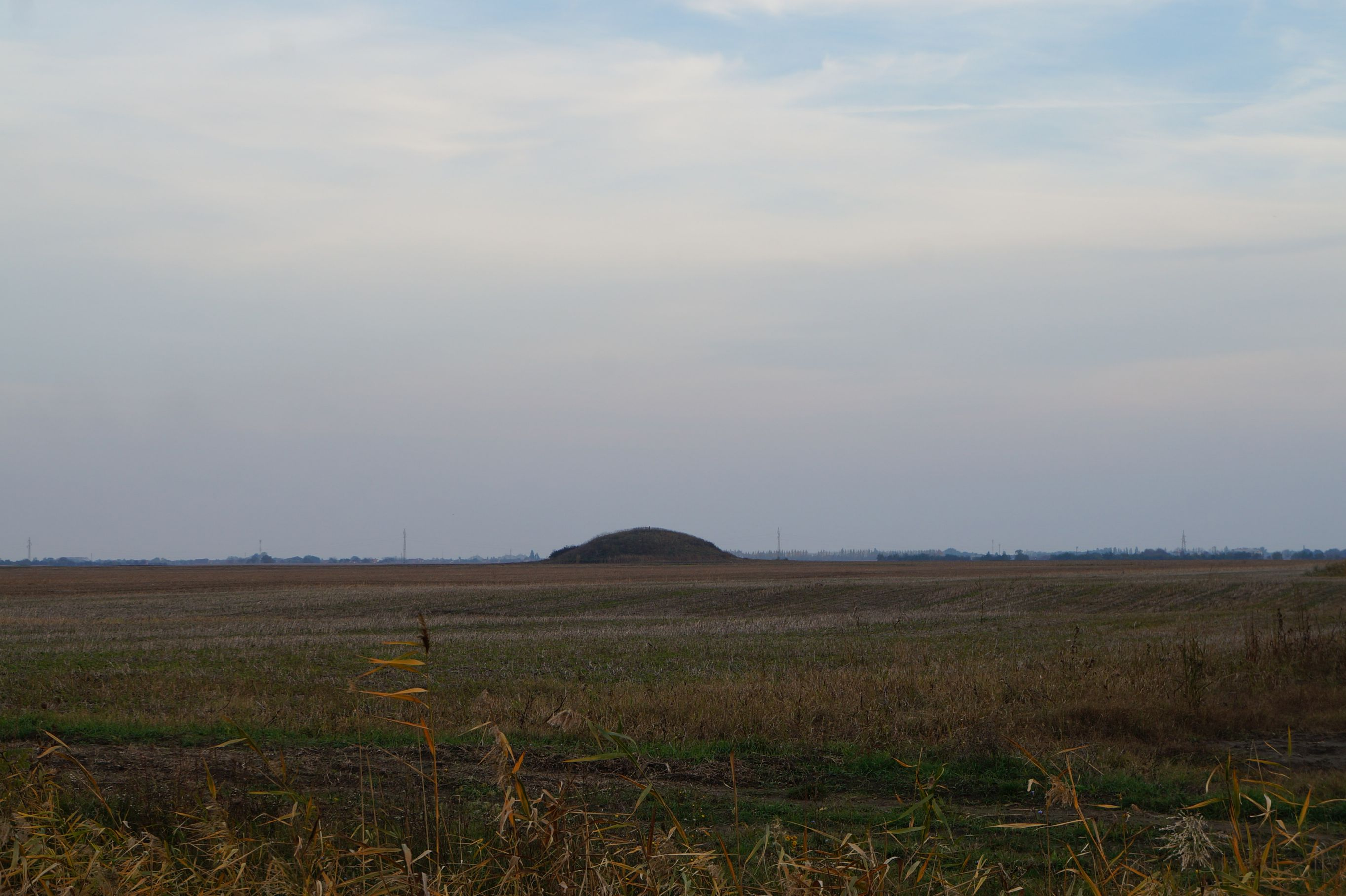

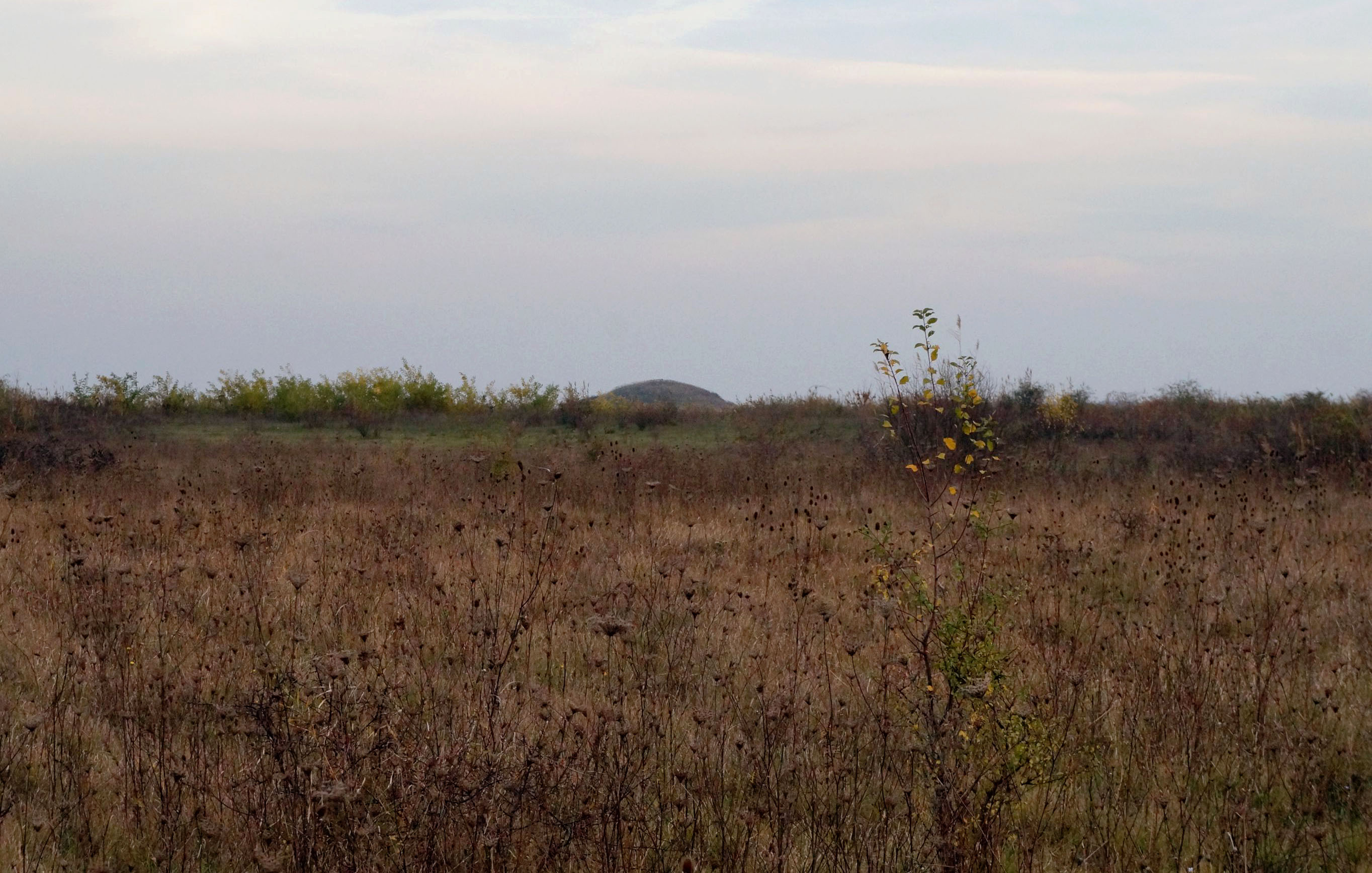

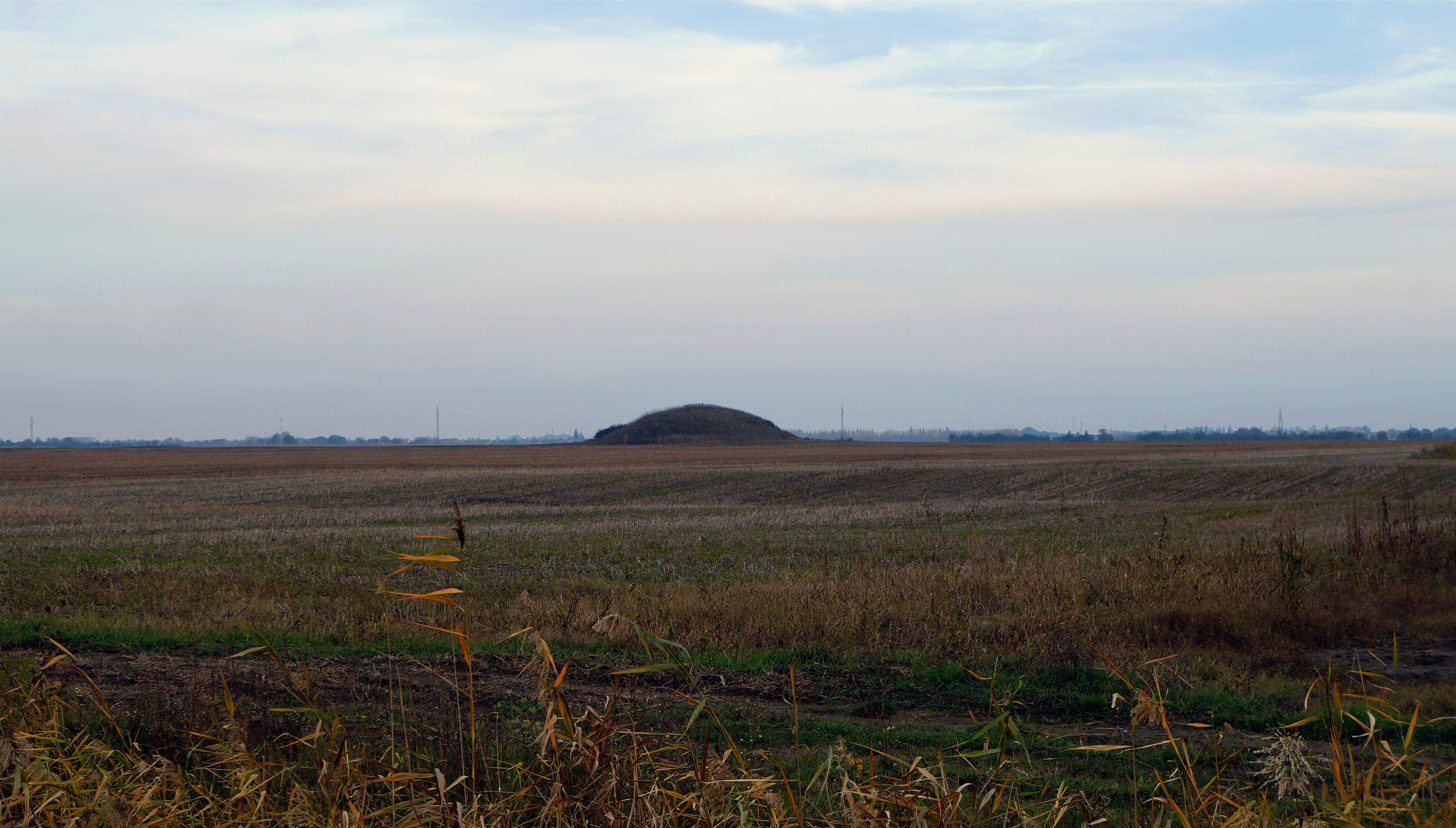

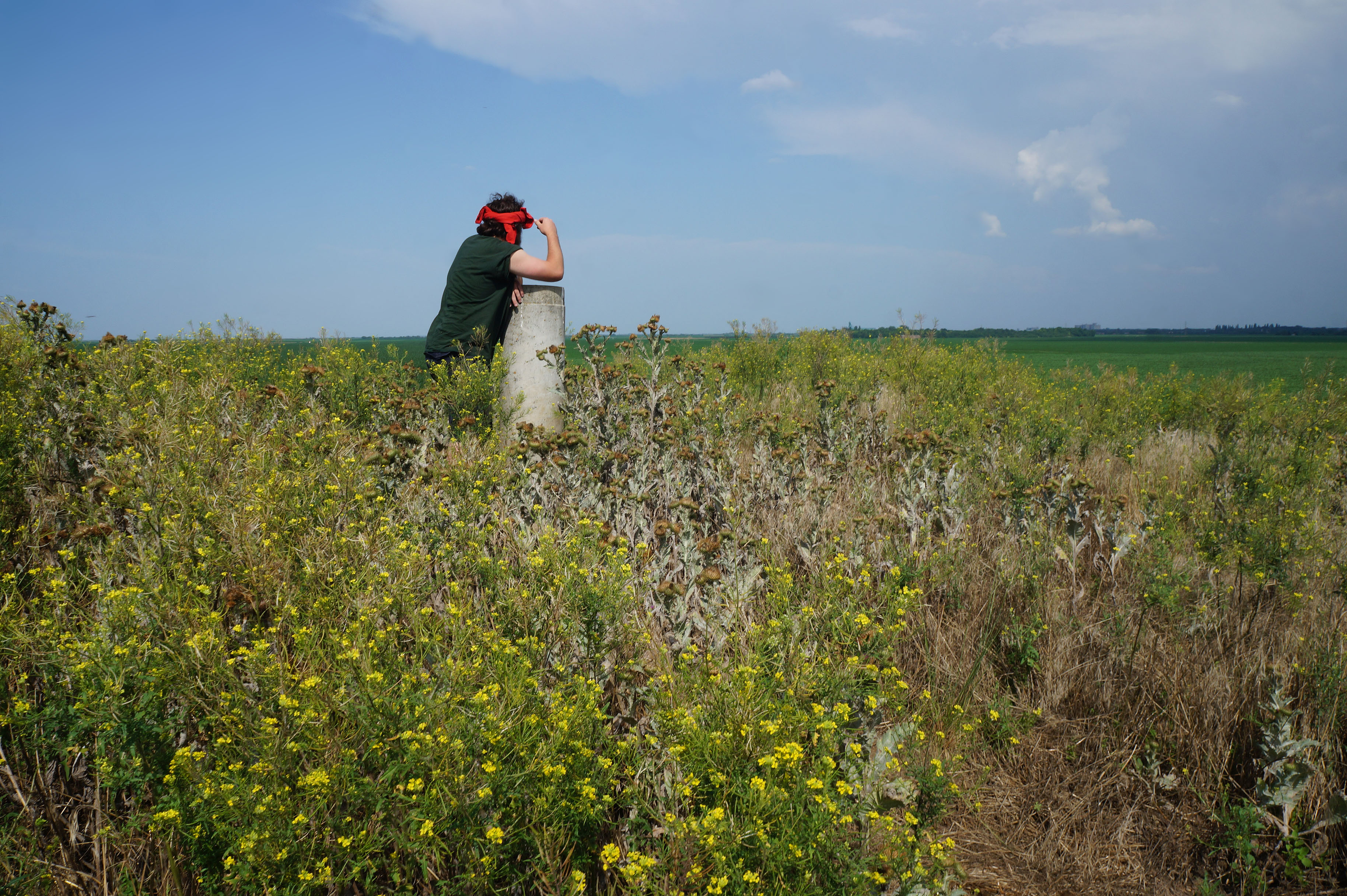

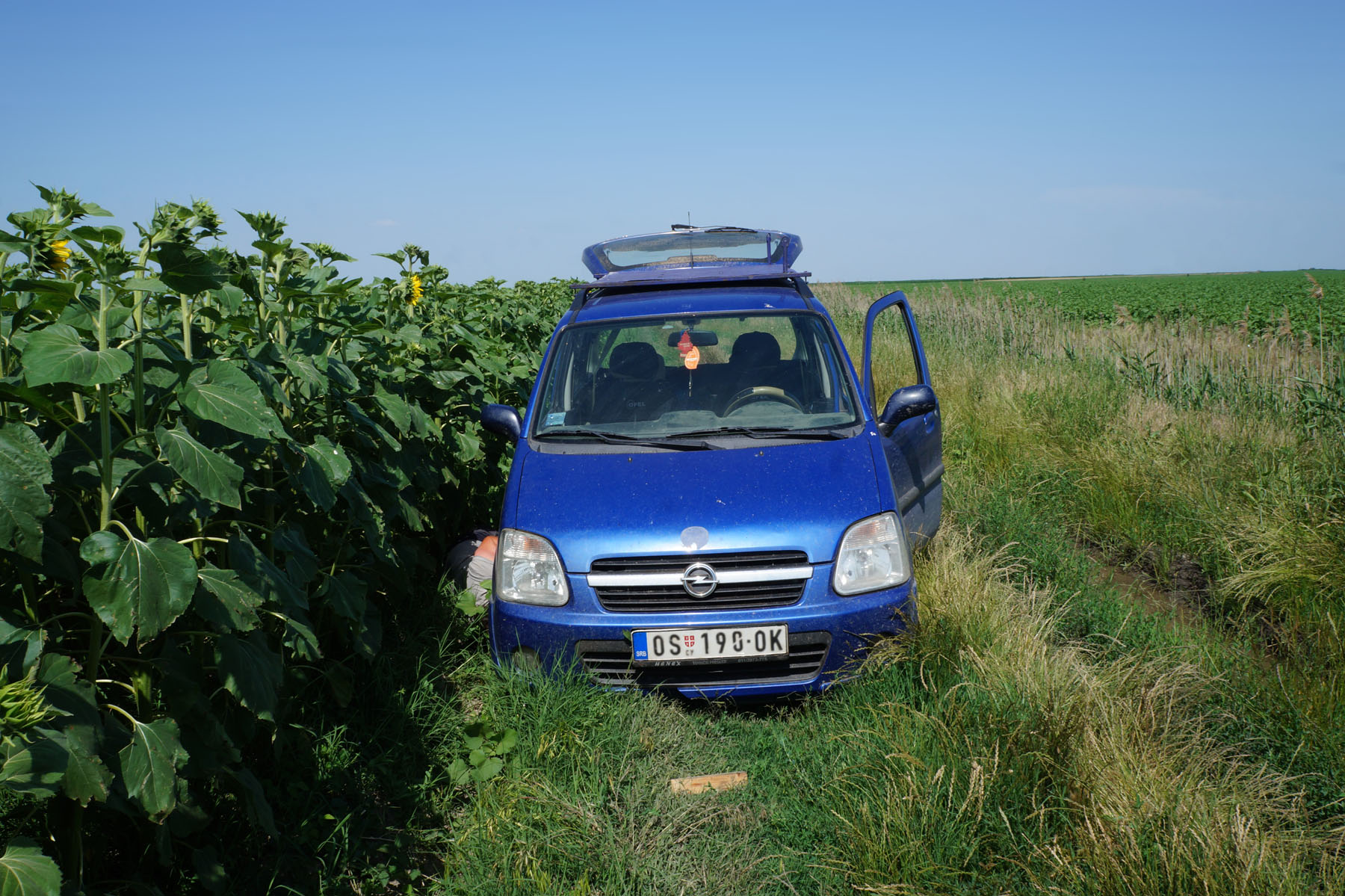
