= Kikinda =

City in the province of Vojvodina, Serbia

Kikinda Кикинда (Serbian) Nagykikinda (Hungarian)
- City
- City of Kikinda
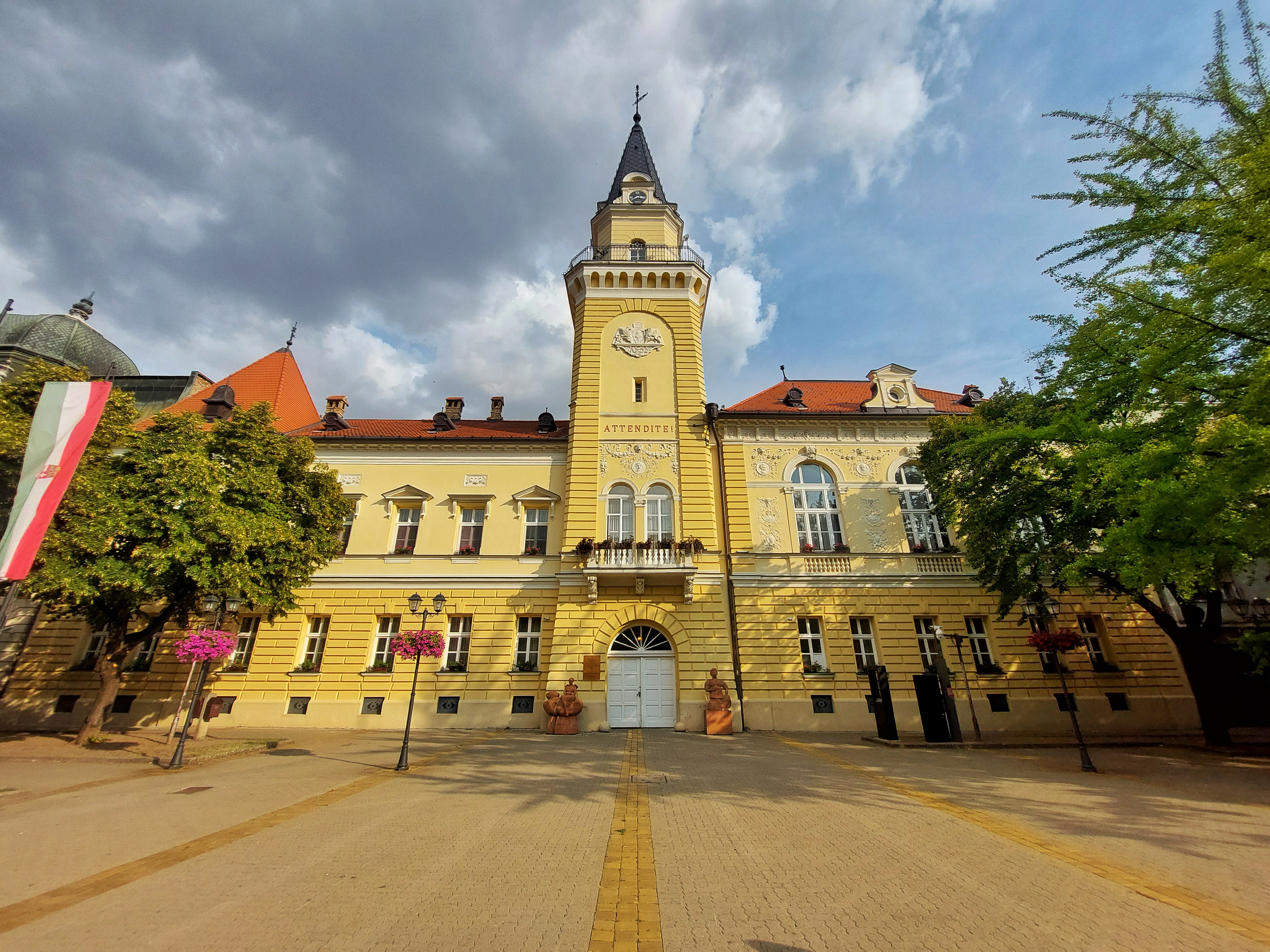
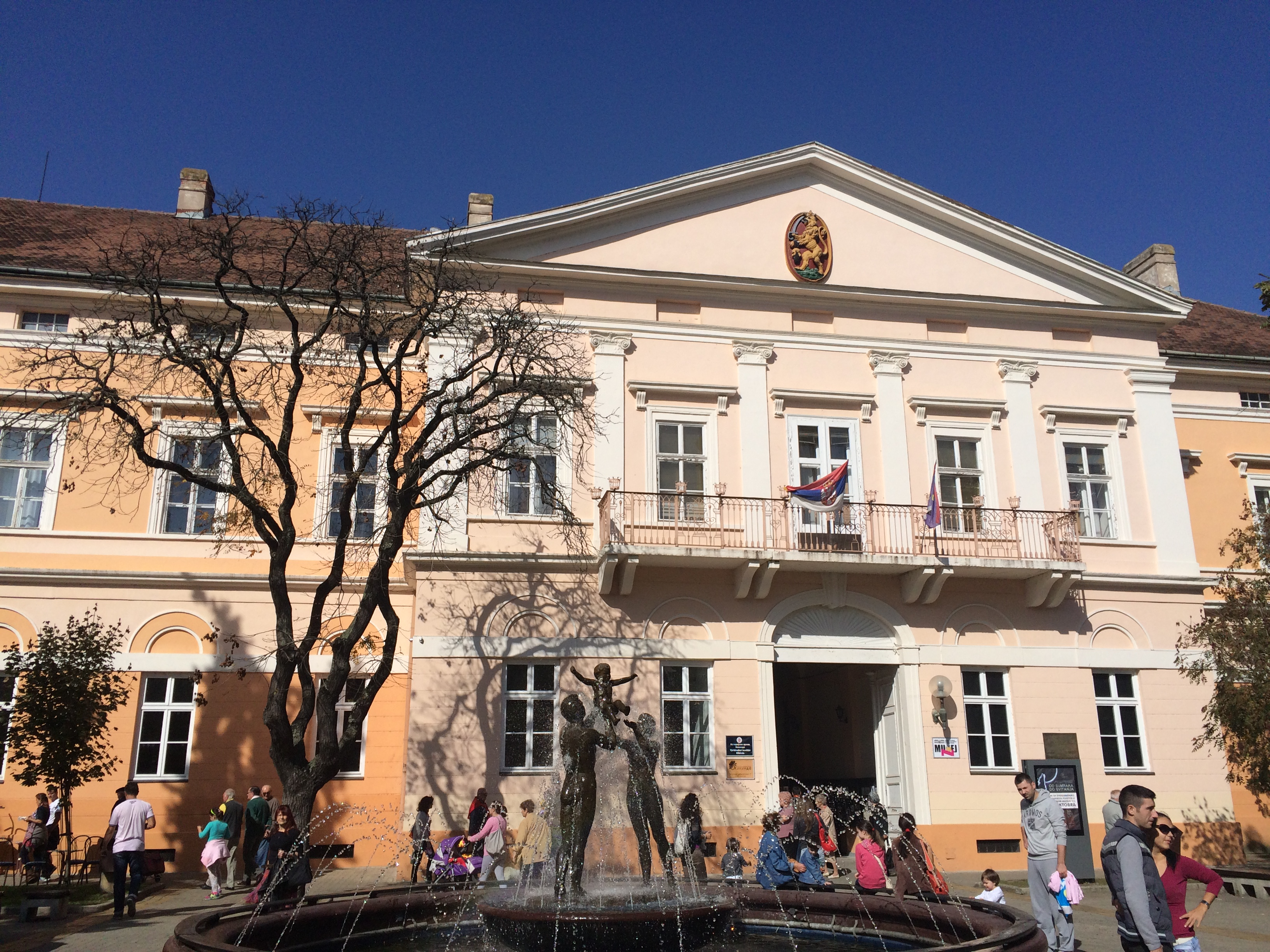
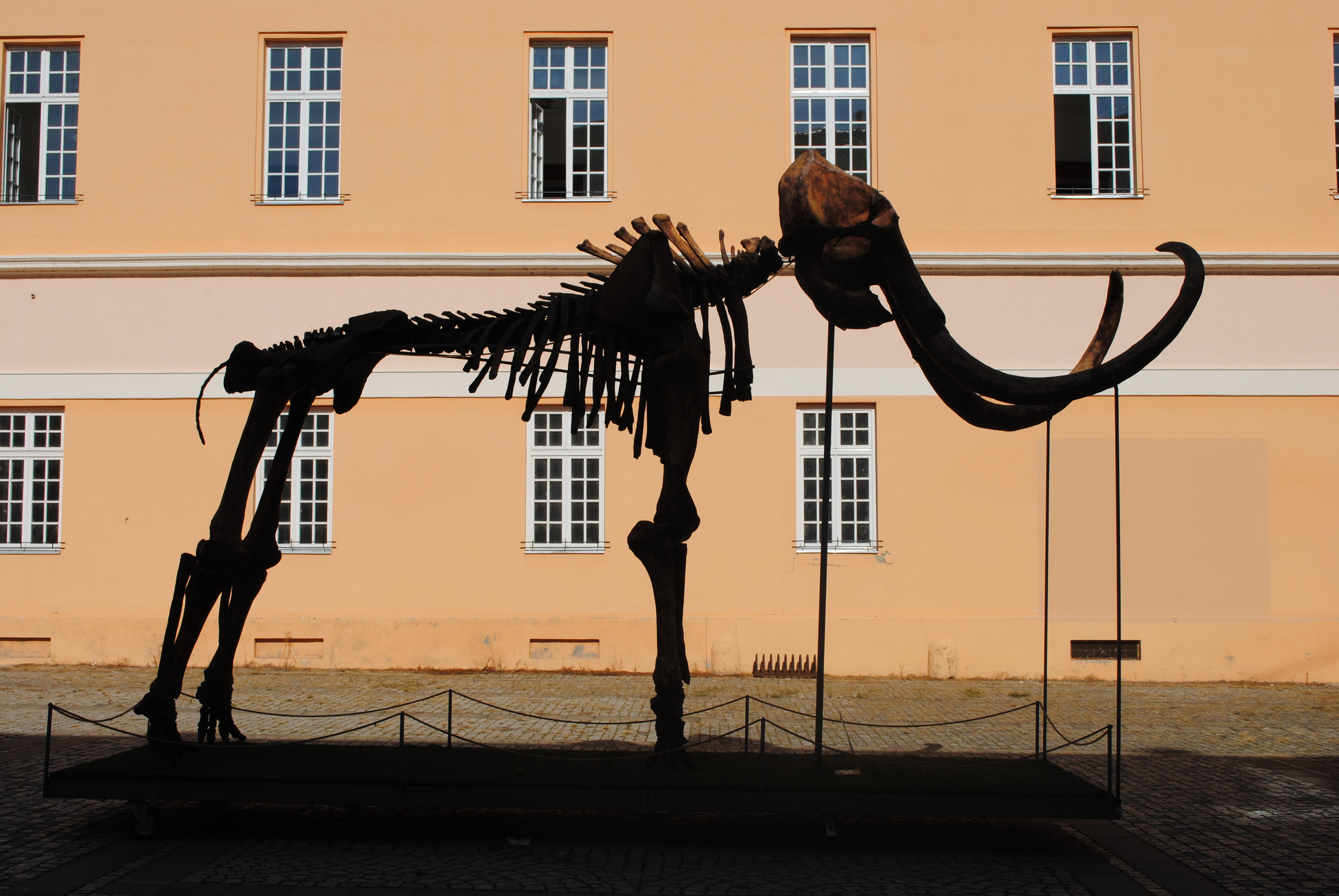
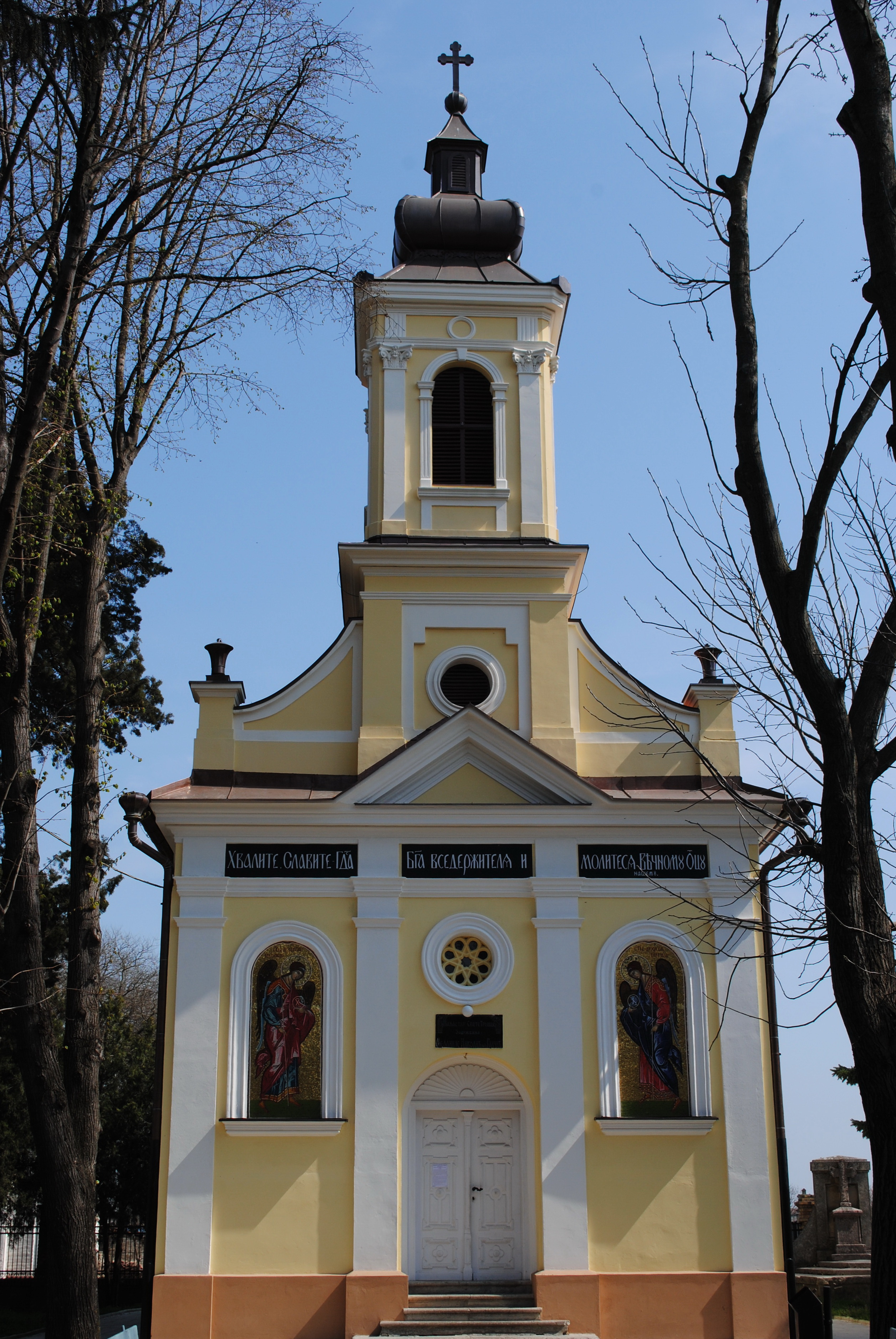
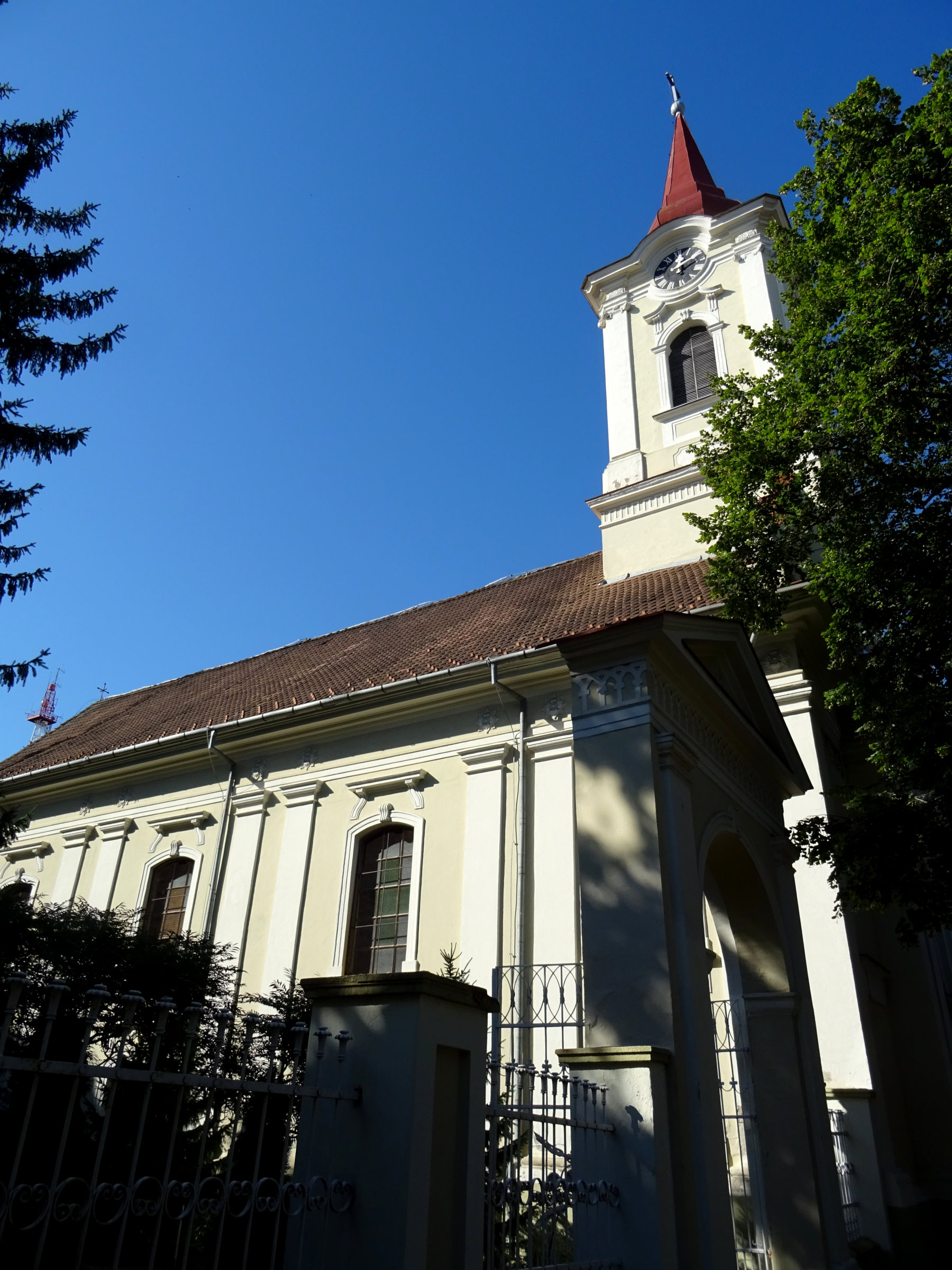
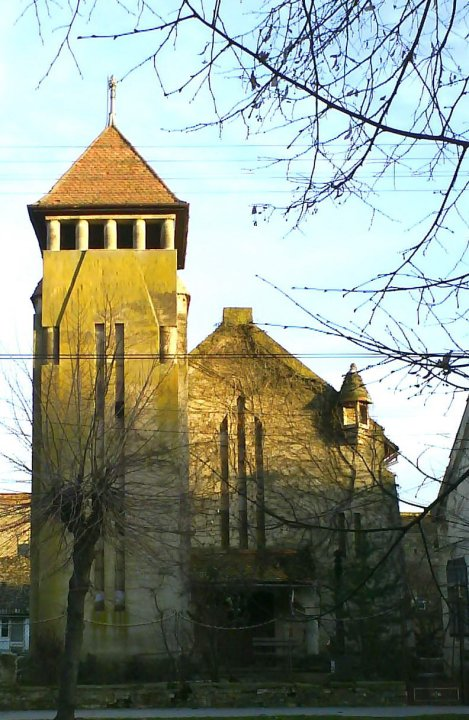
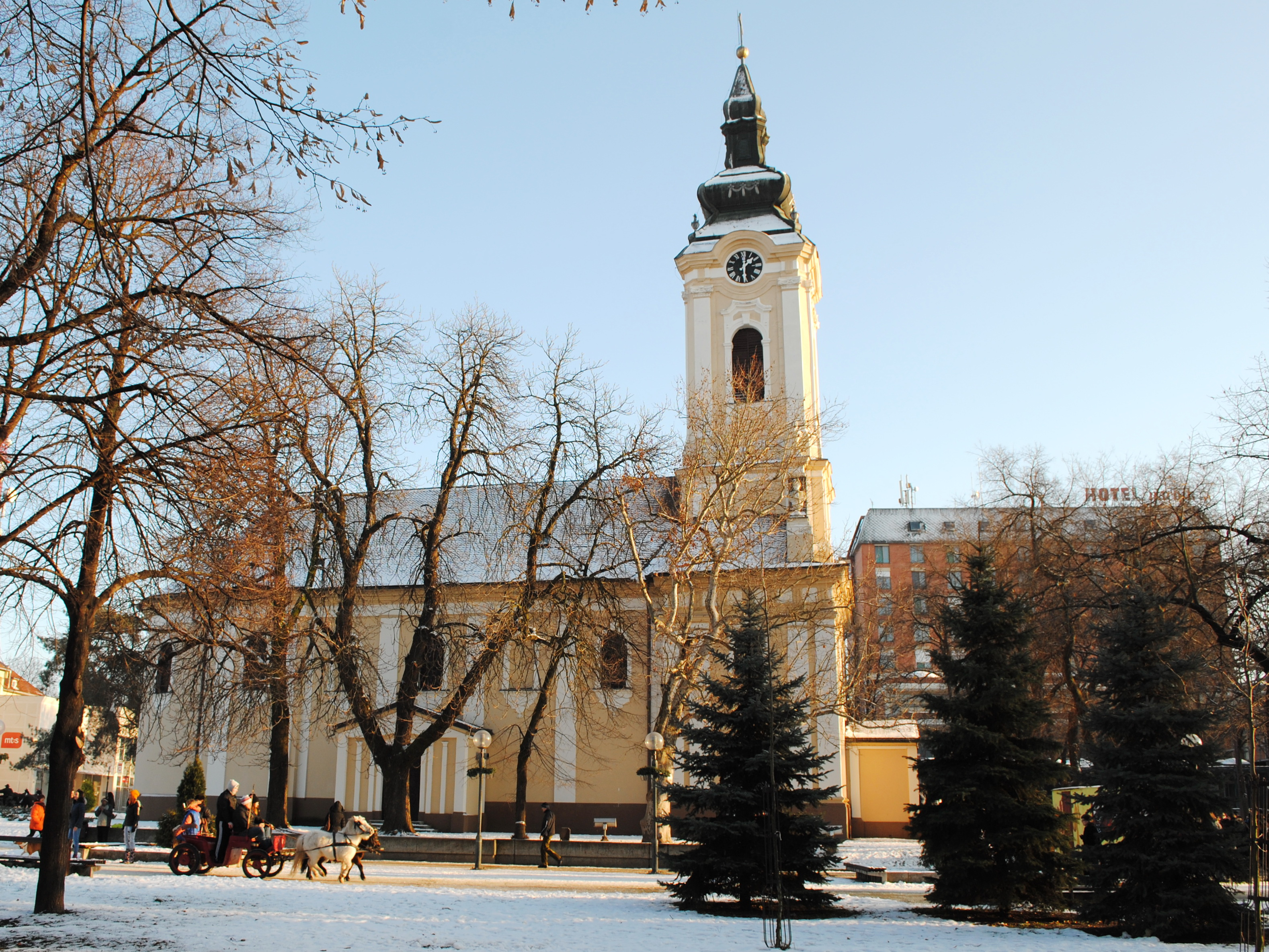
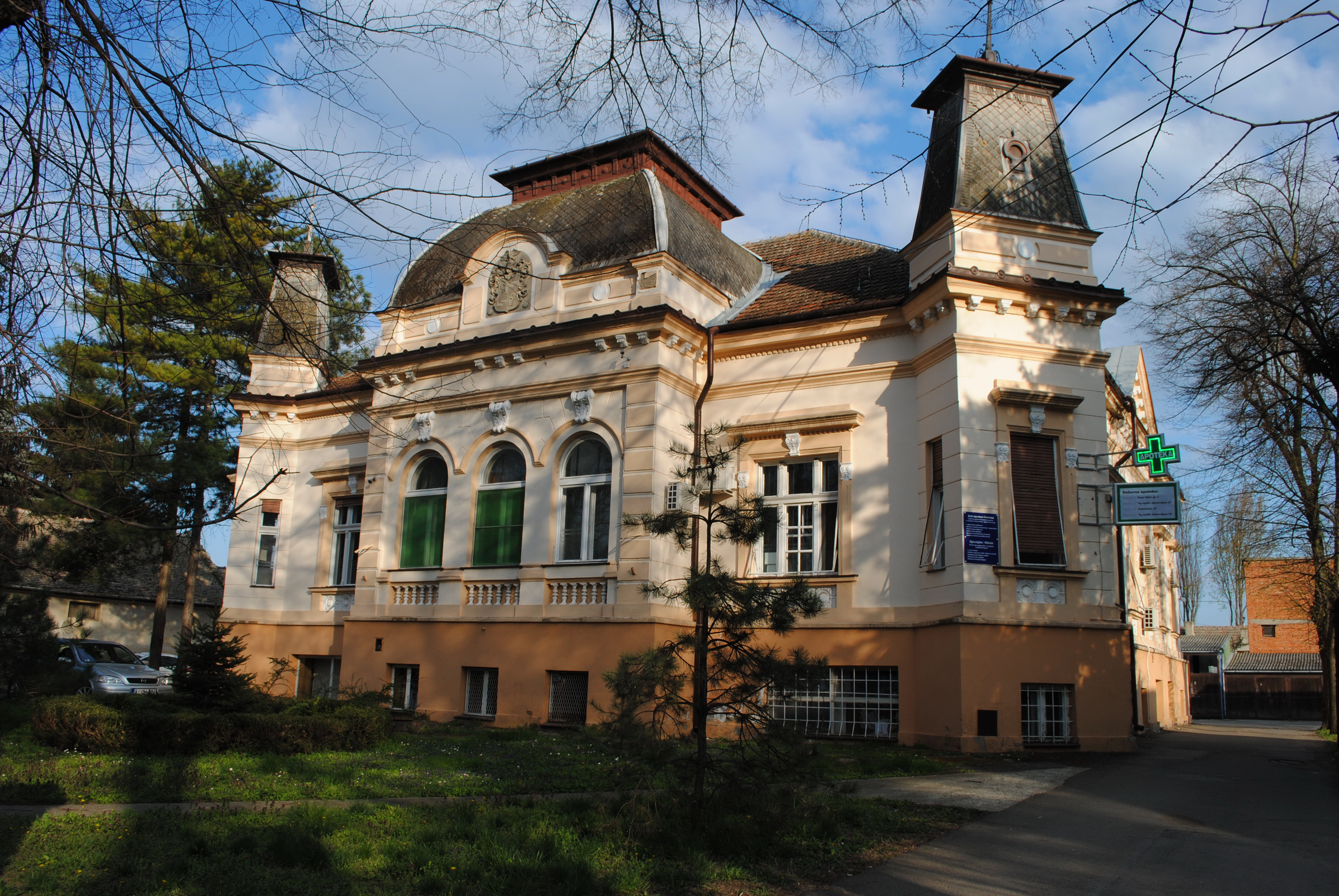
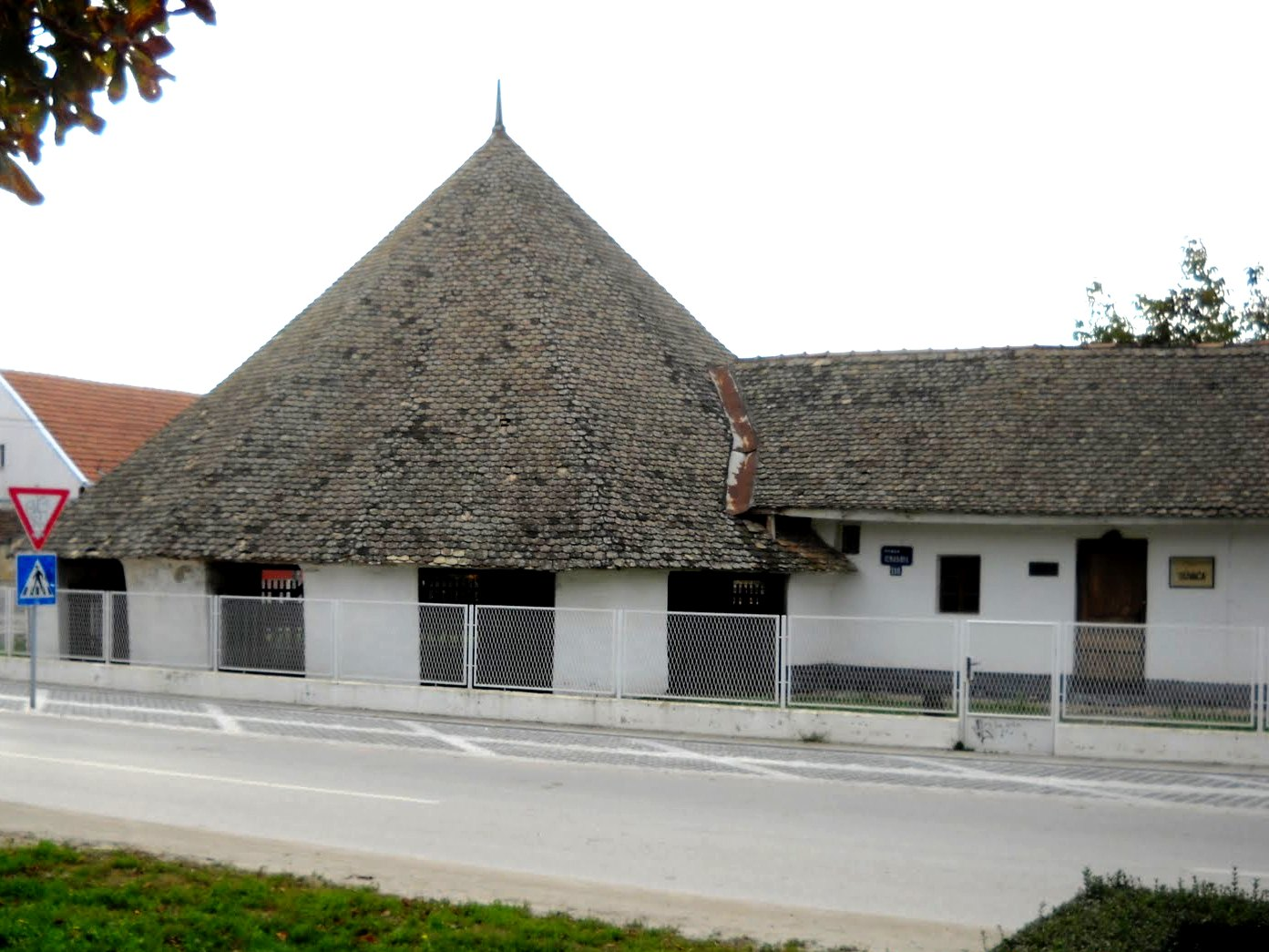
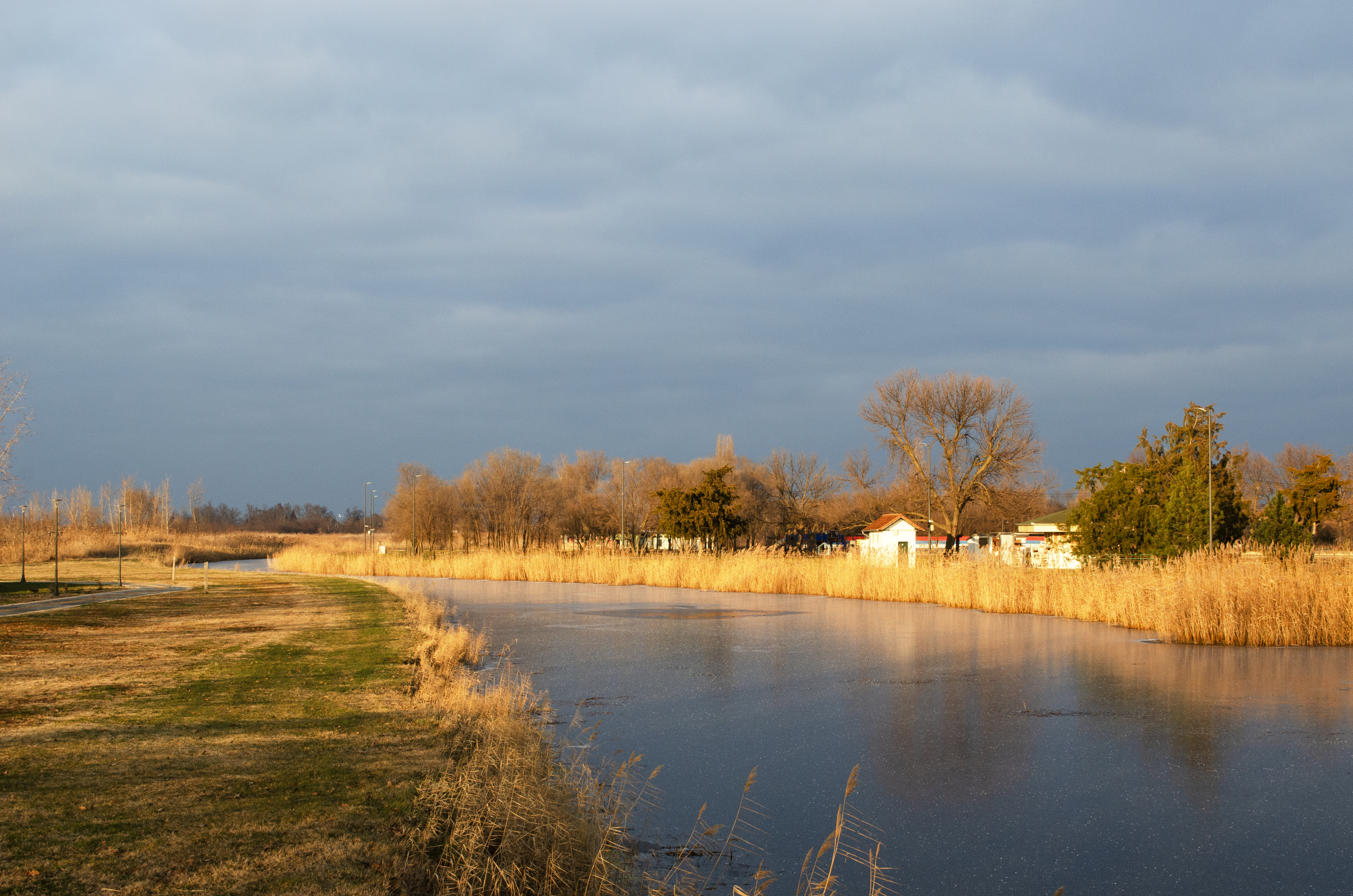
- Kikinda City Hall National Museum & Archive of Kikinda Mammoth Kika sculpture Monastery of the Holy Trinity Church of St. Francis of Assisi Reformation Church Church of St. Nicholas Villa Rizenfelder Suvača- horse mill Kikinda's pond

- Flag Coat of arms

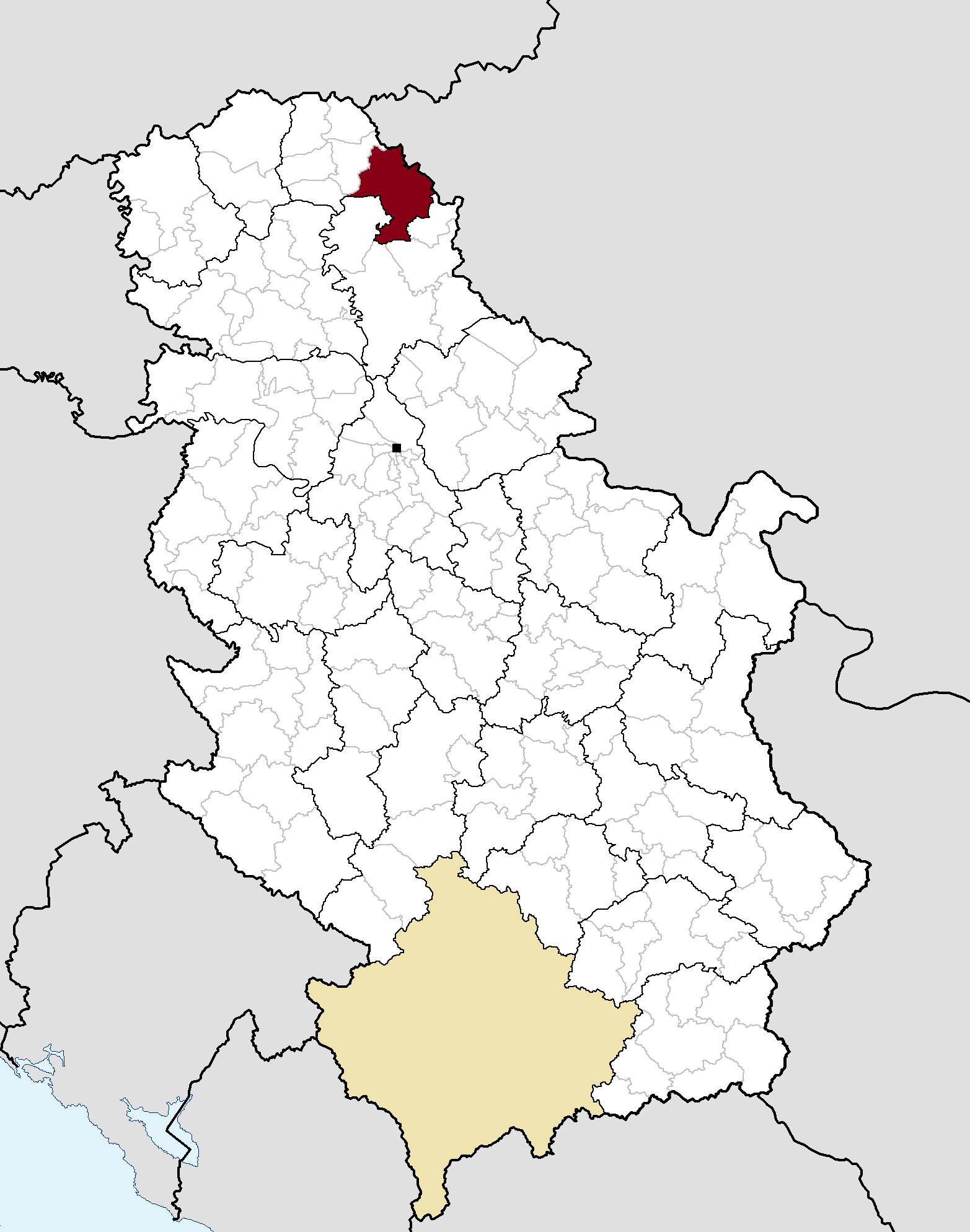
- Location of the city of Kikinda (red) within Serbia
- Interactive map of Kikinda
- Coordinates: 45°50′N 20°27′E
- Country: Serbia
- Province: Vojvodina
- Region: Banat
- District: North Banat
- Municipality: Kikinda
- City status: March 2016

Government
  - Mayor: Mladen Bogdan (SNS)

Area
  - Rank: 20th in Serbia
  - Urban: 189.68 km^{2} (73.24 sq mi)
  - Administrative: 782.46 km^{2} (302.11 sq mi)
- Elevation: 78 m (256 ft)

Population (2022 census)
  - Rank: 25th in Serbia
  - Urban: 32,084
  - Urban density: 169.15/km^{2} (438.09/sq mi)
  - Administrative: 49,326
  - Administrative density: 63.040/km^{2} (163.27/sq mi)
- Demonym(s): Kikinđani, (sr)
- Time zone: UTC+1 (CET)
  - Summer (DST): UTC+2 (CEST)
- Postal code: 23300
- Area code: +381(0)230
- ISO 3166 code: SRB
- Car plates: KI
- Official languages: Serbian together with Hungarian in Kikinda, Banatska Topola, Rusko Selo and Sajan
- Website: kikinda.org.rs

Kikinda (Serbian Cyrillic: Кикинда, pronounced [kǐkiːnda]; Hungarian: Nagykikinda) is a city and the administrative center of the North Banat District in Serbia. The city's urban area has 32,084 inhabitants, while the city administrative area has 49,326 inhabitants.

The city was founded in the 18th century. From 1774 to 1874 Kikinda was the seat of the District of Velika Kikinda, an autonomous administrative unit of Habsburg monarchy. In 1893, Kikinda was granted the status of a city. The city became part of the Kingdom of Serbia (and Kingdom of Serbs, Croats and Slovenes) in 1918, and it lost the city status. The status was re-granted in 2016.

In 1996, the well-preserved archaeological remnants of a half a million-year-old mammoth were excavated on the outer edge of the town area. The mammoth called "Kika" has become one of the symbols of the town. Today it is exhibited in the National Museum of Kikinda. Other attractions of the city are the Suvača – a unique horse-powered dry mill, the annual Pumpkin Days and the International Symposium of Sculpture "Terra". The winter roosts of long-eared owls, with a large number of individuals, are easily accessible as they are situated in town parks and attract birdwatchers both from this country and abroad.

== Name ==
In Serbian, the city is known as Kikinda (Кикинда), and similarly in Croatian and Rusyn; yet in other languages it is called Great Kikinda: in Hungarian as Nagykikinda, in German as Gross Kikinda or Großkikinda, in Latin as Magna Kikinda, in Romanian as Chichinda Mare. Until 1947 it was also known in Serbian as Great Kikinda — Velika Kikinda (Велика Кикинда).

The name of Kikinda is first found recorded at the beginning of the 15th century as Kokenyd, and most probably denoted, together with the name Ecehida, a number of small settlements, i.e. estates, firstly belonging to Hungarian and later to Serb local rulers. The name of the town first appears on a map of 1718 as Gross Kikinda, indicating an uninhabited area or a wasteland and not a settlement. The adjective Gross, Nagy or Velika (Great) in German, Hungarian and Serbian versions respectively, was in official use as the name of the town until the end of 1947.

== Coat of arms ==
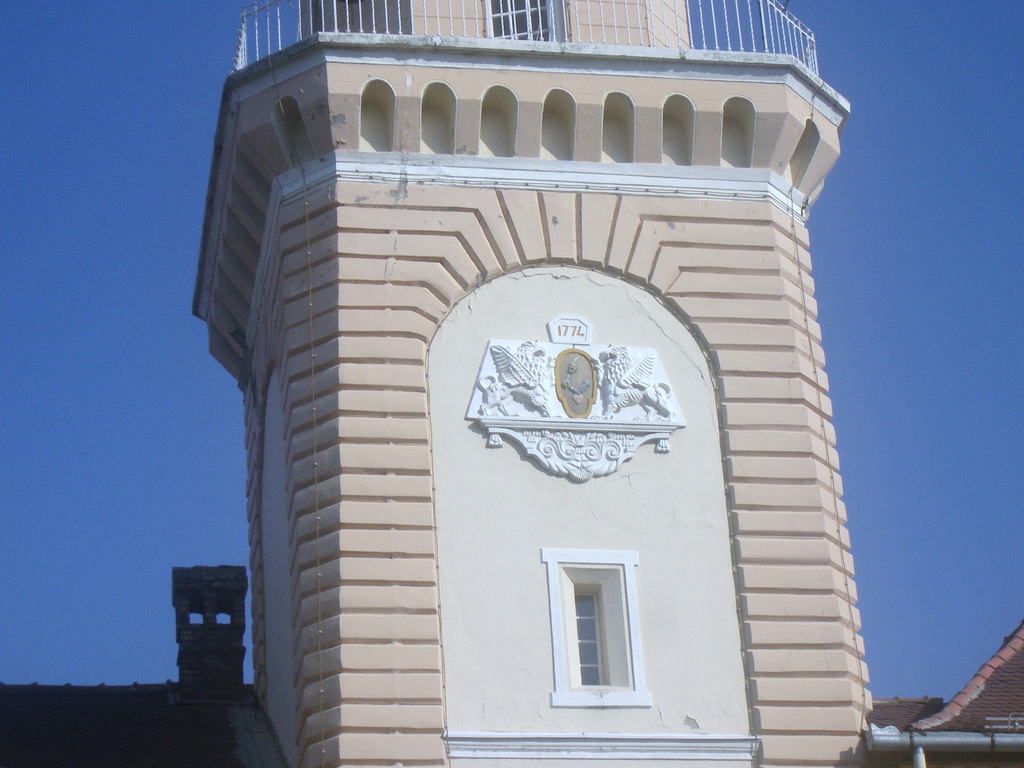
Coat of arms on the City Hall

The official coat of arms of the city dates back to the Austrian rule and the 18th century. It is derived from the coat of arms of the District of Velika Kikinda which was issued by Maria Theresa of Austria on 12 November 1774. The Coat of Arms represents a hand holding a sabre on which an Ottoman Turkish head is impaled. It symbolizes the fight of Serbs and the majority ethnic Hungarians at that time, against the Turks during the Military Frontier period and the military contributions of the population of Kikinda during the Austro-Ottoman Wars.

In 2007, Branislav Blažić, then president of the municipality of Kikinda, asked for the change of the coat of arms, criticizing it for being "morbid". The idea proved very controversial, and ultimately the coat was not changed. Most critics of Blažić stated that the coat of arms is a part of the history and tradition of Kikinda and so an important factor of the city identity.

The severed head of a Turk is also one of the common symbols in Austrian and Hungarian heraldry. It symbolizes the struggle of Serb soldiers of the Habsburg Empire (Austrian Empire) against the Ottoman Empire during the Austro-Ottoman Wars.

== History ==
The city of Kikinda is located on a territory rich in remains of old and bygone cultures. Numerous archeological findings are the testimony of people who lived here more than seven thousand years ago. However, the continuity of that duration was often broken. People arrived and departed, lived and disappeared, depending on various historical circumstances.

=== Medieval history ===
Two important medieval settlements existed near the location of modern Kikinda. The names of these settlements were Galad and Hološ. Galad was one of the oldest Slavic settlements in northern Banat and was built by Slavic duke Glad in the ninth century. In 1337, Galad was recorded as settlement populated almost exclusively by Serbs. This settlement was destroyed during the Austro-Ottoman wars at the end of 17th and beginning of the 18th century.

Another settlement, Hološ (also known as Velika Holuša), was a local administrative centre in the 17th century, during the Ottoman administration. This settlement was also destroyed at the end of the 17th century.

According to some sources, an older settlement named Kekenj (Kekend, Keken) existed at this location. In 1423 it was mentioned as the domain of Hungarian kings, under the name of Kokenyd, and as a property of the Hungarian king Sigismund. In 1558, this settlement was populated by Serbs. It was deserted after the Banat Uprising in 1594.

=== Modern history ===
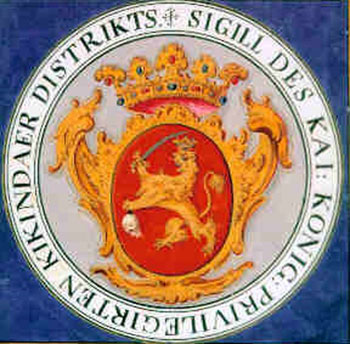
Seal of the District of Velika Kikinda

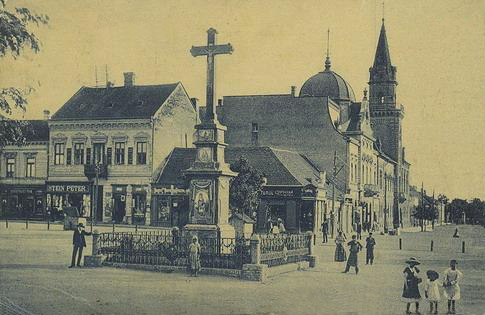
Cross at the main square in Kikinda, at the beginning of the 20th century.

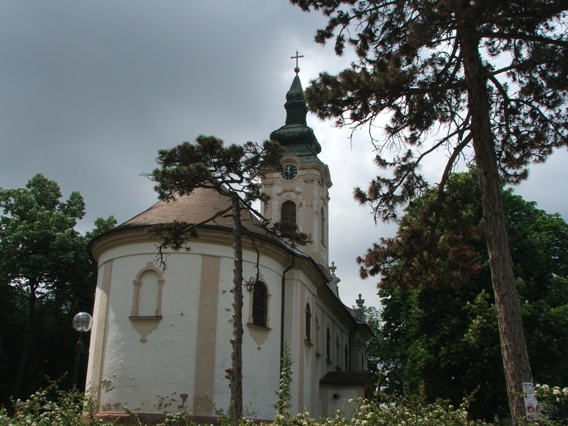
Orthodox Church

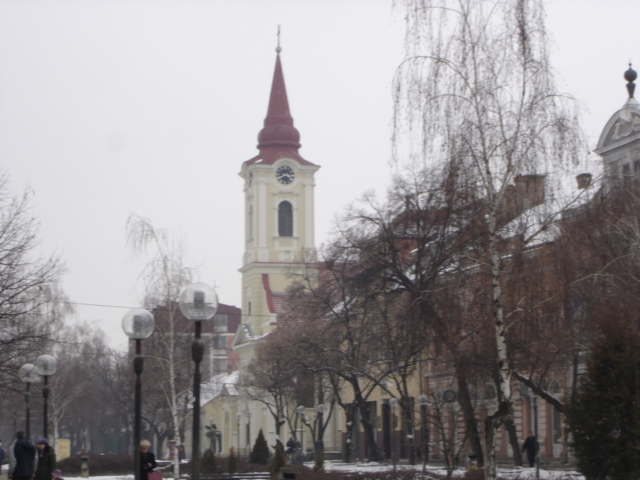
The City Square and the Catholic Church

The history of modern Kikinda can be traced back for 250 years; by 1751–1752, when the area where the city is presently located began to be repopulated. The Serbs settled in two waves. The first settlers were Serbs who served in border patrols of the Habsburg military. They were tasked with protecting the borders against the Ottomans along the rivers of the Moriš and the Tisa. After the Požarevac peace treaty, where an agreement between the Habsburg monarchy and the Ottoman Empire was reached, the Ottomans lost the territory of Banat, which led to huge job losses among the Serb population. As a result, they founded a new settlement in an effort to make a living from agriculture. Some decades later, along with the Serbs, Germans (Banat Swabians), Hungarians, French and Jews also settled the area.

About twenty years after the establishment of the settlement, on 12 November 1774, the Austrian Empress Maria Theresa, by way of a special charter, formed the Velikokikindski privileged district – Regio-privilegiatus Districtus Magnokikindiensis, as a distinct feudal governmental administrative unit with headquarters in Kikinda. Beside Kikinda, the district included another nine settlements of the Serb border military establishments in North and Central Banat: Srpski Krstur, Jozefovo (today part of Novi Kneževac), Mokrin, Karlovo (today part of Novo Miloševo), Bašaid, Vranjevo (today part of Novi Bečej), Melenci, Kumane and Taraš. During that period, the inhabitants of these places had substantial economic and even political privileges within the Habsburg monarchy. The District functioned, with some interruptions, until 1876 when it was abolished, and Kikinda was allocated both organizationally and administratively to the direct authority of the Torontal County with its headquarters in Veliki Bečkerek (today Zrenjanin), which covered most of the territory of present-day Serbian Banat.

In 1848/1849, the famous uprising of the Serbs in Vojvodina took place. Initially, Kikinda's citizens expressed, almost unanimously, social revolt, while later the uprising turned into a national one, and Kikinda became part of the Serbian Voivodship, a Serb autonomous region within the Austrian Empire. During the war, control over the city changed hands between the Serbian and Hungarian governments at the expense of great conflicts, which resulted in suffering and destruction. It was one of the most difficult and most complex periods in the history of Kikinda. Between 1849 and 1860 Kikinda was part of the Voivodeship of Serbia and Temes Banat, a separate Austrian crown land. In 1860, this crown land was abolished, and Kikinda was incorporated into Torontal county, in the Kingdom of Hungary after the compromise of 1867.

A railway connecting Szeged, Kikinda and Timișoara was built in 1857 and is the oldest railway on the territory of present-day Serbia and the entire southeast Europe, predating Belgrade by 27 years. Kikinda had 15,000 inhabitants at the time. The first train arrived on 15 November at 15:00 at the still unfinished railway station. The railway itself was part of a 700 km (430 mi) long railway Vienna-Bratislava-Budapest-Timișoara-Baziaș, a spa town and port on the Danube. Days before the first train arrived, public drummers were announcing the event and huge crowds gathered at the arrival ceremony. But some complained. Farmers whose land was appropriated by the state for the route of the railway were not satisfied with the compensation they received. Others spread stories that the fumes from the locomotive are toxic, that sparks from the wheels will set grain fields on fire or that the sound of locomotive will scare the cattle. However, the railway brought an economic boom to Kikinda, as in the next five years industry began to develop, including steam mills and brickyards. When at the end of 19th century Veliki Bečkerek was linked directly to Szeged, bypassing Kikinda, the economy slowed down. In 1953 the connection with Szeged was cut as the bridge over the river Tisza was demolished. The connection to Timișoara was operational via railbuses until 2015. The Austrian emperor Franz Joseph I visited Kikinda in 1872 arriving by this railway and it was also used for the original Orient Express route. As of 2017, trains operate only as far as Subotica and Zrenjanin.

In 1893, Kikinda was declared a royal free city. At the end of the 19th century Kikinda was the most densely inhabited place in Torontál County, with 22,000 inhabitants. After the declaration of a free city, period from the end of the 19th century to the beginning of the World War I was a peaceful and fruitful one in the history of Kikinda and was marked by a strong economic and urban development of the city. Moreover, the core of the city was formed, and the city received a defined local government in 1895 (statute, senate, town representative, mayor (Karlo Radovan), etc.). According to the 1910 census, the population of Kikinda numbered 26,795 inhabitants, of whom 14,214 (53.00%) spoke Serbian, 5,968 (22.27%) Hungarian, and 5,855 (21.85%) German.

A date around the end of the First World War (20 November 1918) denotes one of the most crucial moments in the modern history of Kikinda. The entry of the Serbian army into the city represented the achievement of the Serbs of Kikinda in striving to unite with Serbia. From 1 December 1918, the city was part of the Kingdom of Serbs, Croats and Slovenes (renamed Yugoslavia in 1929). However, the city suffered greatly in the economic realm, as it was located in the hinterland, between two borders, with lines of communication disconnected. The period between the two world wars was not one of economic prosperity for the city. In 1921, the population of Kikinda numbered 25,774 people and included 15,000 (58%) Serbs and Croats, 5,500 (21%) Germans (Banat Swabians), 4,000 (16%) Hungarians, and 5% Romanians. Between 1918 and 1922, Kikinda was part of Banat county, Between 1922 and 1929 it was part of Belgrade oblast, and between 1929 and 1941 it was part of Danube Banovina.

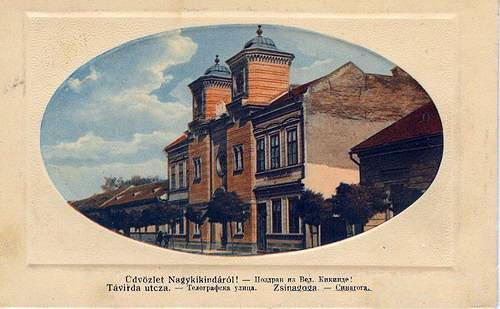
Synagogue in Kikinda razed in 1953

During the Interbellum, numerous public buildings were built. While the Historical Archive and the People's Museum moved into the old district building in 1876, new buildings were constructed for the city administration, other museums, a library, etc. Clergy House was built in 1939. After only twenty years of peace, in 1941 Kikinda entered the stormy period of World War II, during which it was occupied by German troops. The Banat region, which Kikinda belonged to, was made an autonomous region within Serbia and was placed under the control of the region's German minority. The city was liberated on 6 October 1944, and since 1945, it has been part of the Autonomous Province of Vojvodina within the new Socialist Yugoslavia.

During and after the war, the city's economic and political organizational structure significantly changed. In addition, there were major changes in the ethnic structure of the city. The German (about 22%) and Jewish (about 2%) populations vanished. In 1940, there were about 500 Jews in the town. In August 1941, they were deported to the Sajmište death camp near Belgrade and murdered. In 1944, one part of the German population fled the region, together with the defeated German army. Between 1944 and 1948, those who remained were detained in work camps. After the abolition of the camps, most of the remaining German population left for Austria and Germany in search of better living conditions. In 1948, shortly after the end of World War II, Kikinda had a population of 28,070. From the mid-1960s to the mid-1980s, the city saw continuous economic and cultural development: new factories and production plants, new blocks of flats and residential neighbourhoods, various objects of general social interest, and paved streets definitely stressed and formed the urban dimension of Kikinda. In 1971 the city had a population of 37,487.

In March 2016, Kikinda was again granted city status.

== Greater Kikinda area ==
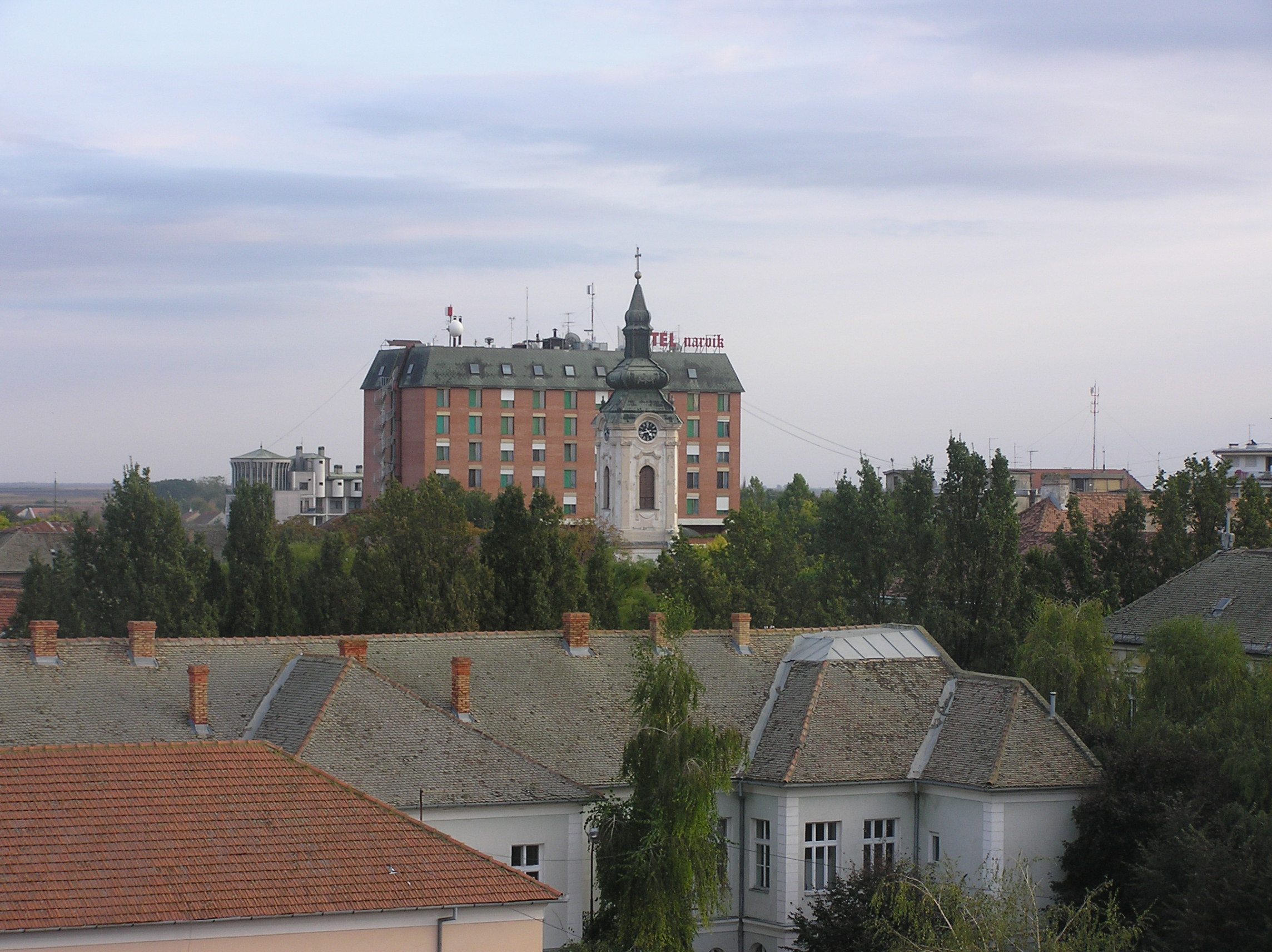
Panorama of Kikinda

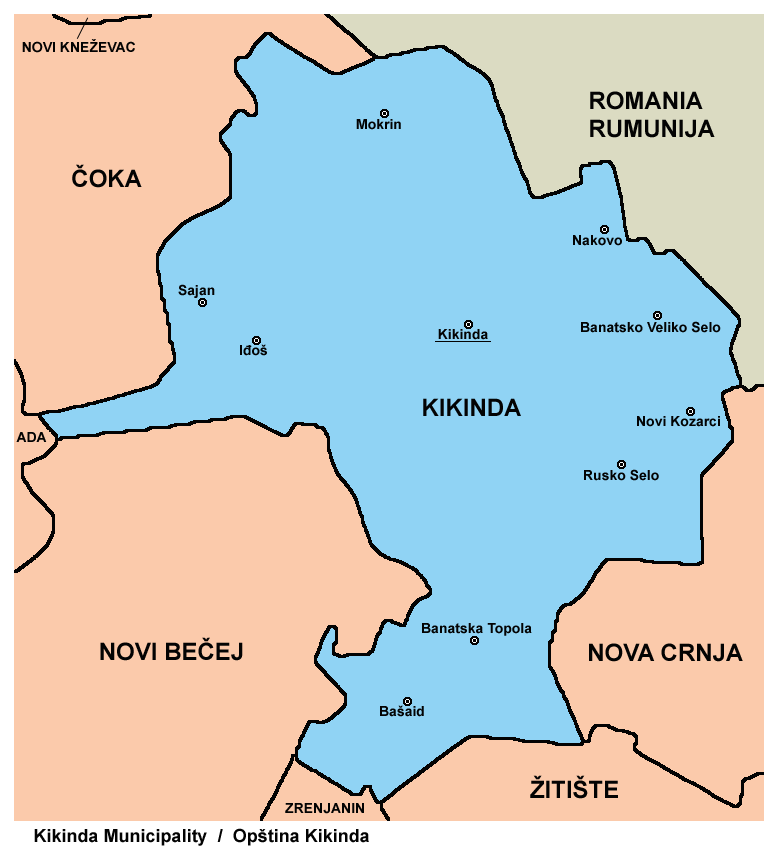
Map of the City of Kikinda

The City of Kikinda comprises the town of Kikinda, nine villages and two hamlets. The nine villages are:

- Banatska Topola
- Banatsko Veliko Selo
- Bašaid
- Iđoš
- Mokrin
- Nakovo
- Novi Kozarci
- Rusko Selo
- Sajan (Hungarian: Szaján)

The two hamlets are:

- Bikač, officially part of Bašaid
- Vincaid, officially part of Banatska Topola

Note: for settlements with a Hungarian majority, the name is also given in Hungarian.

The city belongs to the group of so-called planned organized settlements. Plans of streets and crossroads were completed in the second half of the 18th century according to the standard city plans of the time used for the construction of new settlements in Banat. Those plans defined settlements with regularly lined and wide streets intersecting at right angles, with a central town square, market place, church, city hall, school, inn, etc.

== Demographics ==
Historical population
Year	Pop.	±% p.a.
1948	64,251	—
1953	64,685	+0.13%
1961	68,562	+0.73%
1971	68,915	+0.05%
1981	69,864	+0.14%
1991	69,743	−0.02%
2002	67,002	−0.36%
2011	59,453	−1.32%
2022	49,326	−1.68%

According to the last official census done in 2011, the city of Kikinda has 59,453 inhabitants.

=== Ethnic groups ===
Most of the settlements in the city have an ethnic Serb majority, while one settlement has a Hungarian ethnic majority: Sajan (Hungarian: Szaján). Two others have over 20% of ethnic Hungarian population: Banatska Topola and Rusko Selo.

The ethnic composition of city administrative area:

Ethnic group	Population
Serbs	44,846
Hungarians	7,270
Roma	1,981
Yugoslavs	331
Croats	204
Macedonians	126
Montenegrins	99
Romanians	95
Germans	87
Albanians	75
Muslims	74
Others	4,265
Total	59,453

== Economy ==
The principal branch of the city's economy is agriculture, with its 598.17 square kilometres (230.95 sq mi) of arable land. The annual production of wheat is about 60,000 tons, 114,670 tons of sunflower seeds. Soy, sugar beet and other fruits and vegetables are also produced.

Industrial production includes the production of oil derivatives by the "Naftagas" branch in Kikinda, metal processing, machine tools, special tools, car parts and flexible technologies by the former "Livnica Kikinda" (metal foundry) and IDA-Opel (now owned by Slovenian Cimos Koper), roof tile and brick production by "Toza Marković", the production of chemicals by "MSK" and "Hemik" and the processing of agricultural products by a number of factories.

The following table gives a preview of total number of registered people employed in legal entities per their core activity (as of 2018):

Activity	Total
Agriculture, forestry and fishing	565
Mining and quarrying	102
Manufacturing	4,669
Electricity, gas, steam and air conditioning supply	139
Water supply; sewerage, waste management and remediation activities	221
Construction	532
Wholesale and retail trade, repair of motor vehicles and motorcycles	1,880
Transportation and storage	603
Accommodation and food services	428
Information and communication	149
Financial and insurance activities	175
Real estate activities	34
Professional, scientific and technical activities	329
Administrative and support service activities	428
Public administration and defense; compulsory social security	714
Education	908
Human health and social work activities	1,367
Arts, entertainment and recreation	212
Other service activities	257
Individual agricultural workers	487
Total	14,200

=== Transport ===
Rail line Banatsko Aranđelovo – Kikinda – Romanian border at Jimbolia, part of the former Szeged – Timișoara railway is the second oldest railway in present-day Serbia. The city is also connected by railway to Subotica and to Belgrade via Zrenjanin.

Regional roads connect Kikinda with all the neighbouring cities and villages. Buses operate regularly to the surrounding villages and major domestic and some European cities.

The only transport waterway in the city is the Danube-Tisa-Danube Canal. There is a dock which is used for industrial transport.

There is also the Kikinda Airfield, a recreational aerodrome near the city. The local flying club organizes lessons in parachuting, aviation and space-modeling. "Cropduster" planes are also flown from this airstrip to spray agricultural fields.

== Education ==
Primary schools

There are eight primary schools in the city:

- Đura Jakšić Primary School . Language of instruction: Serbian.
- Feješ Klara Primary School. Language of instruction: Serbian and Hungarian.
- Jovan Popović Primary School. Language of instruction: Serbian.
- Sveti Sava Primary School . Languages of instruction: Serbian and Hungarian.
- Vuk Karadžić Primary School. Language of instruction: Serbian.
- Žarko Zrenjanin Primary School. Language of instruction: Serbian.
- 6 October Special Primary School. School for children with special needs. Language of instruction: Serbian.
- Slobodan Malbaški Primary Music school. Language of instruction: Serbian.

Secondary schools

All secondary schools in Kikinda use Serbian as the language of instruction:

- Dušan Vasiljev Gymnasium, founded in 1858. Students can choose between four main courses: socio-linguistic, mathematics and natural sciences, informatics and general.
- Technical School
- Economics and Trade Secondary School
- Miloš Crnjanski Secondary Vocational School. The school offers courses in food processing, building, and health sciences.
- Higher School for the Education of Teachers

Free schools

- Pionir free school . Integral education. Students learn about technology, ethics and digital humanities. Language of instruction: Serbian and English

== Sports ==
The town's football club OFK Kikinda was founded in 1909 and played in the second tier of Yugoslav football and spent three seasons in the First League of Serbia and Montenegro in the 1990s.

== Culture ==
=== Cultural institutions ===
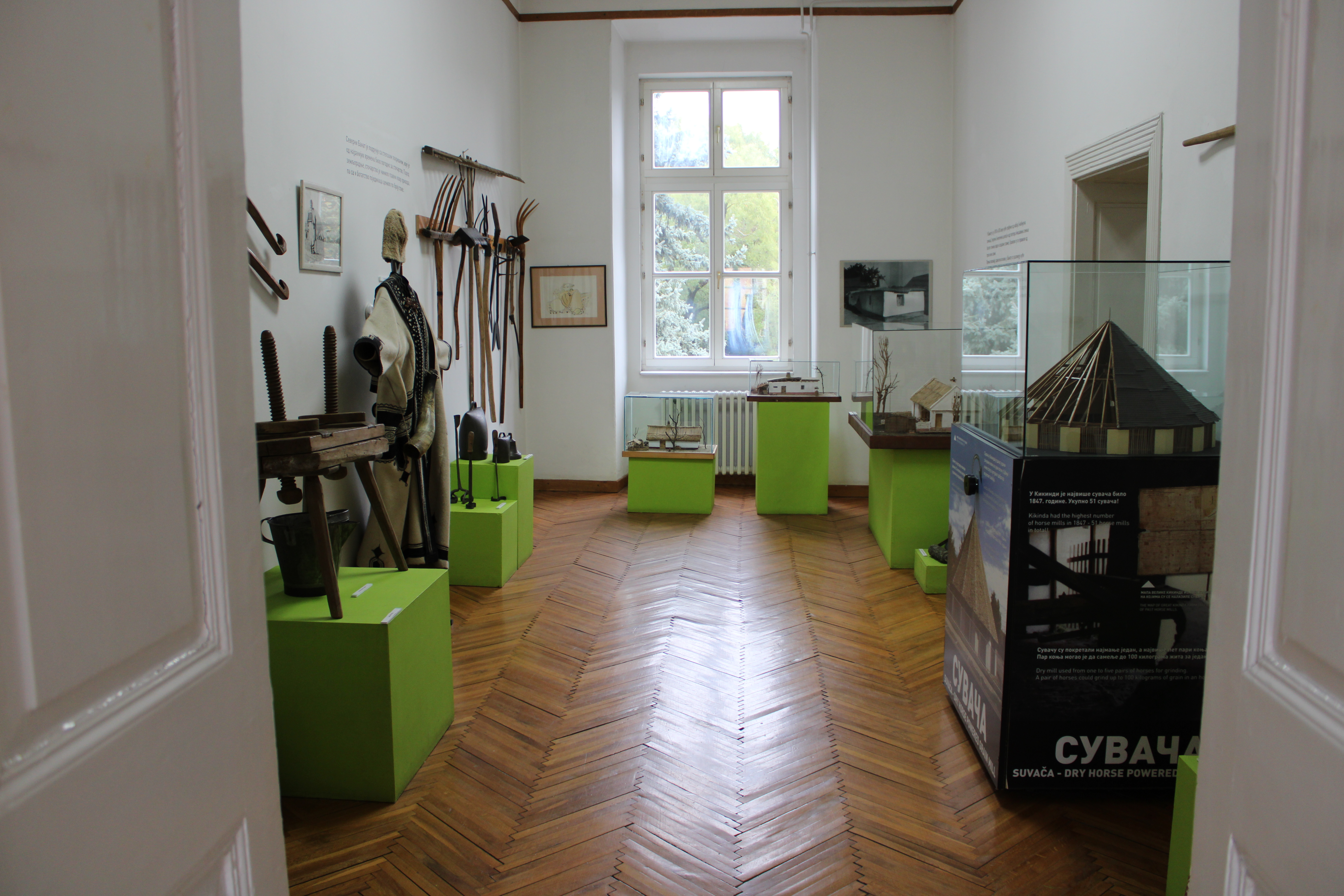
National Museum, Kikinda

Situated in the city square, the building of the National Museum of Kikinda was built in 1839. In the beginning, the building served as the city curia and the seat of the District of Velika Kikinda until its abolishment in 1876. In 1946, the National Museum of Kikinda and the City Archive were founded and housed in the building. The Museum boasts numerous artifacts which are displayed in its four sections: archeological, historical, ethnological and naturalist. As of recently, it also possesses a mammoth skeleton named Kika which was excavated on the grounds of the "Toza Marković" brick factory in 1996.

The Jovan Popović National Library was founded in 1845 as Čitaonica Srbska (Serbian Reading Room). It was renamed in 1952 to Jovan Popović in honor of a prominent poet from Kikinda. Besides serving its primary function of loaning books, the library also organizes literary meetings, book promotions, seminars, lectures, exhibitions, and has published several works.

Although the National Theater in Kikinda was founded only 50 years ago, Kikinda has a long theatrical tradition. Kikinda witnessed its first theatrical play in 1796 in German. The first play in Serbian was performed in 1834. The theater has a continuous program all year round, including the summer when the stage is set up outside, in the yard of the theater.

The most famous band is Downstroy formed in 2004. In 2007, the group was the first in the history of the ex-YU to perform at one of the biggest heavy metal festivals in the world - Wacken Open Air. In 2022, Downstroy received an invitation to perform on the main stage of the EXIT festival, which was the first time a performer from Kikinda had succeeded.

=== Manifestations ===
The Pumpkin Days (Дани лудаје/Dani ludaje in Serbian) are an annual manifestation that takes place in mid-October. Every year people from all over the region gather in Kikinda to take part in a competition of who has the largest pumpkin and longest gourd. The term ludaja is specific to the Kikinda region, while the common Serbian word for pumpkin is bundeva. Kikinda has a special relationship with this plant because throughout its history, the locals used to say that one had to stand on a pumpkin while working in the fields in order to get a clear view of the whole city. This exaggeration is supposed to depict the flatness of the city's territory and symbolize the joy of finding way back home. A local man standing on a pumpkin, dressed in a traditional attire, and with his hand blocking the sun so that he can see into the distance, thus became the symbol of the region. A group of local enthusiasts started the Pumpkin Days celebration in 1986 and it quickly started attracting pumpkin and gourd lovers from all over the country. The three-day event also includes lectures and seminars on the advancement of pumpkin and gourd cultivation, a culinary competition in preparing meals from pumpkins and gourds, children's competitions in creating masks and sculptures, and various concerts and exhibitions. Over the past few years this event has gained prominence and has drawn visitors from Hungary, Romania and the former Yugoslav republics. In 2006 the event celebrated its 20th anniversary and had the largest number of visitors so far, as well as a richer program. A tamburitza festival was included in the event, contributing to the authentic Banat experience.

In 2019, records in both categories were set - the largest pumpkin weighed 639.5 kilograms (1,410 lb), while the longest gourd was 366 centimetres (144 in) in length. However, in 2022, a pumpkin with 716.5 kilograms (1,580 lb) was measured.

Every year, since 1982, six to eight world-renowned sculptors are invited to Kikinda, to the premises of an old production plant of the "Toza Marković" brick factory, to take part at the international symposium of sculpture "Terra". Work area has 600 square metres (6,500 sq ft) and a 2.5 metres (8 ft 2 in) tall furnace for baking sculptures. The symposium takes place throughout the month of July. Over the years, "Terra" has hosted sculptors from all corners of the world who are drawn by the unique and peaceful ambience of the studio. All sculptures are done in terracotta and some have appeared at the Venice Biennale. Over 300 sculptors have so far participated at the symposium and together have produced more than 500 sculptures. The "Terra" museum was opened on 5 December 2017. A building of the old riding hall (manjež), built in 1871, was converted into a museum by sculptor Slobodan Kojić. When built, manjež served for the horse training of the Austro-Hungarian army and was the second largest such facility in the empire, after the one in Vienna. The exhibits, works of over 300 artists from all over the world since 1982, belong both to large and gallery format sculptures. The "Terra" exhibition is the largest collection of large size terracotta sculptures in the world and the first new museum of the contemporary art in Serbia since 1967. Previously proposed locations were within the brickyard complex, old brickyard II and old drier, but the adaptation of manjež began in 2012. There are over 1,000 sculptures in the exhibition space of 2,100 m^{2} (23,000 sq ft). Previously, the collection was shown in Venice, Paris, Ljubljana and Belgrade. Several sculptures are permanently exhibited in the parks of Kikinda and Belgrade, while 5 monumental ones were donated to Venice after the 1999 Venice Biennale.

=== Media ===
Newspapers

- Nove Kikindske Novine, weekly newspaper. Printed in Serbian, using the Cyrillic alphabet, with a supplement in Hungarian.

TV stations

- TV VK, independent TV station, ceased broadcasting in November 2016.
- TV Kikinda (ex TV Rubin), TV station favoring the local government.

Radio stations

- VK Radio (frequency: 98.3 MHz), independent regional radio station, ceased broadcasting in November 2016.
- Radio Kikinda (frequency: 93.3 МHz, ceased broadcasting in January 2016.), state-owned local station, which broadcast programs in both Serbian and Hungarian
- Radio Ami (frequency: 89.7 МHz), local commercial pop music radio station

== Tourism ==
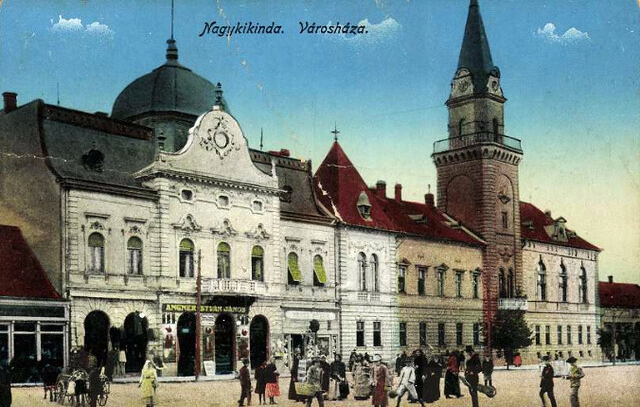
Townhall

Before the break-up of former Yugoslavia, hunting tourism was widespread in Kikinda. There are a number of hunting grounds in the city covering an area of 300 square kilometres (116 sq mi), mostly around the banks of the Danube-Tisa-Danube Canal, where rabbits, pheasants and deer are hunted.

On the location of the former clay pit of the "Toza Marković" company, an artificial lake was created. Located at the southern entrance into the town, it was named Plava banja ("Blue Spa"). Though it is not officially classified as a spa, the water is highly mineralized, microbiologically suitable for swimming and chemically has an elevated levels of sulfates and chlorides, so as higher electroconductivity and pH values. That means the water may be beneficial for the skin and some skin diseases, like the eczema. Until the early 2000s, the lake was arranged with numerous recreational activities and was visited by several thousand people daily. It was busy in the evenings as the lake was place for many concerts and other artistic and entertaining happenings. As the lake is on the lot of "Toza Marković", new owners stopped all that and by 2017 the lake was neglected and without even the basic infrastructure (showers, toilets, etc.). However, the locals still visit the lake, though on a much smaller scale. In the summer of 2017, the lake shores were cleaned from garbage and vegetation.

There is another lake, Staro jezero ("Old Lake"), in the town itself. It is a remnant of the former river Galacka, part of the Mureș river system. The river was diverted at a time, partially channeled and conducted underground, so there is no river in Kikinda today. In the city, there is a park called Blandaš, which was declared a natural monument. The tree line along the 2 km (1.2 mi) long Generala Drapšina Street is made up of 400 trees, and the street was declared the 22nd most beautiful street in the world by the Architecture and Design magazine. The tree line was planted after the World War II, even before the war ended in the rest of Europe and Yugoslavia. It is believed that the seedlings were a gift from the U.S. president Franklin D. Roosevelt, due to his friendship with Mihajlo Pupin.

In the vicinity of Kikinda is the Copper Age kurgan of Kinđa, which possibly gave name to the city.

=== Main sights ===
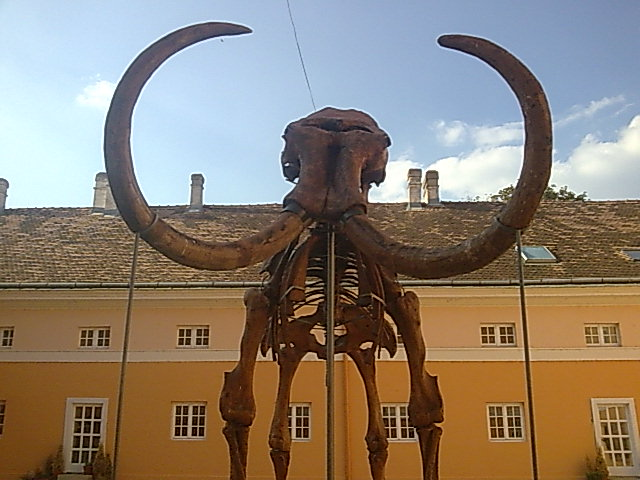
Kika the mammoth, faithful replica reconstruction of the mammoth skeleton excavated in 1996, National Museum of Kikinda. Original bones can be seen in the museum.

The Suvača is a horse-powered dry mill. Kikinda has one of the three remaining such mills in Europe (the other two being in Szarvas, Hungary and Otok). There were many mills like this in the city: 17 in 1781, 32 in 1801, with the largest recorded number being 51 in 1847. The only remaining mill was built in 1899 and was operational until 1945.

Located in the center of the square, the Serbian Orthodox church was built in 1769. The icons of the iconostasis were done by Jakov Orfelin (nephew of Zacharius Orfelin) in 1773. Teodor Ilić Češljar is the author of the two large wall paintings "The Last Supper" and "Ascension of Jesus Christ" (1790). Both, the late baroque iconostasis and the wall paintings show significant influence of western European art of the period. New church bells were installed in 1899.

The small Vodice church was built in 1865. On an elevated plateau above it, four water wells were dug. The complex was declared a cultural monument. The Serbian Orthodox Holy Trinity monastery is located in the southern outskirts of the city. It was built between 1885 and 1887 as a foundation of Melanija Nikolić-Gajčić. The construction of the Roman Catholic Church in Kikinda was started in 1808 and completed in 1811.

According to a popular belief, the treasure of Attila the Hun is buried somewhere on the territory of the city of Kikinda.

Fossil remains of a mammoth, named Kika, were discovered in 1996 in the clay pit of the "Toza Marković" company. Kika was a female, 4.7 m (15 ft) tall, 7 m (23 ft) long with an estimated weight of 7 t (6.9 long tons; 7.7 short tons). The tusks are 3.5 m (11 ft) long. That makes Kika one of the largest mammoth specimens ever discovered. It is still not determined to which mammoth species it belongs.

Among the birdwatchers Kikinda is known as the prime hotspot for observing winter roosts of long-eared owl with large number of individuals. Kikinda has been nicknamed the Serbian owl capital. The roosts are situated in city parks so they are easily accessible. In November 2017, 238 owls were numbered while the record was set in 2009 when 743 birds were counted in the town. At one point, 145 owls were counted on only one tree. The BBC crews visited Kikinda in 2015 and 2018, filming documentaries about the wild animals in urban areas and focusing on the owls.

== Notable citizens ==
- Miroslav Mika Antić, poet
- Radivoj Berbakov, painter
- Albert Bogen (Albert Bógathy; 1882–1961), Kikinda-born Austrian Olympic silver medalist saber fencer
- Predrag Bubalo, politician, former Government minister
- Dajana Butulija, professional basketball player, Olympic bronze medalist and European champion
- Branimir Brstina, actor, from nearby Banatsko Novo Selo
- Vesna Čipčić, actress, was raised and schooled in Kikinda
- Jovan Ćirilov, dramaturge, poet, writer
- Dimitrije Injac, professional football player
- Đura Jakšić, poet and painter, lived in Kikinda for some time
- Branislav Lala Kovačev, jazz musician, drummer
- Milivoj Jugin, aeronautical engineer
- Mladen Krstajić, former football player of football club Partizan Belgrade
- Maja Latinović, supermodel
- Jovan Popović, poet
- Srđan Srdić, writer
- Vasa Stajić, writer and philosopher (from nearby Mokrin)
- Aleksandra Stanaćev, basketball player, born in Kikinda
- Srđan V. Tešin, writer and journalist
- Dušan Vasiljev, poet
- Goran Živkov, politician

== Twin towns – sister cities ==
Kikinda is twinned with:

Narvik, Norway; Nazareth Illit, Israel; Bihać, Bosnia and Herzegovina; Prijedor, Bosnia and Herzegovina; Reșița, Romania	Jimbolia, Romania; Medgidia, Romania; Kiskunfélegyháza, Hungary; Kondoros, Hungary; Nagydobos, Hungary	Szolnok, Hungary; Žilina, Slovakia; Silistra, Bulgaria

== Awards ==
In 2003, the Organization for Security and Co-operation in Europe Mission to Serbia awarded the Municipality of Kikinda the Municipal Award for Tolerance.

== Climate ==
Climate in this area has mild differences between highs and lows, and there is adequate rainfall year-round. The Köppen Climate Classification subtype for this climate is "Cfa" (Humid subtropical climate).

Climate data for Kikinda (1991–2020, extremes 1961–present)
Month	Jan	Feb	Mar	Apr	May	Jun	Jul	Aug	Sep	Oct	Nov	Dec	Year
Record high °C (°F)	17.7 (63.9)	21.4 (70.5)	28.3 (82.9)	31.2 (88.2)	33.7 (92.7)	37.5 (99.5)	40.0 (104.0)	39.7 (103.5)	37.4 (99.3)	30.9 (87.6)	25.3 (77.5)	19.7 (67.5)	40.0 (104.0)
Mean daily maximum °C (°F)	3.6 (38.5)	6.4 (43.5)	12.3 (54.1)	18.3 (64.9)	23.1 (73.6)	26.9 (80.4)	29.0 (84.2)	29.3 (84.7)	23.9 (75.0)	18.0 (64.4)	11.0 (51.8)	4.4 (39.9)	17.2 (63.0)
Daily mean °C (°F)	0.4 (32.7)	2.1 (35.8)	6.8 (44.2)	12.5 (54.5)	17.4 (63.3)	21.2 (70.2)	22.8 (73.0)	22.6 (72.7)	17.3 (63.1)	11.9 (53.4)	6.6 (43.9)	1.5 (34.7)	11.9 (53.4)
Mean daily minimum °C (°F)	−2.5 (27.5)	−1.6 (29.1)	1.9 (35.4)	6.7 (44.1)	11.4 (52.5)	15.0 (59.0)	16.4 (61.5)	16.2 (61.2)	11.9 (53.4)	7.2 (45.0)	3.1 (37.6)	−1.2 (29.8)	7.0 (44.6)
Record low °C (°F)	−29.8 (−21.6)	−25.7 (−14.3)	−20.3 (−4.5)	−6.5 (20.3)	−0.5 (31.1)	4.0 (39.2)	7.1 (44.8)	6.0 (42.8)	−1.4 (29.5)	−7.7 (18.1)	−13.8 (7.2)	−22.4 (−8.3)	−29.8 (−21.6)
Average precipitation mm (inches)	34.6 (1.36)	32.2 (1.27)	34.8 (1.37)	41.3 (1.63)	60.8 (2.39)	73.9 (2.91)	61.5 (2.42)	46.3 (1.82)	51.7 (2.04)	49.0 (1.93)	41.5 (1.63)	43.6 (1.72)	571.2 (22.49)
Average precipitation days (≥ 0.1 mm)	12.7	11.6	10.6	10.8	12.6	11.9	9.8	8.1	10.1	9.9	10.9	13.7	132.7
Average snowy days	6.0	5.4	2.9	0.3	0.0	0.0	0.0	0.0	0.0	0.0	1.8	5.2	21.6
Average relative humidity (%)	85.4	79.3	69.3	64.4	64.6	65.6	63.4	63.5	69.4	75.0	81.3	86.8	72.3
Mean monthly sunshine hours	72.1	103.5	164.8	212.8	261.4	283.8	314.1	300.2	209.6	165.2	98.7	60.0	2,246.2
Source: Republic Hydrometeorological Service of Serbia

== See also ==
- List of places in Serbia
- List of cities, towns and villages in Vojvodina
