= List of palaces and manor houses in Serbia =

This is a list of palaces in Serbia. The list includes preserved, restored, and remains (ruins) of palaces (palate), châteaux and castles (dvorci and zamci), courts (dvorovi), residences (konaci), villas (vile), etc. There are over 200 palaces in Serbia, including manor houses. Palaces in Serbia are preserved from the Roman, Byzantine, medieval Serbian and post-Ottoman eras, with most being built after the 16th century. The majority of palaces have been renovated throughout history, as well as changing ownership, use, or original intent. Many palaces are used for different institutions, such as the Obrenović Palace originally being the royal palace of the Obrenović dynasty, now housing the City Assembly of Belgrade. This list does not include military castles and fortifications, which are listed in a separate article.

== List ==
Palaces located within Kosovo are indicated in grey.

Image	Name	Settlement	Municipality	District	Established	Status	Type
	Aleksandar Pavlović's Vila	Zlatibor	Čajetina	Zlatibor District	1937	Preserved	Villa
	Aleksinac City Hall	Aleksinac	Aleksinac	Nišava District	1848	Restored	Palace and town hall
	Amidža Residence	Kragujevac	Kragujevac	Šumadija District	1819–1824	Preserved	Palace and museum
	Apatin City Hall	Apatin	Apatin	West Bačka District	1907–1909	Preserved	Palace and town hall
	Bečej City Hall	Bečej	Bečej	South Bačka District	1880	Preserved	Palace and town hall
	Belimarković Castle	Vrnjačka Banja	Vrnjačka Banja	Raška District	1882–1887	Restored	Manor house
	Bishop's Court, Novi Sad	Novi Sad	Novi Sad	South Bačka District	1899–1901	Preserved	Palace
	Bishop's Court, Prizren	Prizren	Prizren	Prizren District	1980	Restored	Palace
	Bishop's Palace, Vršac	Vršac	Vršac	South Banat District	1750–1757	Preserved	Palace
	Captain Miša's Mansion	Belgrade	Stari Grad	Belgrade	1858–1863	Preserved	Mansion, school and administrative building
	Damaski Castle	Hajdučica	Plandište	South Banat District	1911	Preserved	Manor house
	Danijel Castle	Konak	Sečanj	Central Banat District	1898	Preserved	Manor house
	Danijel Family Castle	Stari Lec	Plandište	South Banat District	19th century	Preserved	Manor house
	Danube Banovina Palace	Novi Sad	Novi Sad	South Bačka District	1935–1940	Preserved	Palace and Parliament
	Dunđerski Castle	Čelarevo	Bačka Palanka	South Bačka District	1834–1837	Restored (Dilapidated)	Manor house
	Dunđerski-Stratimirović Castle, Kulpin	Kulpin	Bački Petrovac	South Bačka District	1826	Restored	Manor house
	Eđšeg Castle	Novi Sad	Novi Sad	South Bačka District	1889–1890	Restored	Manor house and cultural center
	Elek's Villa	Zrenjanin	Zrenjanin	Central Banat District	1911	Restored	Villa
	Ertl Villa	Odžaci	Odžaci	West Bačka District	20th century	Preserved	Villa and school
	Fantast Castle	Bečej	Bečej	South Bačka District	1919–1925	Preserved	Manor house
	Fernbach Castle, Aleksa Šantić	Aleksa Šantić	Sombor	West Bačka District	1906	Ruins	Manor house
	Finance Palace	Zrenjanin	Zrenjanin	Central Banat District	1893—1894	Preserved	Palace and museum
	First Kragujevac Gymnasium	Kragujevac	Kragujevac	Šumadija District	1830–1833	Preserved	Palace and school
	Fritz-Hristić Castle	Bačko Novo Selo	Bač	South Bačka District	1900	Ruins	Manor house
	Hadik Castle (Chotek Castle)	Futog, Novi Sad	Novi Sad	South Bačka District	1777	Preserved	Manor house
	Ilion Palace	Sremski Karlovci	Sremski Karlovci	South Bačka District	1836–1848	Restored	Palace
	Ján Kollár Gymnasium and Students' Home	Kulpin	Bački Petrovac	South Bačka District	1919	Preserved	Palace, school and dormitory
	Jovan Jovanović Zmaj Gymnasium	Novi Sad	Novi Sad	South Bačka District	1899-1900	Preserved	Palace and school
	Kapetanovo Castle	Stari Lec	Plandište	South Banat District	1904	Preserved	Manor house
	Karačonji Castle	Novo Miloševo	Novi Bečej	Central Banat District	1857	Dilapidated	Manor house
	Karađorđe's Home, Rača	Rača	Rača	Šumadija District	1932	Preserved (Dilapidated)	Former orphanage, school and migrant center
	Karlovci Gymnasium	Sremski Karlovci	Sremski Karlovci	South Bačka District	1891	Preserved	Palace and school
	King Petar I Karađorđević House	Belgrade	Savski Venac	Belgrade	1896	Preserved	Château
	Kiš Family Castle	Elemir	Zrenjanin	Central Banat District	1795-1796	Demolished in 1936	Manor house
	Kikinda City Hall	Kikinda	Kikinda	North Banat District	1893	Preserved	Palace and town hall
	Kruševac City Hall	Kruševac	Kruševac	Rasina District	1904	Preserved	Palace and town hall
	Lazar Castle, Ečka (Kaštel Castle)	Ečka	Zrenjanin	Central Banat District	1816–1820	Restored	Manor house and hotel
	Lazarević Family Palace	Veliko Središte	Vršac	South Banat District	19th century	Restored	Manor house
	Lujza Villa	Palić	Subotica	North Bačka District	1892	Preserved	Villa
	Marcibanji Castle (Lederer Castle)	Čoka	Čoka	South Banat District	1781	Preserved (Dilapidated)	Manor house and Town hall
	Marcibanji-Karačonji Castle	Sremska Kamenica, Novi Sad	Novi Sad	South Bačka District	1797—1811	Restored	Manor house and school
	Morava Banovina Palace	Niš	Niš	Nišava District	1882–1886	Preserved	Palace, administrative building, academic library and chamber of commerce
	National Assembly House	Belgrade	Stari Grad	Belgrade	1907–1936	Preserved	Palace and Parliament
	Niš City Hall	Niš	Niš	Nišava District	1924–1925	Preserved	Palace and town hall
	Novi Dvor (New Palace)	Belgrade	Stari Grad	Belgrade	1911–1922	Restored	Palace and presidential seat
	Novi Sad City Hall	Novi Sad	Novi Sad	South Bačka District	1893–1895	Preserved	Palace and town hall
	Obrenović Summer Palace	Aranđelovac	Aranđelovac	Šumadija District	1859	Dilapidated	Palace
	Villa Zlatni Breg (Obrenović Summerhouse)	Smederevo	Smederevo	Podunavlje District	1865	Preserved	Villa
	Pál Kray's Castle	Bačka Topola	Bačka Topola	South Bačka District	19th century	Restored	Manor house and museum
	Palace of Serbia	Belgrade	New Belgrade	Belgrade	1947–1959	Preserved	Palace
	Pasha's Residence, Vranje	Vranje	Vranje	Pčinja District	1765	Preserved	Palace and museum
	Patriarchate Building	Belgrade	Stari Grad	Belgrade	1932–1935	Preserved	Palace
	Patriarchate Court	Sremski Karlovci	Sremski Karlovci	South Bačka District	1892-1895	Preserved	Palace and museum
	Pin's Villa	Zrenjanin	Zrenjanin	Central Banat District	1894	Ruins	Villa
	Požarevac City Hall	Požarevac	Požarevac	Braničevo District	1888–1889	Preserved	Palace and town hall
	Prokuplje City Hall	Prokuplje	Prokuplje	Toplica District	1909–1911	Restored	Palace and town hall
	Prince Aleksandar's Castle (Prince's Castle)	Brestovačka Banja	Bor	Bor District	1856	Restored	Palace and museum
	Residence of Prince Mihailo	Kragujevac	Kragujevac	Šumadija District	1860	Preserved	Palace and museum
	Residence of Prince Miloš	Belgrade	Topčider	Belgrade	1831–1833	Preserved	Palace and museum
	Residence of Princess Ljubica	Belgrade	Stari Grad	Belgrade	1829–1830	Preserved	Palace and museum
	Rizenfelder Villa	Kikinda	Kikinda	North Banat District	20th century	Preserved	Villa and clinic
	Kraljevski Dvor (Royal Palace), Dedinje Royal Compound	Belgrade	Savski Venac	Belgrade	1924–1929	Preserved	Palace
	Ruthenian Court	Šid	Šid	Srem District	1780	Preserved	Palace
	Saint Arsenije Clerical High School	Sremski Karlovci	Sremski Karlovci	South Bačka District	1900–1902	Preserved	Palace and school
	Serbian Academy of Sciences and Arts Building	Belgrade	Stari Grad	Belgrade	1914–1924	Preserved	Palace, museum and national academy
	Sečenji Castle	Temerin	Temerin	South Bačka District	1795	Preserved	Manor house and school
	Senta City Hall	Senta	Senta	North Banat District	1912–1914	Preserved	Palace and town hall
	Servijski Family Castle	Novi Kneževac	Novi Kneževac	South Banat District	1793	Restored	Manor house
	Simić Residence (Old Residence)	Belgrade	Stari Grad	Belgrade	1835–1839	Demolished in 1904	Palace
	Smederevo Gymnasium	Smederevo	Smederevo	Podunavlje District	1871	Preserved	Palace and school
	Sombor City Hall	Sombor	Sombor	West Bačka District	1805–1808	Preserved	Palace and town hall
	Sombor Old City Hall	Sombor	Sombor	West Bačka District	1749	Preserved	Palace and town hall
	Spitzer Castle	Beočin	Beočin	South Bačka District	1890—1892	Ruins	Manor house
	Sremski Karlovci City Hall	Sremski Karlovci	Sremski Karlovci	South Bačka District	1808–1811	Restored	Palace and town hall
	Sremska Mitrovica Gymnasium	Sremska Mitrovica	Sremska Mitrovica	Srem District	1838	Preserved	Palace and school
	Stanković Villa	Čortanovci	Inđija	Srem District	1930	Preserved	Villa
	Stari Dvor (Old Palace)	Belgrade	Stari Grad	Belgrade	1882–1884	Restored	Palace and town hall
	Subotica City Hall	Subotica	Subotica	North Bačka District	1908–1912	Preserved	Palace and town hall
	Subotica Gymnasium	Subotica	Subotica	North Bačka District	1896	Preserved	Palace and school
	Subotica Old City Hall	Subotica	Subotica	North Bačka District	1826–1828	Demolished in 1908	Palace and town hall
	Šlos Castle	Golubinci	Stara Pazova	Srem District	18th century	Preserved	Manor house
	Tito's Villa, Zlatibor	Zlatibor	Čajetina	Zlatibor District	1937	Preserved	Villa
	Užice Gymnasium	Užice	Užice	Zlatibor District	1838–1839	Preserved	Palace and school
	Valjevo Gymnasium	Valjevo	Valjevo	Kolubara District	1906	Preserved	Palace and school
	Vlajkovac Castle	Vlajkovac	Vršac	South Banat District	1859	Ruins	Château
	Vlaškalić Villa	Mošorin	Titel	South Bačka District	1926–1928	Preserved	Villa
	Vršac City Hall	Vršac	Vršac	South Banat District	1860	Preserved	Palace and town hall
	Beli Dvor (White Palace), Dedinje Royal Compound	Belgrade	Savski Venac	Belgrade	1934–1937	Preserved	Palace
	Zemun Gymnasium	Belgrade	Zemun	Belgrade	1879	Preserved	Palace and school
	Zrenjanin City Hall	Zrenjanin	Zrenjanin	Central Banat District	1885–1887	Preserved	Palace and town hall
	Zrenjanin Palace of Justice	Zrenjanin	Zrenjanin	Central Banat District	1906—1908	Preserved	Palace and courthouse

== See also ==
- Cultural Heritage of Serbia
- List of World Heritage Sites in Serbia
- Immovable Cultural Heritage of Great Importance (Serbia)
- List of Serbian royal residences
- List of cities in Serbia
- List of fortifications in Serbia
