= Šalinac Grove =

Protected area in Serbia

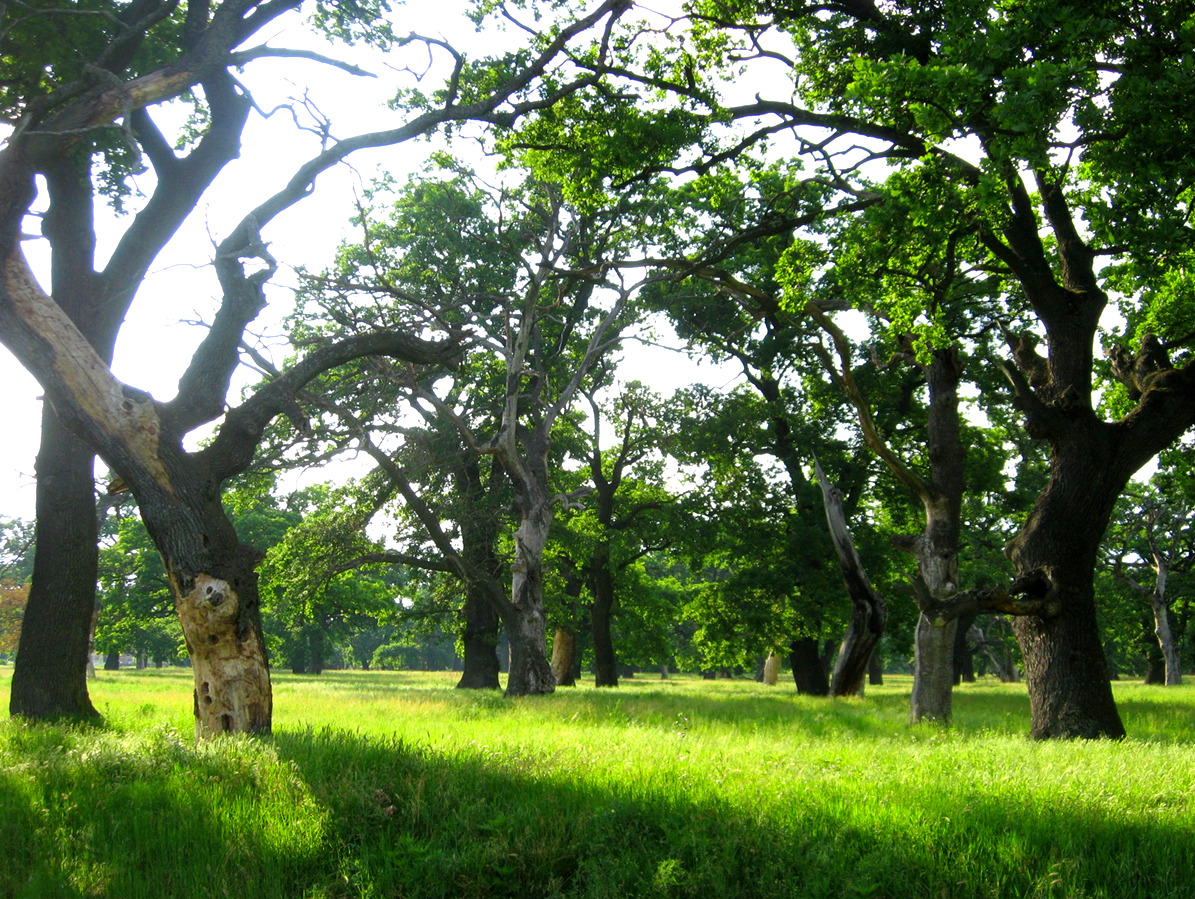
- Šalinac Grove

- Location within Serbia
- Coordinates: 44.702582°N 21.0465431°E

Šalinac Grove (Serbian: Шалиначки луг / Šalinački lug) is a protected area in Serbia which contains the last remnant of the oak-and-ash forests which until several hundred years ago covered the flooded areas in the valleys of the Velika Morava and the Danube. It is a real rarity not only in Serbia but in the wider area of the Balkan Peninsula.

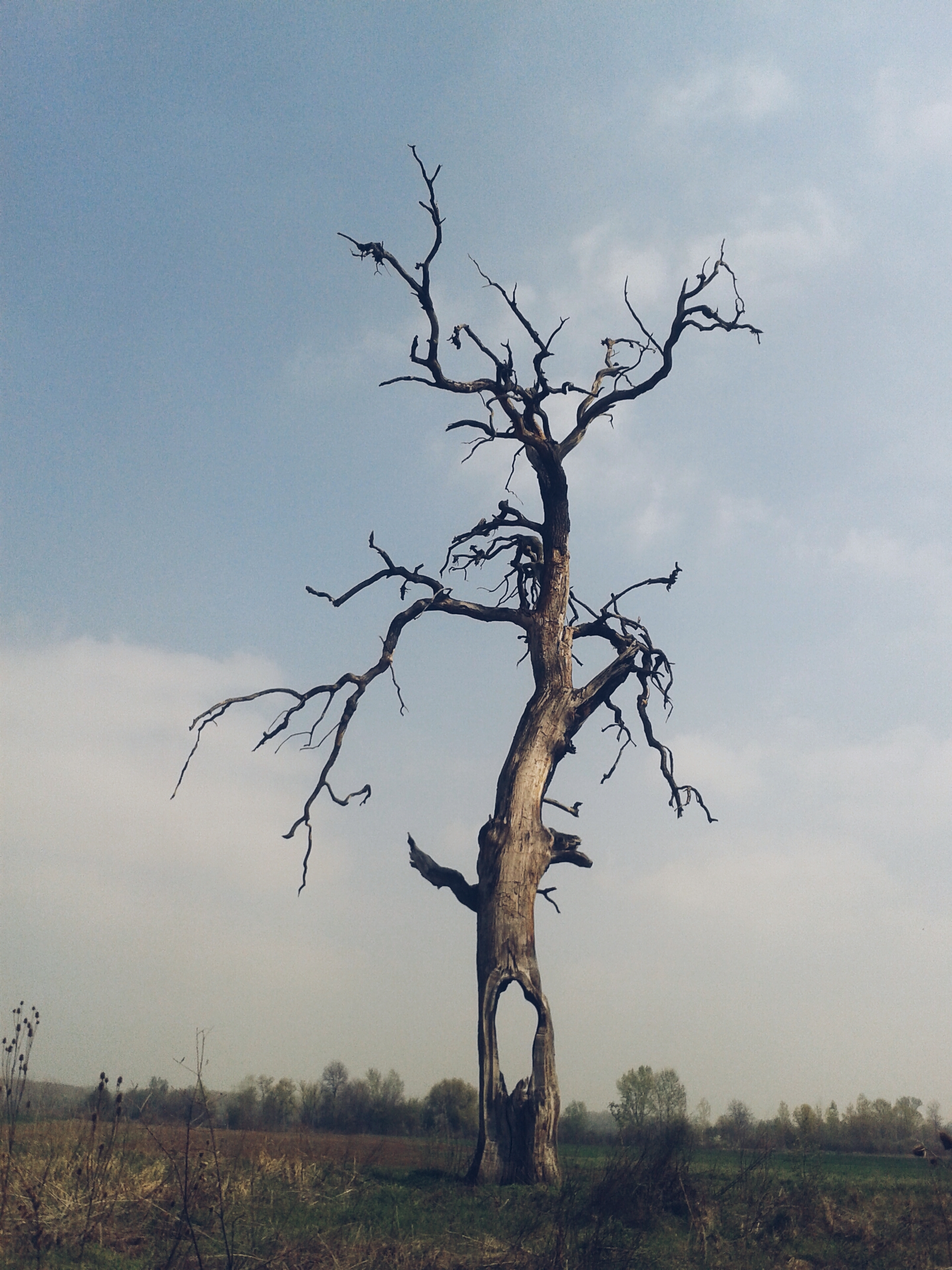
Wood in Šalinac Grove

It is situated 10 kilometres (6.2 mi) east of Smederevo, on the vast plain of the Godomin Field (Serbian: Годоминско поље / Godominsko polje); the plain itself came to exist as a result of floods of the river Velika Morava in the area where it flows into the Danube. The grove is surrounded by the settlements of Šalinac and Kulič, and also - in a wide bend - by a former meander of the Velika Morava which is now an oxbow lake.

It contains a tall, homogeneous stand of trees which are almost the same age, including about 200 centennial marsh oak trees (Quercus robur), once accompanied by field ash trees (Fraxinus angustifolia). The protected area covers 19 hectares (47 acres).

The grove's age is estimated at 200–300 years. The average size of the oak trees is:

Height of tree trunks	17.58 metres (57.7 ft)
Radius of tree tops	15.43 metres (50.6 ft)
Volume of tree trunks	4.14 metres (13.6 ft)
Radius of tree trunks	1.32 metres (4.3 ft)
