= Vucak =

Vucak may refer to:

- Vučak (disambiguation)
- Vuçak, a village in the municipality of Drenas, Kosovo
