= Vučak =

Vučak may refer to:

== Croatia ==
- Vučak (Donja Stubica), village in the town of Donja Stubica

== Serbia ==
- Vučak (Glogovac), village in the municipality of Glogovac
- Vučak (Ivanjica), village in the municipality of Ivanjica
- Vučak (Kruševac), village in the municipality of Kruševac
- Vučak (Smederevo), village in the municipality of Smederevo

== Kosovo ==
- Vuçak, a village in the municipality of Drenas
