= List of forests in Serbia =

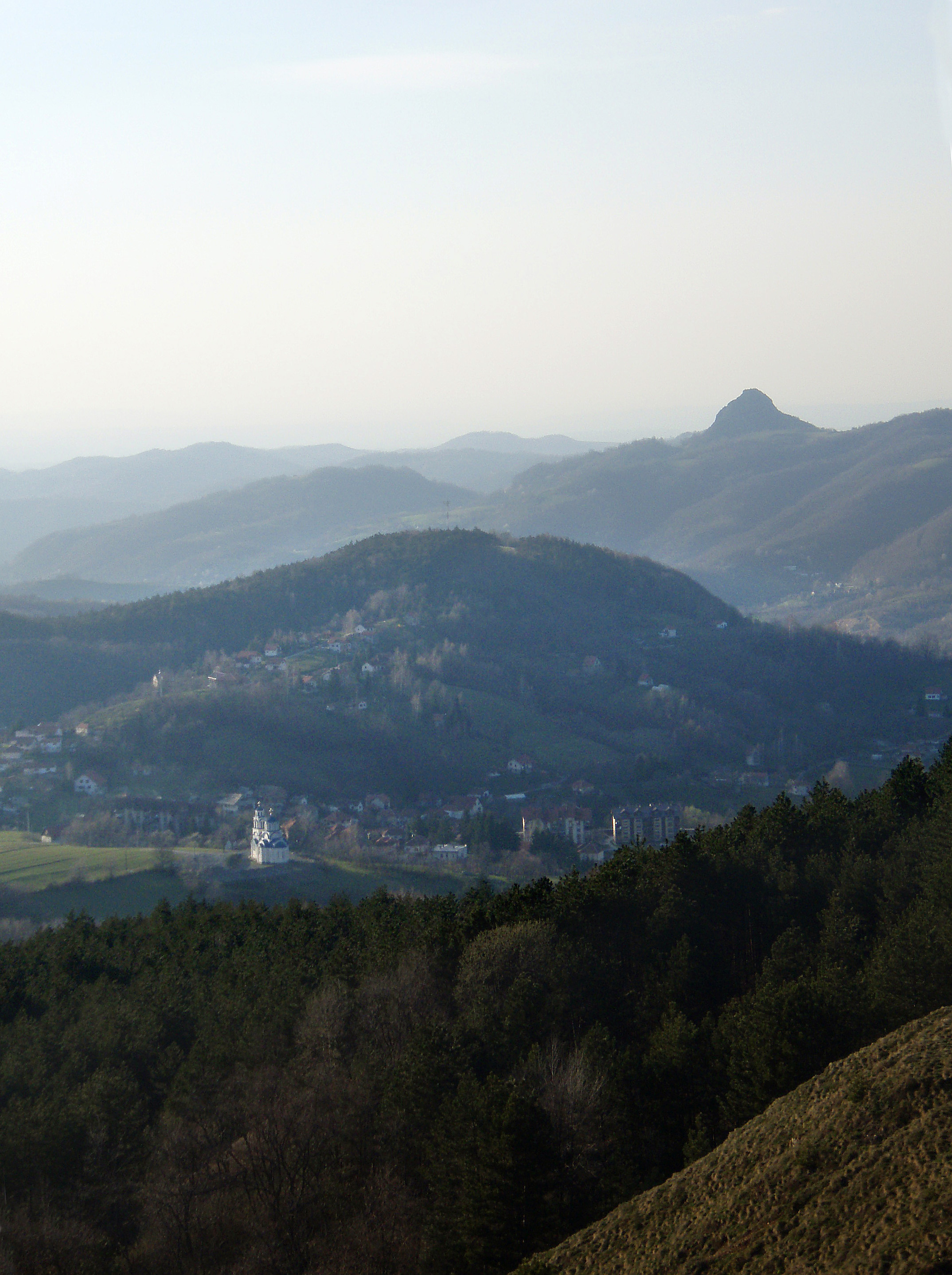
Rudnik mountain forests

This is a list of forests in Serbia.

- Košutnjak
- Molin Forest
- Topčider
- Rudnik
- Radovanjski Lug
- Šalinac Grove
- Borkovac
