= Lists of forests =

This article lists lists of forests.

== By country ==
- Forests of Australia
- List of Brazilian National Forests
- List of forests in Canada
- List of forests in Denmark
- List of forests in France
- List of forests in Iceland
- List of forests in India
- List of forests in Ireland
- List of forests in Israel
- List of Liberian national forests
- List of forests in Lithuania
- Forests of Mexico
- Forests of Poland
- List of forests in Serbia
- List of forests of South Africa
- Forests of Sweden
- List of forest parks of Thailand
- List of forests in the United Kingdom
- List of national forests of the United States

=== By U.S. state ===
- List of Alabama state forests
- List of Alaska state forests
- List of Arkansas state forests
- List of California state forests
- List of Colorado state forests
- List of Connecticut state forests
- List of Delaware state forests
- List of Florida state forests
- List of Georgia state forests
- List of Idaho state forests
- List of Illinois state forests
- List of Indiana state forests
- List of Iowa state forests
- List of Kentucky state forests
- List of Louisiana state forests
- List of Maine state forests
- List of Maryland state forests
- List of Massachusetts state forests
- List of Michigan state forests
- List of Minnesota state forests
- List of Missouri state forests
- List of forests in Montana
- List of New Hampshire state forests
- List of New Jersey state forests
- List of New York state forests
- List of North Carolina state forests
- List of Ohio state forests
- List of Oregon state forests
- List of Pennsylvania state forests
- List of Rhode Island state forests
- List of South Carolina state forests
- List of Tennessee state forests
- List of Texas state forests
- List of Vermont state forests
- List of Virginia state forests
- List of Washington state forests
- List of West Virginia state forests
- List of Wisconsin state forests

== See also ==
- List of countries by forest area
