= Kulič =

Kulič Кулич
- Village (Selo)
- Location within Serbia
- Coordinates: 44°41′06″N 21°00′43″E
- Country: Serbia
- District: Podunavlje
- Municipality: Smederevo

Population (2022)
  - Total: 229
- Time zone: UTC+1 (CET)
  - Summer (DST): UTC+2 (CEST)
- Area code: +381 26
- Car plates: SD

Kulič (Serbian Cyrillic: Кулич) is a village in the municipality of Smederevo, Serbia. The settlement is in the period 1959–1997 year was part of the settlement Šalinac, before 1959 it was an independent settlement. Officially recognized as an independent settlement 2011. According to the 2011 census, the village has a population of 232 people.

Near the village located is a fortress Kulič.

== See also ==
- Populated places in Serbia
