= Vrbovac (Smederevo) =

Vrbovac Врбовац
- Village (Selo)
- Location within Serbia
- Coordinates: 44°34′22″N 20°57′10″E
- Country: Serbia
- District: Podunavlje District
- Municipality: Smederevo

Population (2022)
  - Total: 855
- Time zone: UTC+1 (CET)
  - Summer (DST): UTC+2 (CEST)

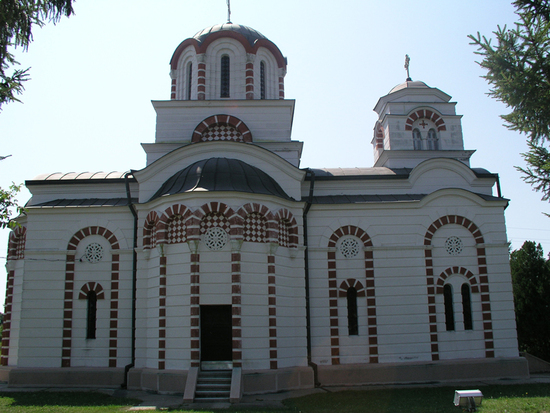
Church of the Holy Prophet Jeremiah in Vrbovec

Vrbovac is a village in the municipality of Smederevo, Serbia. According to the 2002 census, the village has a population of 1108 people.
