= Vuçak Fortress =

Archaeological site in Kosovo

Coordinates: 42°36′23″N 20°49′28″E

- Kalaja e Vuçakut (Albanian)
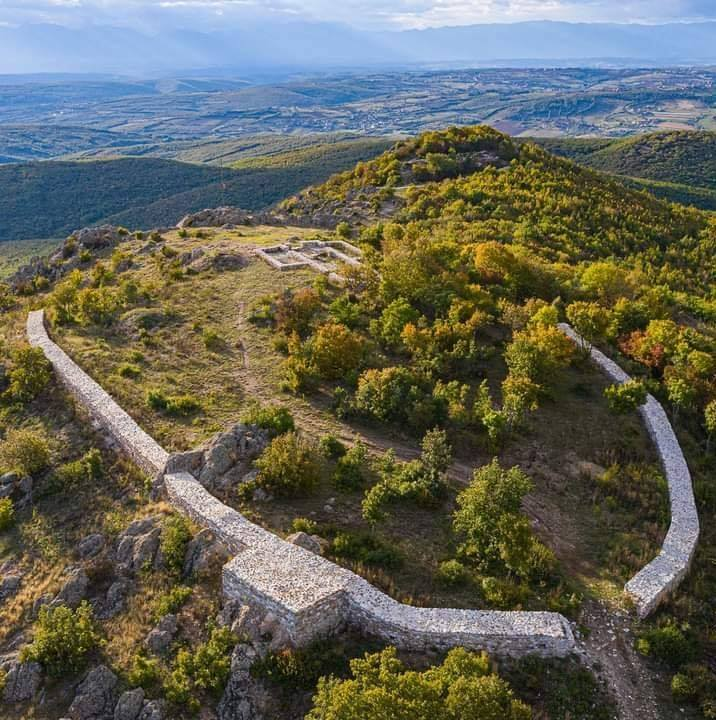
- Interactive map of Vuçak Fortress
- Location: Vuçak, Drenas, Kosovo

History
- Built: Late antiquity

Site notes
- Owner: Monuments of Kosovo

The Vuçak Fortress (Albanian: Kalaja e Vuçakut) located in Vuçak, Drenas, Kosovo, constitute an official monument of Kosovo, categorized as “archaeological” under the number 0301-803/88.

== History ==
In Vuçak at the foot of Mount Kasmaç, about 12 kilometres (7.5 mi) southwest of Drenas, the ruins along the hillsides occupy a commanding position. The collected archaeological evidences support human activity from prehistoric to the Medieval period, but the two prominent forts remaining show characteristics of the Late Antiquity period.

== See also ==
- Archaeology of Kosovo
- List of fortifications in Kosovo
