= Suvodol (Smederevo) =

- Village (Selo)
- Location within Serbia
- Coordinates: 44°33′27″N 20°52′30″E
- Country: Serbia
- District: Podunavlje District
- Municipality: Smederevo

Population (2022)
  - Total: 690
- Time zone: UTC+1 (CET)
  - Summer (DST): UTC+2 (CEST)

Suvodol is a village in the municipality of Smederevo, Serbia. According to the 2002 census, the village had a population of 849.
