= Vučak (Ivanjica) =

Vučak Вучак
- Village
- Location within Serbia
- Coordinates: 43°23′46″N 20°11′35″E
- Country: Serbia
- District: Moravica District
- Municipality: Ivanjica

Area
  - Total: 35.47 km^{2} (13.70 sq mi)

Population (2011)
  - Total: 229
  - Density: 6.46/km^{2} (16.7/sq mi)
- Time zone: UTC+1 (CET)
  - Summer (DST): UTC+2 (CEST)

Vučak is a village in the municipality of Ivanjica, Serbia. According to the 2011 census, the village has a population of 229 inhabitants.
