= House of King Petar I Karađorđević =

Coordinates: 44.790919°N 20.438839°E

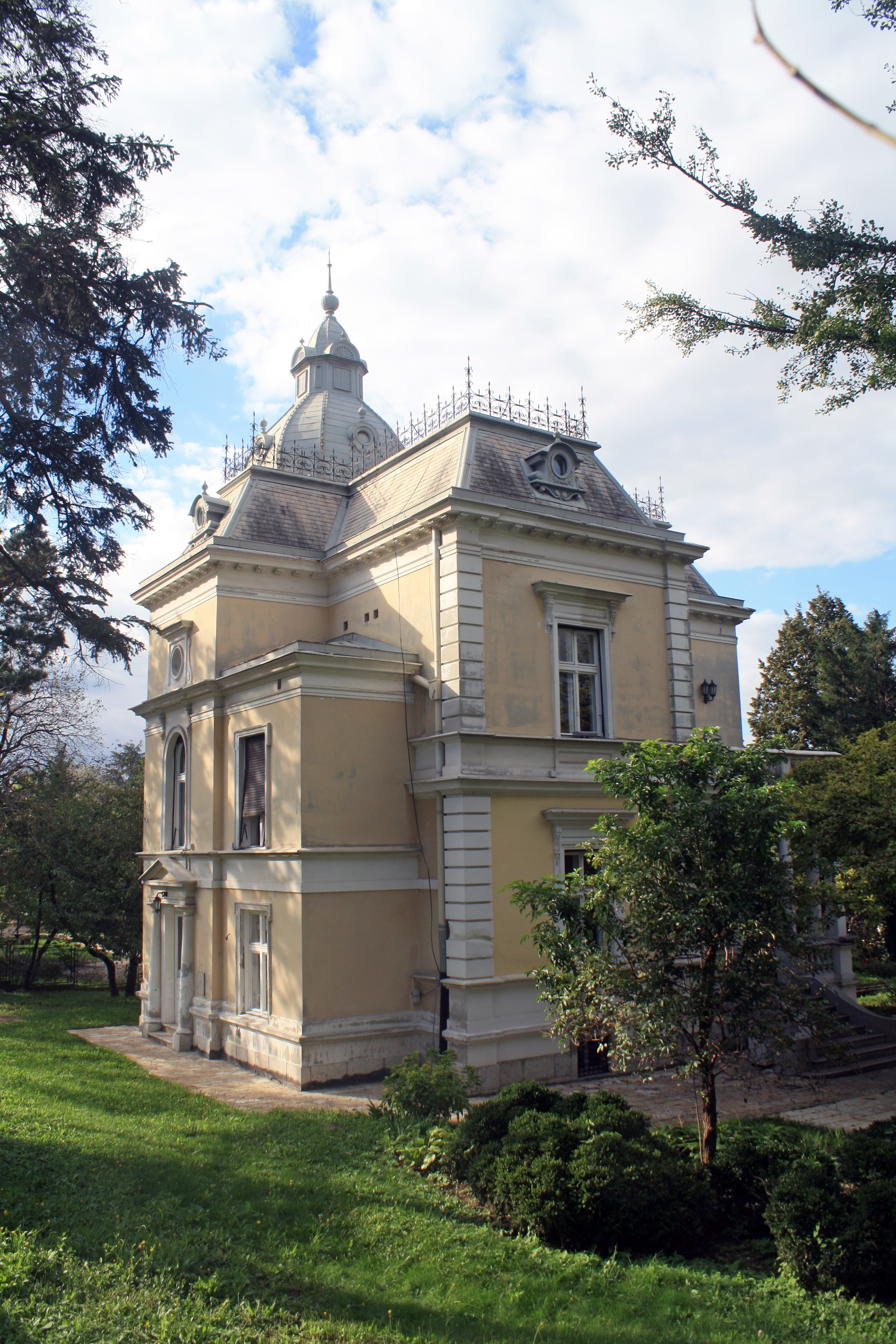
The house of King Petar I Karađorđević

The house of King Petar I Karađorđević is located in Belgrade, on the territory of the city municipality of Savski venac. When King Petar I Karađorđević after five years returned from the First World War, in 1919, the old court was destroyed in the war, so it was important to find the house in which the king was supposed to live. The merchant Đorđe Pavlović's was chosen, and in that house King Petar I spent the last two years of his life. King Petar I moved into that house on Senjak, on 24 September 1919, and lived in it until 16 August 1921. He died in this house. This house represents the immovable cultural property as a cultural monument.

== History ==
The house of King Petar I Karađorđević was built in 1896 on Topčidersko Brdo. The house was built as a vacation home by the merchant Đorđe Pavlović. Although built for the temporary residence, the reputation and the wealth of its owner were the reason why the house was much bigger and more representative than the vacation houses in the nearby area. The Pavlović family used the house as the vacation house for two decades. In 1919 the family rented the house to the Court, since they were looking to the appropriate house in which the King Petar I Karađorđević was supposed to live, since he just returned from the four-year exile after the withdrawal of his army from Serbia in 1915. At the time of moving into the mansion on Topčidersko Brdo, Petar I Karađorđević formally was not the king of Serbia, that is, of the Kingdom of Serbs, Croats and Slovenes, since he signed his abdication on 11 March 1919. King Petar lived a very modest and quiet life in the rented mansion that he paid for from his own funds. His bedroom on the upper floor contained a bed, a desk, a wardrobe, a washbasin, a lamp, the adjacent dining room had a dining table, chairs and a cupboard, and in the library there was a book cabinet. In the salons there were only the most necessary pieces of furniture. There was little decoration on the walls. The portraits and the paintings of the Royal family could be seen only on the walls of the salon where King Petar hosted occasional visitors and guests. In the dining room there was an icon of St. Аndrew the First-Called, a patron saint of the House of Karađorđević. King Petar died on 16 August 1921. The Government issued the public statement for the citizens of the Kingdom of SCS the same evening: „Our whole nation, irrespective of difference in name and religion, will remain profoundly grateful to the Great King whose reign of a rigorously constitutional and parliamentary monarch has provided for popular liberties, thereby creating the opportunity for the full development of the people’s strength to achieve the great national goals and tasks“. At the cabinet meeting held after the death of King Petar the decision was made to purchase the house in which King Peter “ailed and died” for the National Museum with the provision that "all rooms remain as they are". It took three years after King Peter's death for the Ministry of Education to set up a committee for establishing the Museum of King Peter the First. The house was purchased from the owner, a new fence with a stately gate resembling those of the Old and the New Palace was built and the garden was landscaped. However, the Committee faced the problem of not having enough exhibits to illustrate the reign and private life of King Peter, and the museum was never officially opened. After the Second World War, the house served as a school for a while, and then, since there was no adequate purpose, the tenants were moved in. It was renovated in 1997 according to a project of the Institute for the Protection of Cultural Monuments. In 2005 the right of use of the house was transferred to the Municipality of Savski Venac, which has converted it into a cultural centre under the name "The House of King Peter the First". Even though the house never became the museum it was planned to become in 1921, the name of the cultural centre preserves the memory of the King the Liberator who "strengthened democracy, the parliamentary system and liberties in Serbia".

== Architecture ==
The house of the King Petar I Karađorđević represents a two-storey vacation house of the late 19th century, with the desire to show the reputation and the wealth overcame the need for the adjustment to the nature and resembles more to the urban mansion than to the vacation house. Therefore, the house consists of two completely separated parts, one public, on the ground floor, accessed by a representative stairway and a covered terrace with columns, and the other private one, on the upper floor, accessed by a side entrance. The ground floor contained two drawing rooms and a dining room, bedrooms were on the upper floor, and the kitchen in the semi basement. The facades exhibit characteristic elements of the style of academism. The columns and pilasters are placed next to the portals and windows. Tympanums and lintels are the dominant decoration on the facade. The porch on the ground floor and the balcony on the first floor have the baluster fences. The mansard roof with dormers has the wrought-iron railing as the final element. The mansard roof is topped by a dome with a lantern. Each of the differently shaped facades has its own central emphasised motif exclusively defined by the shape and the decoration of the window. For its historical, architectural and townscape value the House of King Peter I Karadjordjević was designated as a cultural heritage property in 1992.

== Museum of King Petar I Karađorđević ==
After the death of the king, the Government of the Kingdom of SCS purchased the mansion in 1924 with the intention to place the Museum of King Petar I. For that occasion, in 1926 at the entrance to the garden, a monumental entrance gate was built, whose portal resembled the portals of the court complexes on Terazije. On the portal there was the emblem of the Kingdom of Serbia, the king's monogram and three key years from the king's life, the year of his birth, 1844, the year when he became the king, 1903 and the year of his death, 1921, with the inscription The Museum of King Petar I The museum was never opened, until 2010, when, upon the initiative of the Municipality of Savski Venac, which adapted the house and the memorial room of King Petar, the house was enlivened as the modern cultural centre.

== See more ==
- Peter I of Serbia

== Literature ==
- Belgrade in the Past and in the Present, Belgrade, 1927
- D. Živojinović: King Petar I Karađorđević, The War and the Last Years, Belgrade 2003.
- S. Ivančević, The House of King Petar I Karađorđević on Senjak, The Heritage V, Belgrade 2004
- Documentation of the Cultural Heritage Protection Institute of the City of Belgrade
