= Smederevo Gymnasium =

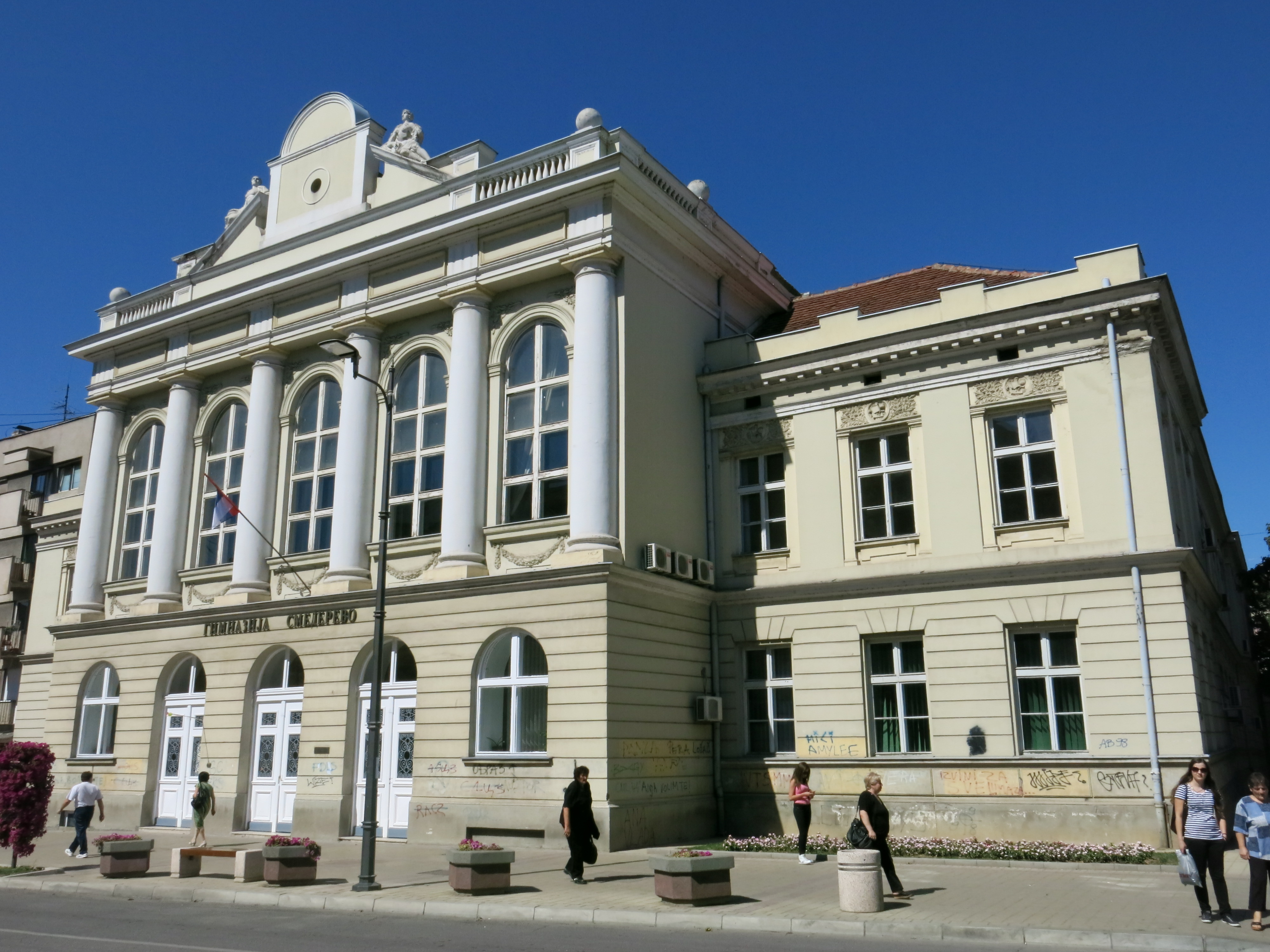
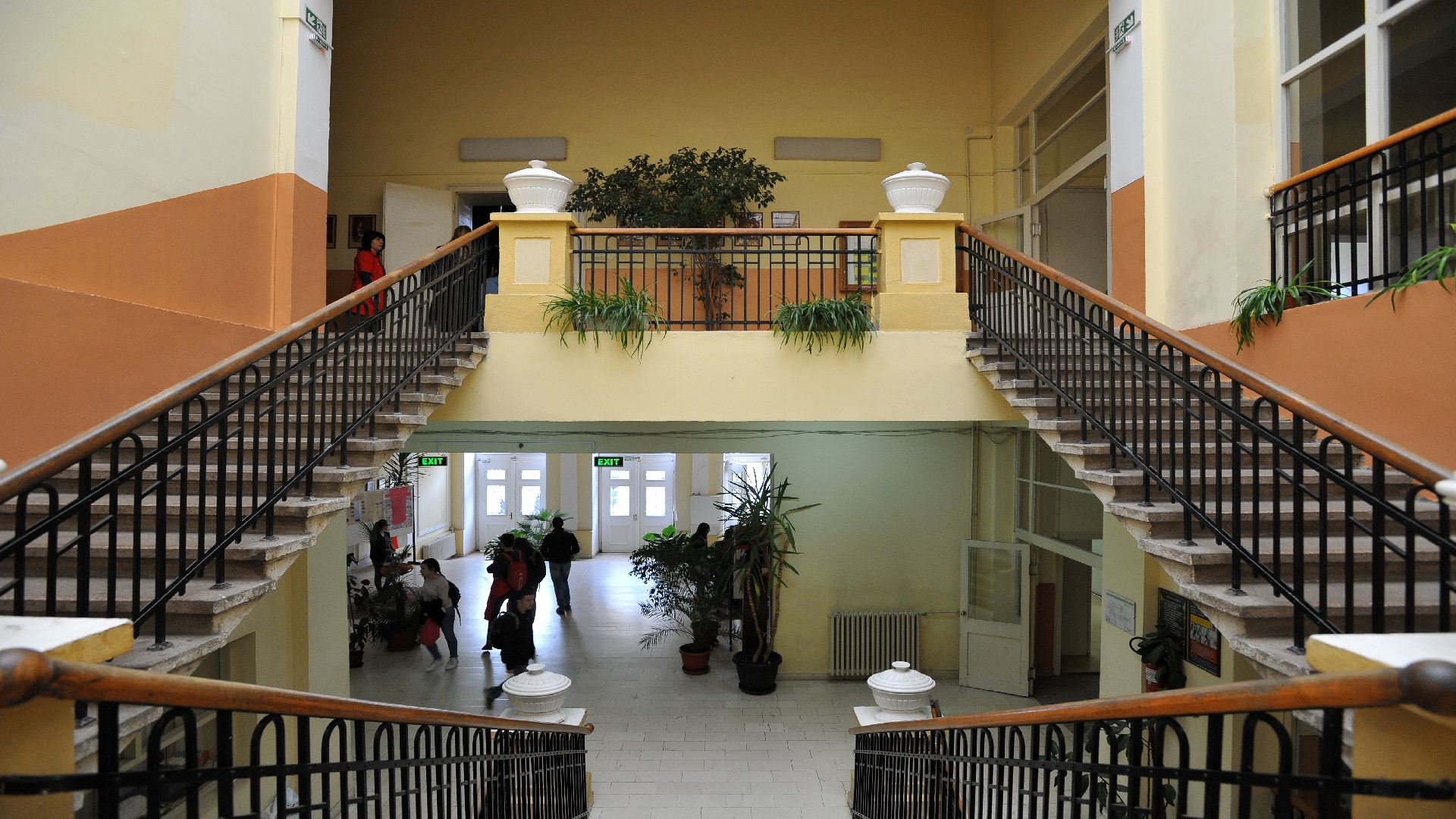
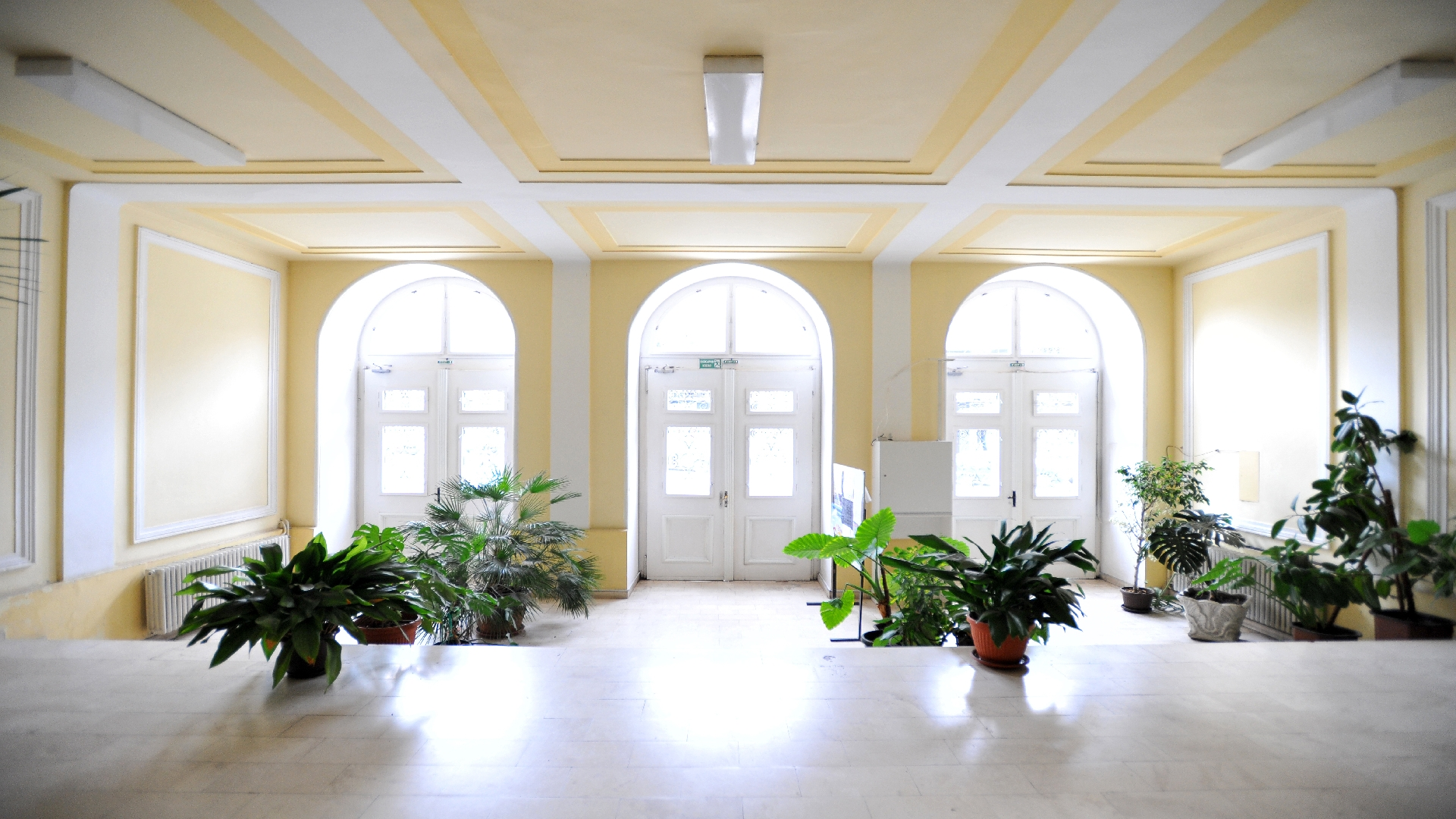

Location
- Smederevo; Serbia
- Coordinates: 44°39′52″N 20°55′42″E

Information
- Type: public school
- Established: 1871; 155 years ago
- Campus: Urban
- Website: www.gimnazijasd.edu.rs

The Smederevo Gymnasium (Serbian: Гимназија Смедерево, Gimnazija Smederevo) is a public coeducational high school (gymnasium, similar to preparatory school) located in Smederevo, city in Podunavlje District, Serbia. The Gymnasium is the sole high school institution of its kind located in the city of Smederevo. The school was opened in 1871 as a small and modest educational institution with only 35 students enrolled during the inaugural school year. Milan Maksimović undertook the responsibilities of teaching Serbian grammar and geography while also serving as the first deputy director. Branislav Nušić is one of the most prominent former students of the high school. The school is recipient of Yugoslav era Order of Merits for the People with Golden Star.

== History ==
The school was established in 1871 following the permission by the Ministry of Education of the Principality of Serbia. 1872 was the year when the second grade was introduced followed by of the third grade in 1878 and the fourth grade in 1879. In 1912, the school underwent a transformative change, becoming a six-grade mixed school, following its merger with the Private Lower Girls' Gymnasium. This consolidation resulted in a notable increase in enrolment, with 340 students becoming part of the Gymnasium.

During the First World War and the Serbian campaign, the school remained closed, but after liberation in 1918, it resumed its operations as a five-grade institution, quickly transitioning to a six-grade school. During this period, it was known as the Royal Serbian Gymnasium. Due to wartime disruptions, the school year was shortened, and some students attended additional courses and exams. Full-time education was reintroduced in 1920 when the school was renamed as the Smederevo Gymnasium.

In 1930, the Danube Banovina purchased the building of the former Elementary School and adjacent property for the gymnasium. The expansion was completed in 1935, leading to the opening of the first classrooms and the school library. During this period, the Gymnasium Collection of Antiquities was established, later transferred to the National Museum in Smederevo in 1950.

During the World War II in Yugoslavia, the building was occupied by the authorities of the German military command for Serbia, while the school operated from the premises of the Elementary School and private buildings. The building was later transformed into the military hospital while students continued to attended classes at the District Court and the local cinema hall. Regular classes resumed in April 1944, but were soon interrupted again during the Allied bombing of Smederevo.

As part of the educational system reorganization in 1951, the lower grades at the Gymnasium were gradually abolished, and by the 1954/55 school year, it had become a four-year high school. Entrance exams for enrolment were introduced in 1956.

In 2015 current and former students, together with professors, organized demonstrations against the decision of the Ministry of Education to introduce an interim administration when the city of Smederevo complained to the state that Milutin Vučković was elected as the director for the fifth time. The ministry appointed inspector claimed that the director obstructed the establishment of the new school board. Vučković was removed from his position after 25 years with appointment of unlicensed teacher-trainee Radmila Trajković as the acting director. 67 out of 73 professors expressed opposition to the move initiated by the city expressing concerns over undue political influence of the ruling Serbian Progressive Party and family links between the new acting director and the city mayor.
