= Molin Forest =

Forest in Vojvodina, Serbia

Coordinates: 45.647528°N 20.528126°E

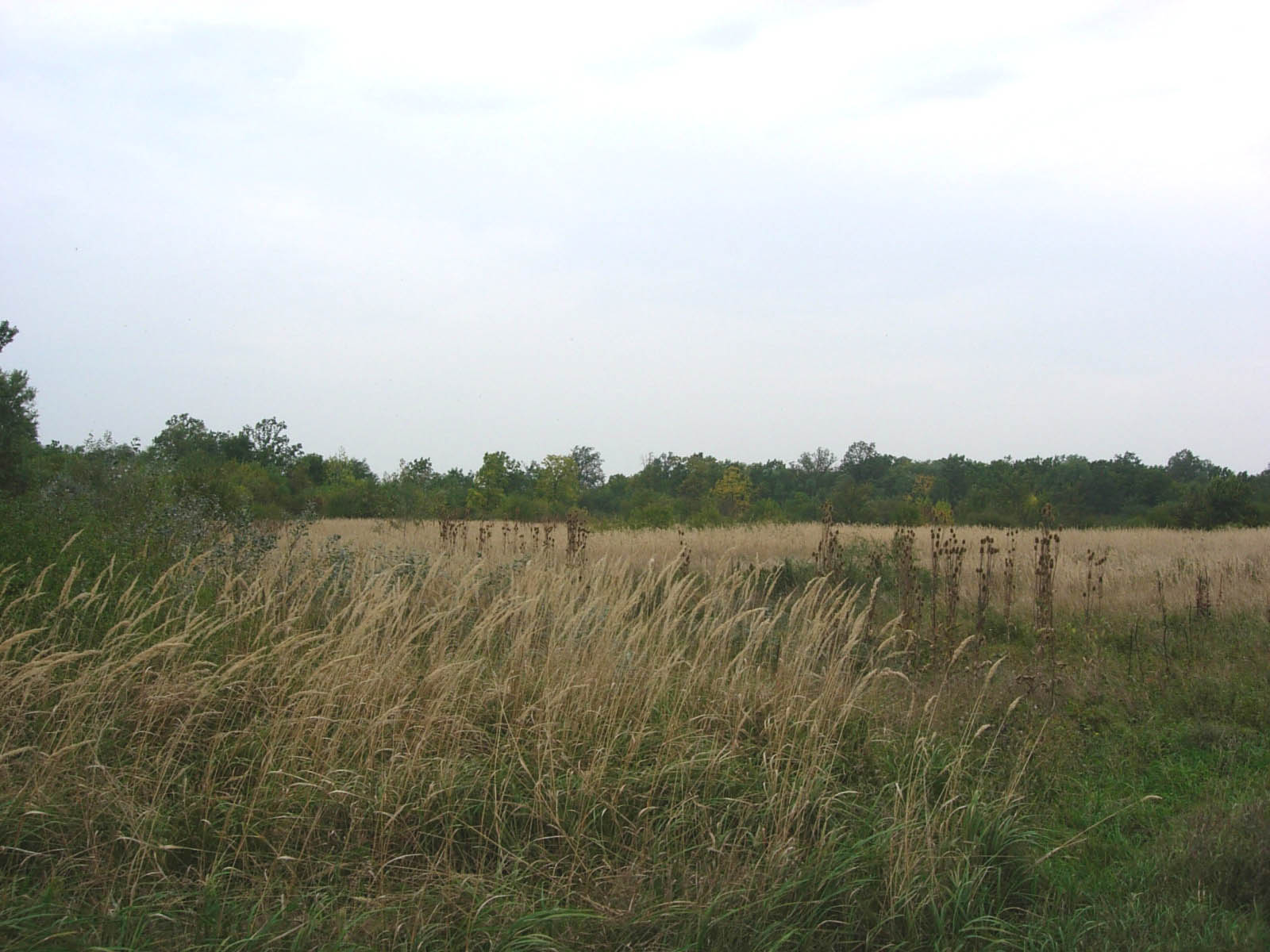
The Molin Forest

Molin Forest (Serbian: Молинска шума; Molinska šuma) is a poplar forest located in Nova Crnja municipality in Vojvodina province, Serbia. It was planted on the site of a settlement named Molin, which was abandoned in 1957 due to groundwater and recurring flooding. The Molin Forest is used as a hunting ground.
