= Subotica Gymnasium =

Svetozar Marković Gymnasium

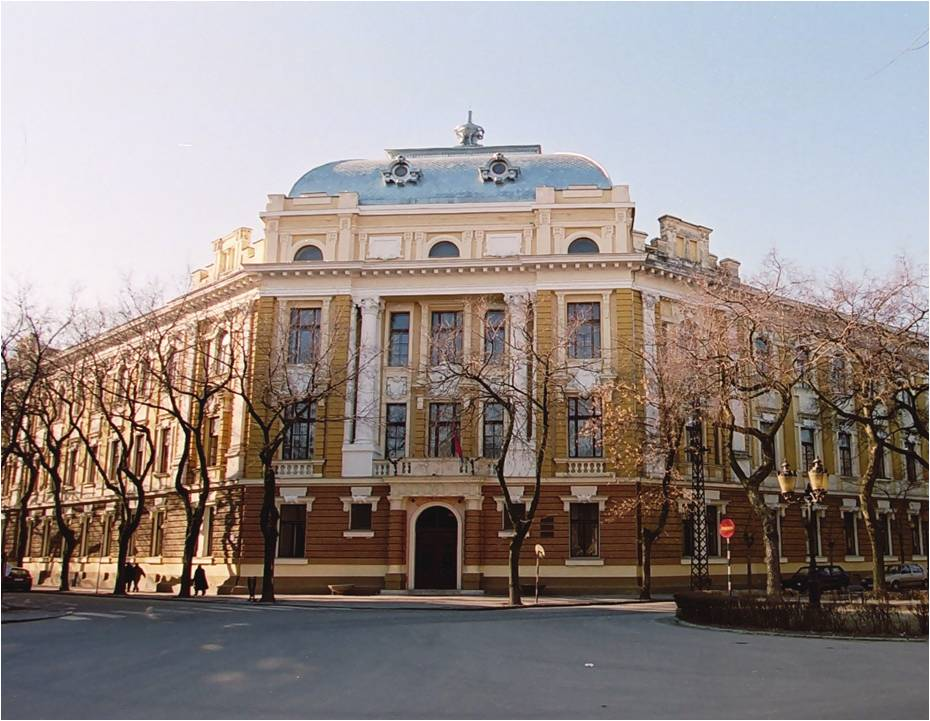
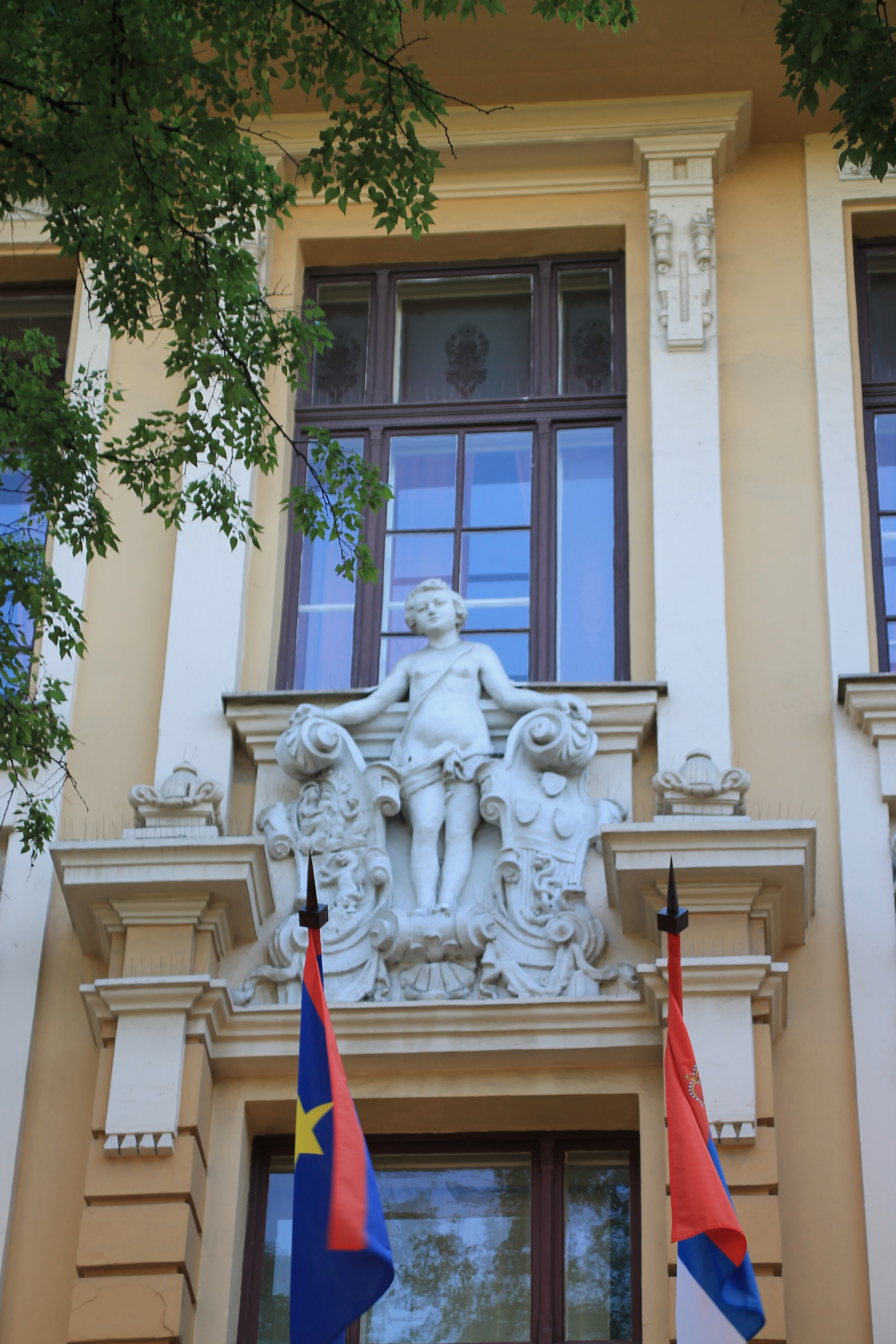
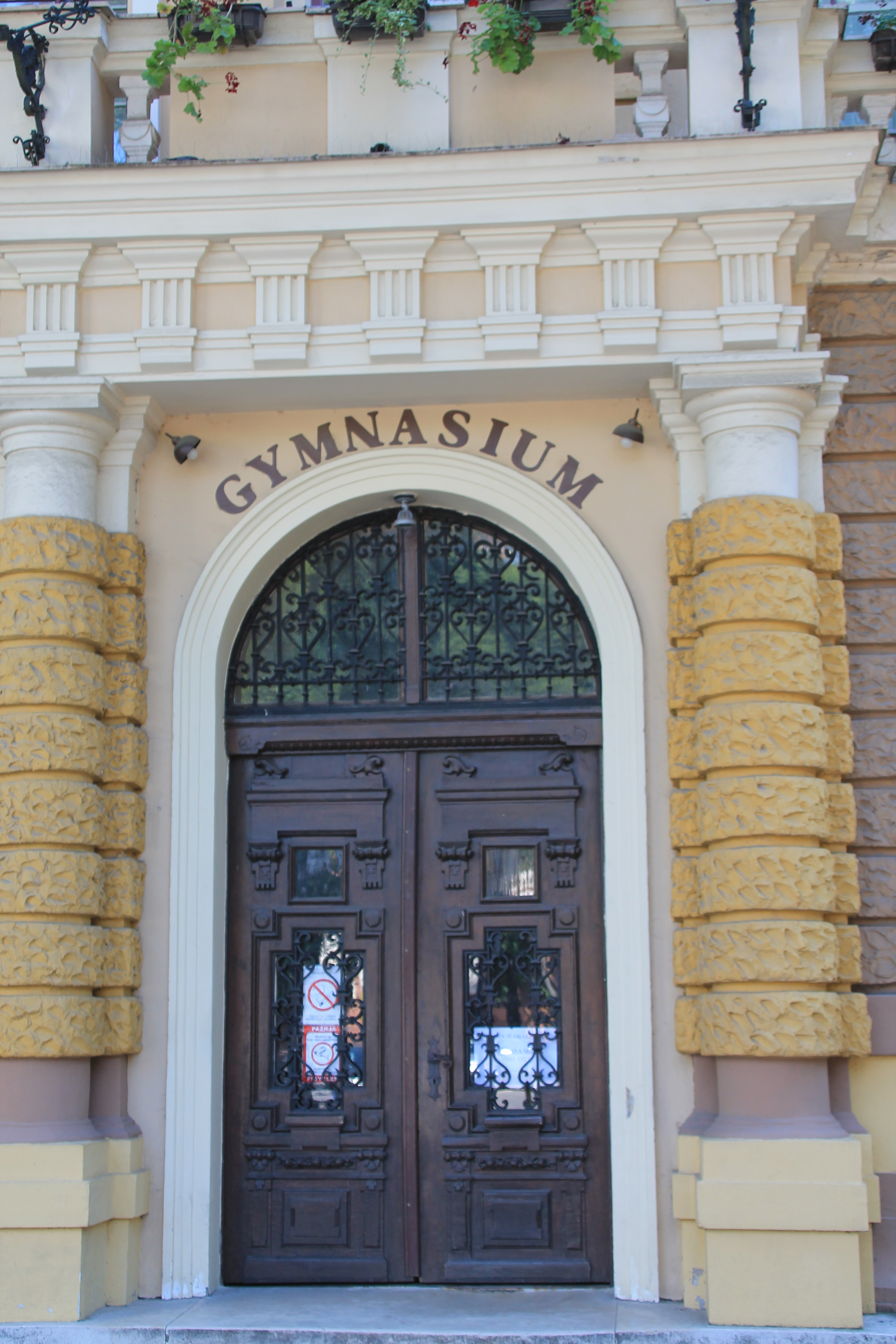
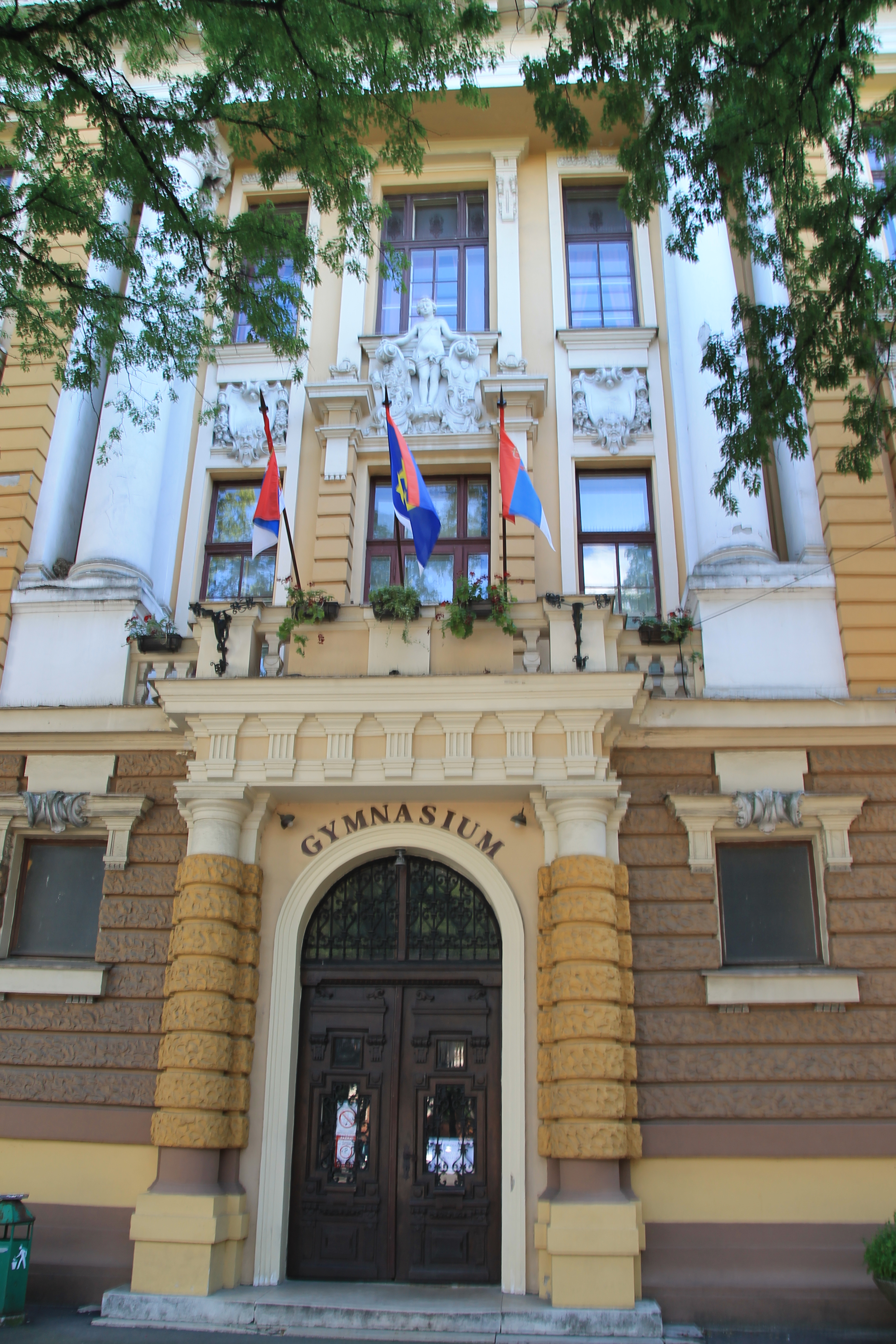

Location
- Subotica, Vojvodina; Serbia
- Coordinates: 46°06′01″N 19°39′38″E

Information
- Type: public school
- Established: 1796; 230 years ago
- Campus: Urban
- Website: gimnazijasubotica.edu.rs

The Svetozar Marković Gymnasium (Serbian: Гимназија „Светозар Марковић” Суботица, Gimnazija „Svetozar Marković” Subotica, Hungarian: Svetozar Marković Gimnázium, Szabadka), colloquially known as the Subotica Gymnasium, is a public coeducational high school (gymnasium, similar to preparatory school) located in Subotica, city in Vojvodina, Serbia. The school was established in 1796, in the Kingdom of Hungary. By a 1845 law, Latin as a teaching language was abolished with the introduction of Hungarian in its place. The school system in Austrian Empire was reformed in 1849 with Subotica Gymnasium organizing only four lower grades from 1852, and introducing full high school curriculum in 1862/1863 school year. Professors in the Grammar School and later in the Gymnasium were Franciscans until 1860, after which, apart from religious teachers, secular individuals with university education took over the role of educators. The institution is housed in a purpose-built building from 1896.

During World War I from 1914, the Gymnasium building housed a military hospital of the Austro-Hungarian army. After the war ended, in May 1919, the City Bunjevac Gymnasium was opened. This marked the first time that instruction was carried out in Serbo-Croatian, even though the curriculum was still based on Hungarian. The Gymnasium was renamed the State Mixed High School in 1920 and soon divided into male and female branches. In 1990 the school was named after Svetozar Marković, Serbian political activist, literary critic and socialist philosopher. Before that, the school was for a longer period of time named after Moša Pijade.
