= Vučak (Smederevo) =

Vučak Вучак
- Village (Selo)
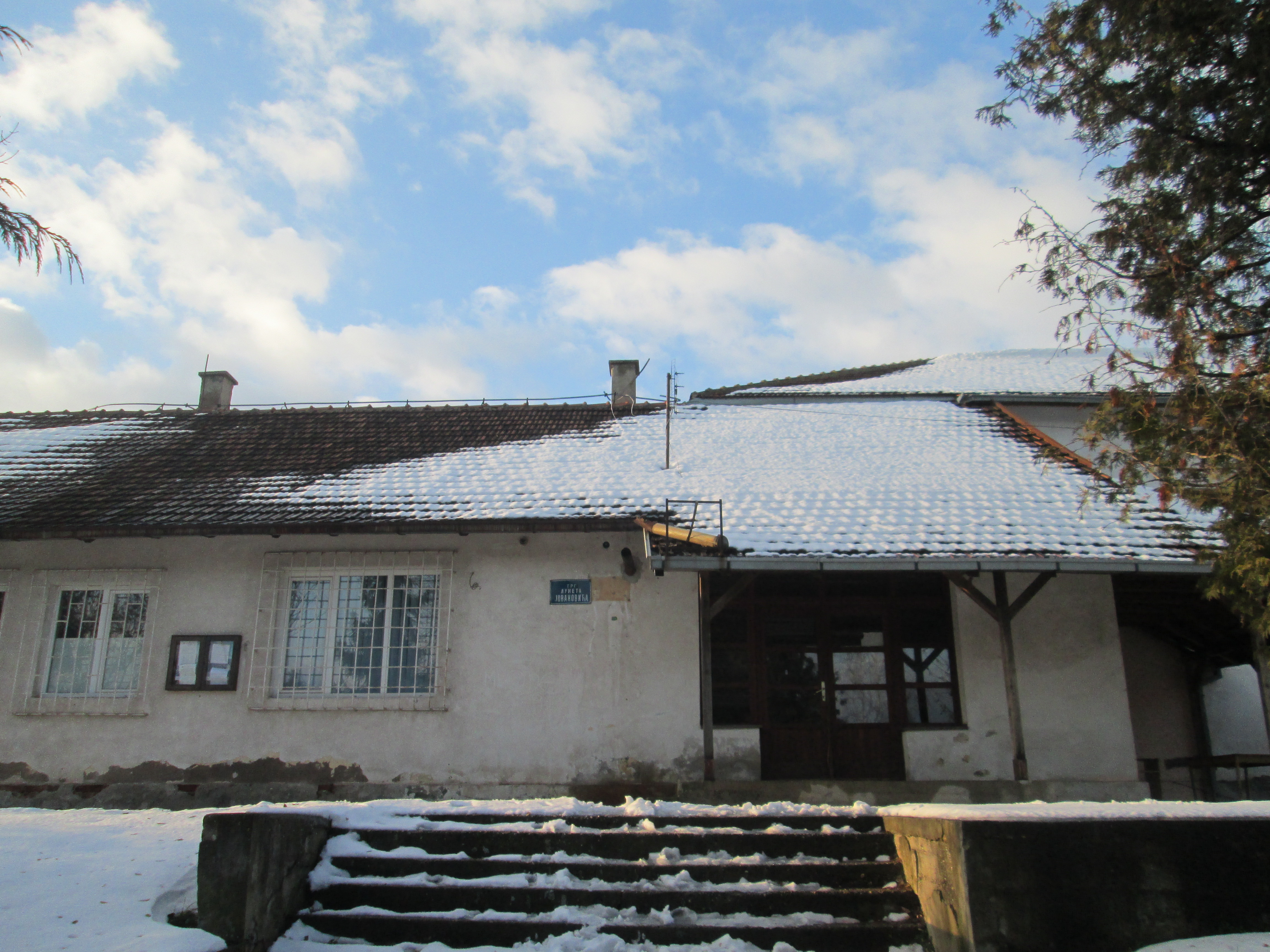

- Location within Serbia
- Coordinates: 44°37′22″N 20°55′30″E
- Country: Serbia
- District: Podunavlje
- Municipality: Smederevo

Population (2022)
  - Total: 1,751
- Time zone: UTC+1 (CET)
  - Summer (DST): UTC+2 (CEST)

Vučak is a village in the municipality of Smederevo, Serbia. According to the 2022 census, the village has a population of 1,751 people.
