= Vuçak =

Village in Drenas, Kosovo

Vuçak Trstenik Vučak
- Village
- Location in Kosovo
- Coordinates: 42.595°N 20.818°E
- Country: Kosovo
- District: Pristina
- Municipality: Drenas

Population (2024)
  - Total: 238
- Time zone: UTC+1 (CET)
  - Summer (DST): UTC+2 (CEST)

Vuçak (Albanian definite form: Vuçaku), or Vučak (Serbian Cyrillic: Вучак), is a village in the municipality of Drenas, Kosovo. The village has 52 houses and is home to 238 inhabitants.

== Geography ==
Vuçak is located in central Kosovo. The village is around 15 km (9.3 mi) away from Drenas.

== History ==
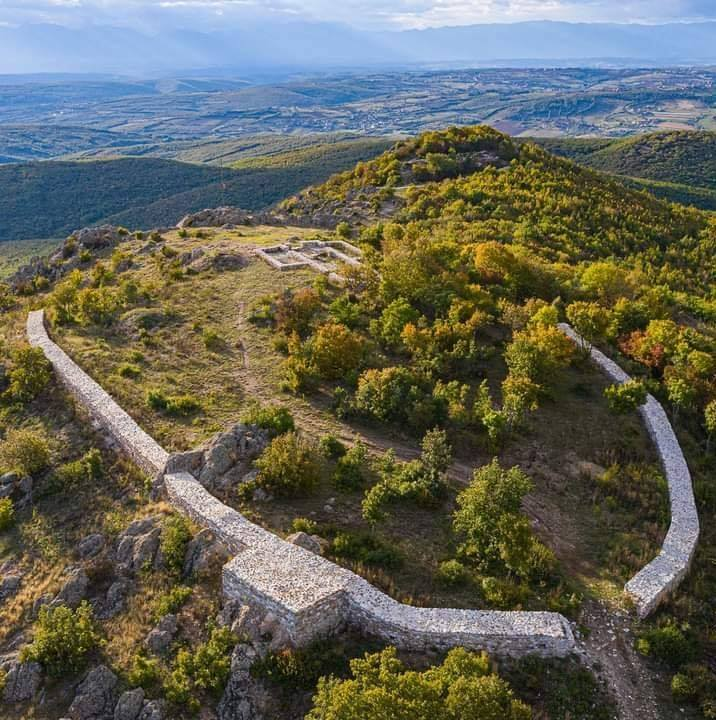
Vuçak Fortress

In Vuçak, on top of a hill is located the Vuçak Fortress. The collected archaeological evidences in the fortress support human activity from prehistoric to the Medieval period, but the two prominent forts remaining show characteristics of the Late Antiquity period.
