= Šalinac =

- Village (Selo)
- Location within Serbia
- Coordinates: 44°41′06″N 21°00′43″E
- Country: Serbia
- District: Podunavlje
- Municipality: Smederevo

Area
  - Total: 10.58 km^{2} (4.08 sq mi)
- Elevation: 68 m (223 ft)

Population (2022)
  - Total: 501
  - Density: 47.4/km^{2} (123/sq mi)
- Time zone: UTC+1 (CET)
  - Summer (DST): UTC+2 (CEST)
- Area code: +381 26
- Car plates: SD

Šalinac is a village in the municipality of Smederevo, Serbia. According to the 2002 census, the village has a population of 985 people.
