= Smederevo =

Smederevo Смедерево (Serbian)
- City
- City of Smederevo
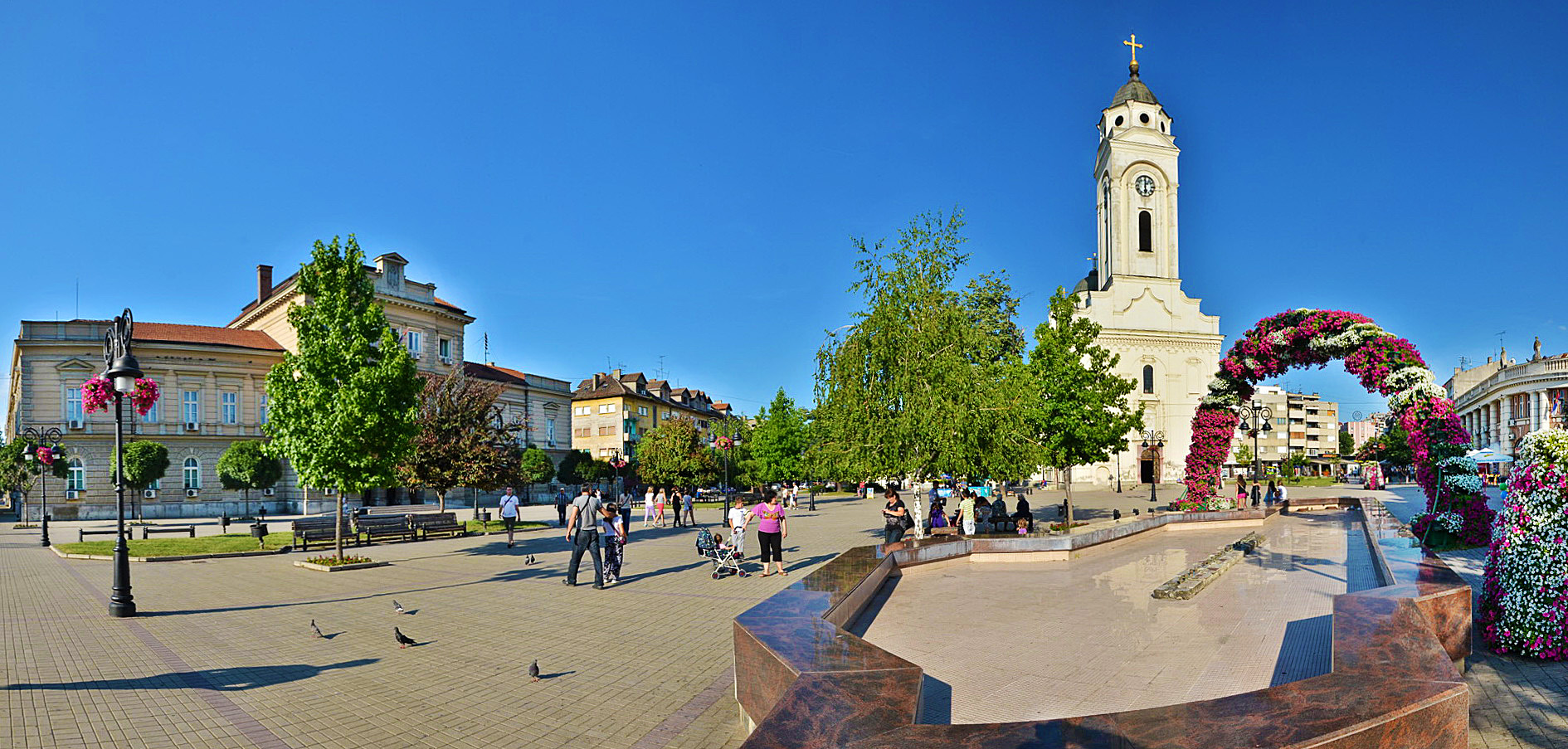
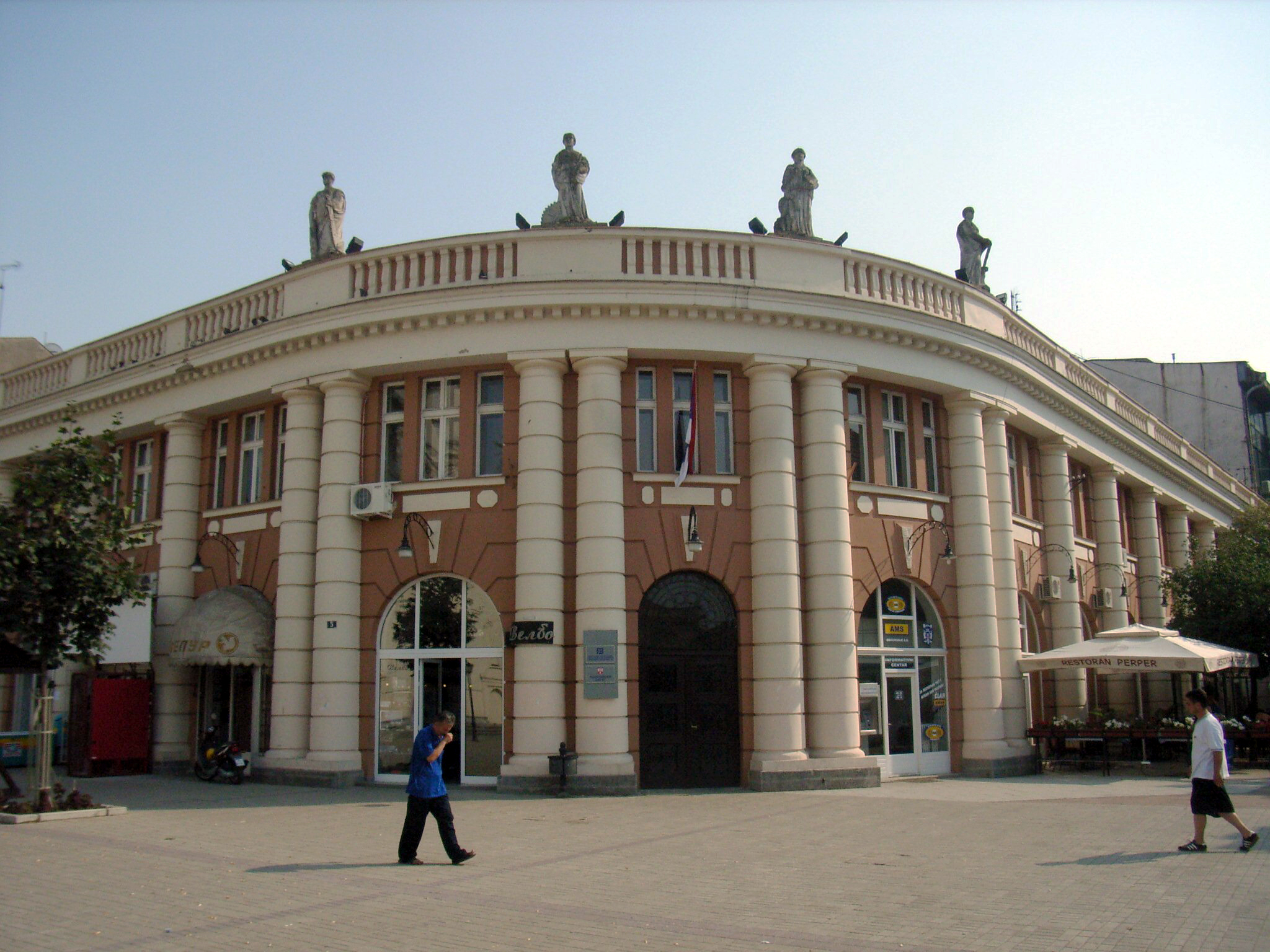
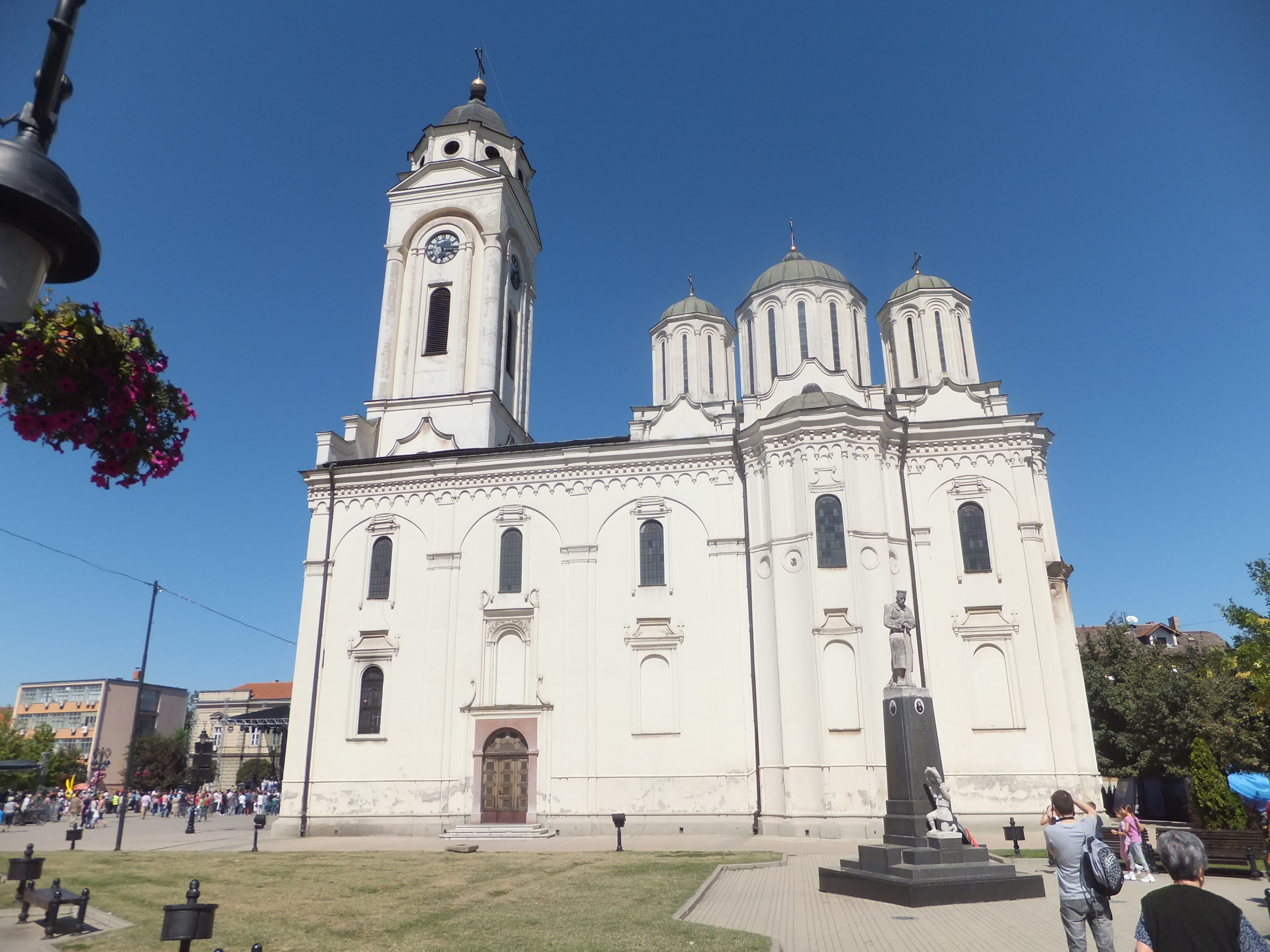
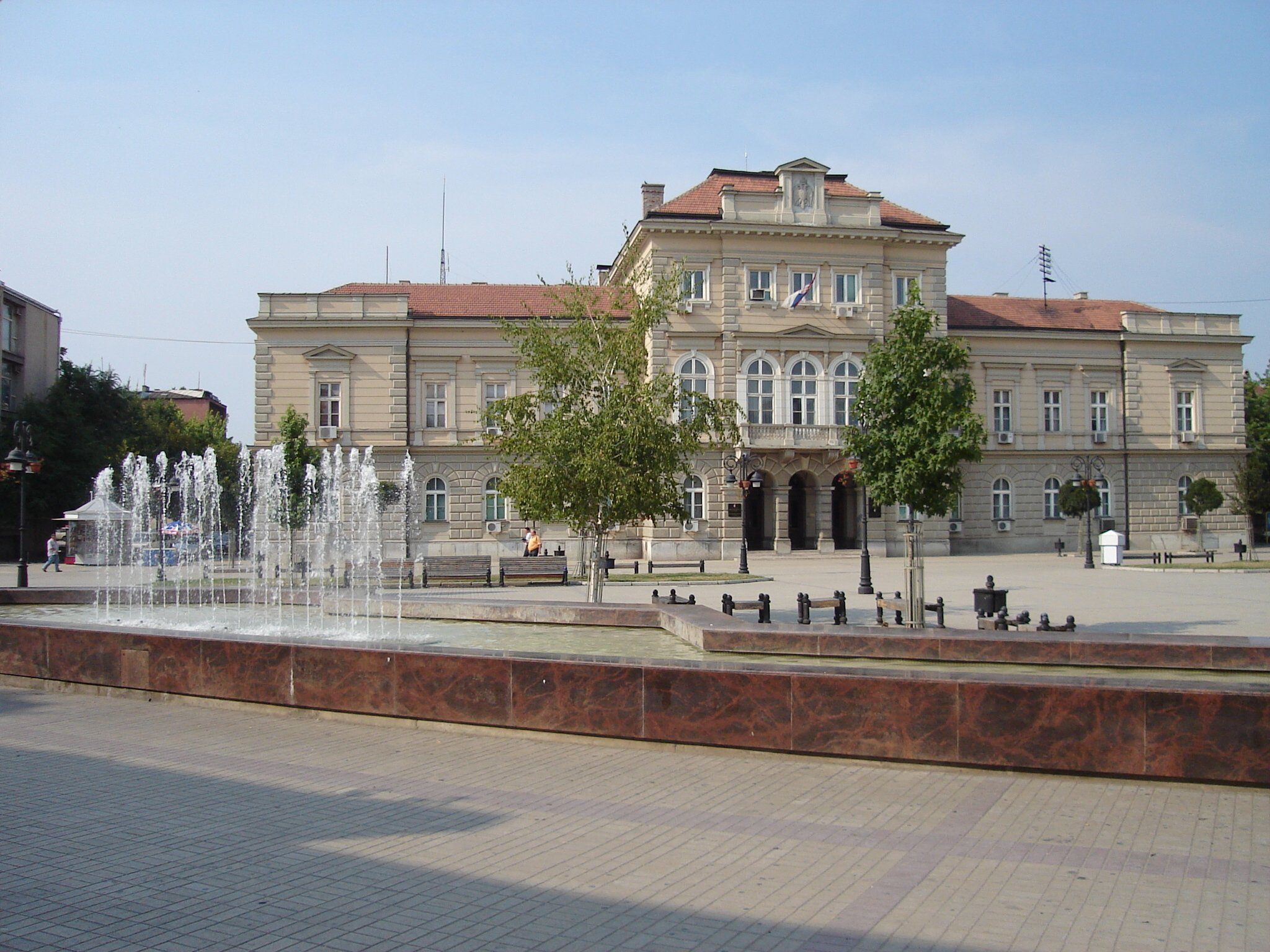
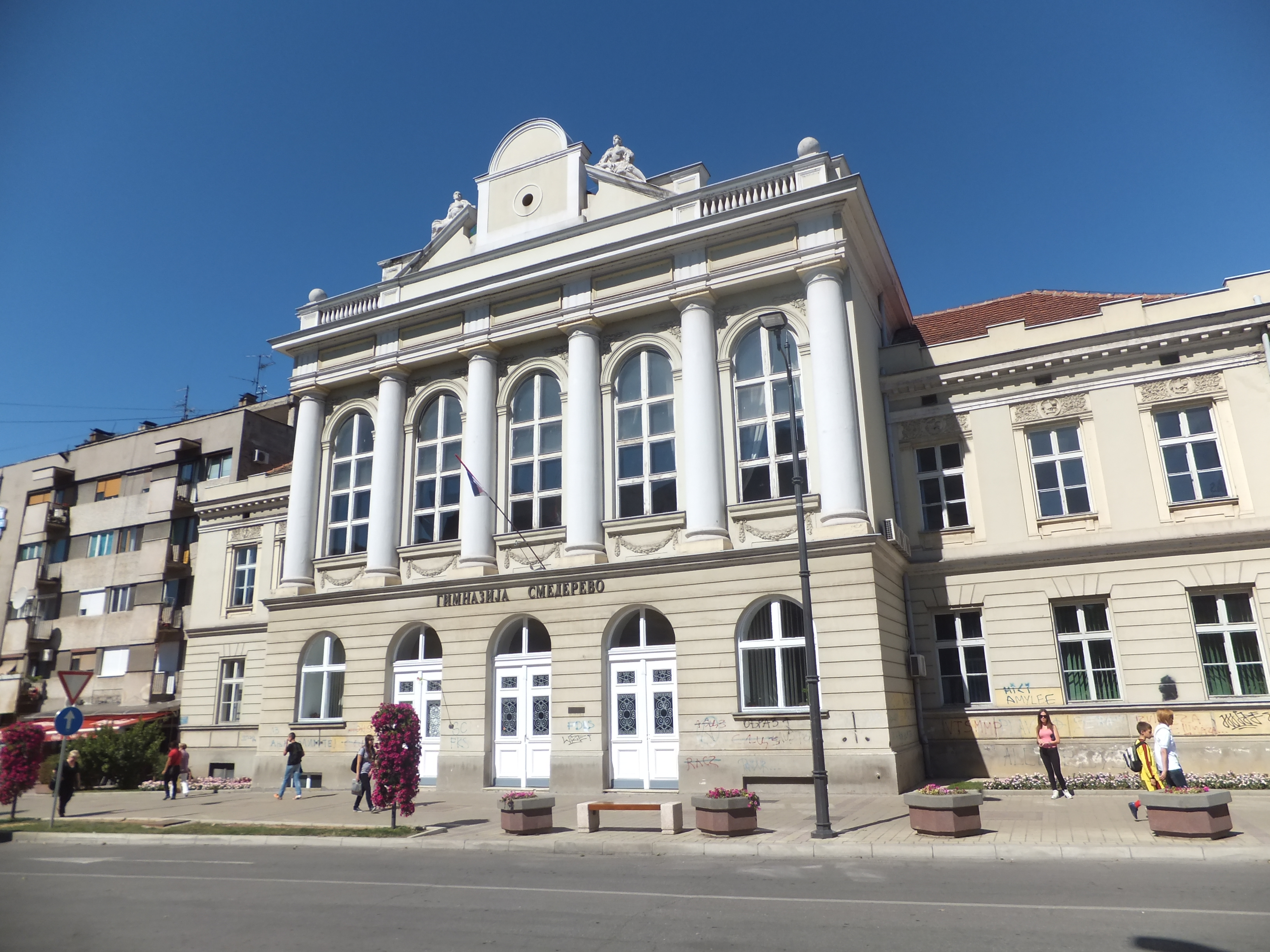
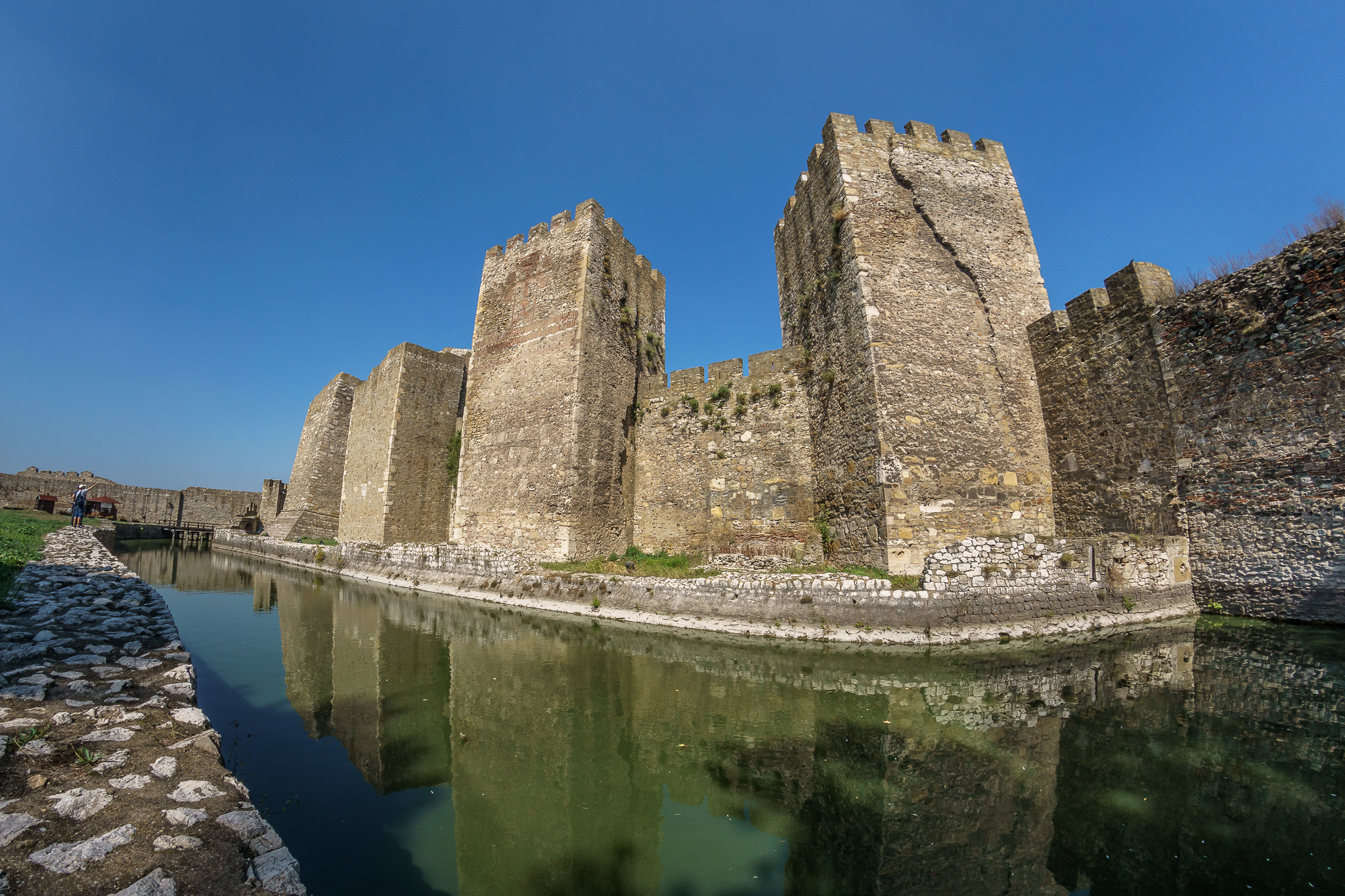
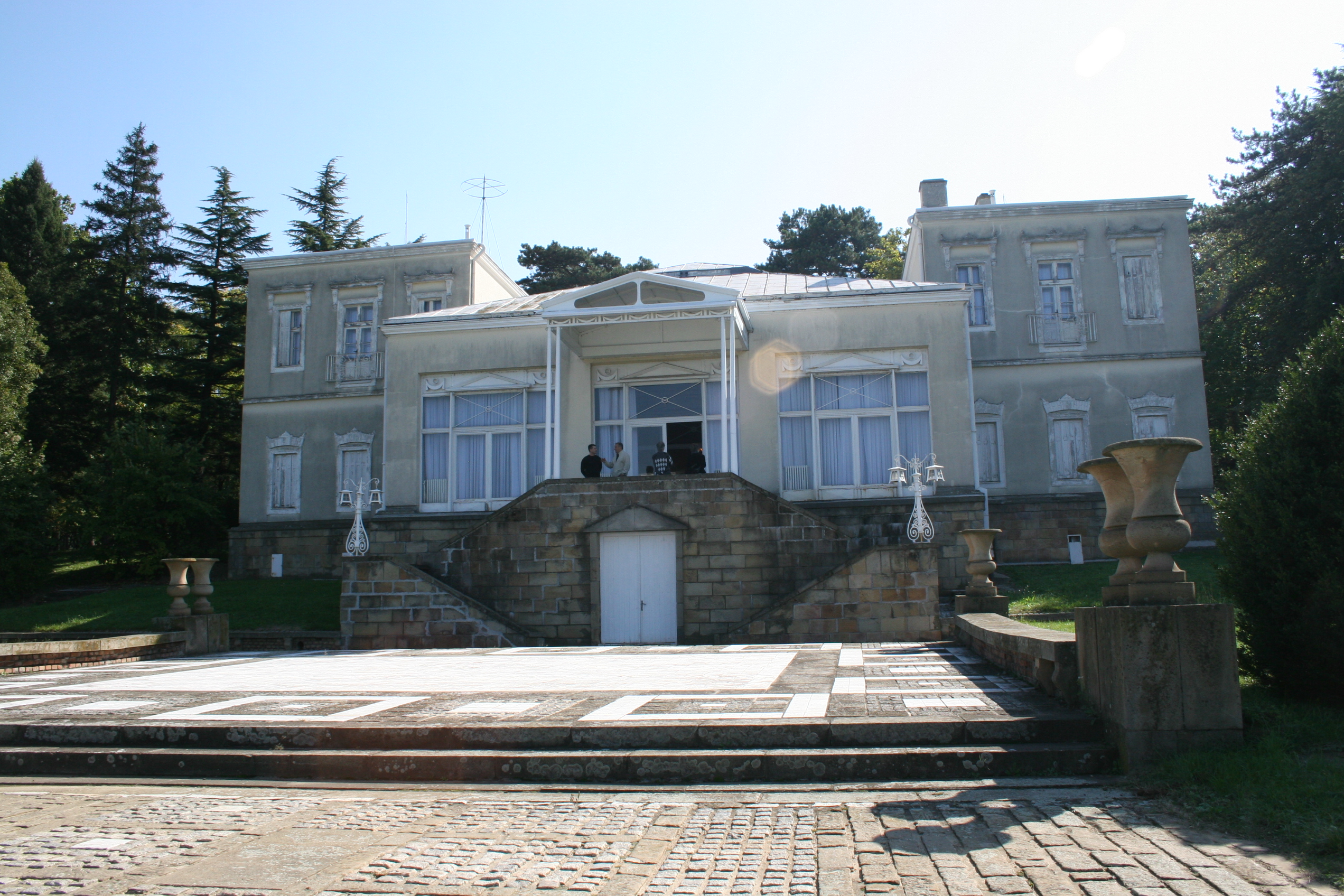
- Republic Square in Smederevo Smederevo City Hall Church of Saint George Smederevo Courthouse Smederevo Gymnasium Smederevo Fortress Villa Zlatni Breg

- Flag Coat of arms

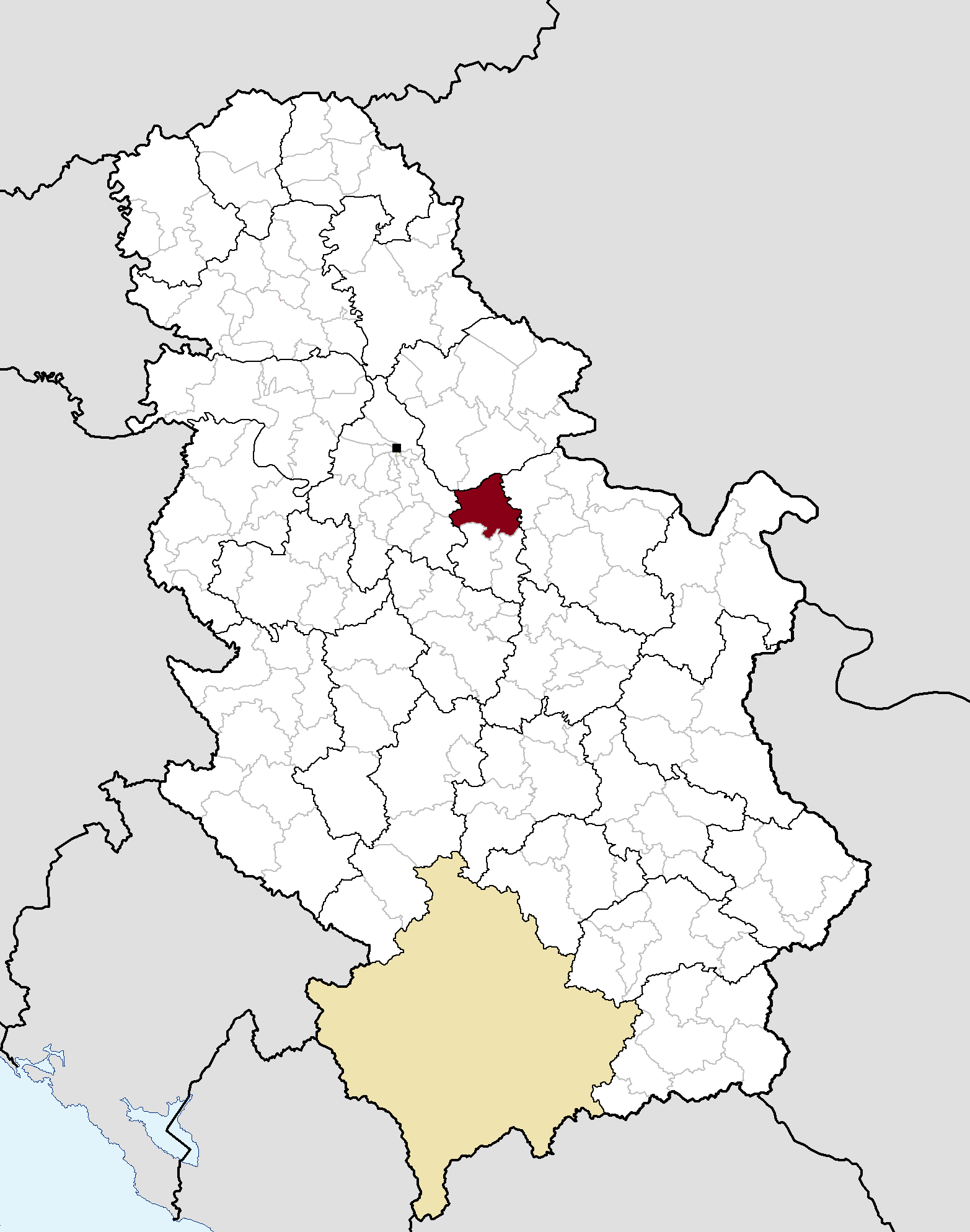
- Location of the city of Smederevo within Serbia
- Coordinates: 44°40′N 20°56′E
- Country: Serbia
- District: Podunavlje
- Founder: Despot Đurađ Branković
- Settlements: 28

Government
  - Type: SNS–SPS–BPS
  - Body: City Assembly of Smederevo
  - Mayor: Jasmina Vojinović (SNS)

Area
  - Urban: 42.03 km^{2} (16.23 sq mi)
  - Administrative: 484.30 km^{2} (186.99 sq mi)
- Elevation: 72 m (236 ft)

Population (2022 census)
  - Rank: 14th in Serbia
  - Urban: 59,261
  - Urban density: 1,410/km^{2} (3,652/sq mi)
  - Administrative: 97,930
  - Administrative density: 202.2/km^{2} (523.7/sq mi)
- Demonym(s): Serbian Smederevac (m.), Smederevka (f.)
- Time zone: UTC+1 (CET)
  - Summer (DST): UTC+2 (CEST)
- Postal code: 11300; 11303; 11304; 11305; 11330
- Area code: +381(0)26
- Vehicle registration: SD
- Official languages: Serbian
- Website: www.smederevo.ls.gov.rs

Smederevo (Serbian Cyrillic: Смедерево, pronounced [smêdereʋo]) is a city and the administrative center of the Podunavlje District in eastern Serbia. It is situated on the right bank of the Danube, about 45 kilometres (28 miles) downstream of the Serbian capital, Belgrade.

According to the 2022 census, the city has a population of 59,261, with 97,930 people living in its administrative area.

Its history starts in the 1st century BC, after the conquest of the Roman Empire, when there existed a settlement by the name of Vinceia. The modern city traces its roots back to the Late Middle Ages when it was the capital (1430–39, and 1444–59) of the last independent Serbian state before Ottoman conquest.

== Names ==
In Serbian, the city is known as Smederevo (Смедерево), in Latin, Italian, Romanian and Greek as Semendria, in Hungarian as Szendrő or Vég-Szendrő, and in Turkish as Semendire.

The name of Smederevo was first recorded in the Charter of the Byzantine Emperor Basil II from 1019, in the part related to the Eparchy of Braničevo (a suffragan diocese of the Archdiocese of Ochrid). Another written record is found in the Charter of Duke Lazar of Serbia from 1381, by which he bestowed the Monastery of Ravanica and villages and properties 'to the Great Bogosav with the commune and heritage'’.

The Latin-Italian name also occurs in Belogradum et Semendria and Belgrado e Semendria, two of the short-lived 20th-century synonyms of the Latin titular bishopric of Belgrade, which was suppressed in 1948 in favor of the residential Latin Archdiocese of Belgrade (Beograd) and 'newly' established titular bishopric of Alba Marittima.

Linguist Petar Skok suggests that the name derives from that of Saint Demetrius. Alternatively, it has been suggested that the name comes from the medieval Serbian personal name Smender, or from the words smet 'deep snow' and Old Serbian drevo 'wood'.

== Coat of arms ==
Smederevo Coat of Arms uses two shades of blue, which deviates from the heraldic principles (only one shade of every color, contrasting those). Also, the bar with the year 1430 is placed over the shield. Emblem elements are six white discs arranged 3 + 2 + 1, which represents grapes, Smederevo Fortress, dark blue and white horizontal lines (representing the Danube).

== History ==
=== Early ===
During the 7th millennium BC, the Starčevo culture thrived for millennia, followed by the 6th millennium BC Vinča culture which also flourished in the region. The Paleo-Balkan tribes of Dacians and Thracians emerged in the area during the 2nd millennium BC, with the Celtic Scordisci raiding the Balkans in the 3rd century BC.

In the 1st century BC, the Roman Empire conquered Vinceia. Subsequently, it was incorporated into Moesia, later becoming part of Moesia Superior. During the administrative reforms of Diocletian (244–311), it was included in the Diocese of Moesia, and later in the Diocese of Dacia. Vinceia held significance as a principal town of Moesia Superior, situated near the confluence of the Margus and Brongus rivers.

=== Middle Ages ===
The modern founder of the city was the Serbian despot Đurađ Branković in the 15th century, who built Smederevo Fortress in 1430 as the new Serbian capital. According to the Greek historian Theodore Spandounes, the fortress was constructed by George Kantakouzenos, Branković's brother-in-law through his consort the Byzantine princess Irene. Smederevo was the residence of the Branković house and the capital of the Serbian Despotate from 1430 until 1439, when it was conquered by the Ottoman Empire after a siege lasting two months.

=== Sanjak of Smederevo ===
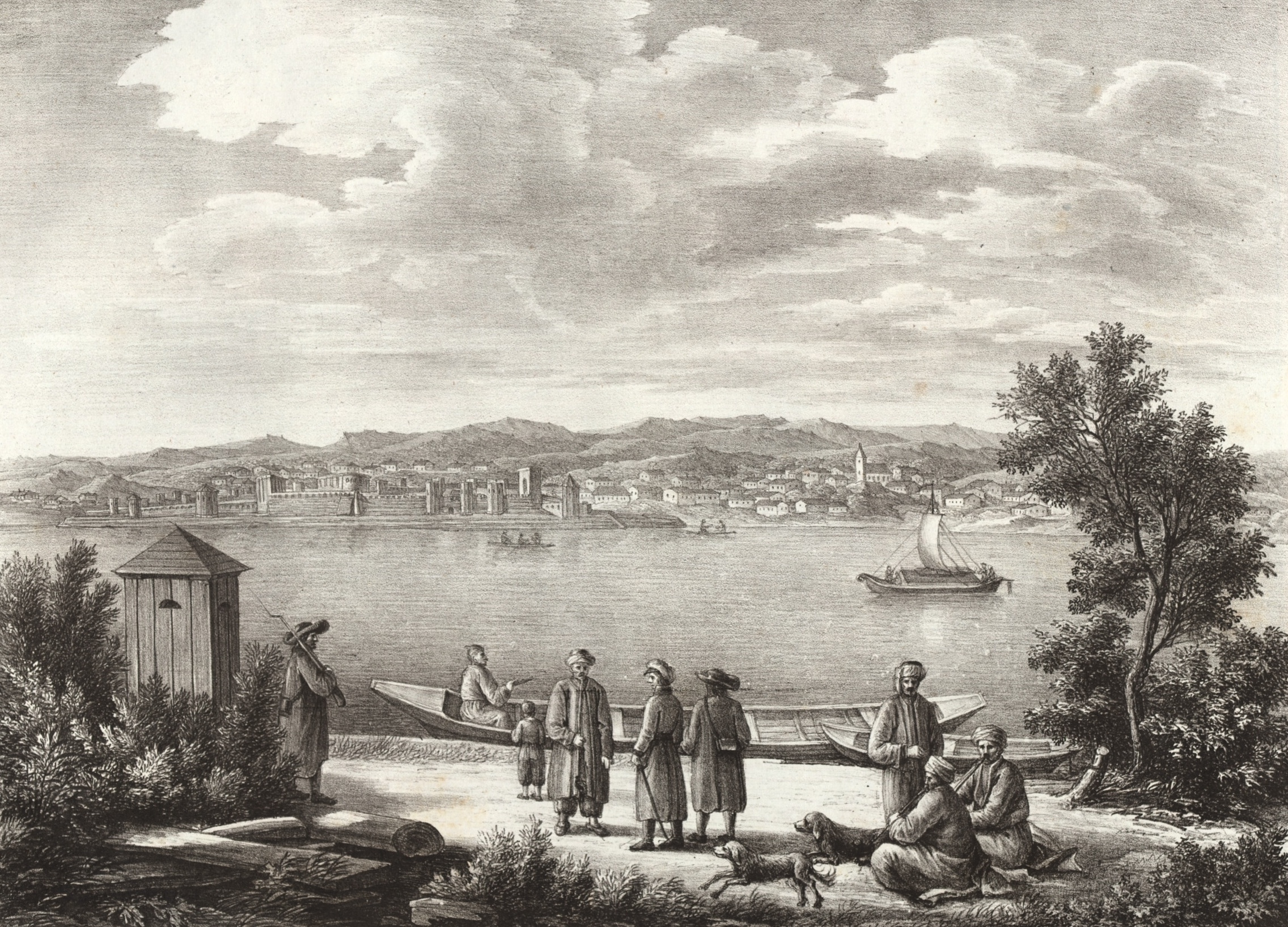
1826 lithograph of Smederevo city and fortress by Adolph Friedrich Kunike

In 1444, in accordance with the terms of the Peace of Szeged between the Kingdom of Hungary and the Ottoman Empire, the Sultan returned Smederevo to Đurađ Branković, who was allied to the Hungarian commander John Hunyadi. On 22 August 1444 the Serb prince peacefully took possession of the evacuated town. When Hunyadi broke the peace treaty, Đurađ Branković remained neutral. Serbia became a battleground between the Kingdom of Hungary and the Ottomans, and the angry Branković captured Hunyadi after his defeat at the Second Battle of Kosovo in 1448. Hunyadi was imprisoned in Smederevo Fortress for a short time.

In 1454 Sultan Mehmed II besieged Smederevo and devastated Serbia. The town was liberated by Hunyadi. In 1459 Smederevo was again captured by the Ottomans after the death of Branković. The town became a Turkish border-fortress and played an important part in Ottoman–Hungarian Wars until 1526. Due to its strategic location, Smederevo was gradually rebuilt and enlarged. For a long period, the town was the capital of the Sanjak of Smederevo.

In autumn 1476, a joint army of Hungarians and Serbs tried to capture the fortress from the Ottomans. They built three wooden counter-fortresses, but after months of siege, Sultan Mehmed II himself came to drive them away. After fierce fighting the Hungarians agreed to withdraw. In 1494 Pál Kinizsi tried to capture Smederevo from the Ottomans. In 1512 the Hungarian commander (later pretender to the throne) John Zápolya unsuccessfully laid siege to the town.

=== Modern ===
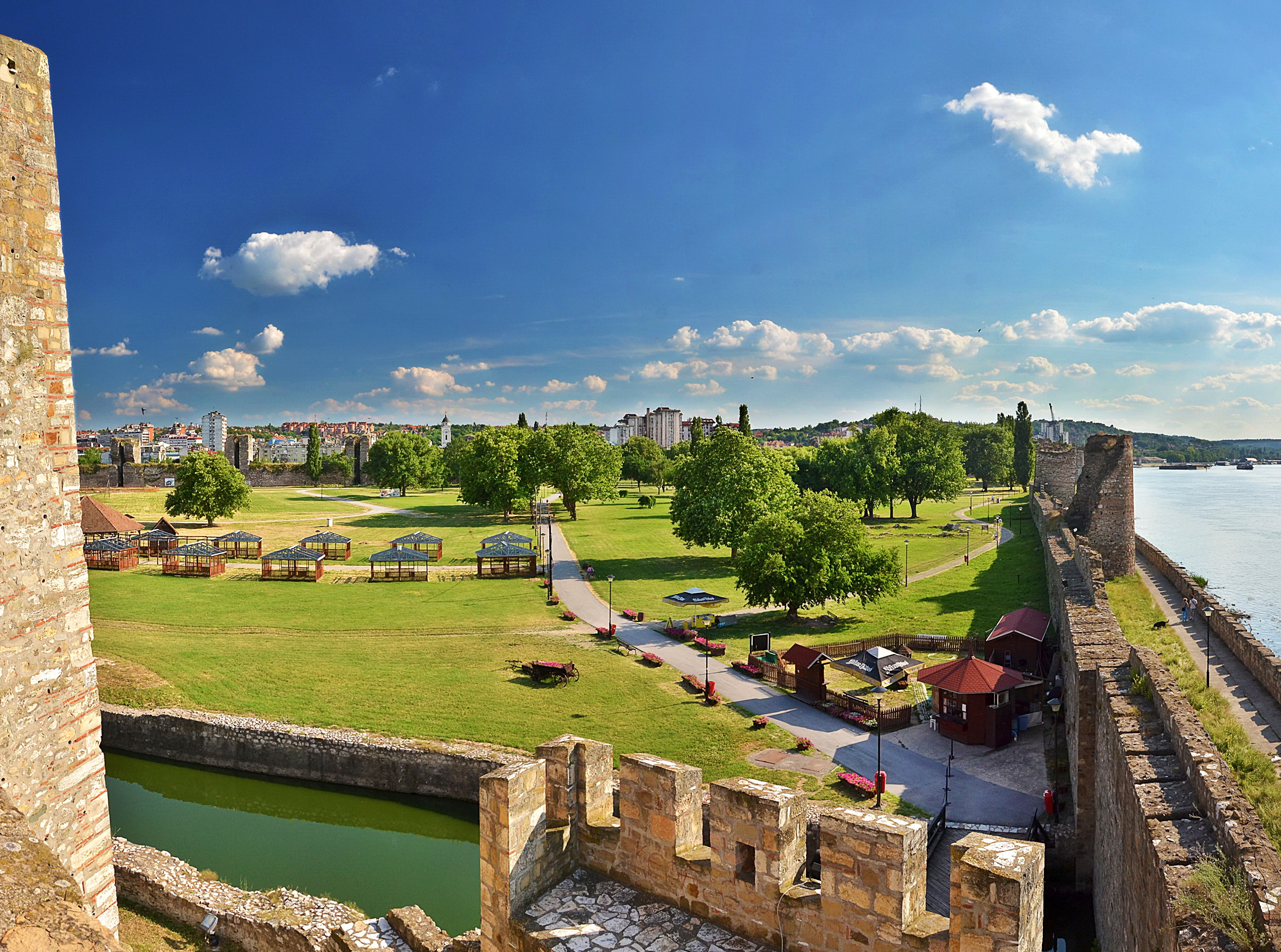
Inside Smederevo Fortress

During the First Serbian Uprising in 1806, the city became the temporary capital of Serbia, as well as the seat of the Praviteljstvujušči sovjet ("governing council"), a government headed by Dositej Obradović. The first basic school was founded in 1806. During World War II, the city was occupied by German forces, who stored ammunition in the fortress. On 5 June 1941, a catastrophic explosion severely damaged the fortress, killing nearly 2,000 residents.

After World War II, Smederevo became an industrial and cultural center of Podunavlje District. Under the overall industrial development of the Socialist Federal Republic of Yugoslavia, the city received a boost in infrastructure. Due to the ideal geographical position of Smederevo, the socialist government supported the building of roads, apartment buildings and dozens of factories.

Some of the most notable factories built and renewed in period between 1950s until the end of 1980s were Zelvoz (called Heroj Srba under the SFR Yugoslavia), renewed in 1966, and a new steel plant built on outskirts of Smederevo at that time, Sartid (formerly MKS), which was completely operational in 1971.

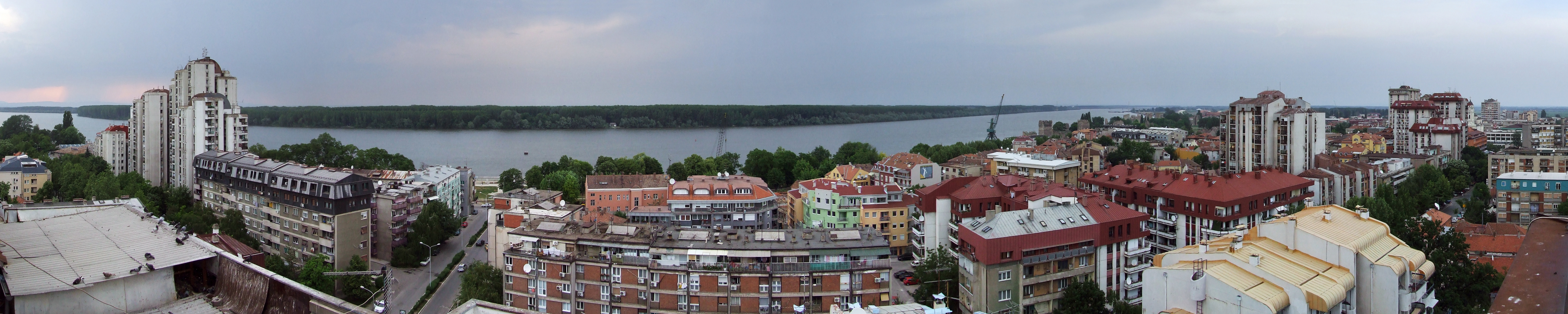
Panorama of the city along the Danube

== Settlements ==
Besides the city of Smederevo, the administrative area includes the following 27 settlements (population according to the 2022 census in brackets):

- Badljevica (315)
- Binovac (357)
- Dobri Do (810)
- Drugovac (1,302)
- Kolari (1,014)
- Kulič (229)
- Landol (1,210)
- Lipe (2,727)
- Lugavčina (2,516)
- Lunjevac (428)
- Mala Krsna (1,550)
- Malo Orašje (816)
- Mihajlovac (2,248)
- Osipaonica (2,873)
- Petrijevo (1,363)
- Radinac (4,714)
- Ralja (1,114)
- Šalinac (501)
- Saraorci (1,704)
- Seone (880)
- Skobalj (1,397)
- Suvodol (690)
- Udovice (1,764)
- Vodanj (1,085)
- Vranovo (2,456)
- Vrbovac (855)
- Vučak (1,751)

== Politics ==
=== City Assembly of Smederevo ===
The results of the 2023 Serbian local elections compared with previous City Assembly elections in Smederevo.

Current composition of the City Assembly of Smederevo

City Assembly of Smederevo election results through years
Electoral lists		% 2023	Seats 2023	% 2020	Seats 2020	% 2016	Seats 2026	% 2012	Seats 2012	% 2008	Seats 2008	% 2004	Seats 2004
SNS	Serbian Progressive Party	46,64	34	56,67	46	49,07	44	11,90	9	—	—	—	—
DS	Democratic Party	11,78*	8*	boycott	boycott	9,09	8	15,80	12	17,82	14	20,32	16
UDS	United Democratic Serbia	10,35	7	6,13	4	—	—	—	—	—	—	—	—
SPS	Socialist Party of Serbia	8,26	6	14,92	12	10,10	9	12,98	10	8,95	7	12,16	10
NDSS	New Democratic Party of Serbia	4,65**	3**	5,38	4	5,37	4	5,39	4	13,41	10	15,11	12
Dveri	Serbian Movement Dveri	3,16	2	–	—	—	—	—	—	—	—	—	—
Ind.	Independents	15,16	10	—	—	8,02	5	33,83	26	16,67	12	13,60	9
SNP	Serbian People’s Party	—	—	6,02	4	2,6	0	—	—	—	—	—	—
NS	New Serbia	—	—	2,33	0	—	—	—	—	—	—	2,72	0
SRS	Serbian Radical Party	–	—	2,09	0	5,00	0	2,51	0	20,50	16	15,08	12
JRS	United Russian Party	—	—	1,90	0	2,12	0	—	—	—	—	—	—
JS	United Serbia	—	—	—	—	3,78	0	—	—	1,32	0	—	—
SDS	Social Democratic Party	—	—	—	—	2,64	0	—	—	—	—	—	—
PSS—BK	Strength of Serbia Movement — Bogoljub Karić	—	—	—	—	—	—	—	—	—	—	10,82	8
URS	United Regions of Serbia	—	—	—	—	—	—	6,51	5	1,98	0	2,77	0
SPO	Serbian Renewal Movement	—	—	—	—	—	—	5,56	4	14,97	11	3,87	3
SDPS	Social Democratic Party of Serbia	—	—	—	—	—	—	2,55	0	—	—	—	—
LDP	Liberal Democratic Party	—	—	—	—	—	—	—	—	3,44	0	—	—
Others	Others	—	—	—	—	2,20	0	3,96	0	0,94	0	3,54	0
Total		100,00	70	100,00	70	100,00	70	100,00	70	100,00	70	100,00	70
Turn out		55,18		45,15 %		50,53 %		51,15 %		55,97		31,41	

- * Democratic Party participated as part of Serbia Against Violence coalition.
- ** New Democratic Party of Serbia participated as part of NADA coalition.

=== Local government ===
Jasmina Vojinović was confirmed as mayor after the election. The local government was formed by the Serbian Progressive Party's alliance, the Socialist Party of Serbia's alliance, and the God–Family–Smederevo group.

== Demographics ==
Historical population
Year	Pop.	±%
1948	14,206	—
1953	18,328	+29.0%
1961	27,182	+48.3%
1971	40,192	+47.9%
1981	55,369	+37.8%
1991	63,884	+15.4%
2002	62,805	−1.7%
2011	64,175	+2.2%
2022	59,261	−7.7%

As of the 2022 census, the population of Smederevo was 59,261.

=== Ethnic groups ===
The ethnic composition of the municipality:

Ethnic group	Population	%
Serbs	89,054	90.94%
Roma	2,317	2.37%
Macedonians	183	
Yugoslavs	144	
Croats	99	
Montenegrins	99	
Hungarians	62	
Albanians	46	
Romanians	40	
Russians	38	
Muslims	27	
Bulgarians	22	
Slovaks	20	
Germans	15	
Vlachs	14	
Ukrainians	13	
Slovenes	11	
Bosniaks	8	
Bunjevci	1	
Others	131	
Regional affiliation	17	
Did not declare	879	
Unknown	4,690	
Total	97,930	

== Economy ==
Smederevo has a recent history of heavy industry and manufacturing, which is a result of intense industrialization of the region during the 1950s-1960s era. Previously, this entire geographical region had a heavy focus on agricultural production.

The city is home to the only operating steel mill in the country, Železara Smederevo, previously known as Sartid, which is situated in the suburb of Radinac. This was privatized and sold to U.S. Steel in 2003 for $33 million. Following the global economic crisis, U.S. Steel sold the plant to the government of Serbia for a symbolic $1 to avoid closing the plant. The plant was renamed Železara Smederevo and at the time employed 5,400 workers. In 2016, the Serbian government managed to strike a deal with a Chinese conglomerate Hesteel Group, which purchased the effective assets for $46 million.

The "Milan Blagojević" home appliance factory is the second largest industry company in the city. Smederevo is also an agricultural area, with significant production of fruit and vines. However, the large agricultural combine "Godomin" has been in financial difficulty since the 1990s and is almost defunct as of 2005. The grape variety known as Smederevka is named after the city. The "Ishrana" factory is an important supplier of bakery products in northern and eastern Serbia.

A U.S.-Dutch consortium, Comico Oil, planned to build a $250 million oil refinery in the industrial zone of the city in 2012. However, the consortium lost its permit to build the refinery after it failed to meet payment deadlines for the land lease a year later.

As of September 2017, Smederevo has one of 14 free economic zones established in Serbia.

The following table gives a preview of total number of registered people employed in legal entities per their core activity (as of 2022):

Activity	Total
Agriculture, forestry and fishing	229
Mining and quarrying	7
Manufacturing	12,481
Electricity, gas, steam and air conditioning supply	223
Water supply; sewerage, waste management and remediation activities	636
Construction	933
Wholesale and retail trade, repair of motor vehicles and motorcycles	4,306
Transportation and storage	1,492
Accommodation and food services	614
Information and communication	305
Financial and insurance activities	373
Real estate activities	48
Professional, scientific and technical activities	751
Administrative and support service activities	442
Public administration and defense; compulsory social security	1,304
Education	1,878
Human health and social work activities	1,616
Arts, entertainment and recreation	332
Other service activities	455
Individual agricultural workers	678
Total	29,102

== Sports ==
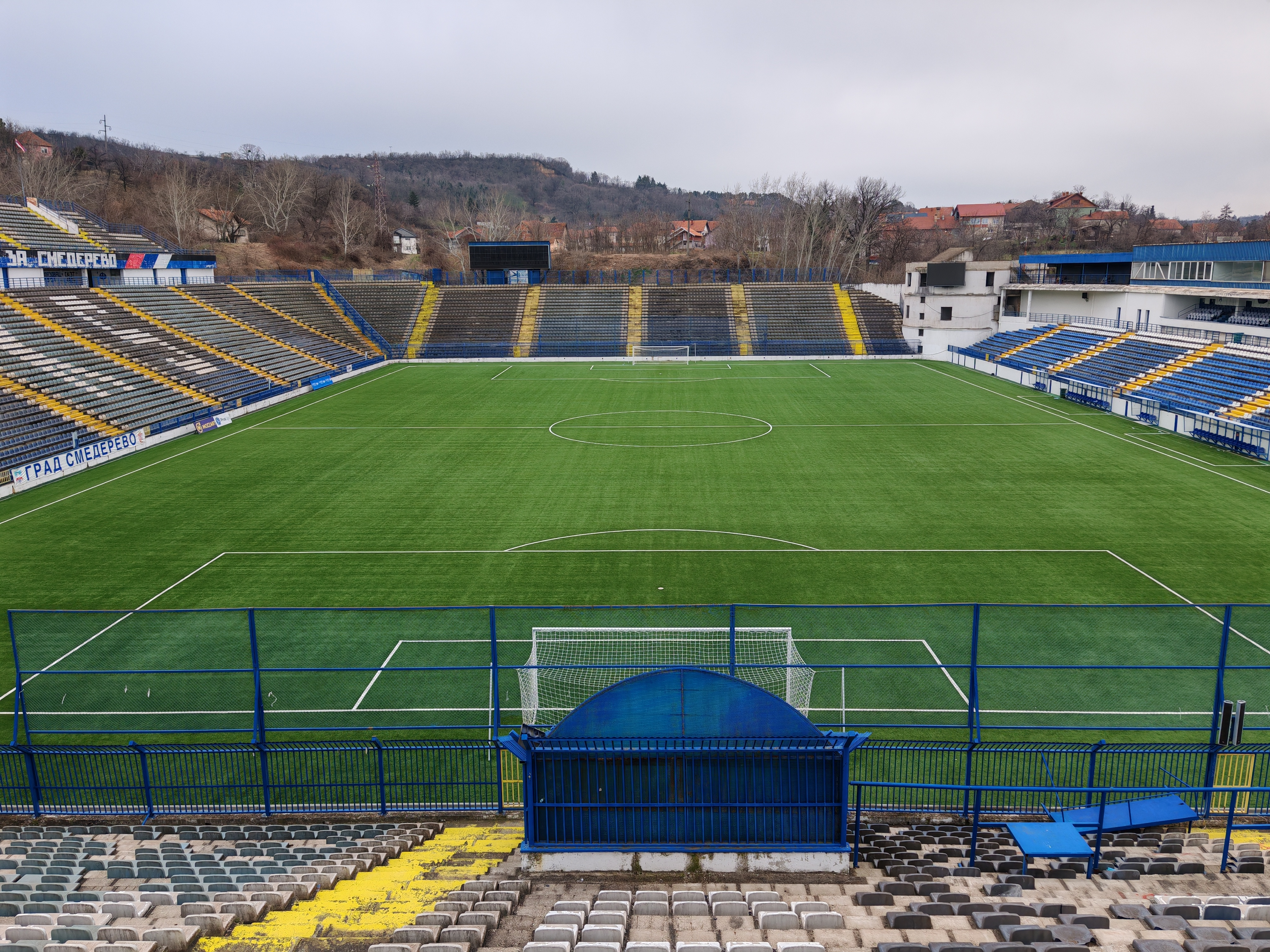
Smederevo Stadium

Smederevo 1924, known as Sartid Smederevo for many years, has played in the top tier of Serbian football. They play their home games at the Smederevo Stadium. Železničar 1930 once competed in the third tier. Smederevo is also the hometown of Aleksandar Mitrović, who is the all-time leading goalscorer of the Serbia national football team.

== Transportation ==
The river traffic infrastructure of the city of Smederevo consists of Danube waterway, old port, marina, new port, terminal for liquid Naftna Industrija Srbije loads, as well as smaller piers (gravel pits) which are located along the bank in the industrial zone. The port is registered for international traffic and is located in the very center of the city of Smederevo.

It has reloading capacities which can realize 1.5 million freight tons a year. By 2019, the Government of Serbia invested 9.5 million euros for new railway construction built for the needs of Port of Smederevo. It was also announced that starting in 2020, the Government of Serbia plans to invest 93 million euros for the construction of new Port Terminal.

== Tourism ==
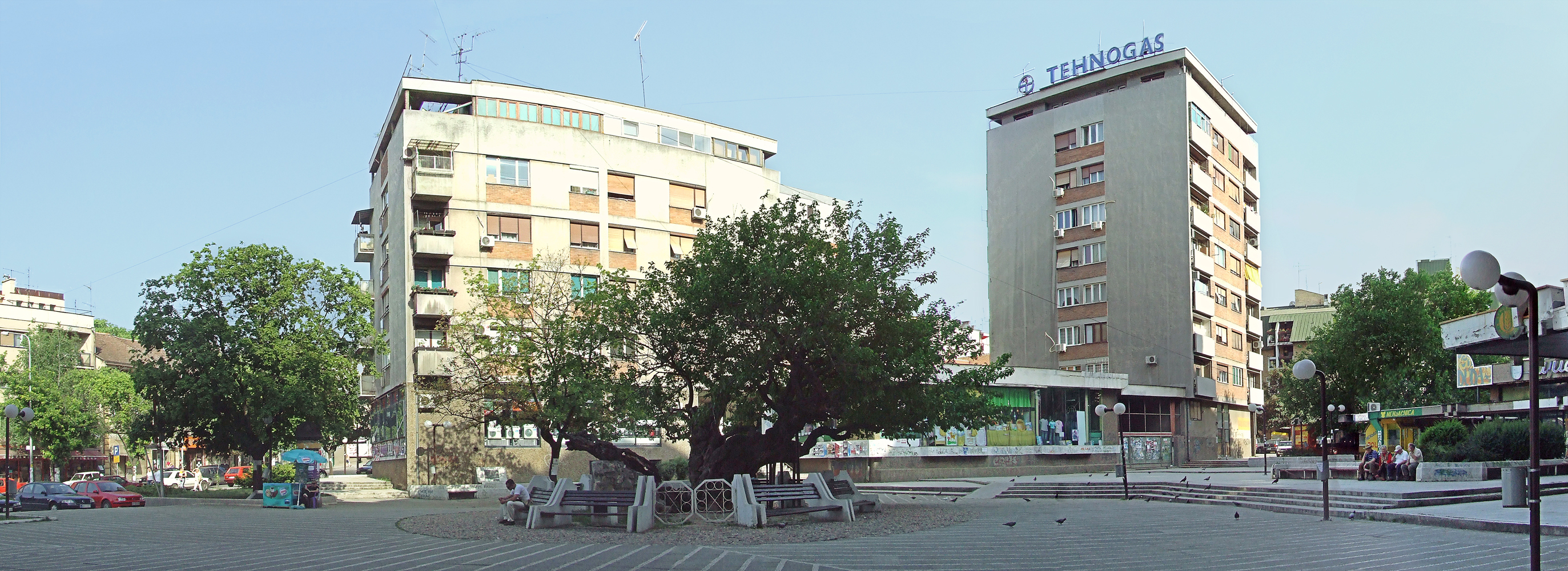
Karađorđe's mulberry, a tree under which Karađorđe reputedly received the city keys during the 1805 uprising.

Among the main tourist attractions in the city are the Smederevo Fortress and the Villa Zlatni Breg.

There is an old white mulberry tree in the center of Smederevo. Called Karađorđev Dud ("Karađorđe's Mulberry"), it is estimated to be over 300 years old. Though there are no historical sources to specifically confirm that, it is believed that under this tree dizdar Muharem Guša, Ottoman commander of the fortress, handed over the keys to the city to Karađorđe on 8 November 1805, after the city was liberated during the First Serbian Uprising. In May 2018 the tree was declared a third category natural monument, as the first "living" monument in Smederevo. The three is supported by metallic pipes, but there is an initiative that two sculptures, shaped like a male and female hand, should be installed instead.

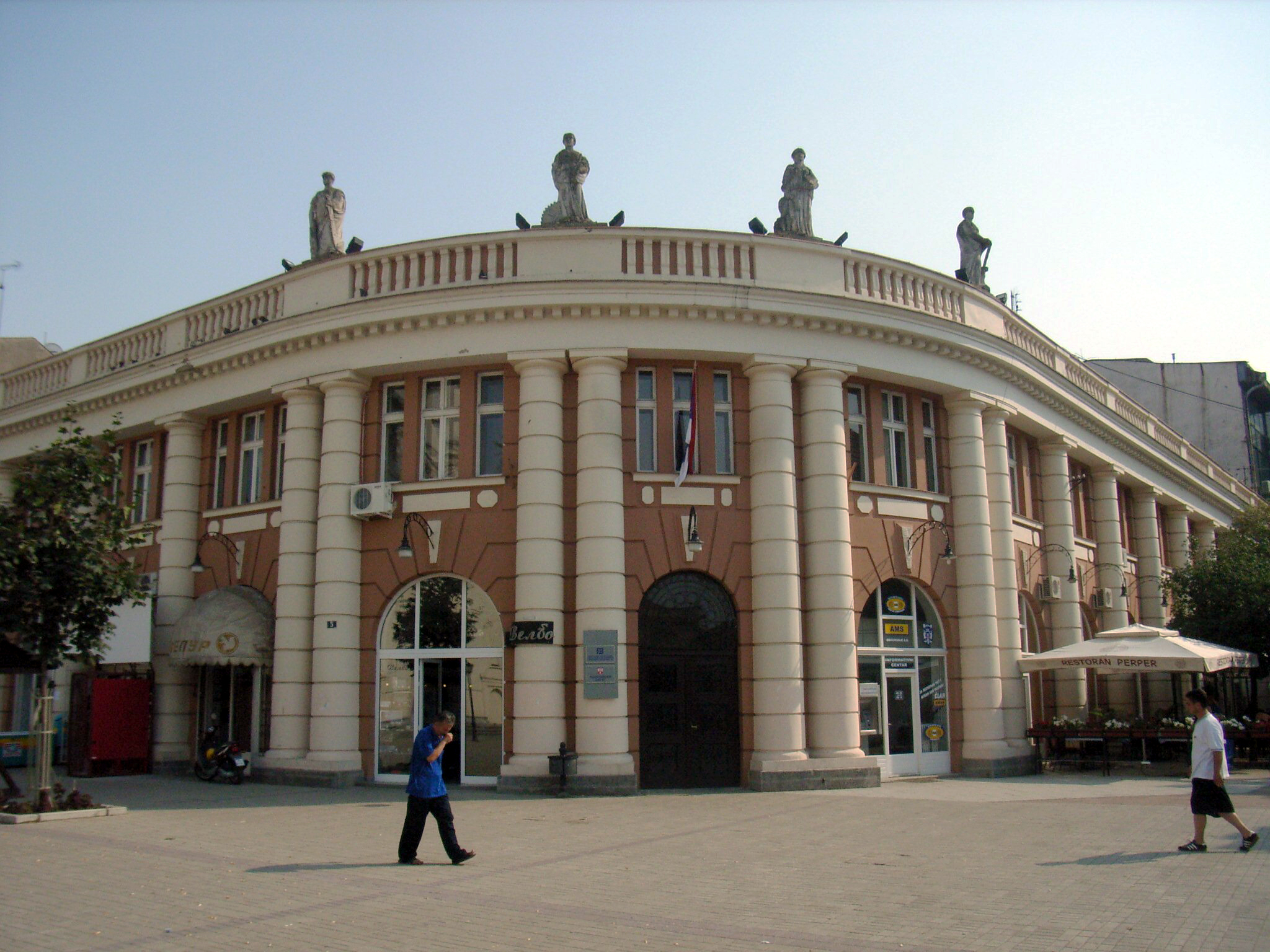
Hotel Grand – Regija

== Twin towns ==
Smederevo is twinned with:

- (Bosnia and Herzegovina) Pale, Bosnia Herzegovina
- Volos, Greece
- Tangshan, China

== See also ==
- Municipalities of Serbia
- Populated places of Serbia
- Smederevo Airport

== Sources ==
- Chisholm, Hugh, ed. (1911). "Semendria" . Encyclopædia Britannica. Vol. 24 (11th ed.). Cambridge University Press. p. 616.
