= Hetin =

Hetin Хетин (Serbian) Tamásfalva (Hungarian)
- Village (Selo)
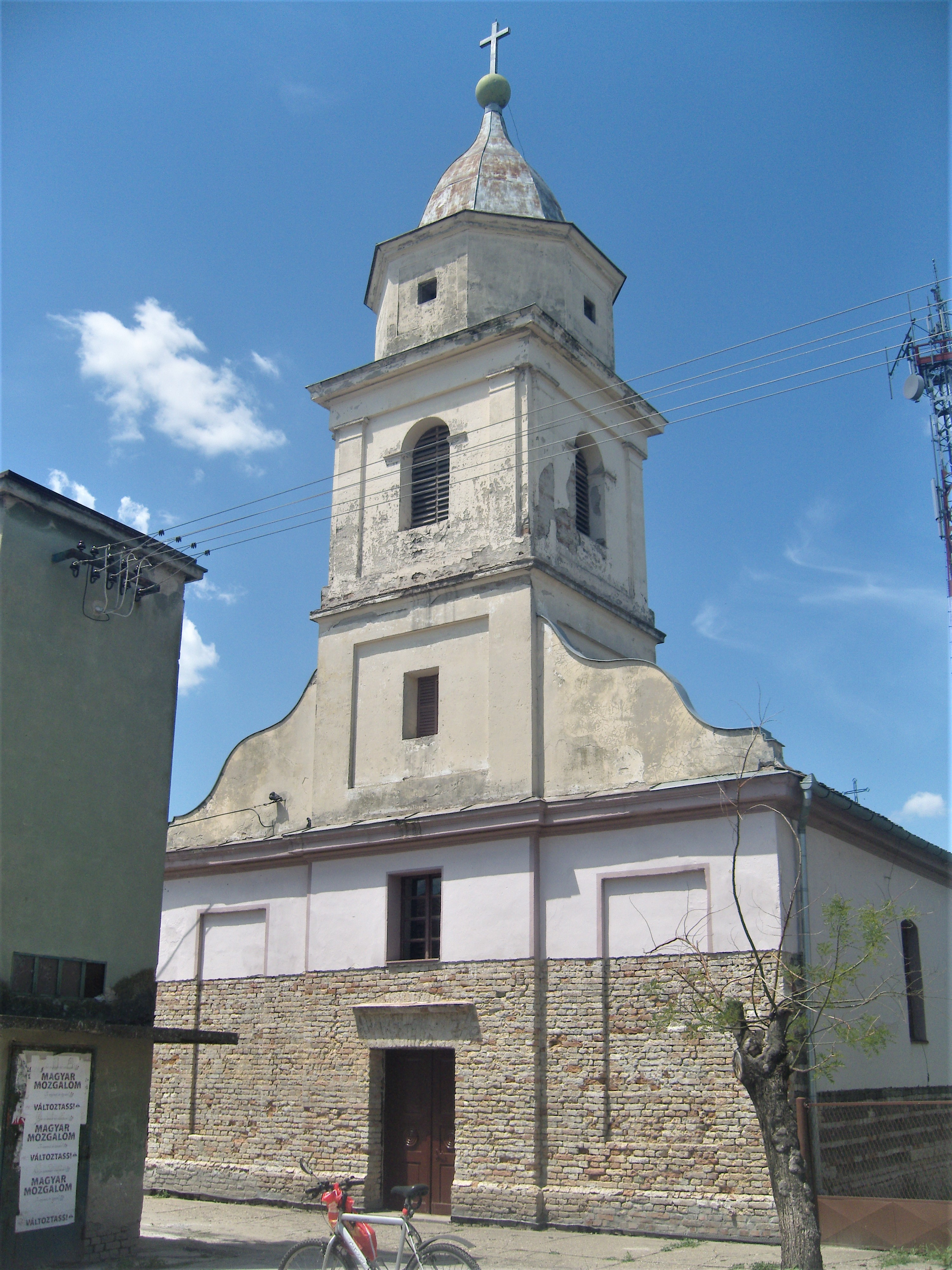
- The Holy Trinity Catholic Church

- Location within Serbia Hetin (Serbia) Hetin (Europe)
- Coordinates: 45°33′20″N 20°41′24″E
- Country: Serbia
- Province: Vojvodina
- District: Central Banat
- Municipalities: Žitište
- Elevation: 65 m (213 ft)

Population (2002)
  - Hetin: 763
- Time zone: UTC+1 (CET)
  - Summer (DST): UTC+2 (CEST)
- Postal code: 23235
- Area code: +381(0)23
- Car plates: ZR

Hetin (Serbian Cyrillic: Хетин; Hungarian: Tamásfalva or Hetény; German: Hettin or Tomsdorf) is a village in Serbia. It is situated in the Žitište municipality, in the Central Banat District, Vojvodina province. The village has a Hungarian ethnic majority (53.21%) and its population numbering 763 people (2002 census).

== Geography ==
The village is located near the border between Serbia and Romania. Closest neighbouring places are Srpski Itebej, Radojevo, Srpska Crnja, Vojvoda Stepa, Nova Crnja, Velike Livade, and Banatsko Karađorđevo. The postal code of the village is 23235, and the phone area code is 023 (telephone numbers in the village start with 832-).

== History ==
Hetin was founded in 1841 by tobacco cultivators. In 1897, Hetin (Hetény) and Tamašfalva (Tamásfalva) were merged into one single village.

== Demographics ==
Ethnic groups in the village include (2002 census):

- 406 (53.21%) Hungarians
- 306 (40.11%) Serbs
- others.

== Historical population ==
- 1961: 2,008
- 1971: 1,604
- 1981: 1,139
- 1991: 881
- 2002: 763

== Genealogical Records ==
- Up to 1860, filial parish of Cărpiniș.
- After 1860 filial parish of Nemačka Crnja (Srpska Crnja).
- Separate RC church books only starting 1899 (today at Zrenjanin Parish).

== See also ==
- List of places in Serbia
- List of cities, towns and villages in Vojvodina
