= Molin, Banat =

Village in Banat, Serbia

Coordinates: 45.643611°N 20.539167°E

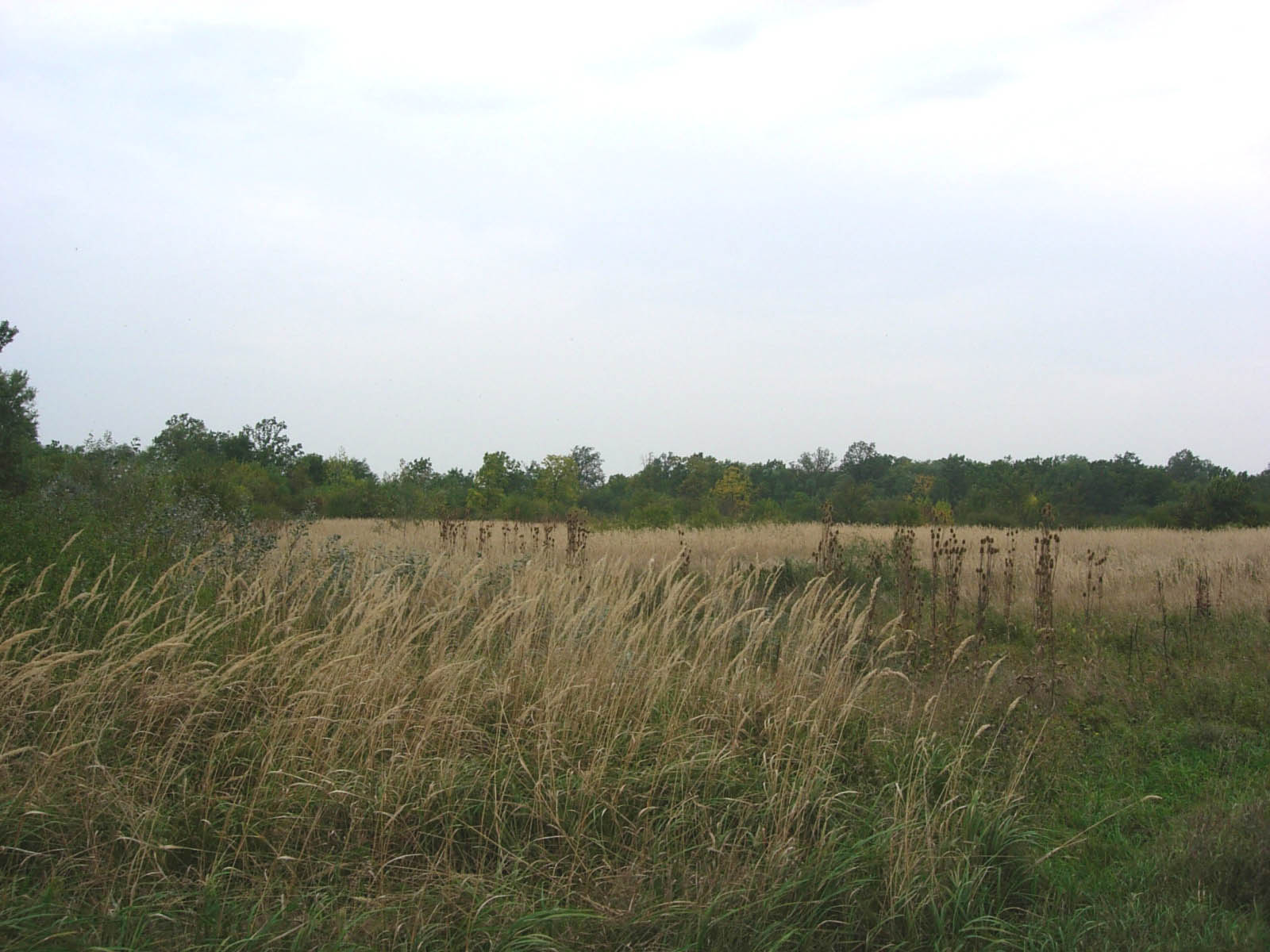
The Molin Forest

Molin (Serbian Cyrillic: Молин) was a village in Banat, Serbia. The village was founded in 1832 and existed until 1961. It was located in the Nova Crnja Municipality, Central Banat District, Vojvodina Province. The village was abandoned because of groundwater. Today the location of the former village is Molin Forest, which is used as a hunting ground.

== Name ==
In Serbian the village is known as Molin (Молин), in German as Mollydorf, and in Hungarian as Mollyfalva.

== Geography ==
Molin was located at 45°38'37N and 20°32'21E, between Aleksandrovo, Banatsko Karađorđevo, Torda, Bašaid, Banatska Topola, Toba, and Nova Crnja. Today, the area of the former Molin village administratively belongs to the settlement of Nova Crnja.

== History ==
It was founded during Austrian Habsburg administration (in 1832) by German settlers. First census from 1836 registered 558 inhabitants in the village. The village was administratively a part of the Torontal County within the Habsburg Kingdom of Hungary. In 1848-1849, the village was part of autonomous Serbian Vojvodina, and in 1849-1860 it was part of the Voivodeship of Serbia and Banat of Temeschwar, a separate Austrian land. After the abolishment of the voivodeship in 1860, the village was again included into Torontal County. It was also part of the Hatzfeld district within the county. In 1910, the village had German ethnic majority.

In 1918, as part of the Banat, Bačka and Baranja region, the village firstly became part of the Kingdom of Serbia and then part of the Kingdom of Serbs, Croats and Slovenes (later renamed to Yugoslavia). From 1918 to 1922 Molin was part of the Veliki Bečkerek county, from 1922 to 1929 part of the Belgrade oblast, and from 1929 to 1941 part of the Danube Banovina. During the Axis occupation of Yugoslavia from 1941 to 1944, the village was part of the German-administered Banat region that had special status within the Axis puppet state of Serbia.

At the end of World War II, in 1944, one part of local German inhabitants left from the area, together with defeated German army. Those who remained in the region were sent to local communist prison camps, and one of these camps was located in Molin. After communist prison camps were dissolved (in 1948), most of the remaining German population left Yugoslavia mainly because of economic reasons.

Since 1944, the village was part of Yugoslav Vojvodina, which, from 1945, was an autonomous province of new socialist Serbia within Yugoslavia. After the war, the village was populated by settlers who mostly came from neighboring settlements. According to the 1953 census, Molin had a Serb ethnic majority. In 1956, the village was devastated by catastrophic flood and was resettled and abandoned in the following year. Most of the residents moved to nearby settlements of Nova Crnja and Vojvoda Stepa. Today, there is a Molin Forest on the location where Molin village once was.

== Historical population of the village ==
- 1869: 794
- 1880: 783
- 1890: 936
- 1900: 1,202
- 1910: 1,060
- 1921: 1,272
- 1931: 1,203
- 1948: 423
- 1953: 1,121

== See also ==
- List of places in Serbia
- List of cities, towns and villages in Vojvodina
