= Dejan Panić =

Serbian politician

Dejan Panić (Serbian Cyrillic: Дејан Панић; born 21 February 1980) is a Serbian politician. He has served in the Assembly of Vojvodina since 2020 as a member of the Social Democratic Party of Serbia (SDPS).

== Private career ==
Panić holds a Bachelor of Science degree in management engineering. He lives in Nova Crnja.

== Politician ==
=== Municipal politics ===
The SDPS contested the 2012 Serbian local elections in Nova Crnja on the electoral list of the Socialist Party of Serbia. Panić received the fifth position on the list and narrowly missed election when it won four mandates. The SDPS subsequently joined a local coalition government, however, and Panić was appointed to the municipal council (i.e., the executive branch of the local government) on 25 May 2012.

The SDPS later formed an alliance with the Serbian Progressive Party. Panić received the seventh position on the Progressive list in Nova Crnja for the 2016 local elections and was this time elected to the assembly when the list won exactly seven mandates. He did not run for re-election at the local level in 2020.

=== Assembly of Vojvodina ===
The SDPS's alliance with the Progressive Party continued in the 2020 Vojvodina provincial election. Panić was awarded the twenty-fifth position on the Progressive list and was elected when the list won a majority victory with seventy-six out of 120 mandates. He is a member of the Aleksandar Vučić – For Our Children parliamentary group and a member of the assembly committee on establishing equal authenticity of provincial legislation in the languages in official use.

As of 2020, he was the co-ordinator of the SDPS in the Central Banat District.
