= Crnja =

Crnja can refer to:

- Nova Crnja, a village and municipality in Vojvodina, Serbia.
- Srpska Crnja, a village in Vojvodina, Serbia.
