= Toba, Nova Crnja =

Toba Тоба (Serbian) Tóba (Hungarian)
- Village (Selo)
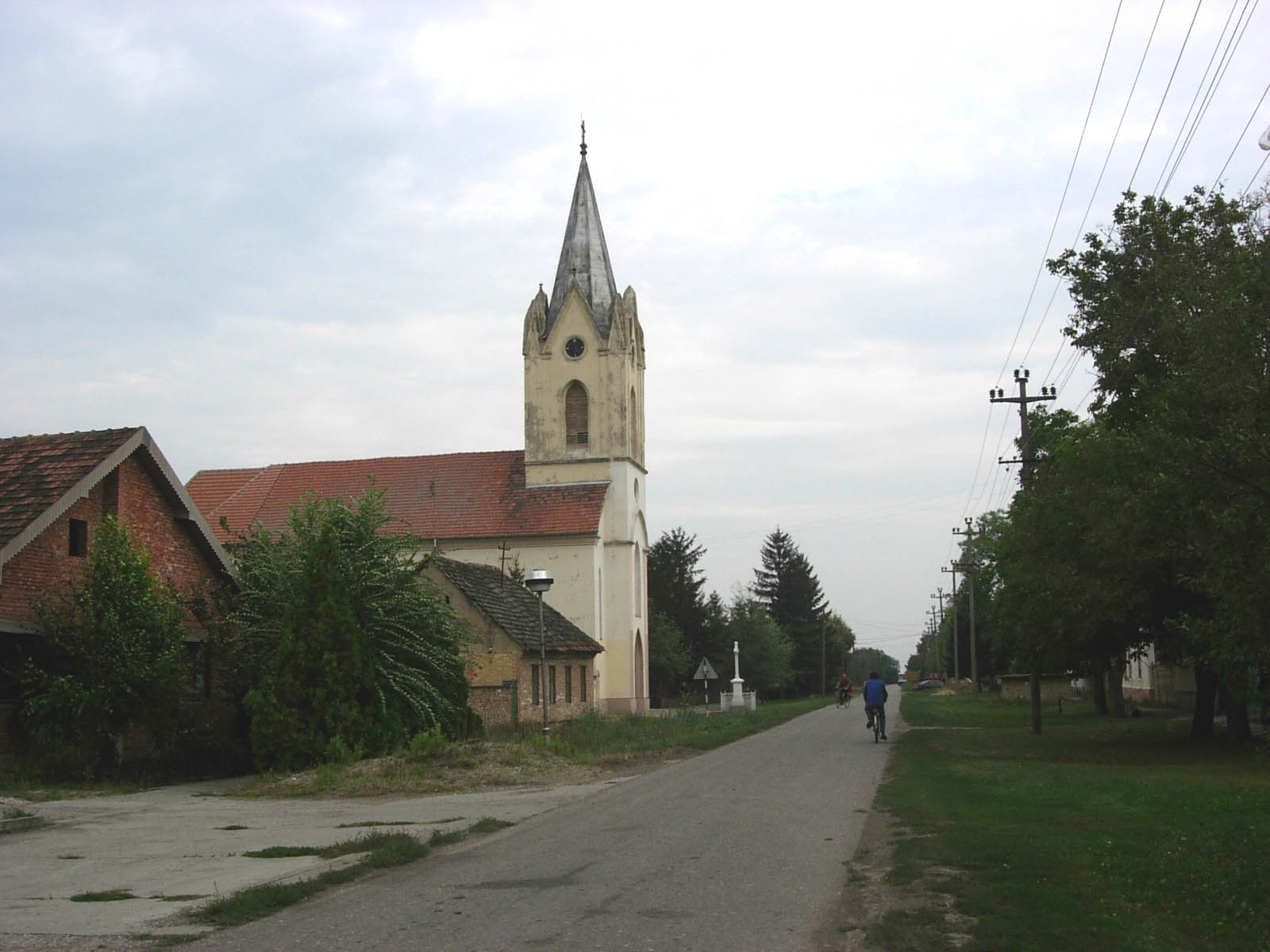
- The Holy Trinity Catholic Church

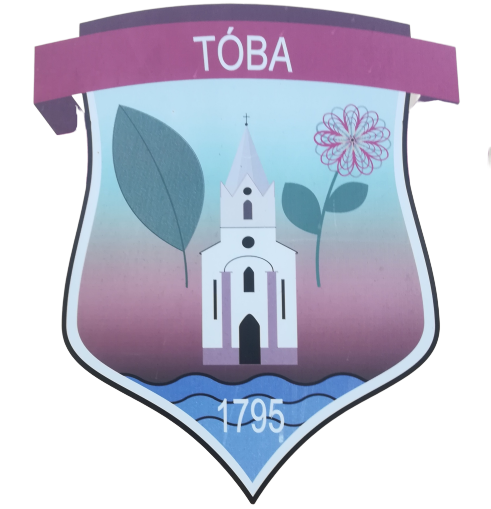
- Coat of arms

- Location of Toba within Serbia Toba (Serbia) Toba (Europe)
- Coordinates: 45°41′10″N 20°33′13″E
- Country: Serbia
- Province: Vojvodina
- District: Central Banat
- Municipalities: Nova Crnja
- Elevation: 68 m (223 ft)

Population (2002)
  - Toba: 691
- Time zone: UTC+1 (CET)
  - Summer (DST): UTC+2 (CEST)
- Postal code: 23222
- Area code: +381(0)23
- Car plates: ZR

Toba (Serbian Cyrillic: Тоба, Hungarian: Tóba) is a village in Serbia. It is situated in the Nova Crnja municipality, in the Central Banat District, Vojvodina province. The village has a Hungarian ethnic majority (84.08%) and a population of 691 people (2002 census).

== History ==
The Field Marshal, Count Robert Zichy-Ferraris from the prominent Hungarian family of Zichy, established the settlement of the Toba in 1789. During the first half or 19th century, Zichy sold his property to Henry, Count of Chambord, pretender to the throne of France. Henry appointed Barron Cyril Billet as his governor. Baron Billet and his sons were managing property for approximately 50 years. During that period, they were playing important role in the social life of the region. The castle, small family residential house and Roman Catholic Church of Holy Trinity were built during that period. By the mid-19th century, settlement was known as the Great Toba, and the population of the village mostly consisted of the tobacco growers. After the death of Henry, Robert I, Duke of Parma inherited his property. After Duke's death, his son Elias of Bourbon-Parma sold the property to the Bank of Timișoara. After the World War I, whole region, which was once part of the Austro-Hungarian Monarchy, become the part of newly formed Kingdom of Yugoslavia.

After the World War II, modern Primary School with kindergarten, Cultural Center, Fire station and ambulance were built in the village.

== Historical population ==
- 1961: 1,401
- 1971: 1,232
- 1981: 1,099
- 1991: 822

== See also ==
- List of places in Serbia
- List of cities, towns and villages in Vojvodina
