= Velike Livade =

Velike Livade may refer to:

- A former name of Aleksandrovo (Nova Crnja)
- A former name of a village taken over by the Majdanpek mines industrial complex
