= Vladimir Boberić =

Vladimir Boberić (secular name: Vladislav Boberić, Srpska Klarija (today Radojevo, Banat, Austria-Hungary, 22 October 1873 – Budapest, Hungary, 17 February 1918) was a bishop of the Serbian Orthodox Church and professor of music.

== Life ==
Bishop Vladimir was born Vladislav Boberić on 3 November 1873 (Gregorian Calendar) in Srpska Klarija (today Radojevo) in Banat, to father Mladen, a priest, and Aneta Maširević, niece of Patriarch Samuil (Maširević). He finished elementary school in Vranjevo, high school in Novi Sad and the seminary of Sremski Karlovci.

At the invitation of the Metropolitan Nikolaj of Dabro-Bosnia, he moved to Sarajevo, where, after passing the catechetical exam, he was appointed a full professor at the Sarajevo Gymnasium.

== Monastic life ==
He received the name Vladimir during tonsure into the monastic order. After being ordained to the rank of deacon and presbyter, he was appointed professor of music at the Reljevska Bogoslovija (Reljevska Seminary).

As the temporary rector of the seminary, he was appointed bishop of Boka Kotorska on 10 October 1911.

Vladimir Boberić practiced catechetics, canon law, and was very successful in church music, leaving behind many notable compositions as well as a comprehensive series of articles entitled Slike iz istorije crkvenoga pjesništva i muzika u pravoslavnoj crkvi (meaning "on the historical development of Christian poetry and psalmody, on its origins and theoretical system") in the Dabro-bosanski istočnik, a publication of the Eparchy of Dabro-Bosnia.

He died in Budapest on 17 February 1918, and was buried in Vranjevo in Banat.
