= Srpska Crnja =

Srpska Crnja Српска Црња (Serbian)
- Village (Selo)
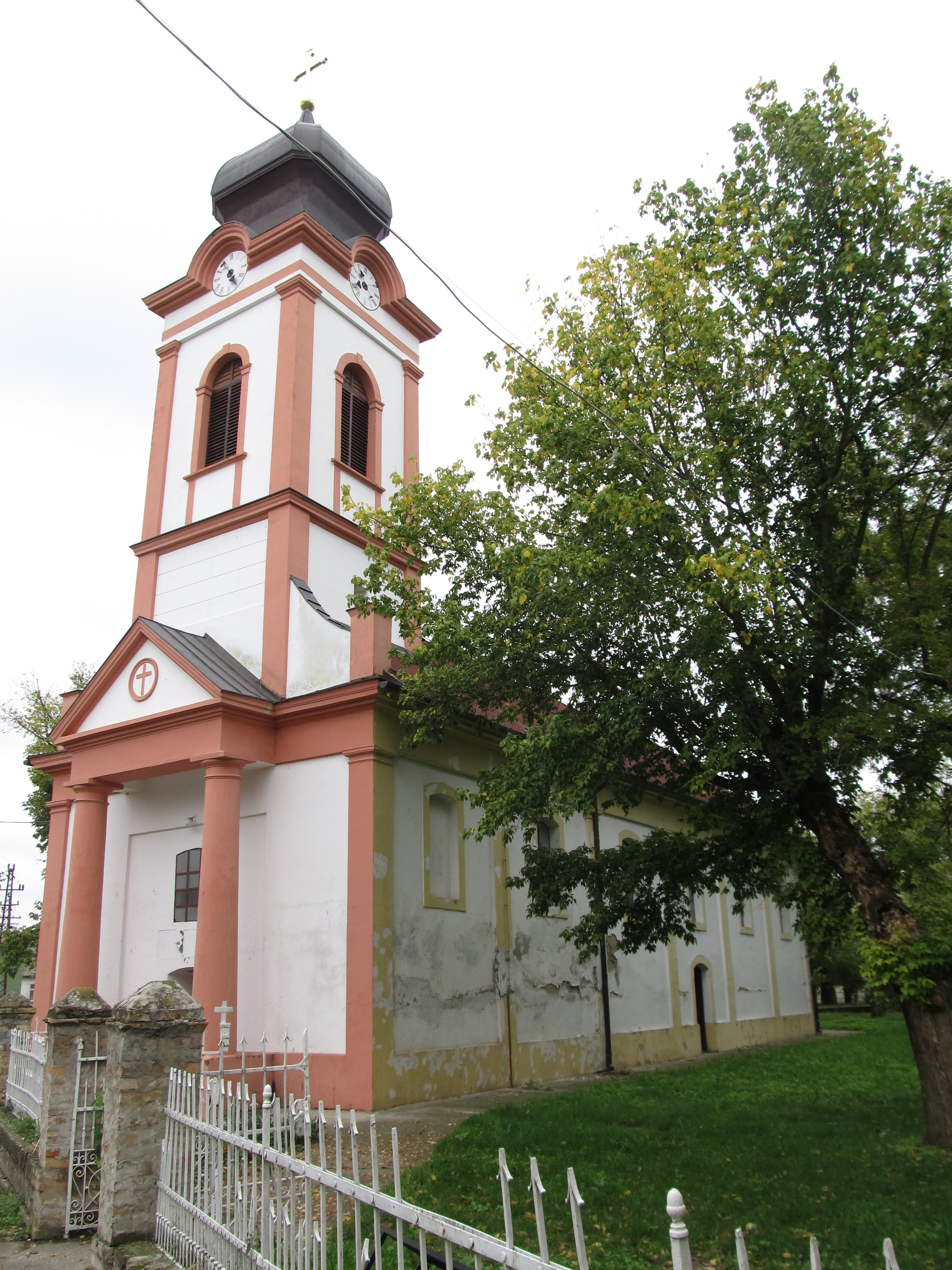
- The Orthodox Church

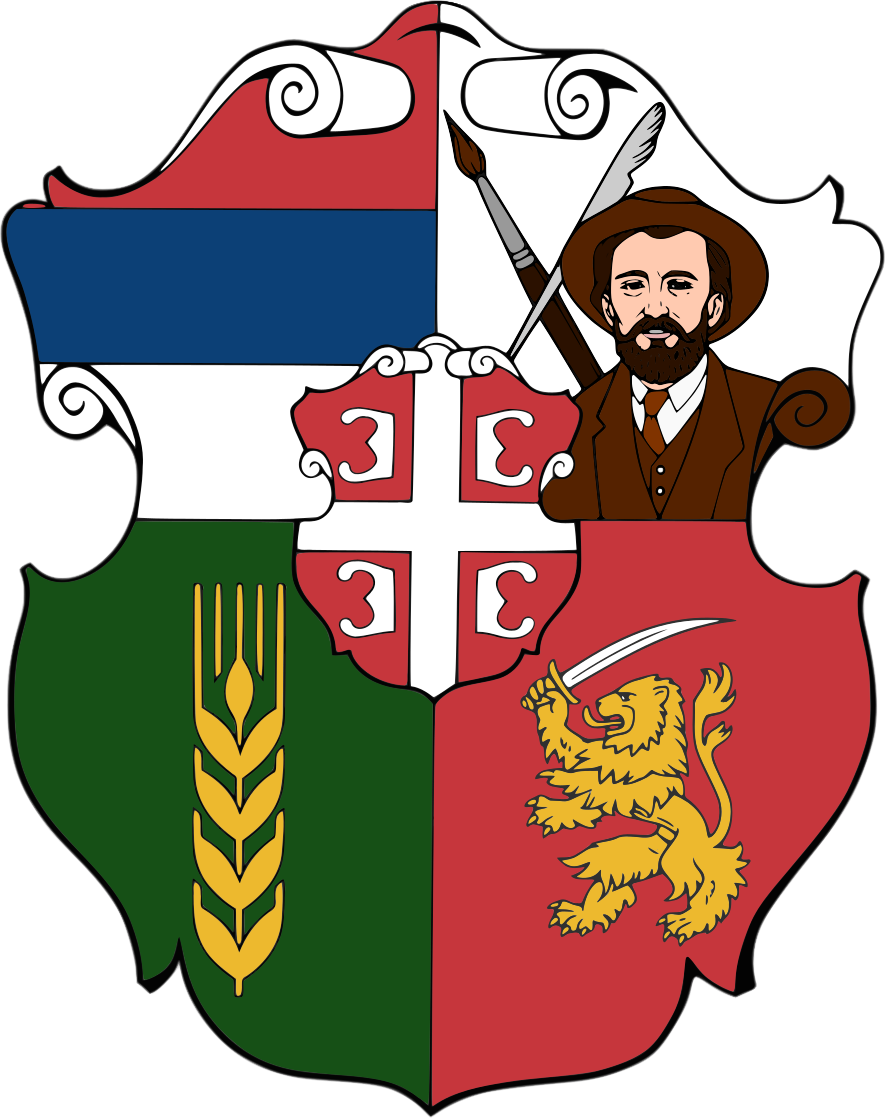
- Coat of arms

- Location of Srpska Crnja within Serbia Srpska Crnja (Serbia) Srpska Crnja (Europe)
- Coordinates: 45°43′14″N 20°41′11″E
- Country: Serbia
- Province: Vojvodina
- District: Central Banat
- Municipalities: Nova Crnja
- Elevation: 72 m (236 ft)

Population (2011)
  - Srpska Crnja: 3,753
- Time zone: UTC+1 (CET)
  - Summer (DST): UTC+2 (CEST)
- Postal code: 23220
- Area code: +381(0)23
- Car plates: ZR

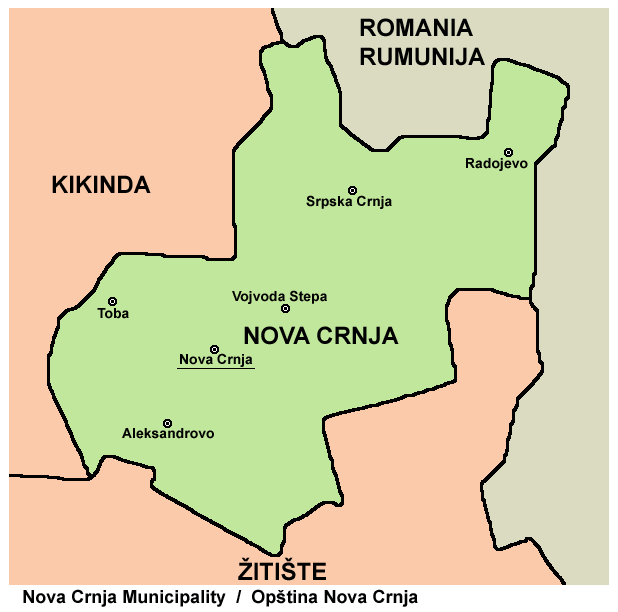
Map of Nova Crnja municipality, showing the location of Srpska Crnja

Srpska Crnja (Serbian Cyrillic: Српска Црња; Hungarian: Szerbcsernye; Romanian: Cernea Neamț) is a village in Serbia, situated in central-east Banat alongside the border with Romania. It is located in Nova Crnja municipality, Central Banat District, Province of Vojvodina. It is about 120 km (74.6 mi) away from the capital city of Belgrade, 113 km (70.2 mi) from Novi Sad, 9 km (5.6 mi) south-east of Kikinda and 6 km (3.7 mi) south-west of Jimbolia, Romania. The village has a population of 3753 people (2011 census) and most of its inhabitants are ethnic Serbs (83.77%).

== Name ==
Name of the village comes from Serbian words "srpska" (meaning "Serb", "Serbian") and "crno" (meaning "black"). In Serbian the village is known as Srpska Crnja / Српска Црња (formerly also Crnja / Црња), in German as Serbisch-Zerne or Serbish Zerne, and in Hungarian as Szerbcsernye (formerly also Csernye, Czernya, Rácz-Czernya, and Szerb-Csernya).

Former German-populated settlement that is now part of this village was known as Nemačka Crnja (Немачка Црња) in Serbian, Deutsch-Zerne or Deutsch-Tschernja in German, and Németcsernye or Nemacske-Csernye in Hungarian.

== Geography ==
Although Srpska Crnja is the largest settlement in Nova Crnja municipality, the municipal center is located in the village of Nova Crnja, since this settlement has a more favourable geographic position. The former railroad that linked Srpska Crnja to other settlements is no longer operational.

== History ==
Srpska Crnja is an old settlement. The first historical records mentioning the settlement are from 1373. In this time, it was part of the Temesiensis County within the medieval Kingdom of Hungary. In the 16th-17th century, it was part of the Ottoman Empire and administratively belonged to the Temeşvar Eyalet. It was recorded as populated settlement in 1660, but was later resettled. In this time, it was known as Crnja and was populated by ethnic Serbs.

In the first half of the 18th century, this area was included into the Habsburg monarchy, but Crnja was without inhabitants in this time. The first time it appeared on a map was in 1723. In the middle of the 18th century, Crnja was populated by Serbs and Romanians. Until 1778, the village was part of the Banat of Temeswar, which was a separate Habsburg land. In 1778, it was included into the Habsburg Kingdom of Hungary and was administratively a part of the Torontal County. In 1787, population of the village numbered 1,394 residents. In 1790, German colonists founded a new settlement nearby and it was named Nemačka Crnja i.e. the "German Crnja". It was located in the north-east from the original settlement. The older settlement, hence, became known as Srpska Crnja i.e. the "Serb Crnja".

In 1848-1849, the area was part of the autonomous Serbian Vojvodina and in 1849-1860 part of the Voivodeship of Serbia and Banat of Temeschwar, a separate Austrian land. After abolishment of the voivodeship in 1860, the area was again included into Torontal County. In 1910, Srpska Crnja had a Serb ethnic majority, while Nemačka Crnja had a German ethnic majority. Before the First World War, population of Srpska Crnja numbered 3,924 residents, while population of Nemačka Crnja numbered 3,392 residents. If population of two settlements is counted together, largest ethnic group in the area were Serbs.

In 1918, as part of the Banat, Bačka and Baranja region, the area was firstly included into the Kingdom of Serbia and then into the Kingdom of Serbs, Croats and Slovenes (later known as Yugoslavia). From 1918 to 1922 the area was part of the Veliki Bečkerek County, from 1922 to 1929 part of the Belgrade Oblast, and from 1929 to 1941 part of the Danube Banovina. Between the two World Wars, some families of Serbian World War I volunteers were settled in the area. In 1931, population of both settlements numbered 9,100 people.

During the Axis occupation of Yugoslavia in World War II, from 1941 to 1944, the area was included into the German-administered Banat region that had special status within the Axis puppet state of Serbia. The German population of Nemačka Crnja numbered over 3,000 people in 1944. At the end of World War II, in 1944, one part of local German inhabitants left from the area, together with defeated German army. Those who remained in the region were sent to local communist prison camps. After communist prison camps were dissolved (in 1948), most of the remaining German population left Yugoslavia mainly because of economic reasons.

Since 1944, the area was part of Yugoslav Vojvodina, which, from 1945, was an autonomous province of new socialist Serbia within Yugoslavia. After the war, some Serb families from Bosnia settled in the area. In that time, two settlements were administratively joined into the single village. In recent times, population of the village is decreasing. As a result of the current bad economic situation in the Banat region, a sizable number of local Serbs is emigrating to large Serbian cities or to other countries (like Austria and Germany), searching for jobs.

== Ethnic groups (2002 census) ==
- Serbs = 3,672 (83.78%)
- Romani = 413 (9.42%)
- Hungarians = 163 (3.72%)
- others.

== Historical population ==
- 1948: 8,220
- 1953: 7,977
- 1961: 7,376
- 1971: 6,001
- 1981: 5,467
- 1991: 5,046
- 2002: 4,383
- 2011: 3,753

== Sights ==
- Orthodox church built in 1775, with Đura Jakšić's religious paintings (icons) on the altar.
- Memorial museum of Đura Jakšić.
- Bust of Đura Jakšić located in the nave of the Orthodox church.
- Monument to people of Srpska Crnja who were killed on October 5 - Freedom Day in memory of the liberation from German occupation in 1944, also located in the nave of the Orthodox church.
- The oldest grave monument, from 1790.
- The Lipar's Days in Srpska Crnja is a manifestation dedicated to Crnja's beloved Đura Jakšić. The tradition started in 1962.
- Motel Kastel built as a castle in 1943 for general Najhauzen during the Nazi German occupation.
- Catholic church.

== Notable residents ==
The poet and artist Đura Jakšić was born and grew up in the village.

== Gallery ==
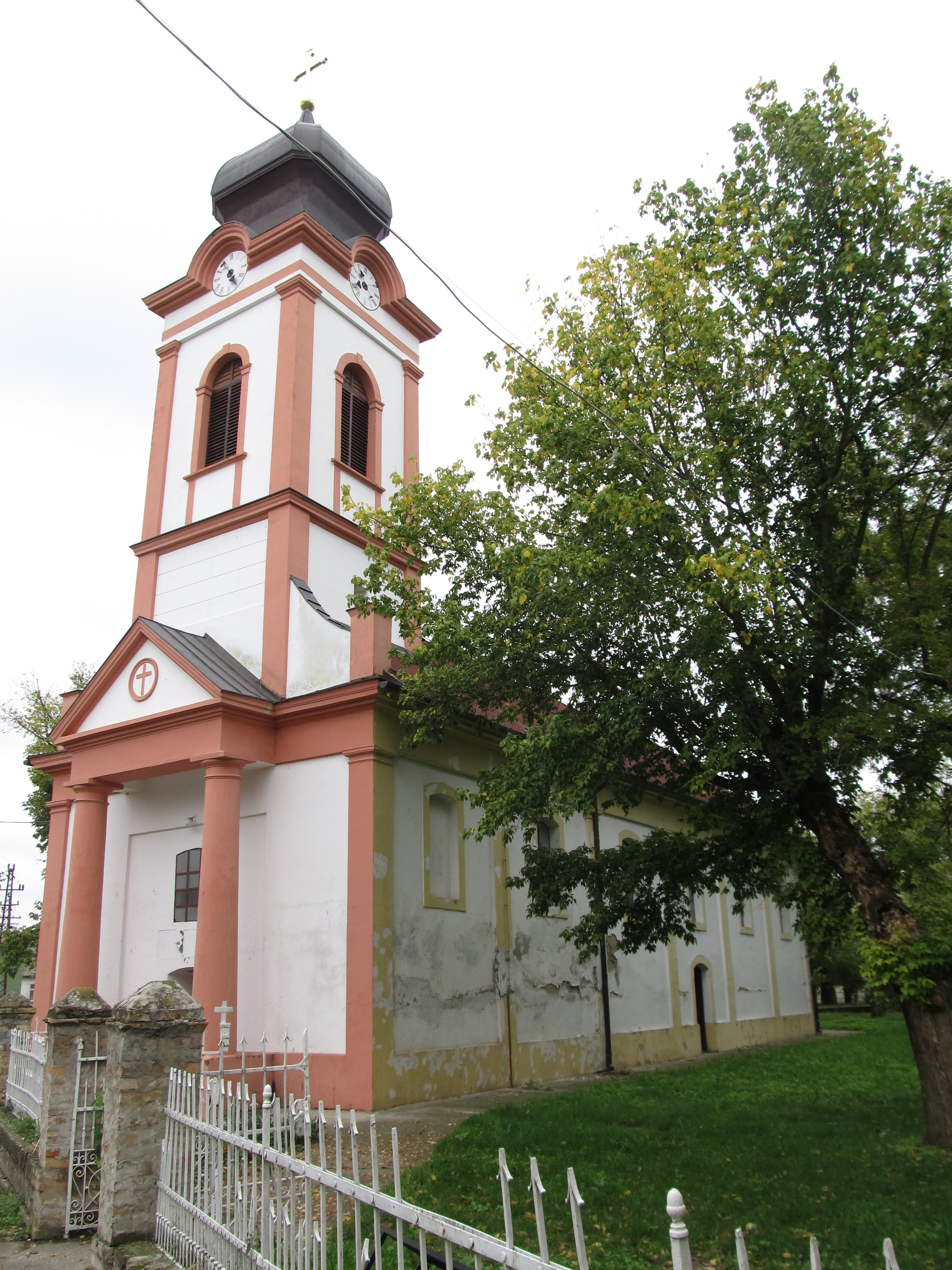
Orthodox church in Srpska Crnja

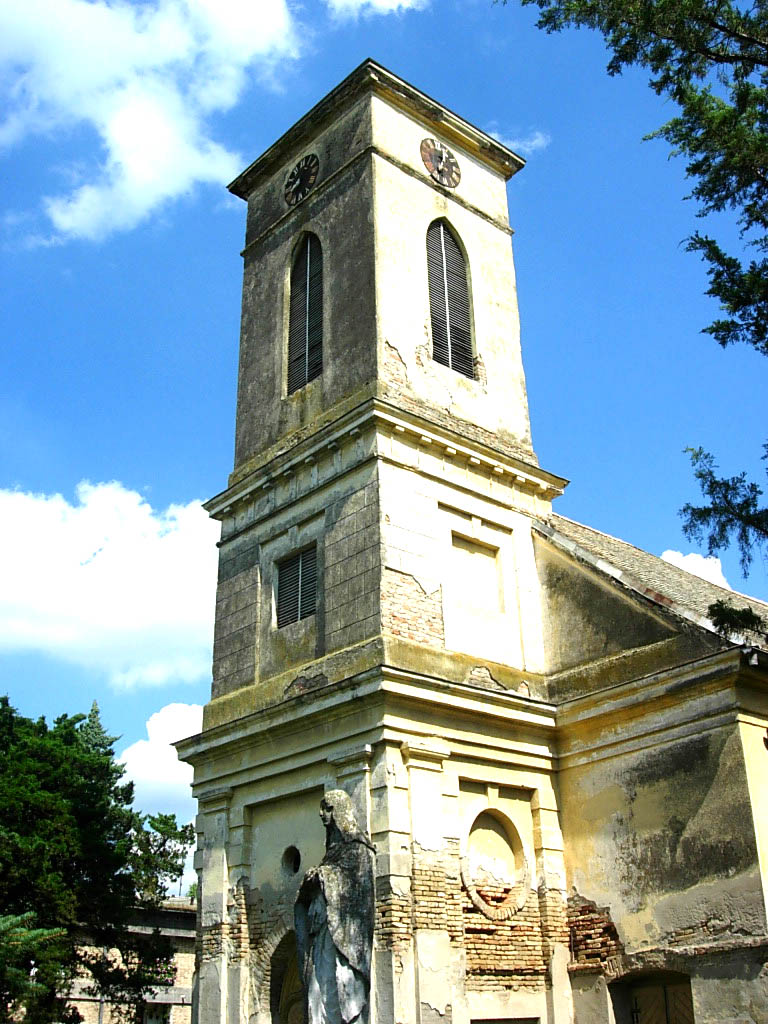
The St. Joseph, spouse of Bl. Vir. Mary Catholic Church

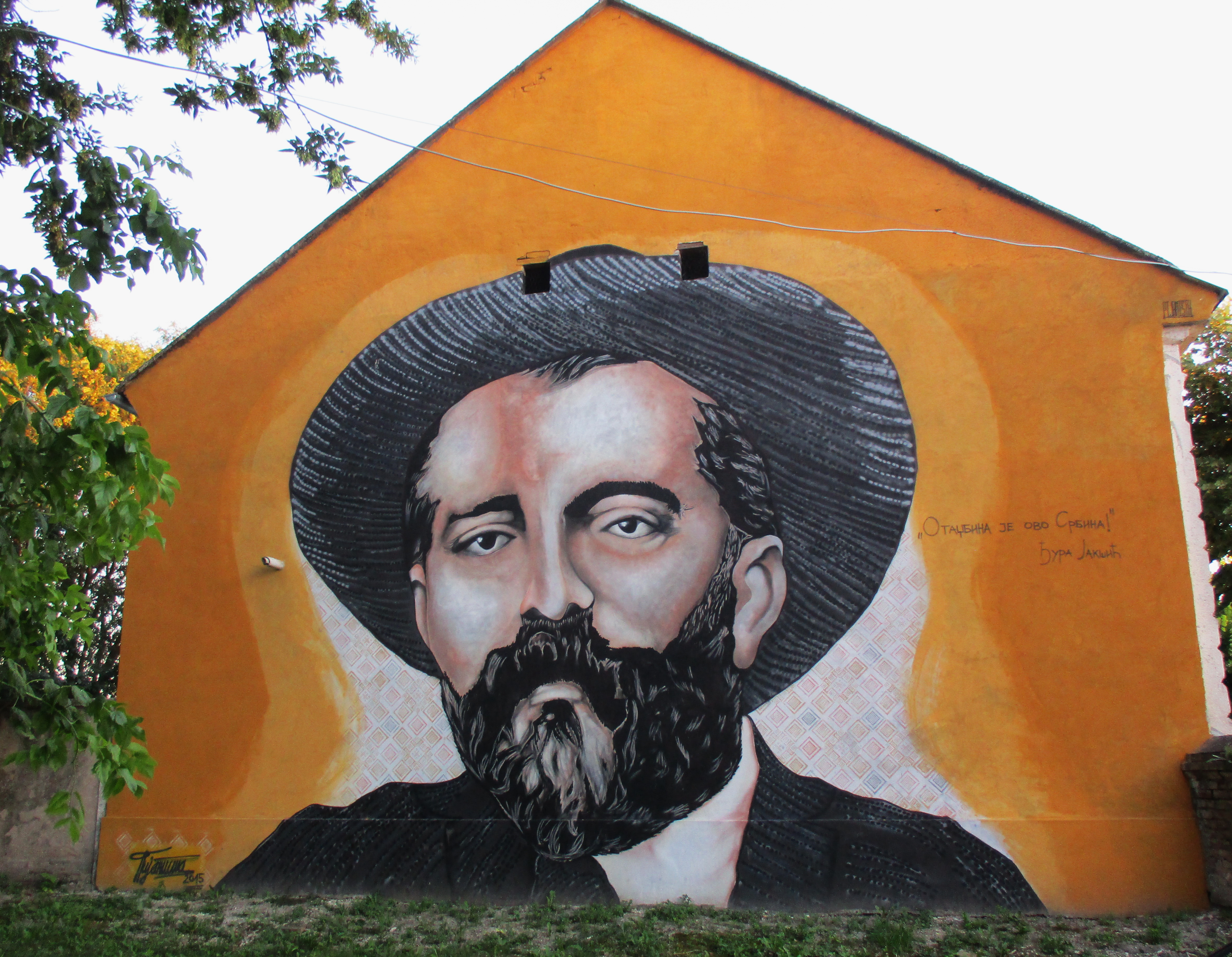
Mural of Đura Jakšić

== See also ==
- List of places in Serbia
- List of cities, towns and villages in Vojvodina
- Nova Crnja
