= Radojevo =

Radojevo Радојево (Serbian)
- Village (Selo)
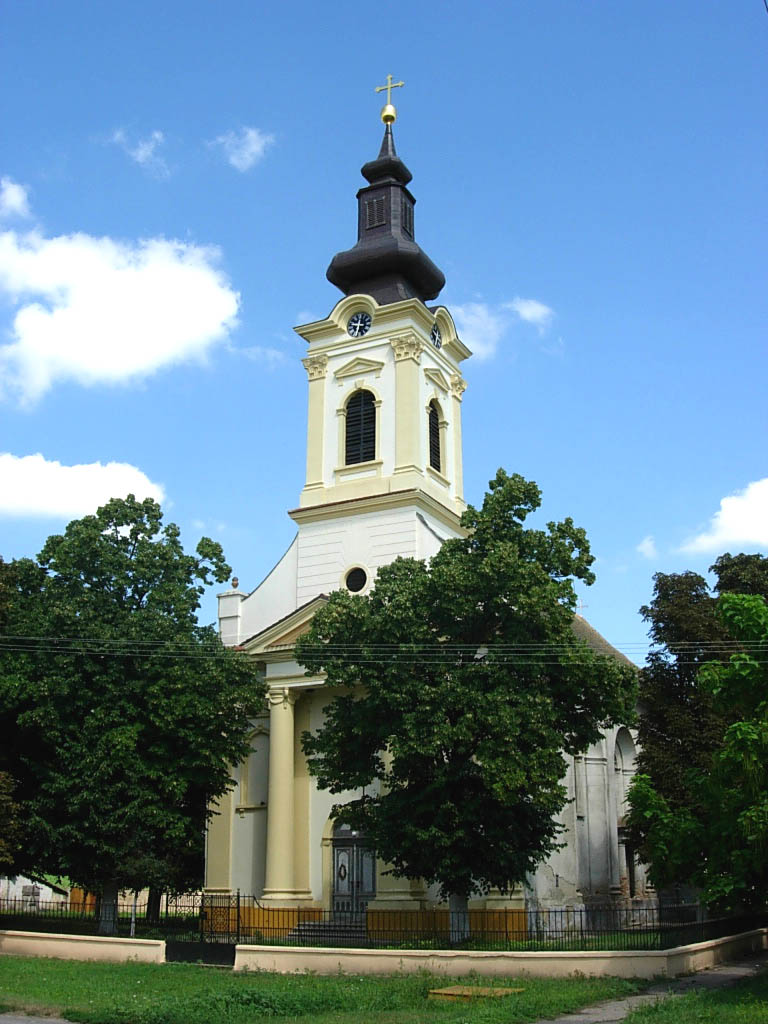
- The Orthodox Church

- Location of Toba within Serbia Radojevo (Serbia) Radojevo (Europe)
- Coordinates: 45°44′29″N 20°47′13″E
- Country: Serbia
- Province: Vojvodina
- District: Central Banat
- Municipalities: Nova Crnja
- Elevation: 65 m (213 ft)

Population (2002)
  - Radojevo: 1,385
- Time zone: UTC+1 (CET)
  - Summer (DST): UTC+2 (CEST)
- Postal code: 23221
- Area code: +381(0)23
- Car plates: ZR

Radojevo (Serbian Cyrillic: Радојево) is a village in Serbia. It is situated in the municipality of Nova Crnja, Central Banat District, Vojvodina province. The village has a Serb ethnic majority (78.98%) and its population is 1,385 people (2002 census).

== Name ==
In Serbian, the village is known as Radojevo or Радојево (formerly also Klarija / Кларија, Srpska Klarija / Српска Кларија or Peterda / Петерда), in Hungarian as Klári, in German as Klari, in Croatian as Radojevo or Hrvatska Klarija, and in Romanian as Peterda.

== History ==
Historically, the village was called Klarija, and before merging, there were two Klarija's: Srpska Klarija (Serb Klarija) and Hrvatska Klarija (Croat Klarija).

In Hungarian sources these were called Szerbklári and Horvátklári (located in 20° 47' 21" E and 45° 44' 48" N), respectively.
Hrvatska Klarija got its name after Croatian settlers (nobles that originated from Turopolje), that were settled there by the Diocese of Zagreb on its possessions (see Hrvatska Keča, Hrvatski Čenej). These Croats lived in compact part of the village; they have been slowly but evidently in large amounts assimilated. Still, this assimilation hasn't drawn the attention of Croat parties in Serbia.

The village changed its name after the WW2 and there is an initiative to give to the village its original name Srpska Klarija.

== Historical population ==
- 1900: 3,107
- 1931: 3,336
- 1961: 2,595
- 1971: 2,230
- 1981: 1,872
- 1991: 1,588

== Gallery ==
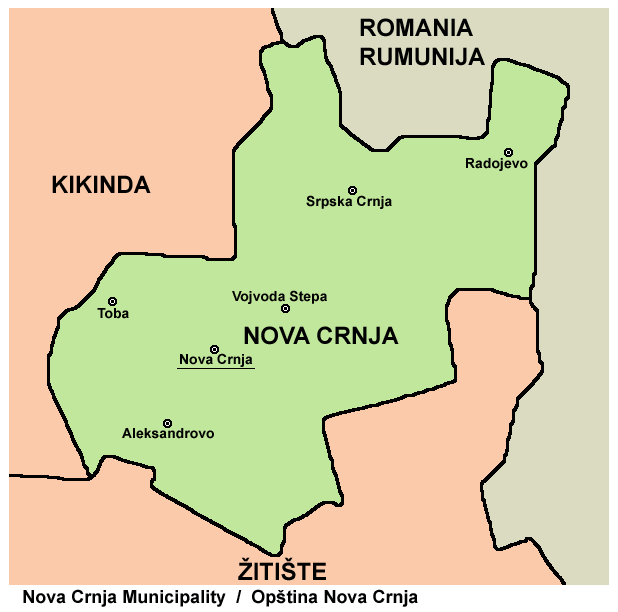
Map of the Nova Crnja municipality showing the location of Radojevo

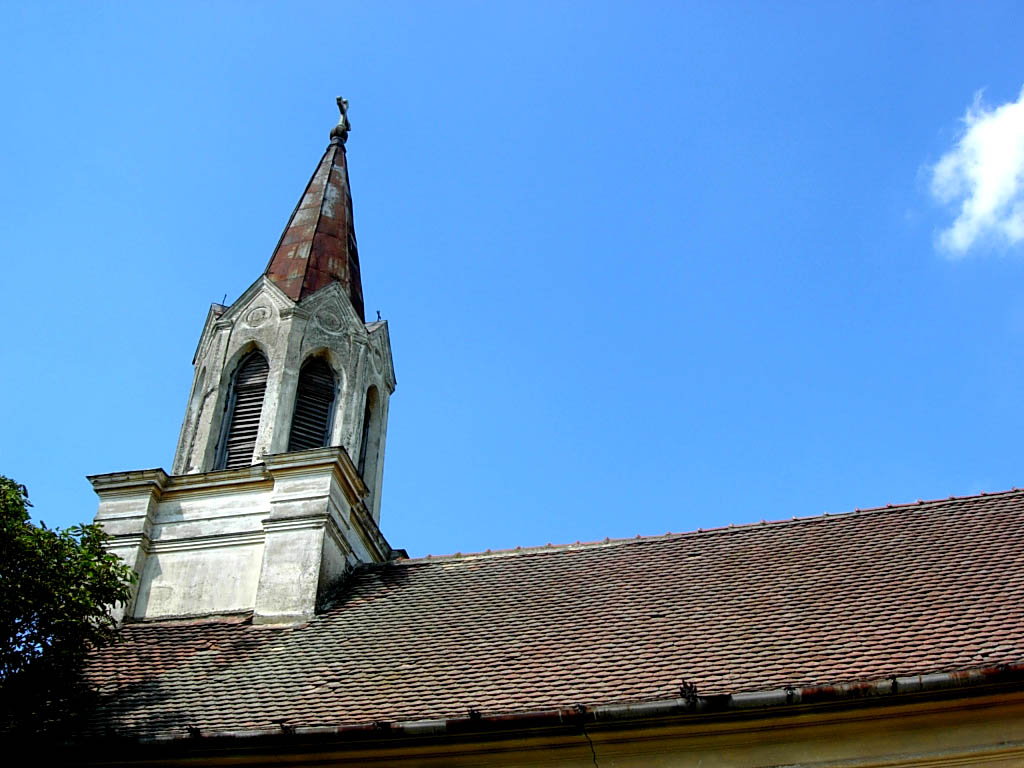
The Saint Urban Bishop and Martyr Catholic Church

== See also ==
- List of places in Serbia
- List of cities, towns and villages in Vojvodina
