= Vojvoda Stepa =

Vojvoda Stepa Војвода Степа (Serbian)
- Village (Selo)
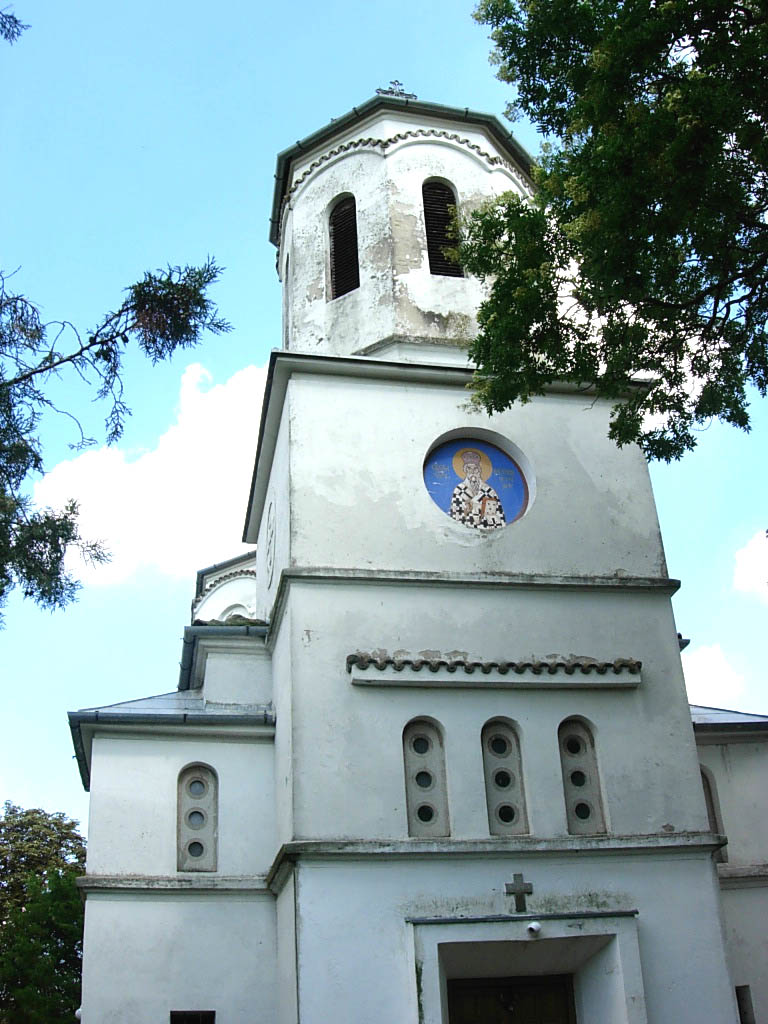
- The Orthodox Church

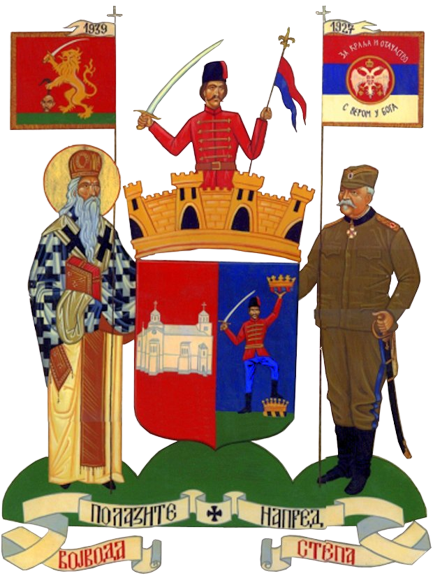
- Coat of arms

- Location of Toba within Serbia Vojvoda Stepa (Serbia) Vojvoda Stepa (Europe)
- Coordinates: 45°40′31″N 20°39′09″E
- Country: Serbia
- Province: Vojvodina
- District: Central Banat
- Municipalities: Nova Crnja
- Elevation: 70 m (230 ft)

Population (2011)
  - Vojvoda Stepa: 1,412
- Time zone: UTC+1 (CET)
  - Summer (DST): UTC+2 (CEST)
- Postal code: 23219
- Area code: +381(0)23
- Car plates: ZR

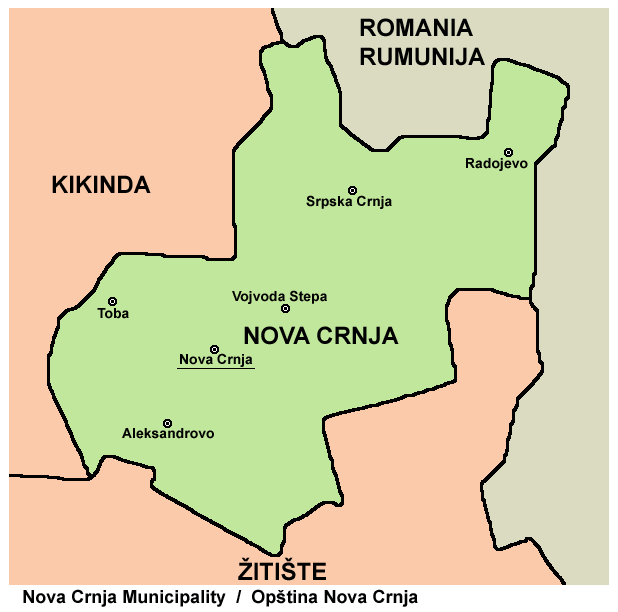
Map of Nova Crnja municipality, showing the location of Vojvoda Stepa

Vojvoda Stepa (Serbian Cyrillic: Војвода Степа) is a village in Serbia. It is situated in the Nova Crnja municipality, in the Central Banat District, Vojvodina province. The population of the village numbering 1,720 people (2002 census), of whom majority are ethnic Serbs.

== Name ==
In Serbian, the village is known as Vojvoda Stepa (Војвода Степа), and in Hungarian as Leónamajor. It is named after First World War in vojvoda Stepa Stepanović, one of four famous Dukes during the 1st World War, when couple of locals came to Čačak, when Duke was living and asked him for permission.

== History ==
The village was founded in 1923 and was settled by colonists who originated from various parts of the Kingdom of Serbs, Croats and Slovenes (Montenegro, Herzegovina, Lika, etc.). Many of the colonists were soldiers of the Serbian army, under the command of Vojvoda Stepa Stepanović, after whom the village gets its name. First name of the village was Leonovac (Леоновац), named after the daughter of Count Csekonics who had estate in the area where the village was founded.

== Ethnic groups (2002 census) ==
- Serbs = 1,584 (92.09%)
- Montenegrins = 41 (2.38%)
- Romani = 32 (1.86%)
- Yugoslavs = 12 (0.70%)
- Croats = 11 (0.64%)
- others.

== Historical population ==
- 1948: 2,832
- 1953: 3,076
- 1961: 2,857
- 1971: 2,518
- 1981: 2,032
- 1991: 1,827
- 2002: 1,720
- 2011: 1,412

== Culture ==
=== Coat of arms ===
The Coat of arms of Vojvoda Stepa was adopted on August 6, 2003. The Coat of arms was designed by Rade Pavlović and Nenad Jovanović. It depicts Basil of Ostrog holding the flag of Banat, and Stepa Stepanović holding a regimental flag of the Army of the Kingdom of Serbia.

== See also ==
- List of places in Serbia
- List of cities, towns and villages in Vojvodina
