= Aleksandrovo, Nova Crnja =

Aleksandrovo Александрово (Serbian)
- Village (Selo)
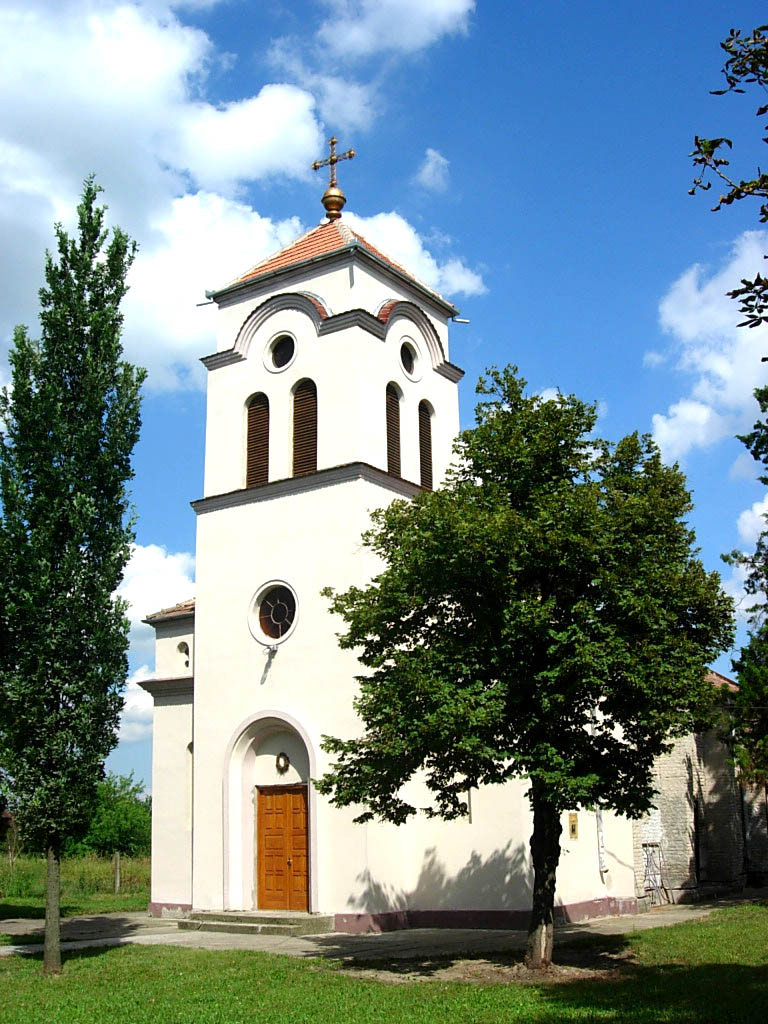
- The Orthodox Church

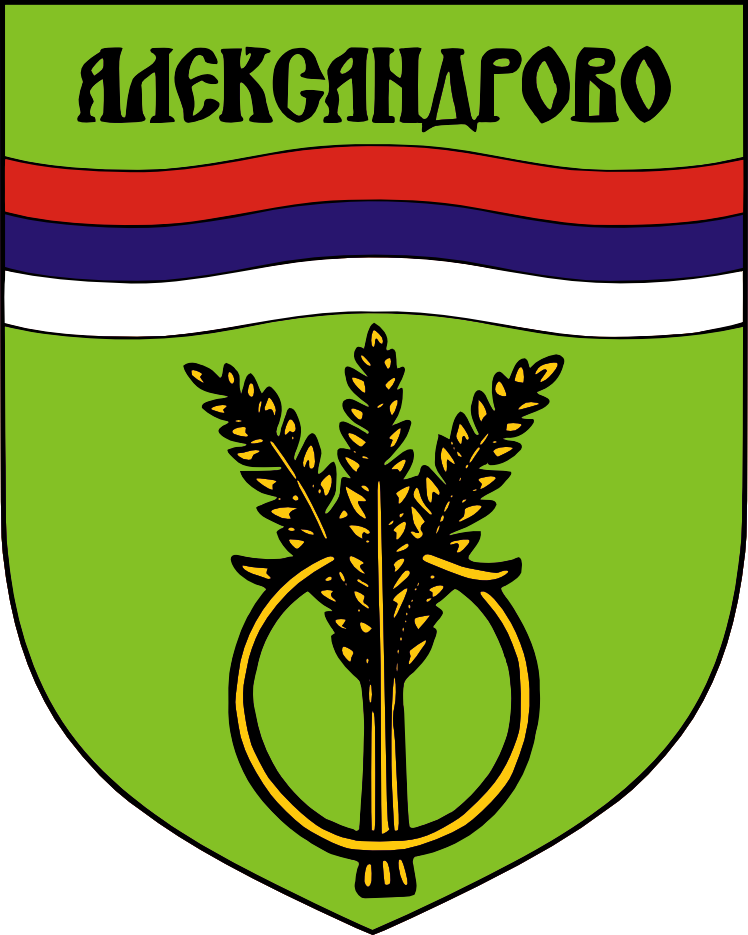
- Coat of arms

- Location of Toba within Serbia Aleksandrovo (Serbia) Aleksandrovo (Europe)
- Coordinates: 45°38′08″N 20°35′20″E
- Country: Serbia
- Province: Vojvodina
- District: Central Banat
- Municipalities: Nova Crnja
- Elevation: 65 m (213 ft)

Population (2002)
  - Aleksandrovo: 2,665
- Time zone: UTC+1 (CET)
  - Summer (DST): UTC+2 (CEST)
- Postal code: 23217
- Area code: +381(0)23
- Car plates: ZR

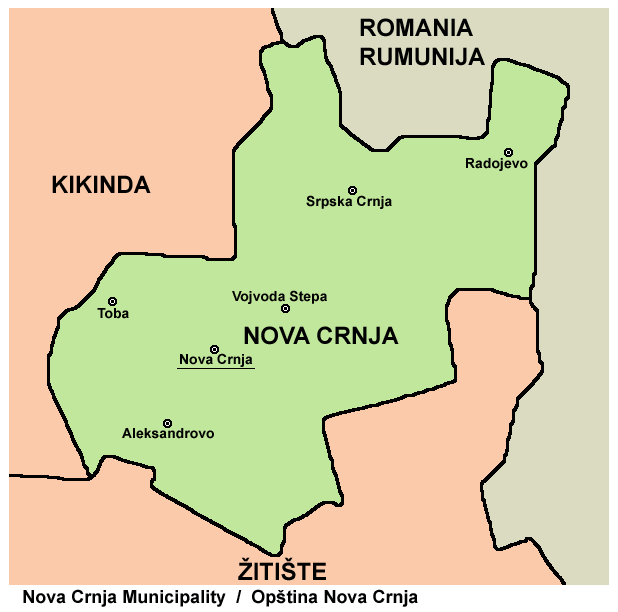
Map of the Nova Crnja municipality, showing the location of Aleksandrovo

Aleksandrovo (Serbian Cyrillic: Александрово), formerly known as Velike Livade (Serbian: Велике Ливаде), is a village in Serbia. It is situated in the Nova Crnja municipality, Central Banat District, Vojvodina province. The population of the village numbering 2,665 people (2002 census), of whom 2,435 (91.36%) are ethnic Serbs.

== Name ==
In Serbian, the village is known as Aleksandrovo or Александрово, in Hungarian as Bozítópuszta, and in Romanian as Livada Mare.

== Historical population ==
- 1961: 4,034
- 1971: 3,406
- 1981: 3,061
- 1991: 2,902

== See also ==
- List of places in Serbia
- List of cities, towns and villages in Vojvodina
