= Nova Crnja =

Nova Crnja Нова Црња (Serbian) Magyarcsernye (Hungarian)
- Village and municipality
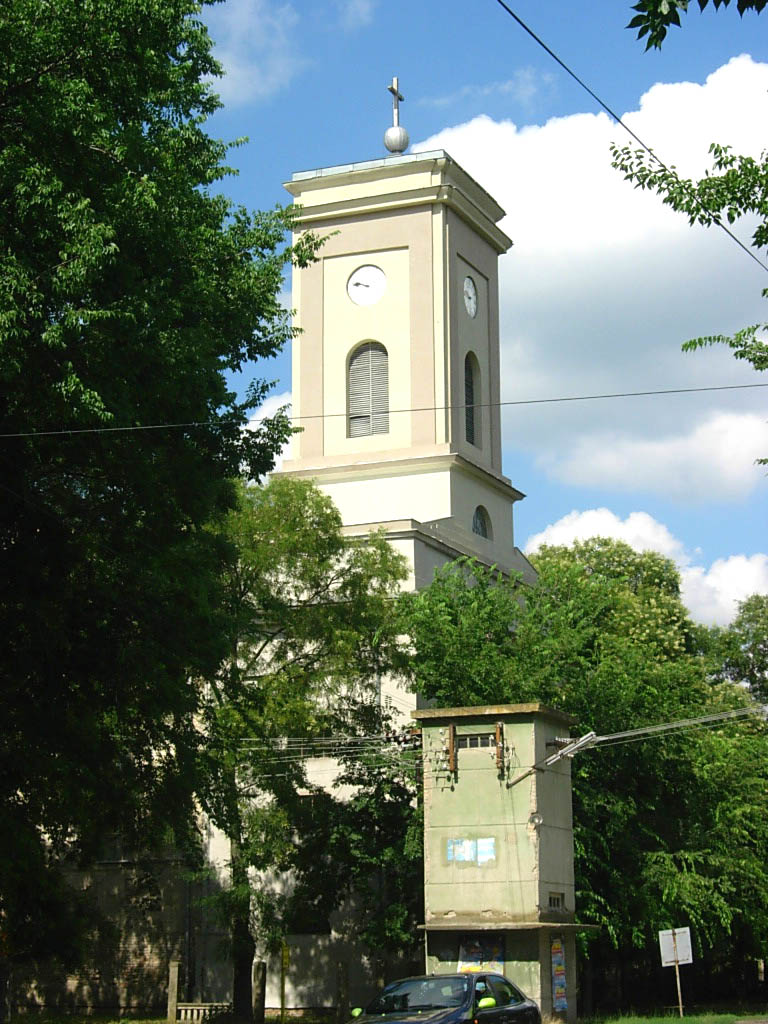
- The Saint Agatha Virgin and Martyr Catholic Church

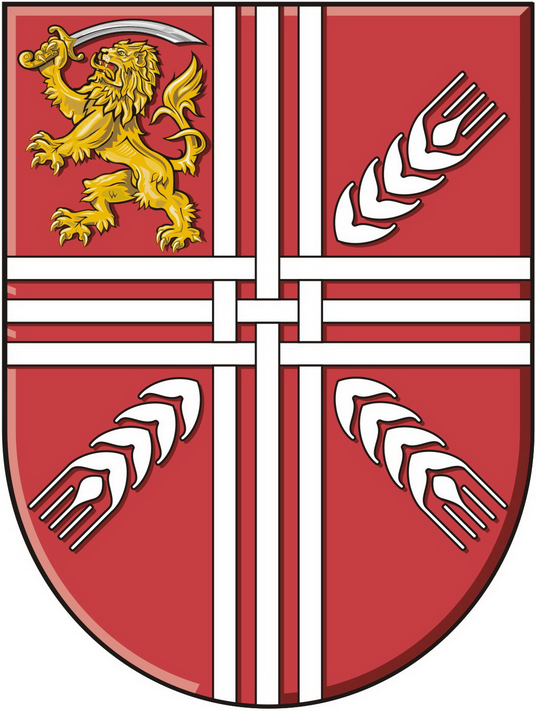
- Coat of arms

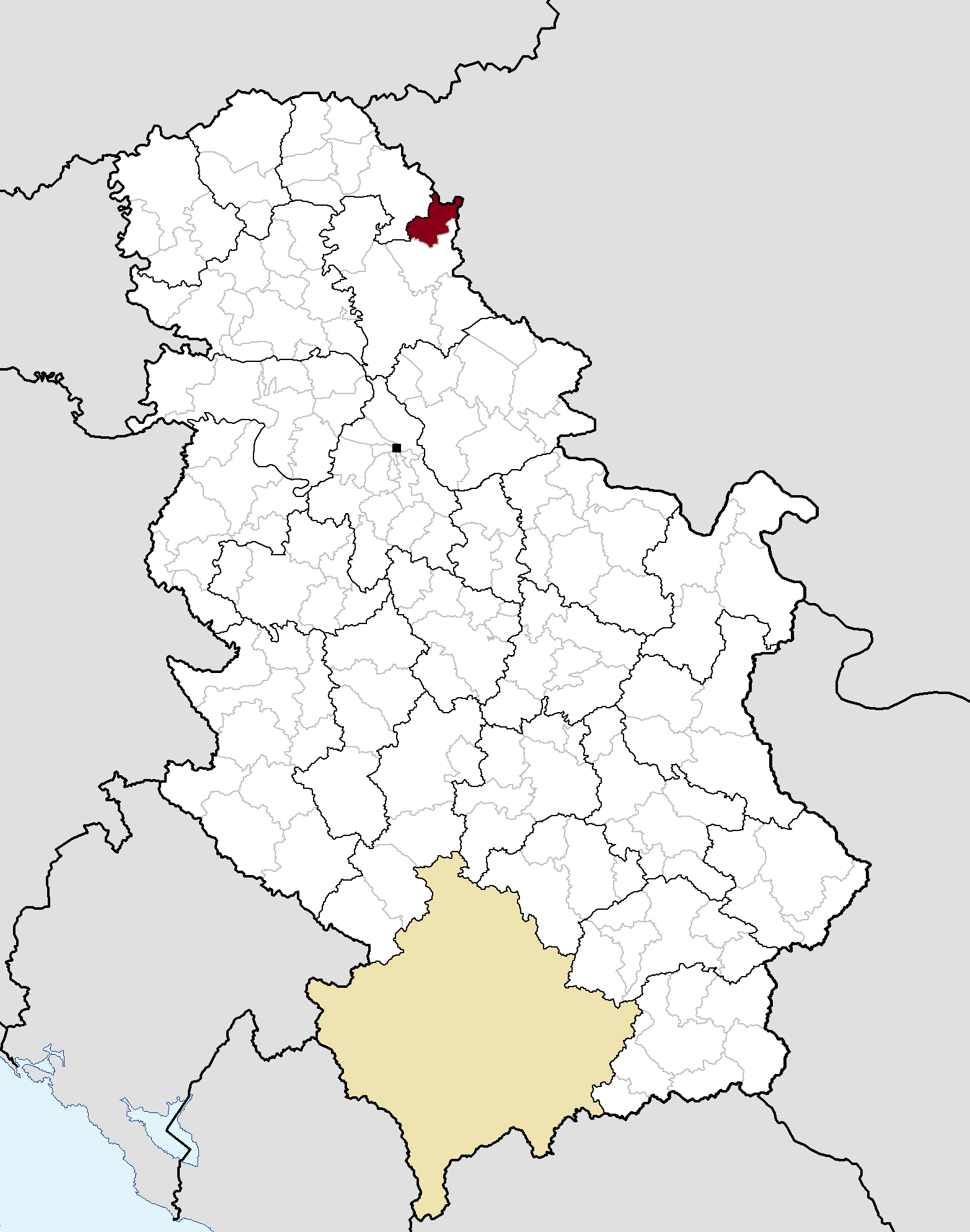
- Location of Nova Crnja within Serbia
- Coordinates: 45°40′N 20°36′E
- Country: Serbia
- Province: Vojvodina
- District: Central Banat

Government
  - President of municipality: Dragan Daničić (SNS)

Area
  - Total: 273 km^{2} (105.4 sq mi)
- Elevation: 77 m (253 ft)

Population (2022)
  - Total: 8,147
  - Administrative: 1,007
- Time zone: UTC+1 (CET)
  - Summer (DST): UTC+2 (CEST)
- Postal code: 23218
- Area code: +381(0)23
- Car plates: ZR
- Official languages: Serbian together with Hungarian
- Website: www.sonovacrnja.org.rs

Nova Crnja (Serbian Cyrillic: Нова Црња; Hungarian: Magyarcsernye, pronounced [ˈmɒɟɒrt͡ʃɛrɲɛ]; German: Neuzerne, Romanian: Cernea Ungurească) is a village and municipality located in the Central Banat District of the autonomous province of Vojvodina, Serbia. The village has a population of 1,007, while the municipality has 8,147 inhabitants (2022 census).

== Inhabited places ==
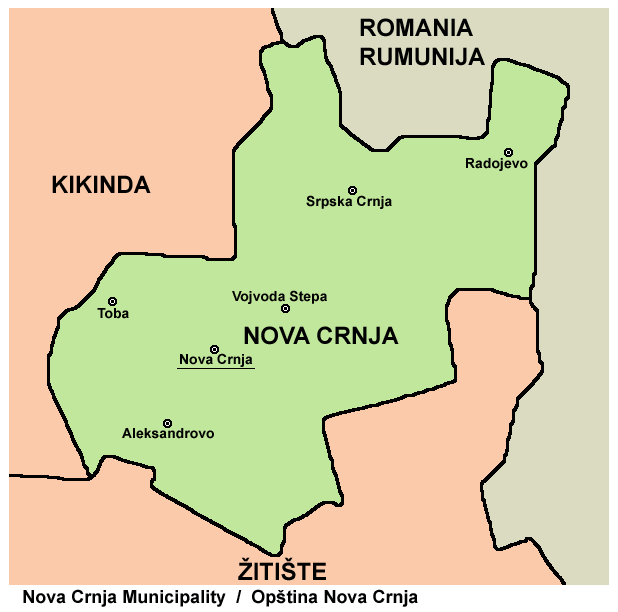
Map of Nova Crnja municipality

Nova Crnja municipality includes the following villages:

- Nova Crnja
- Aleksandrovo
- Vojvoda Stepa
- Radojevo
- Srpska Crnja
- Toba (Hungarian: Tóba)

Although the village of Nova Crnja is a seat of municipality, the largest of these villages is Srpska Crnja.

Before 1961, there was one more village in the municipality, which was abandoned because of groundwater. The name of the village was Molin.

== Demographics ==
Historical population
Year	Pop.	±% p.a.
1948	23,169	—
1953	23,382	+0.18%
1961	21,580	−1.00%
1971	18,298	−1.64%
1981	16,270	−1.17%
1991	14,538	−1.12%
2002	12,705	−1.22%
2011	10,272	−2.33%
2022	8,147	−2.08%

According to the 2011 census, the population of the municipality of Novi Crnja was 10,272 inhabitants.

=== Ethnic groups ===
Municipality

The population of the Nova Crnja municipality is composed of:

- Serbs (67.39%)
- Hungarians (17.71%)
- Romani (9.89%)
- Others and undeclared (5.01%)

Places with Serb ethnic majority are: Aleksandrovo, Vojvoda Stepa, Radojevo, and Srpska Crnja, while places with Hungarian ethnic majority are: Nova Crnja (Hungarian: Magyarcsernye) and Toba (Hungarian: Tóba).

Village

The population of the Nova Crnja village is composed of:

- Hungarians (84.58%)
- Serbs (6.02%)
- Others.

== Twin cities ==
- Nagyszénás, Hungary
- Jimbolia, Romania

== See also ==
- List of places in Serbia
- List of cities, towns and villages in Vojvodina
- Central Banat District
