= Administrative districts of Serbia =

Administrative districts Управни окрузи Upravni okruzi
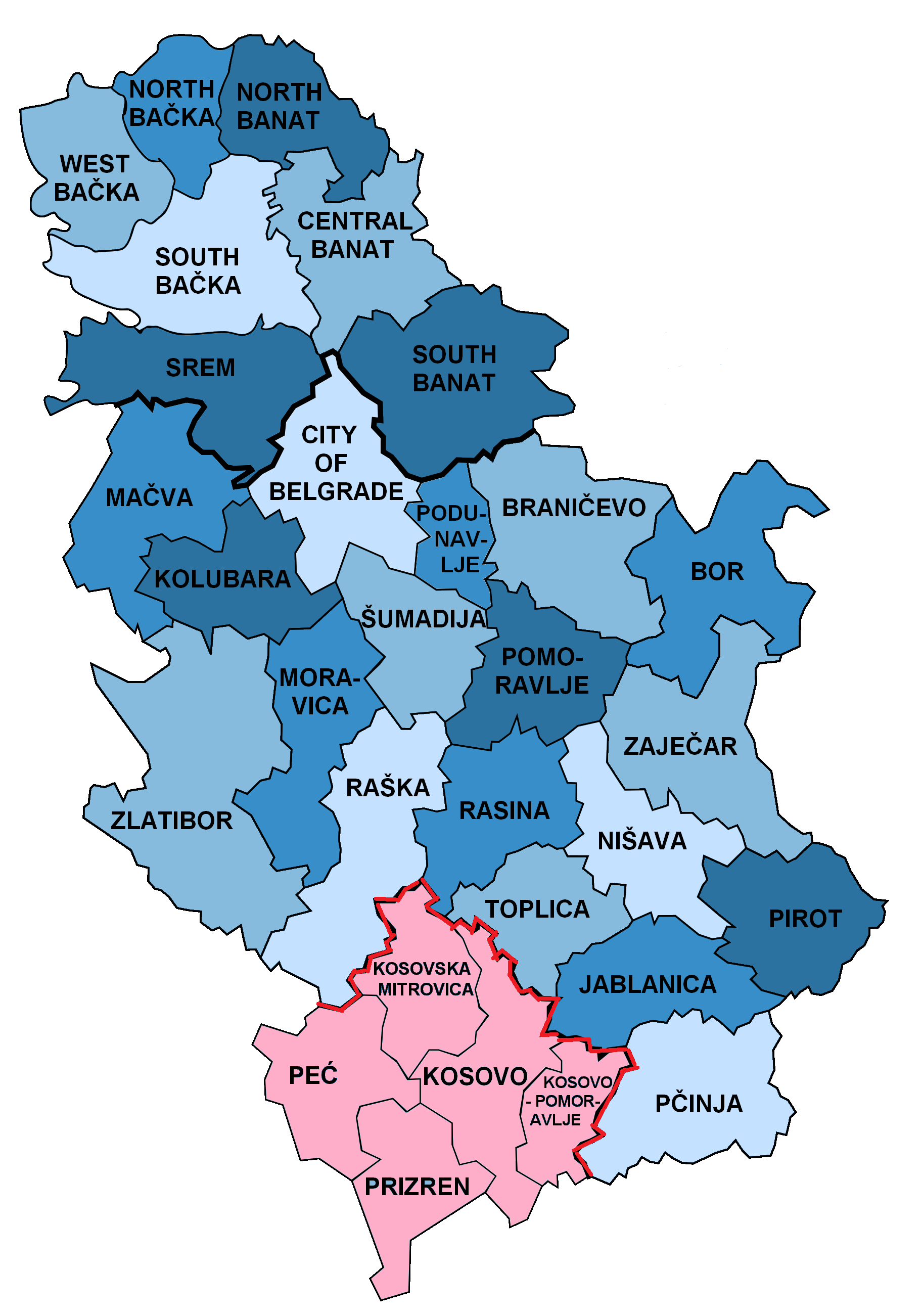
- Category: Unitary state
- Location: Serbia
- Created: 1992
- Number: 24 (29 including Kosovo)
- Populations: 77,341 (Toplica) – 607,178 (South Bačka)
- Areas: 1,248 km^{2} (482 sq mi) (Podunavlje) – 6,140 km^{2} (2,370 sq mi) (Zlatibor)

The administrative districts (Serbian: управни окрузи, romanized: upravni okruzi) of Serbia are deconcentrated coordination units of the central government, established under the 2005 Law on State Administration and implemented through government decrees. They are not administrative divisions, as the administrative divisions of Serbia are constitutionally defined units of self-governance or autonomy, but rather regional operational centers serving ministerial field offices (such as branches of inspection authorities). Each has a territorial remit matching a certain cluster of municipalities and cities (which are constitutionally and statutorily defined administrative divisions).

Originally instituted by a 1992 government decree, there are 29 administrative districts, with the City of Belgrade having similar status. Following the 2008 Kosovo declaration of independence, the districts created by the UNMIK-Administration were adopted by Kosovo. The Serbian government does not recognize these districts.

Territorially, an administrative district is merely a designation of the territorial remit of a given regional centre of state administration, through which the central government exercises its power within a hierarchical structure. In practical and organizational terms, administrative districts are often small field offices coordinating deconcentrated state functions with no independent decision-making authority. Each is headed by a government-appointed functionary-level official titled Head of the Administrative District.

The administrative districts are generally named after historical and geographical regions, though some, such as the Pčinja District and the Nišava District, are named after local rivers. Their areas and populations vary, ranging from the relatively-small Podunavlje District to the much larger Zlatibor District. The term okrug (pl. okruzi) means "circuit" and corresponds (in literal meaning) to bezirk in the German language. Prior to a 2006 decree, the administrative districts were named simply districts.

== Definition ==
Administrative districts were first defined by the decree of the Government of Serbia on 29 January 1992, which specified that ministries and other national-level agencies shall conduct their affairs outside their headquarters (i.e. outside the seat of government) via regional offices that they may establish per the designated clusters of municipalities (named only "districts"), also designating the administrative seat of each district ("regional centre of state administration"). The 2005 Law on Public Administration provided a legal definition of a district, under the term "administrative district".

An administrative district shall be established for the execution of state administration tasks outside the headquarters of the state administration authority.
...
The Government shall establish administrative districts by its regulation, by which it shall also determine areas and seats of administrative districts.

In 2006, the Government enacted the Decree on Administrative Districts, which renamed the districts into administrative districts.

The territorial organisation of Serbia is regulated by the Law on Territorial Organisation, adopted by the National Assembly on 29 December 2007. According to the Law, the territorial organisation of Serbia comprises municipalities and cities, the City of Belgrade with special status, and autonomous provinces. Not subject to this law, or even mentioned in it, administrative districts are not territorial organization units. Serbia's territory is not politically subdivided into them, and rather than being further divisible into municipalities, each overlaps with its corresponding cluster of municipalities. As such, administrative districts are not articulations of local governance or autonomy and are purely a mechanism of deconcentration (the weakest form of decentralization), remaining dependent on the central executive branch.

As extensions of the central government that lack standalone institutional personality, administrative districts do not possess flags or coats of arms.

== List of districts ==
Under the Law on Public Administration, administrative districts are formed by the Government by its Decree on Administrative Districts, which also determines the territory and head office of each administrative district. There are 29 administrative districts in the Republic of Serbia.

District	Seat	Area in km^{2}	Population	Population per km^{2}	Municipalities and cities	Settlements
Bor District (Borski okrug)	Bor	3,507	101,100	28.8	City of Bor; Kladovo; Majdanpek; Negotin	90
Braničevo District (Braničevski okrug)	Požarevac	3,865	156,367	40.5	City of Požarevac; Golubac; Kučevo; Malo Crniće; Petrovac; Veliko Gradište; Žabari; Žagubica	189
Central Banat District (Srednjobanatski okrug)	Zrenjanin	3,256	157,711	48.4	City of Zrenjanin; Novi Bečej; Nova Crnja; Sečanj; Žitište	55
Jablanica District (Jablanički okrug)	Leskovac	2,769	184,502	66.6	City of Leskovac; Bojnik; Crna Trava; Lebane; Medveđa; Vlasotince	336
Kolubara District (Kolubarski okrug)	Valjevo	2,474	154,497	62.4	City of Valjevo; Lajkovac; Ljig; Mionica; Osečina; Ub	218
Mačva District (Mačvanski okrug)	Šabac	3,268	265,377	81.2	Bogatić; City of Šabac; City of Loznica; Vladimirci; Koceljeva; Krupanj; Ljubovija; Mali Zvornik	228
Moravica District (Moravički okrug)	Čačak	3,016	189,281	62.8	City of Čačak; Gornji Milanovac; Ivanjica; Lučani	206
Nišava District (Nišavski okrug)	Niš	2,729	343,950	126.0	City of Niš; Aleksinac; Doljevac; Gadžin Han; Merošina; Ražanj; Svrljig	285
North Bačka District (Severnobački okrug)	Subotica	1,784	160,163	89.8	City of Subotica; Bačka Topola; Mali Iđoš	45
North Banat District (Severnobanatski okrug)	Kikinda	2,329	117,896	50.6	City of Kikinda; Ada; Čoka; Kanjiža; Novi Kneževac; Senta	50
Pčinja District (Pčinjski okrug)	Vranje	3,520	193,802	55.1	City of Vranje; Bosilegrad; Bujanovac; Preševo; Surdulica; Trgovište; Vladičin Han	363
Pirot District (Pirotski okrug)	Pirot	2,761	76,700	27.8	City of Pirot; Babušnica; Bela Palanka; Dimitrovgrad	214
Podunavlje District (Podunavski okrug)	Smederevo	1,248	175,573	140.7	City of Smederevo; Smederevska Palanka; Velika Plana	58
Pomoravlje District (Pomoravski okrug)	Jagodina	2,614	182,047	69.6	City of Jagodina; Ćuprija; Despotovac; Paraćin; Rekovac; Svilajnac	191
Rasina District (Rasinski okrug)	Kruševac	2,667	207,197	77.7	City of Kruševac; Aleksandrovac; Brus; Ćićevac; Trstenik; Varvarin	296
Raška District (Raški okrug)	Kraljevo	3,918	296,532	75.7	City of Kraljevo; City of Novi Pazar; Raška; Tutin; Vrnjačka Banja	359
South Bačka District (Južnobački okrug)	Novi Sad	4,016	607,178	151.2	City of Novi Sad; Bač; Bačka Palanka; Bački Petrovac; Bečej; Beočin; Srbobran; Sremski Karlovci; Temerin; Titel; Vrbas; Žabalj	77
South Banat District (Južnobanatski okrug)	Pančevo	4,245	260,244	61.3	City of Pančevo; City of Vršac; Alibunar; Bela Crkva; Kovin; Kovačica; Opovo; Plandište	94
Srem District (Sremski okrug)	Sremska Mitrovica	3,486	282,547	81.1	City of Sremska Mitrovica; Inđija; Irig; Pećinci; Ruma; Stara Pazova; Šid	109
Šumadija District (Šumadijski okrug)	Kragujevac	2,387	269,728	113.0	City of Kragujevac; Aranđelovac; Batočina; Knić; Lapovo; Rača; Topola	174
Toplica District (Toplički okrug)	Prokuplje	2,231	77,341	34.7	City of Prokuplje; Blace; Kuršumlija; Žitorađa	267
West Bačka District (Zapadnobački okrug)	Sombor	2,420	154,491	63.8	City of Sombor; Apatin; Kula; Odžaci	37
Zaječar District (Zaječarski okrug)	Zaječar	3,623	96,715	26.7	City of Zaječar; Boljevac; Knjaževac; Sokobanja	173
Zlatibor District (Zlatiborski okrug)	Užice	6,140	254,659	41.5	City of Užice; Arilje; Bajina Bašta; Čajetina; Kosjerić; Nova Varoš; Požega; Priboj; Prijepolje; Sjenica	438
Kosovo District (Note: Even though the Republic of Kosovo, as of February 17th 2008, has been an independent country, Serbian laws treat Kosovo as integral part of Serbia as the Autonomous Province of Kosovo and Metohija. The 1992 Decree defines five districts on the territory of Kosovo. But, from 1999, following the Kosovo War, Kosovo was governed under the United Nations' administration of UNMIK. In 2000, the UNMIK administration changed the territorial organisation on the territory of Kosovo. All five districts were abolished, and seven new districts were created, which were later adopted by Kosovo after the 2008 declaration of Independence. The Serbian government does not recognize this move, and claims the pre-2000 five districts) (Kosovski okrug)	Priština	3,310	570,835	172.5	Glogovac; Kačanik; Kosovo Polje; Lipljan; Obilić; Podujevo; Priština; Štimlje; Štrpce; Uroševac	393
Kosovo-Pomoravlje District (Kosovsko-pomoravski okrug)	Gnjilane	1,389	184,864	133.1	Gnjilane; Kosovska Kamenica; Novo Brdo; Vitina	184
Kosovska Mitrovica District (Kosovsko-mitrovački okrug)	Kosovska Mitrovica	2,053	234,262	114.1	Kosovska Mitrovica; Leposavić; Srbica; Vučitrn; Zubin Potok; Zvečan	335
Peć District (Pećki okrug)	Peć	2,459	351,680	143.2	Dečani; Đakovica; Istok; Klina; Peć	317
Prizren District (Prizrenski okrug)	Prizren	2,196	319,330	145.4	Gora; Orahovac; Prizren; Suva Reka	220

== See also ==
- ISO 3166-2:RS

== Sources ==
- Balinovac, Zoran M.; Damjanović, Jasmina (2006). Miklič, Peter (ed.). The government and state administration system in the Republic of Serbia – compilation of laws and explanatory articles (PDF). Translated by Čavoški, Aleksandra; Vuruna, Dejan. Belgrade: Dial, Grafolik. ISBN 86-902823-3-5. Archived from the original (PDF) on 2019-04-28.
- "Uredba o Upravnim okruzima" (PDF). Službeni glasnik Republike Srbije/Sl. Glasnik RS. 15. 2006. Archived from the original (PDF) on 2010-11-05.
