= Central Banat District =

Administrative district of Serbia

Central Banat District Средњoбанатски округ
- Administrative district of Serbia
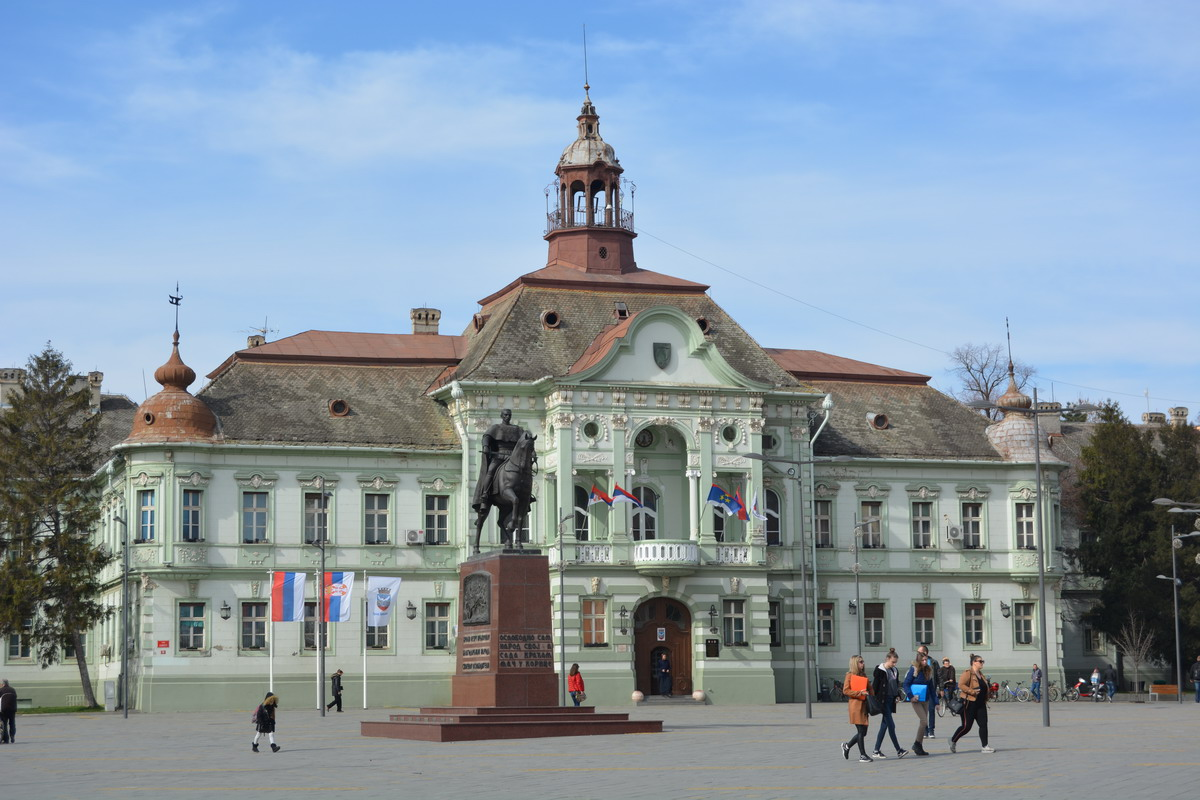
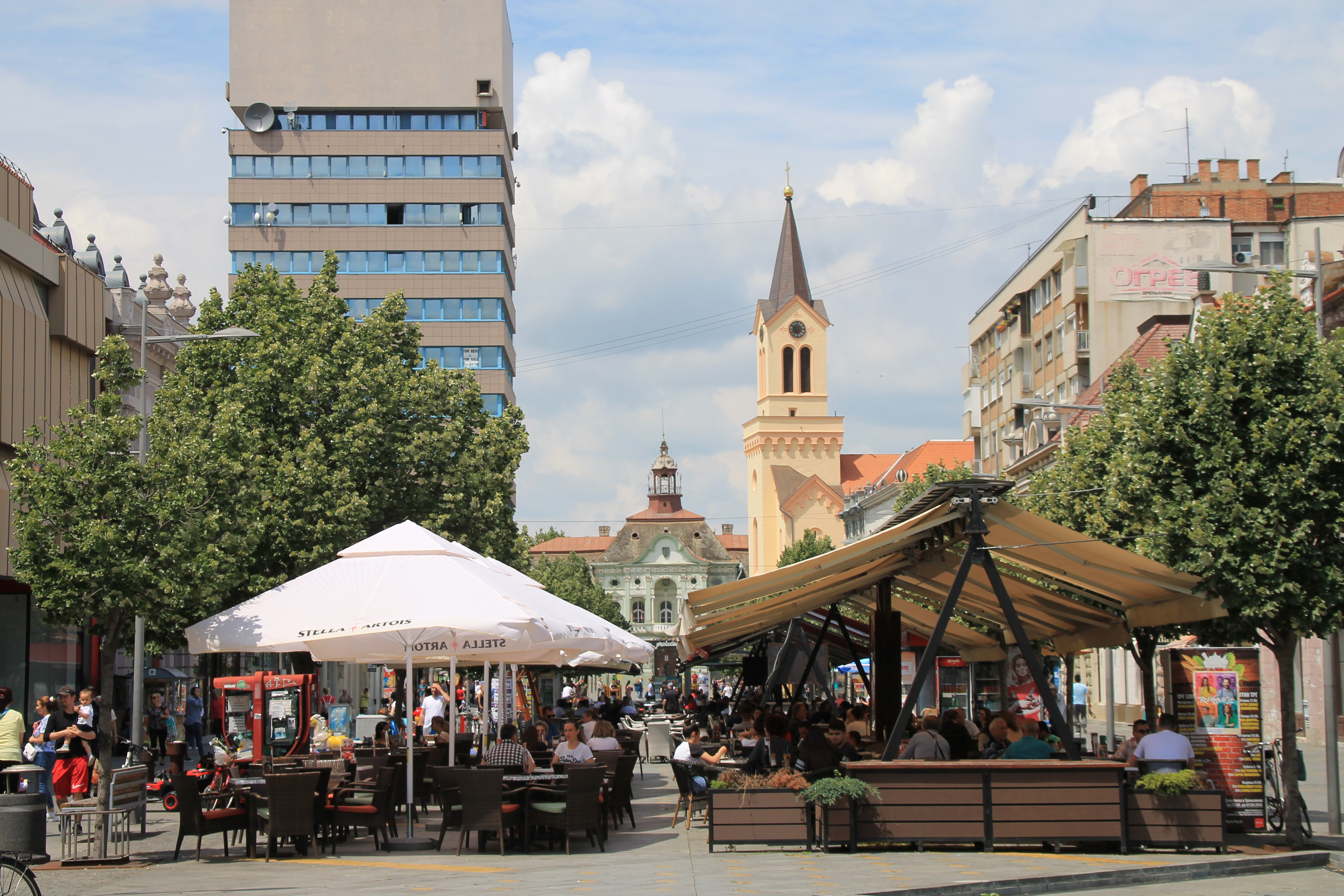
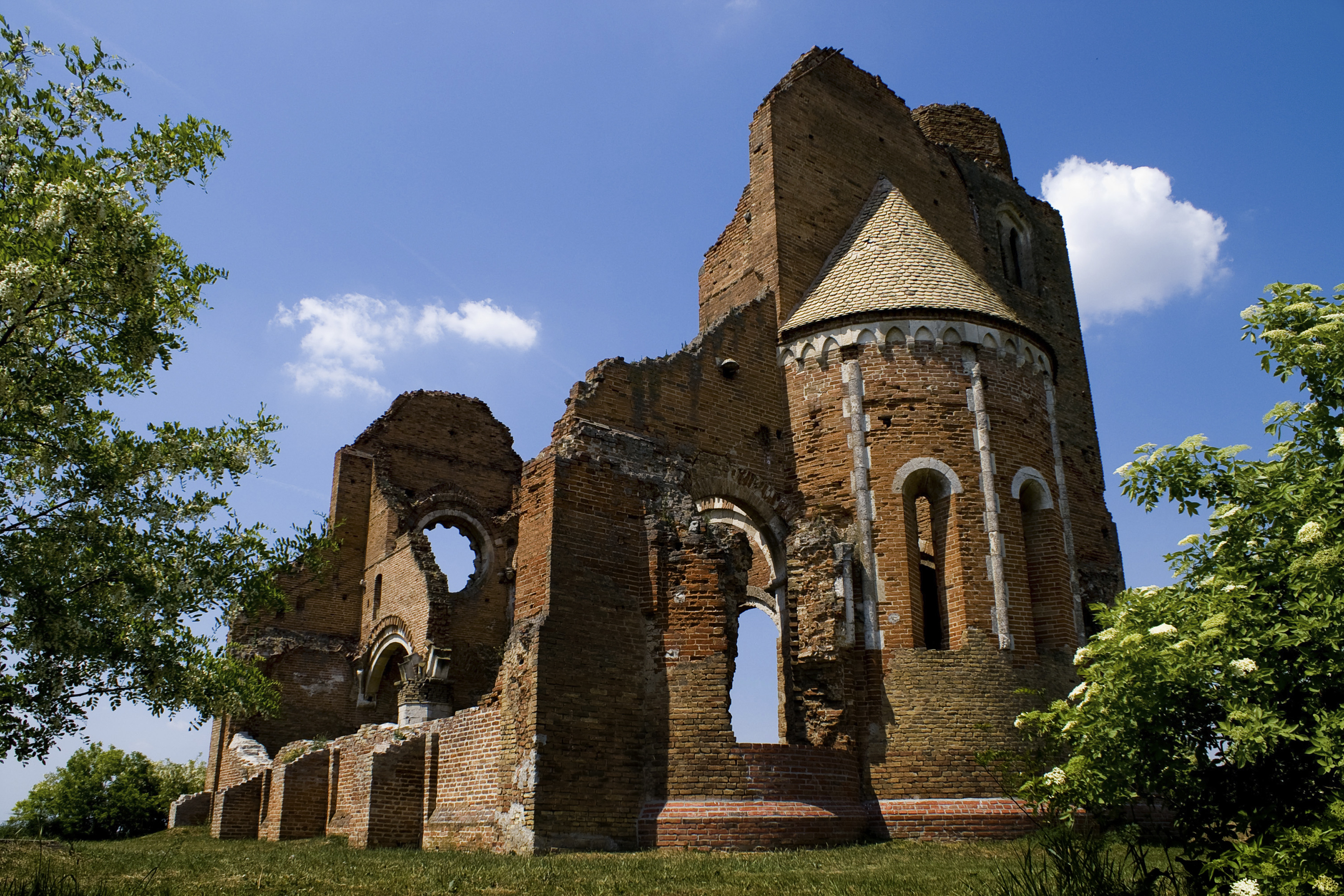
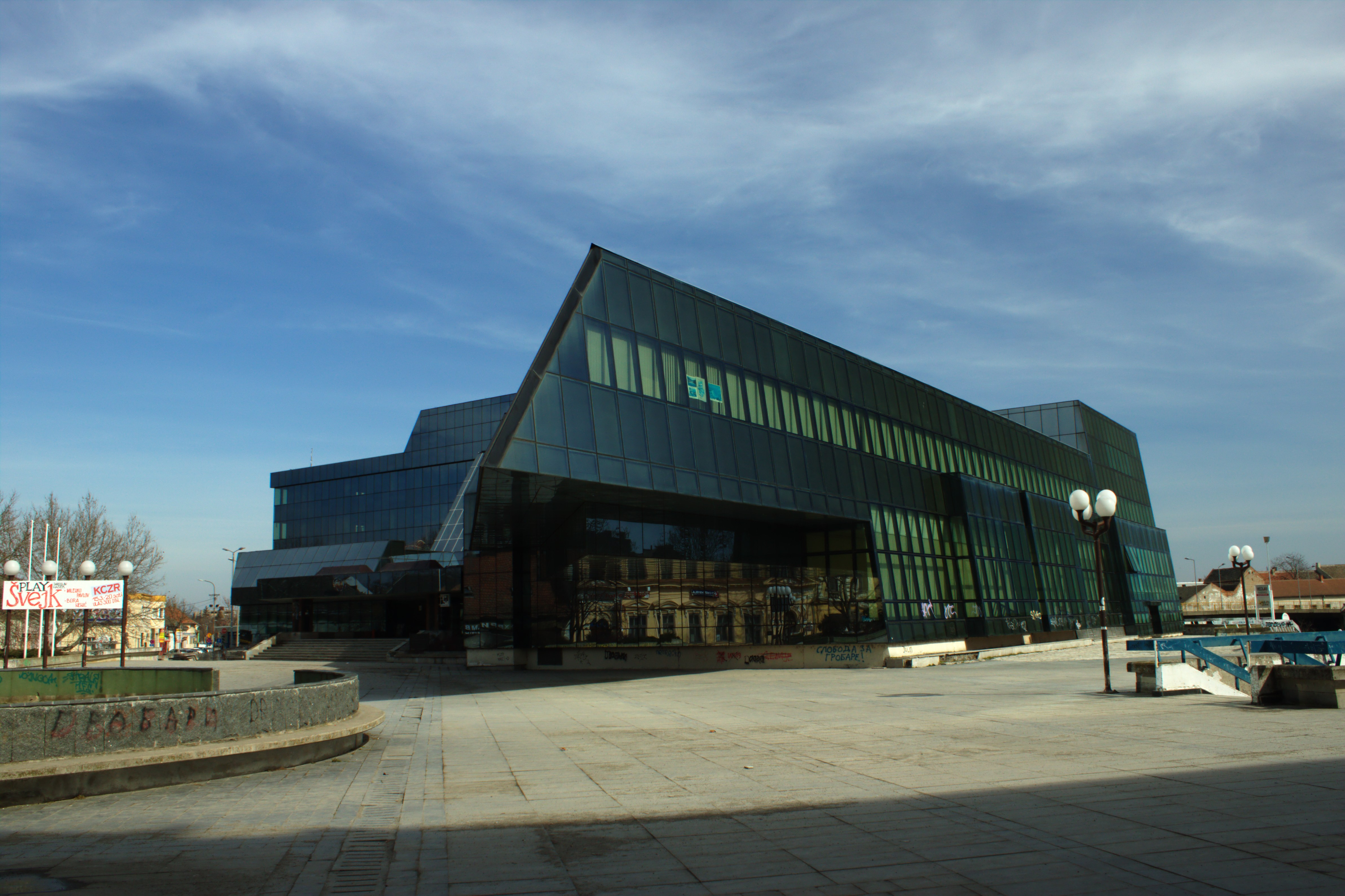
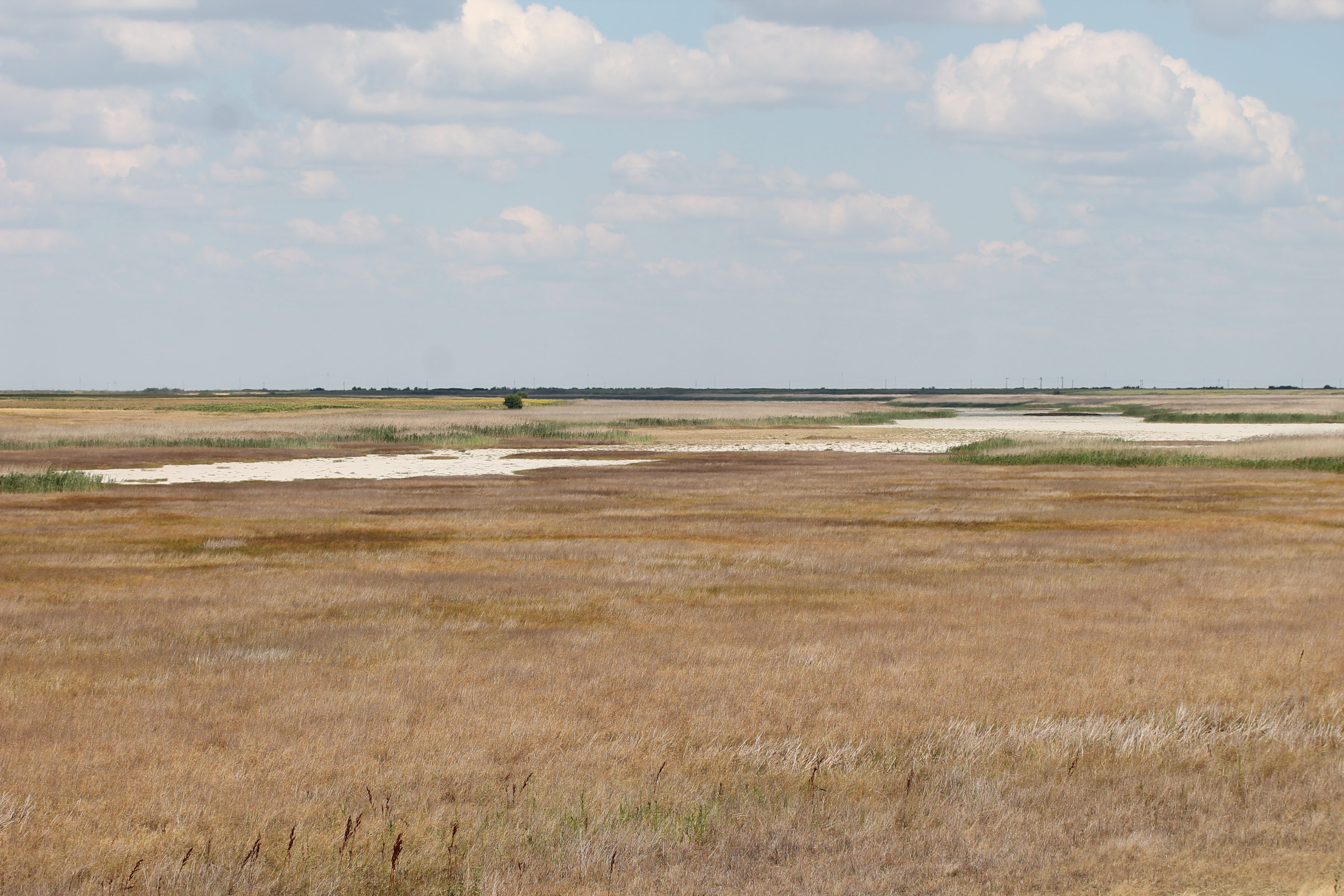
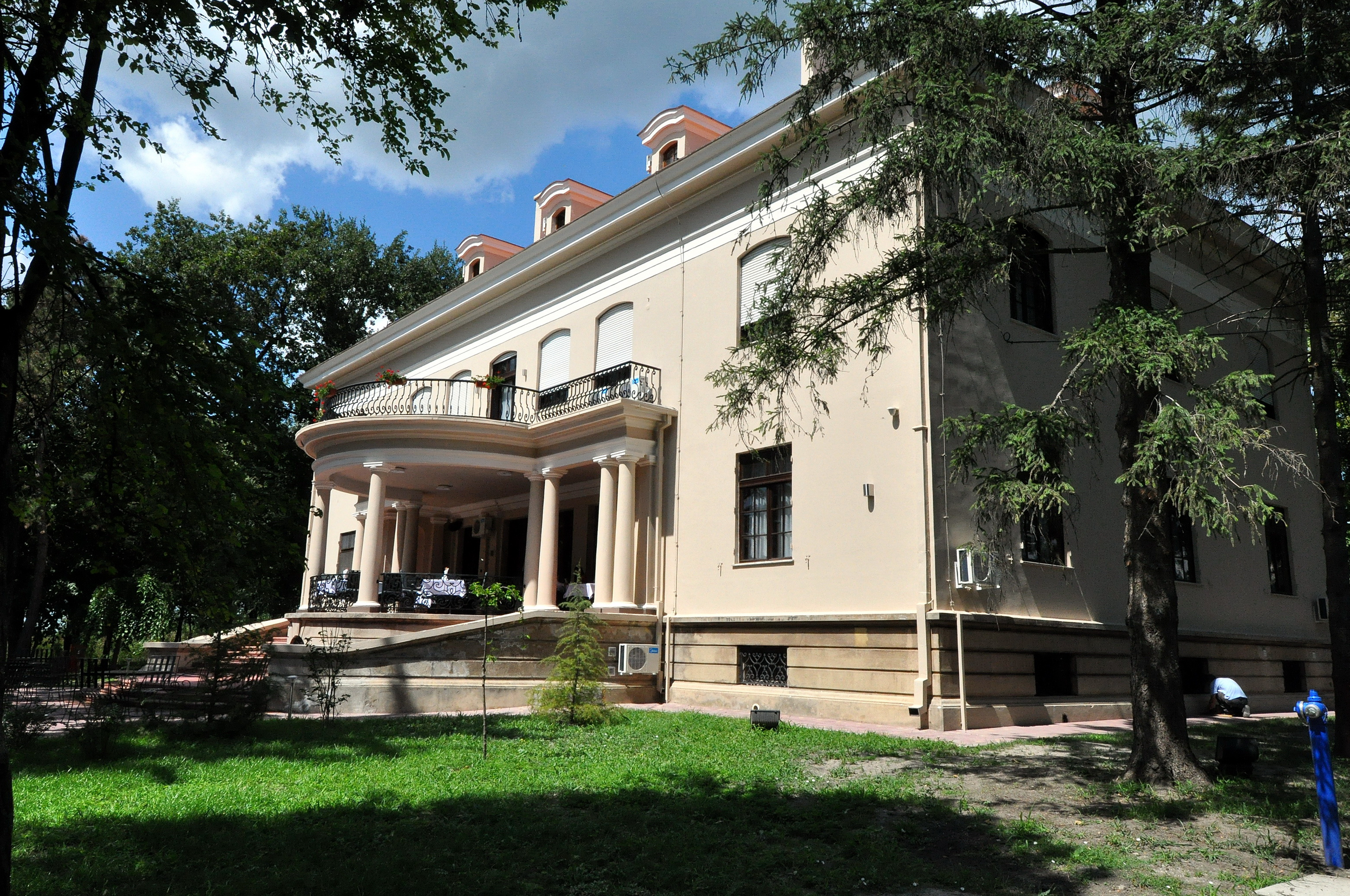
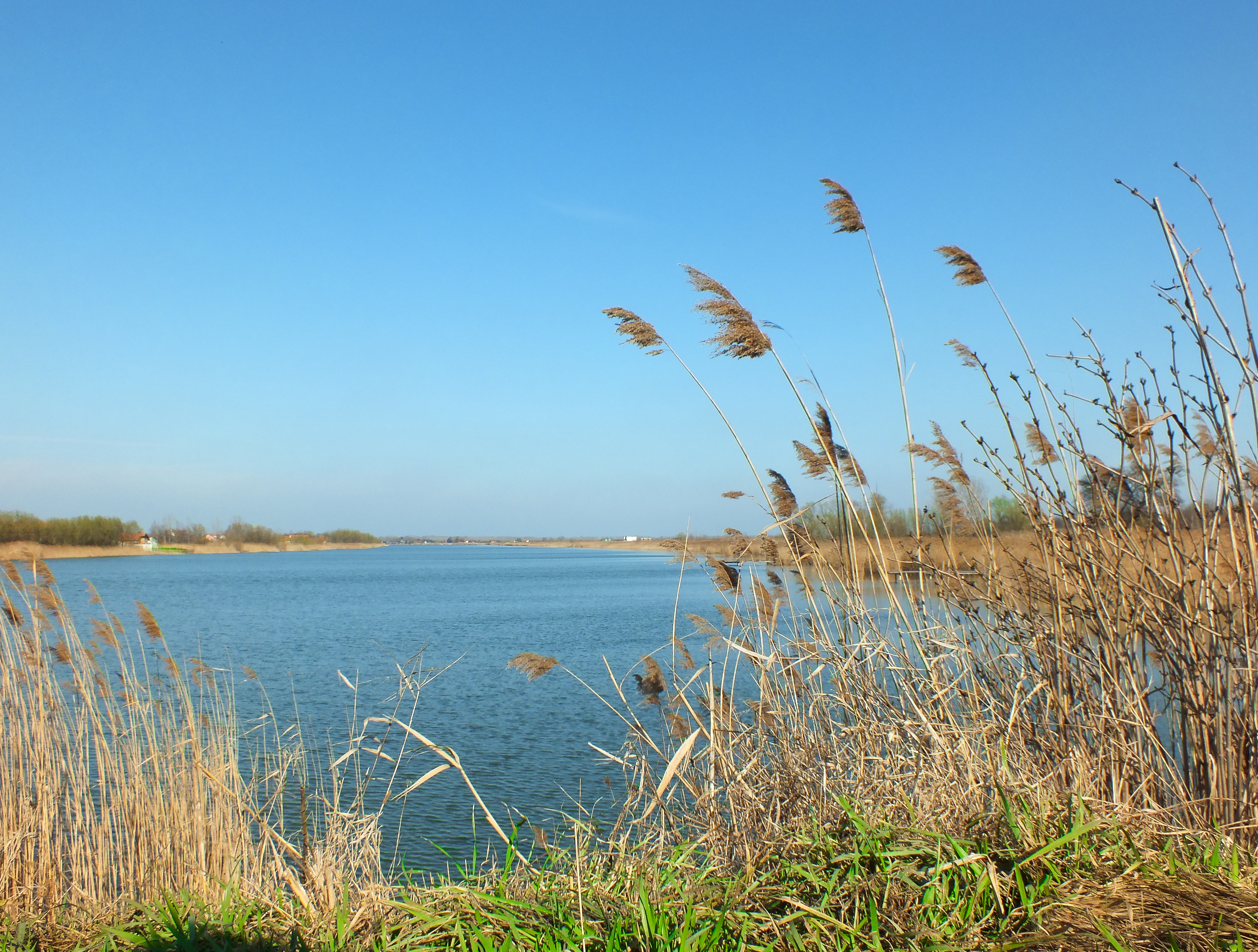
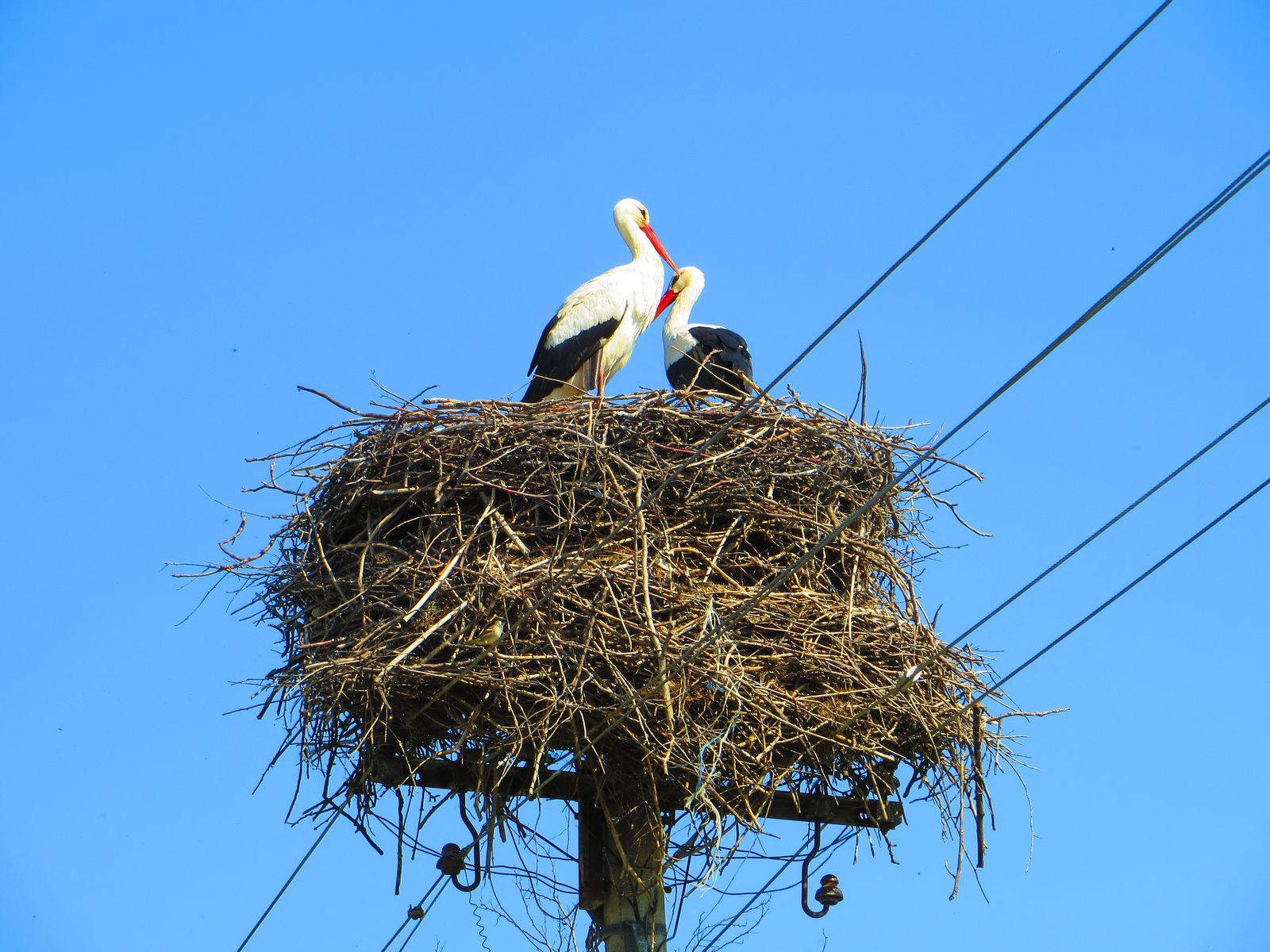
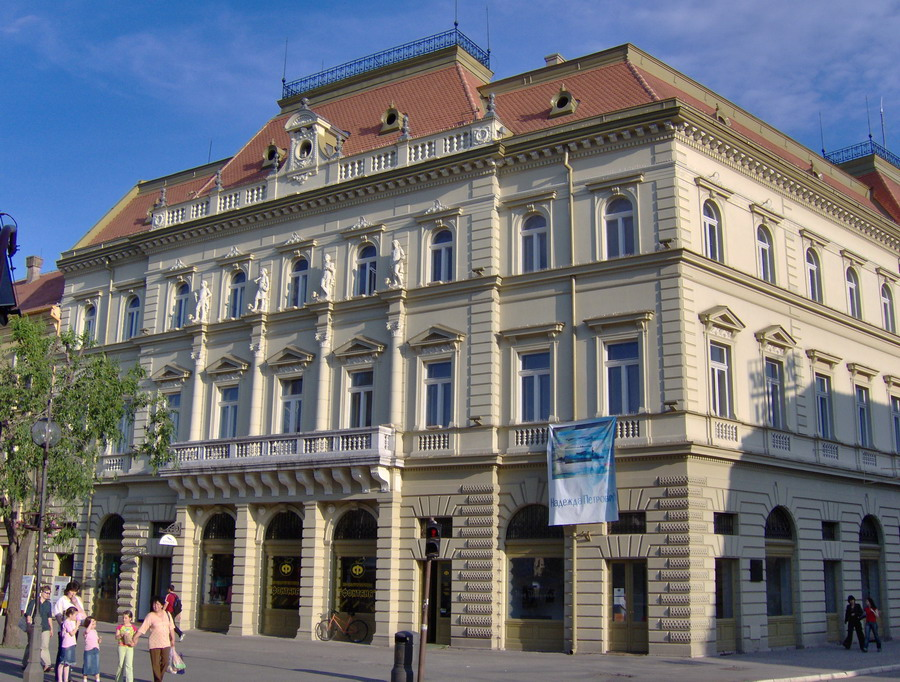
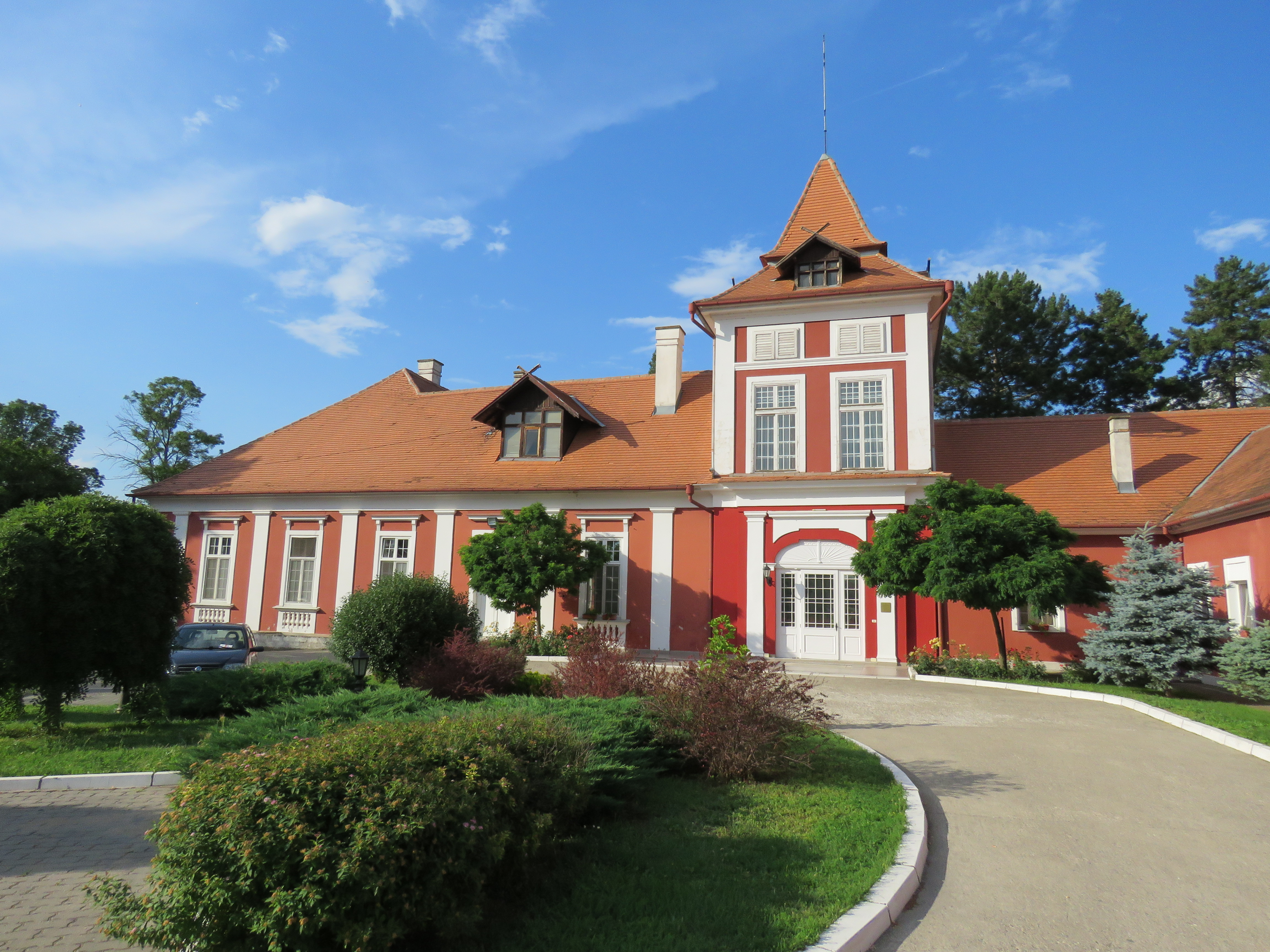
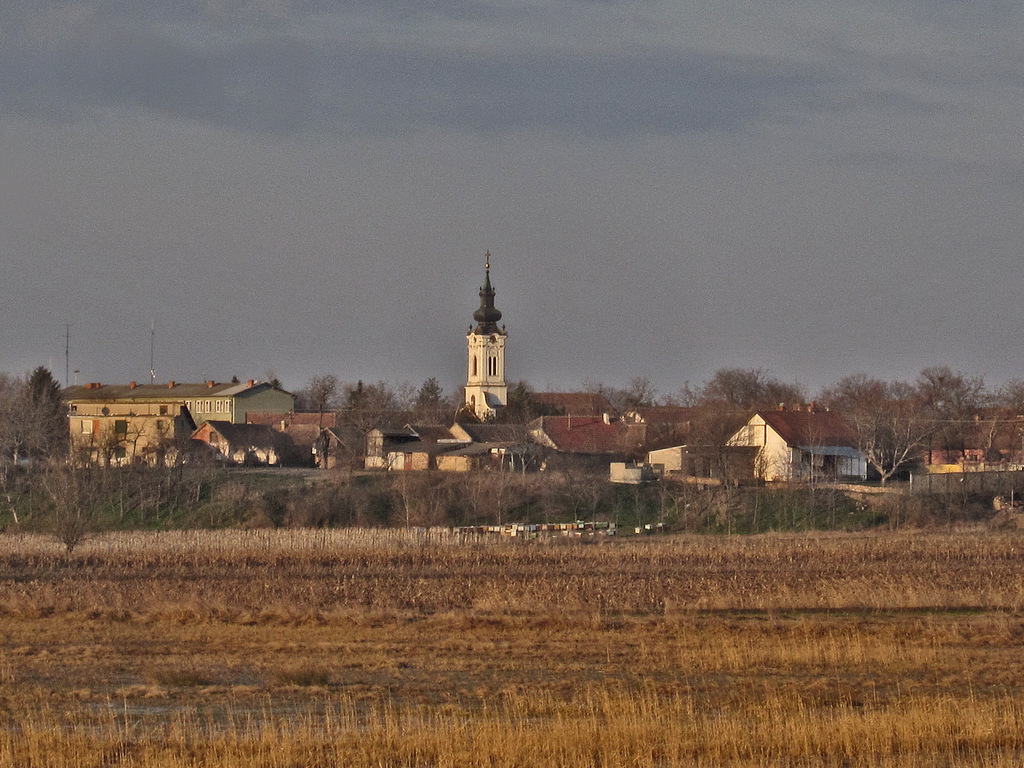
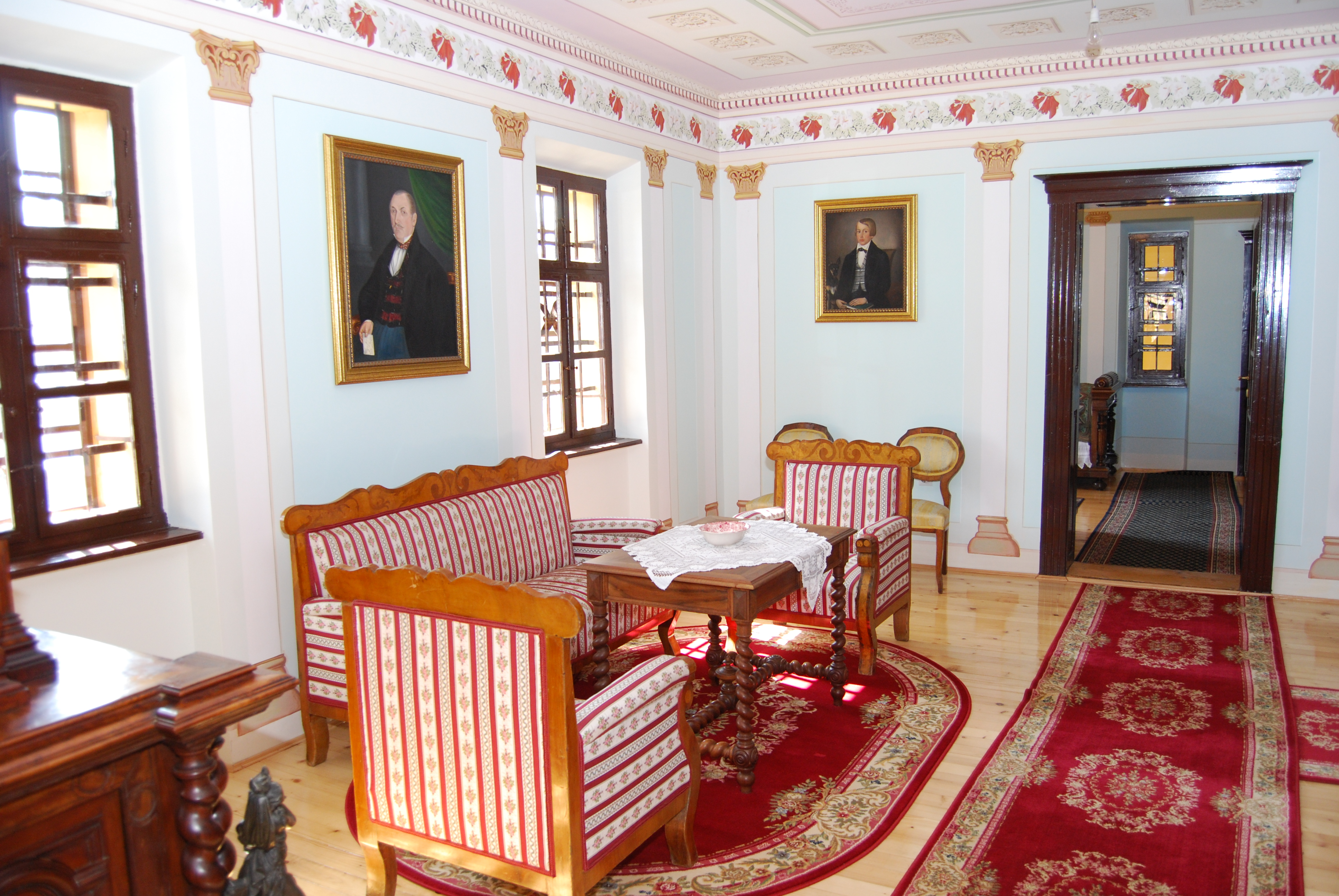
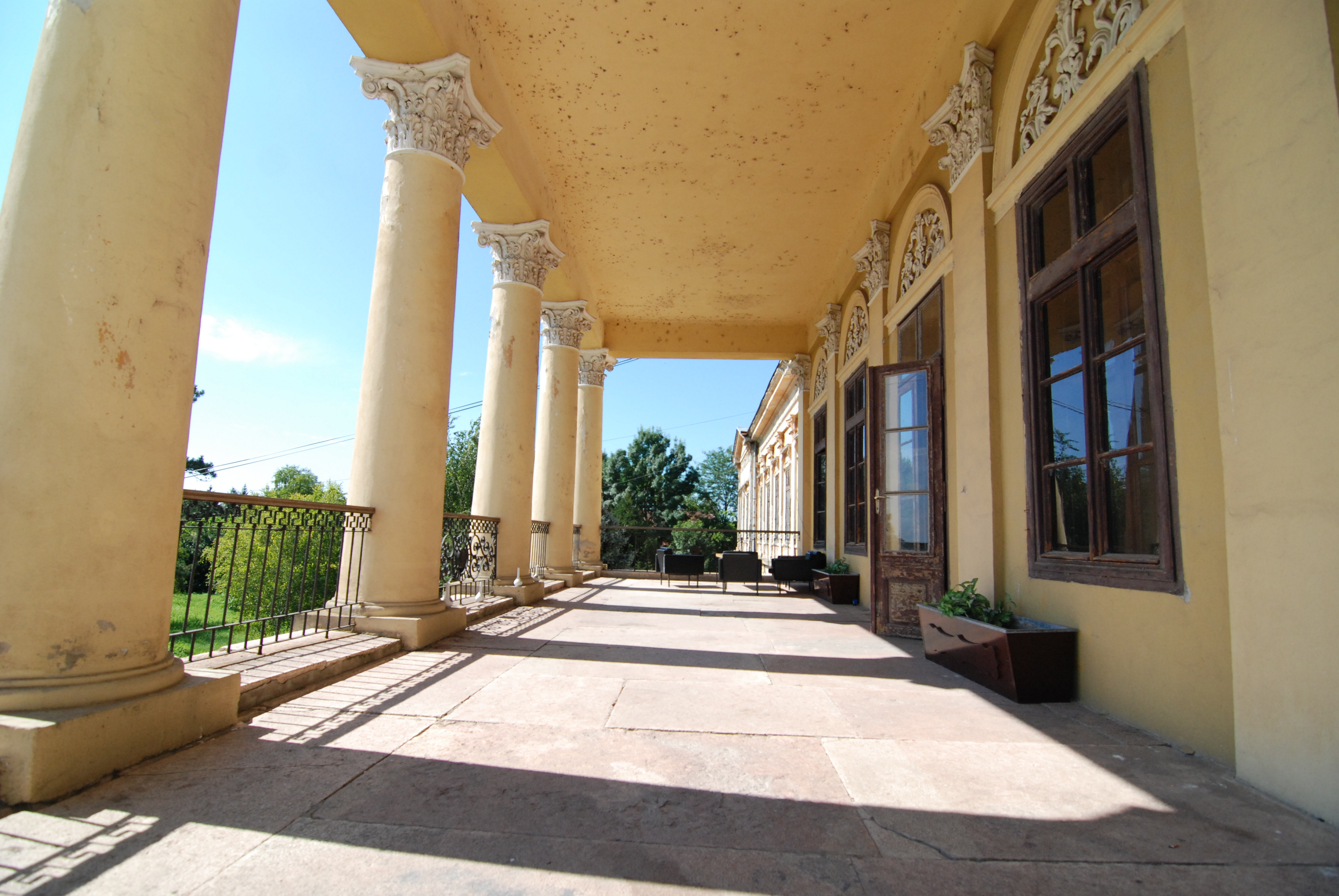
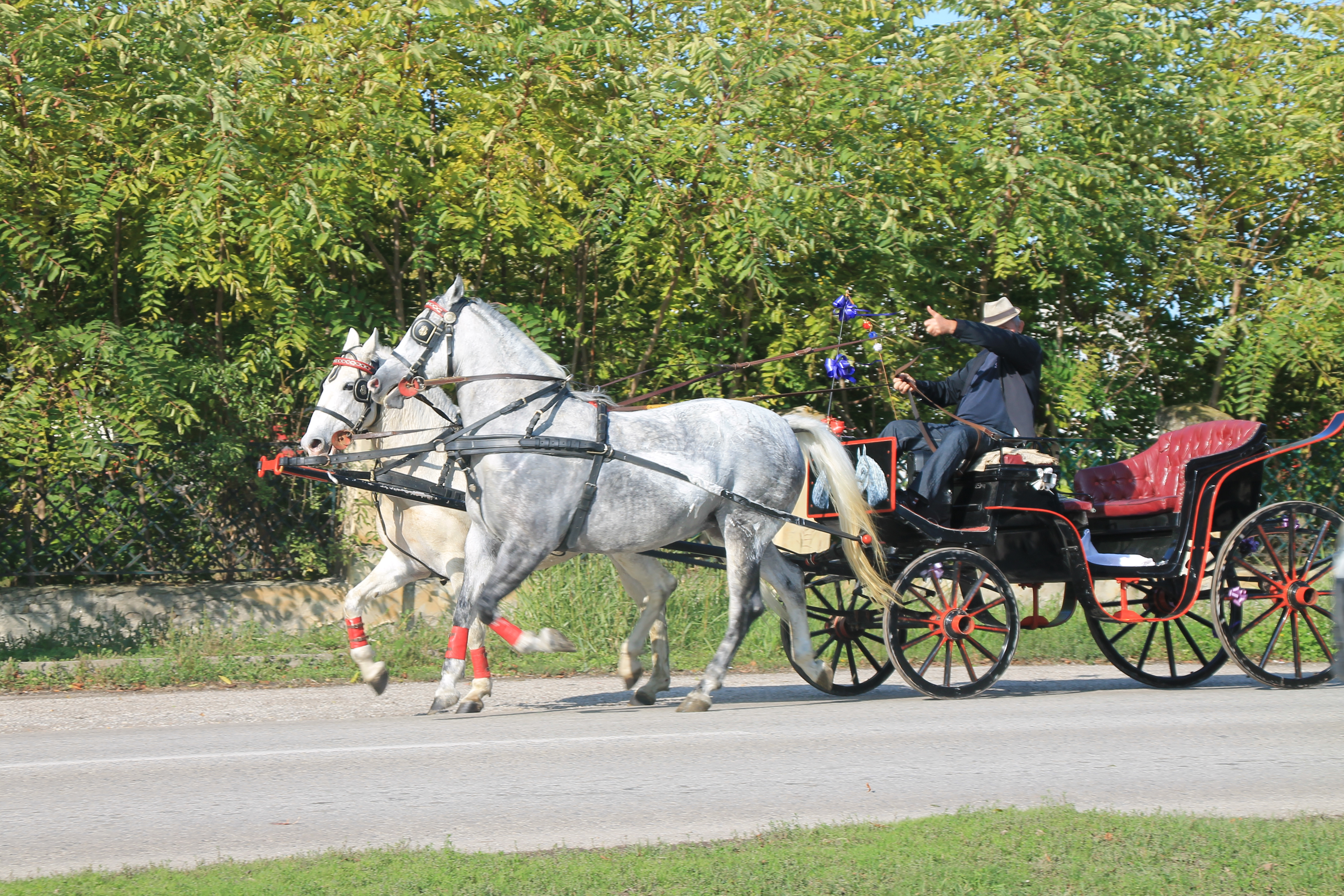
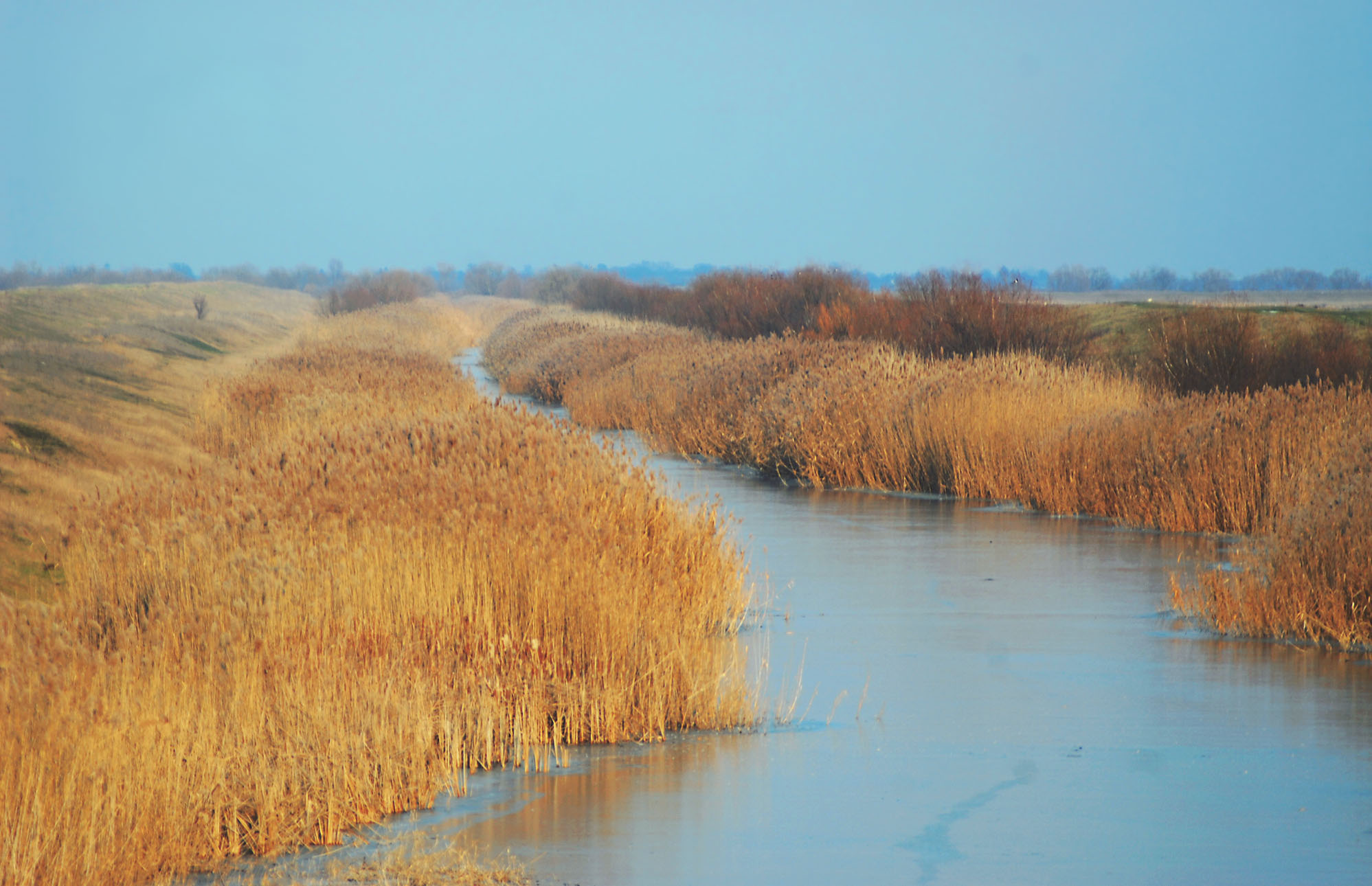
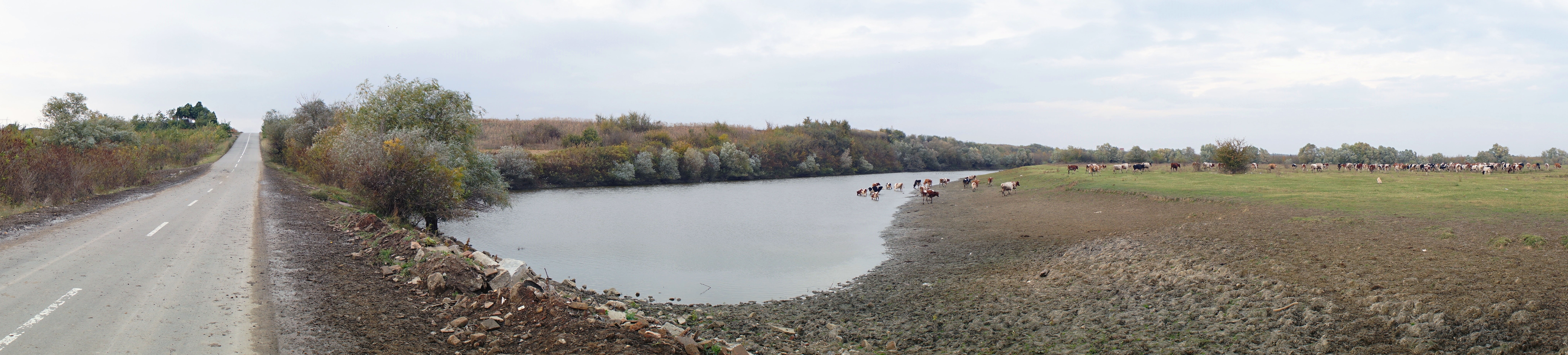
- Images from the Central Banat District

- Location of district in Serbia
- Coordinates: 45°22′N 20°23′E
- Country: Serbia
- Province: Vojvodina
- Administrative center: Zrenjanin

Government
  - Commissioner: Predrag Rađenović

Area
  - Total: 3,256 km^{2} (1,257 sq mi)

Population (2022)
  - Total: 157,711
  - Density: 48.44/km^{2} (125.5/sq mi)
- ISO 3166 code: RS-02
- Municipalities: 4 and 1 city
- Settlements: 55
- Cities and towns: 4
- Villages: 51
- Website: srednjobanatski.okrug.gov.rs

The Central Banat District (Serbian: Средњобанатски округ, romanized: Srednjobanatski okrug, pronounced [srêdɲoːbǎnaːtskiː ôkruːɡ]) is one of administrative districts of Serbia. It lies in the geographical region of Banat. According to the 2022 census, the Central Banat District has a population of 157,711 inhabitants. The administrative center is the city of Zrenjanin.

== Cities and municipalities ==
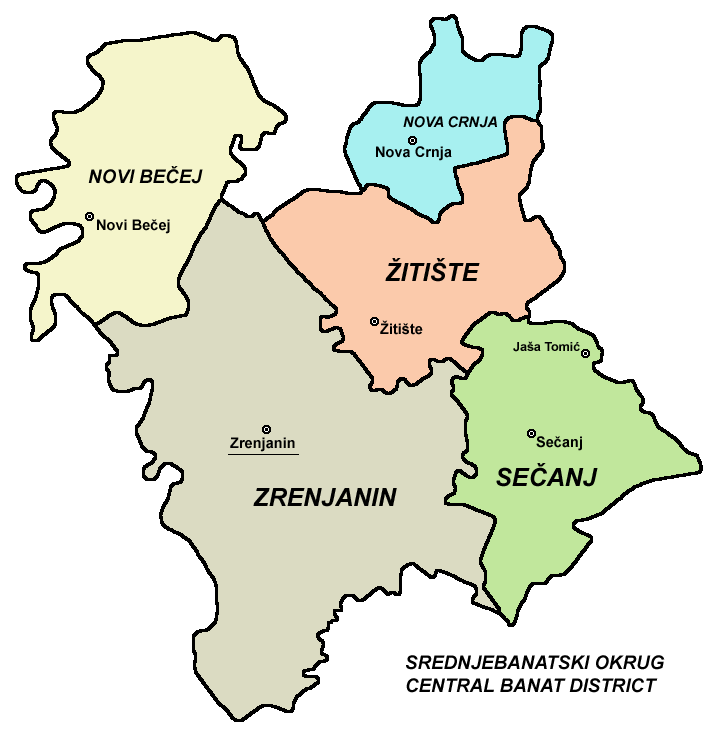

The Central Banat District encompasses the territories of one city and four municipalities:

- Zrenjanin (city)
- Novi Bečej (municipality)
- Nova Crnja (municipality)
- Sečanj (municipality)
- Žitište (municipality)

== Demographics ==
Historical population
Year	Pop.	±%
1948	218,821	—
1953	221,667	+1.3%
1961	229,812	+3.7%
1971	231,486	+0.7%
1981	230,962	−0.2%
1991	221,353	−4.2%
2002	208,456	−5.8%
2011	187,667	−10.0%
2022	157,711	−16.0%

=== Towns ===
There are two towns with over 10,000 inhabitants.

- Zrenjanin: 67,129
- Novi Bečej: 10,967

=== Ethnic structure ===
Ethnicity	Population	Share
Serbs	115,815	73.4%
Hungarians	15,765	10%
Roma	5,959	3.7%
Romanians	3,264	2%
Slovaks	1,597	1%
Others	4,618	2.9%
Undeclared/Unknown	10,693	6.8%

== See also ==
- Administrative districts of Serbia
- Administrative divisions of Serbia
- Torontál County
