= Kikinda - Žitište Municipal League =

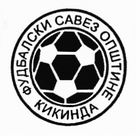
- Organising body: Kikinda-Žitište Municipal Football Association
- Founded: 2015
- First season: 2015-16
- Country: Serbia
- Province: Vojvodina
- Region: Kikinda, Žitište, Novi Bečej, Nova Crnja
- Number of clubs: 10
- Level on pyramid: 6
- Promotion to: PFL Zrenjanin
- Relegation to: no relegation
- Current champions: Jedinstvo Novi Bečej (2022–23)

Kikinda - Žitište Municipal League is one of the 52 intermunicipal association football leagues in Serbia. Inter-municipal league is the sixth tier of the football competition in Serbia. This league is composed by clubs from the municipalities of Kikinda, Žitište, Novi Bečej and Nova Crnja, and is managed by the Kikinda - Žitište Municipal Football Association. The league currently has 10 teams and the champion is promoted to the Zrenjanin District league, either directly or through play-off, depending on the season.

Kikinda - Žitište Municipal League was formed in 2015 by merging the Kikinda - Novi Bečej and Žitište - Nova Crnja municipal leagues. During the 2017–18 season, this league was called Žitište - Nova Crnja Municipal League although it contained clubs from Kikinda and Novi Bečej too.

== Champions history ==
=== Kikinda - Novi Bečej municipal league ===
| Season | Number of clubs | Champion | Points | Runner-up | Points | Third-placed | Points |
|---|---|---|---|---|---|---|---|
| 2009-10 | 6 | FK Crvena Zvezda, Rusko Selo | 51 | FK Vojvodina, Bašaid | 38 | FK Borac, Iđoš | 30 |
| 2010-11 | 6 | FK Borac, Iđoš | 43 | FK Vojvodina, Bašaid | 36 | FK ŽAK, Kikinda | 26 |
| 2011-12 | 8 | FK Jedinstvo, Bočar | 55 | FK Polet, Nakovo | 45 | FK ŽAK, Kikinda | 28 |
| 2012-13 | 7 | FK Vojvodina, Bašaid | 42 | FK Delija, Mokrin | 41 | FK ŽAK, Kikinda | 24 |
| 2013-14 | 6 | FK ŽAK, Kikinda | 44 | FK Polet, Nakovo | 36 | FK Delija, Mokrin | 36 |
| 2014-15 | 5 | FK Polet, Nakovo | 38 | FK Delija, Mokrin | 37 | FK Jedinstvo, Bočar | 22 |

=== Žitište - Nova Crnja municipal league ===
| Season | Number of clubs | Champion | Points | Runner-up | Points | Third-placed | Points |
|---|---|---|---|---|---|---|---|
| 2010-11 | 8 | FK Borac, Aleksandrovo | 58 | FK Napredak, Čestereg | 40 | FK Proleter, Međa | 38 |
| 2011-12 | 10 | FK Napredak, Čestereg | 47 | FK Proleter, Međa | 38 | FK Terekveš, Hetin | 31 |
| 2012-13 | 9 | FK Omladinac, Ravni Topolovac | 35 | FK Bega, Novi Itebej | 34 | FK Roham, Nova Crnja | 30 |
| 2013-14 | 9 | FK Napredak, Čestereg | 48 | FK Roham, Nova Crnja | 33 | FK 1. Oktobar, Srpski Itebej | 30 |
| 2014-15 | 7 | FK Roham, Nova Crnja | 50 | FK 1. Oktobar, Srpski Itebej | 36 | FK Terekveš, Hetin | 31 |

=== Kikinda - Žitište municipal league ===
| Season | Number of clubs | Champion | Points | Runner-up | Points | Third-placed | Points |
|---|---|---|---|---|---|---|---|
| 2015-16 | 12 | FK Jedinstvo, Bočar | 59 | FK Omladinac, Ravni Topolovac | 50 | FK Terekveš, Hetin | 45 |
| 2016-17 | 12 | FK Vojvodina, Novo Miloševo | 54 | FK Vojvodina, Bašaid | 48 | FK Terekveš, Hetin | 41 |
| 2017-18 | 12 | FK 2. Oktobar, Kumane | 53 | FK Delija, Mokrin | 45 | FK Napredak, Banatska Topola | 45 |
| 2018-19 | 10 | FK Jedinstvo, Bočar | 48 | FK Vojvodina, Bašaid | 43 | FK Roham, Nova Crnja | 33 |
| 2019-20 | 9 | FK Vojvodina, Bašaid | 22 | FK Napredak, Čestereg | 21 | FK 1. Oktobar, Srpski Itebej | 17 |
| 2020-21 | 6 | FK Napredak, Čestereg | 36 | FK Omladinac, Ravni Topolovac | 29 | FK Terekveš, Hetin | 18 |
| 2021-22 | 12 | FK 2. Oktobar, Kumane | 45 | FK Jedinstvo, Novi Bečej | 40 | FK Napredak, Banatska Topola | 37 |
| 2022-23 | 10 | FK Jedinstvo, Novi Bečej | 47 | FK Napredak, Banatska Topola | 44 | FK Roham, Nova Crnja | 35 |

== Clubs for the season 2022–23 ==
| Club | Place |
|---|---|
| 1. Oktobar | Srpski Itebej, Žitište |
| Borac | Aleksandrovo, Nova Crnja |
| Jedinstvo | Novi Bečej |
| Napredak | Banatska Topola, Kikinda |
| Omladinac | Ravni Topolovac, Žitište |
| Podgrmeč | Žitište |
| Proleter | Međa, Žitište |
| Roham | Nova Crnja |
| Terekveš | Hetin, Žitište |
| Vojvodina | Bašaid, Kikinda |

== See also ==
- Serbia national football team
- Serbian Superliga
- Serbian First League
- Srpska Liga
- Vojvodina League East
- Zone Leagues
