= Torda, Žitište =

Torda Торда (Serbian) Torontáltorda (Hungarian)
- Village (Selo)
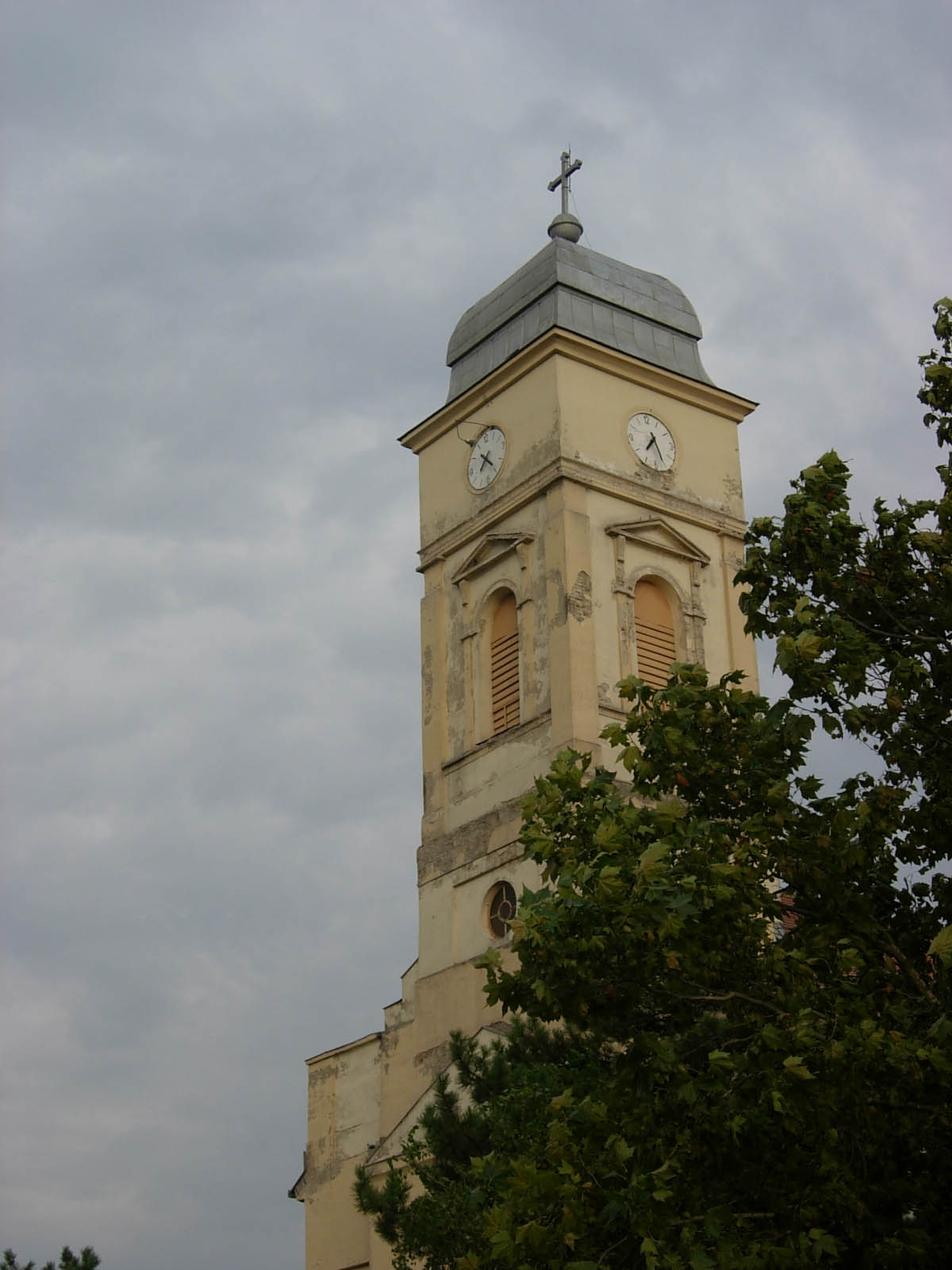
- Saint John of Nepomuk Catholic Church

- Location within Serbia Torda (Serbia) Torda (Europe)
- Coordinates: 45°35′05″N 20°27′16″E
- Country: Serbia
- Province: Vojvodina
- District: Central Banat
- Municipalities: Žitište
- Elevation: 75 m (246 ft)

Population (2002)
  - Torda: 1,771
- Time zone: UTC+1 (CET)
  - Summer (DST): UTC+2 (CEST)
- Postal code: 23214
- Area code: +381(0)23
- Car plates: ZR

Torda (Serbian Cyrillic: Торда; Hungarian: Torontáltorda or Torda) is a village in Serbia. It is situated in the Žitište municipality, in the Central Banat District, Vojvodina province. The village has a Hungarian ethnic majority (86.56%) and its population numbering 1,771 people (2002 census). The village was settled in 1789 by the Pejačević family.

== Geography ==
The surrounding villages include: Banatsko Karađorđevo, Čestereg, Banatski Dvor, Melenci, Bašaid, etc.

== Historical population ==
- 1961: 3,803
- 1971: 3,345
- 1981: 2,697
- 1991: 2,183

== See also ==
- List of places in Serbia
- List of cities, towns and villages in Vojvodina
