= Itebej =

Itebej can refer to:

- Srpski Itebej, a village in Vojvodina, Serbia.
- Novi Itebej, a village in Vojvodina, Serbia.
