= Branko Lazarević =

Serbian footballer (born 1984)

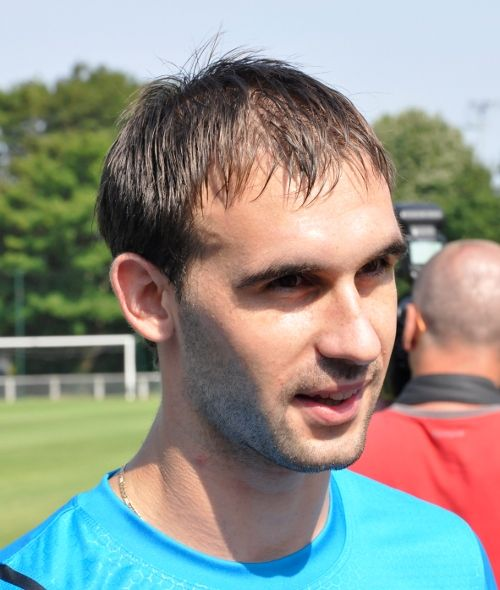
- Lazarević in 2010

Personal information
- Full name: Branko Lazarević
- Date of birth: 14 May 1984 (age 42)
- Place of birth: Gračanica, SFR Yugoslavia
- Height: 1.85 m (6 ft 1 in)
- Position: Defender

Youth career
- 1993–1994: ŽAK Kikinda
- 1994–1998: OFK Kikinda
- 1998–2002: Vojvodina

Senior career*
Years	Team	Apps	(Gls)
2002–2005	Vojvodina	70	(2)
2006–2007	ČSK Čelarevo	46	(2)
2007–2010	OFK Beograd	57	(1)
2010–2013	Caen	5	(0)
2010–2013	Caen B	12	(0)
Total		190	(5)

International career
2003–2004	Serbia and Montenegro U21	3	(0)
2004	Serbia and Montenegro Olympic	2	(0)
- * Club domestic league appearances and goals

Branko Lazarević (Serbian Cyrillic: Бранко Лазаревић; born 14 May 1984) is a Serbian former professional footballer who played as a defender.

== Club career ==
Born in Gračanica, Bosnia and Herzegovina, Lazarević played in the youth teams of ŽAK Kikinda, OFK Kikinda, and Vojvodina. He made his senior debuts with Vojvodina in the 2002–03 season. In the 2006 winter transfer window, Lazarević switched to second-tier club ČSK Čelarevo.

In the summer of 2007, Lazarević signed with OFK Beograd. He spent three seasons at the club, before moving abroad to France and joining Ligue 1 side Caen, on a three-year deal.

== International career ==
Lazarević represented Serbia and Montenegro at the 2004 Summer Olympics. He appeared in two games, as the team exited in the first round having finished last in Group C, behind Argentina, Australia, and Tunisia. At youth level, Lazarević was also capped for the U21s.
