= Boris Petrović =

Serbian singer from Žitište (born 1987)

- Birth name: Boris Petrović
- Born: 28 January 1987 (age 38); Zrenjanin, Yugoslavia
- Genres: Pop
- Occupation: Singer
- Instrument: Vocals
- Years active: 2012–present

Boris Petrović (Serbian Cyrillic: Борис Петровић; born 28 January 1987) is a Serbian singer from Žitište. He became famous during 2nd season of The First Voice of Serbia.

== Career ==
=== Prvi glas Srbije: 2012–present ===
In 2012, Petrović participated in second season of The First Voice of Serbia. He ended up on 5th place. During the show finals, Boris sang following songs:

- 1st Night: Toni Cetinski - Onaj ko te ljubi sretan je
- 2nd Night: Zdravko Čolić - Pusti, pusti modu
- 3rd Night: Zvonko Bogdan - Čamac na Tisi
- 4th Night: Crvena Jabuka - Tugo, nesrećo
- 5th Night: Joe Cocker - You Can Leave Your Hat On
- 6th Night: Bon Jovi - It's my Life
- 7th Night: Indexi - Bacila je sve niz reku / Survivor - Eye of the Tiger
- 8th Night: Bryan Adams - Everything I do, I do it for you / Boža Nikolić - Lažem sebe da mogu bez tebe
- 9th Night: Saša Kovačević - Lapsus / James Brown - "I Got You (I Feel Good)" / Generacija 5 - Povedi me u noć

During this contest, Boris became very popular. Everybody recognize him as "songful gas jockey", because he is working on Gas Station in Žitište.
