= Napredak =

Napredak, which translates from Serbo-Croatian as Progress, may refer to:

- HKD Napredak, cultural society of Croats in Bosnia and Herzegovina
- FK Napredak Kruševac, Serbian football club
- FK Napredak Aleksinac, Serbian football club
- FK Napredak Banatska Topola, Serbian football club
- NK SAŠK Napredak, Bosnia and Herzegovina football club
- OK Napredak Odžak, Bosnia and Herzegovina volleyball club
