= Jimmy Stepanoff =

German visual artist and painter (born 1959)

- Born: Friedrich Hieronymus Freiherr von Unterreiner; February 15, 1959 (age 67); Žitište, SR Serbia, SFR Yugoslavia
- Known for: Painting, Film, Comics
- Notable work: Painting & comics cycle “Die Nibelungen”; films The NeverEnding Story and The Name of the Rose

Jimmy Stepanoff (born February 15, 1959) is a German visual artist and painter, mostly known for his work in movies The NeverEnding Story and The Name of the Rose and the painting & comics cycle “Die Nibelungen”.

== Early life ==
He was born in Žitište, Banat region in Serbia, in the family of Danube Swabians. His full name is Friedrich Hieronymus Freiherr von Unterreiner.

== Career ==
In the late seventies he moved to Munich, Germany, where he did animated movies, design and graphics. He started in the film industry in 1979, doing storyboards, backgrounds and artistic concepts for films. He worked in about 60 featured movies and The Name of the Rose.

He had some 40 solo painting exhibitions. He is the author of a highly evaluated comics and painting epic cycle with over 200 works, including “Die Nibelungen”.

He lives and works in Munich. He is also a member of Serbian Comics Authors' Association (Udruženje stripskih umetnika Srbije).

== Bibliography (choice) ==
- Behind the dark, Ed. Painting Century Box, München, 2000.
- Die Nibelungen: das geheime Königreich. Offsetdruck. 2002.
- Die Nibelungen: Siegfrieds Jugend. Caminando-Verlag. 2009. ISBN 978-3-9812888-1-0.
