= FK Napredak Banatska Topola =

- Full name: Fudbalski klub Napredak Banatska Topola
- Nickname: Topolčani
- Founded: 1946; 80 years ago
- Ground: Stadion FK Napredak, Banatska Topola, Serbia
- Capacity: 200 all seated
- President: Oskar Balint
- Head Coach: Ivan Vujin
- League: PFL Zrenjanin
- 2024–25: PFL Zrenjanin, 12th
Home colours	Away colours	Third colours

Fudbalski klub Napredak (Serbian Cyrillic: Фудбалски клуб Haпpeдaк) is a football club based in the city of Banatska Topola, Serbia. The name Napredak means "progress" in Serbian. Currently competing in the PFL Zrenjanin.

== History ==
Currently the club is one of the oldest clubs in the municipality of Kikinda. Founded, according to some evidence, even in the 1930s. Since that time the population of the village were mostly ethnic Hungarian club is called 'ELÖRE (FORWARD)' and did not compete, but only played friendly matches with some of the, at that time, the existing clubs in the surrounding areas . The stadium is located across from today's Catholic cemetery. During World War II in the team they played German soldiers, just after the war in the summer of 1946. was formally established football club Napredak.

The first and only leather ball, at the time, brought the Peter Toth, who later was one of the newly established club players.

Initially the club was competing in the so-called Potisje region where the clubs were from the municipality of Kikinda, Ada and Kanjiža. The club has not competed from 1961 to 1963 due to lack of funds. In early seventies the club was competing in the Municipal League Žitište – Nova Crnja. He later went to the reorganization under the auspices of the Football Association Zrenjanjin, where he was until 1992. when the championship was canceled because of war in former Yugoslavia. After one more reorganization, the club was competing in the county league Kikinda – Žitište until 2009.

Now the club competes in, the newly formed, Kikinda - Žitište Municipal League.

The greatest success of the club's place in the Regional League Zrenjanin, 2005/06 season, on his 60th birthday.

In cup competitions on the territory of Kikinda – Novi Bečej, had no significant results.

FK Napredak 2005. for the first time in club history reported a pioneering team to compete in the Kikinda - Novi Bečej Municipal League, in competition, mainly, clubs from Vojvodina League East. The same team has also played a cadet in the Kikinda - Novi Bečej Municipal League. They have played an important role in this competition until the end of 2009/10 season, when the cadets joined the first team.

== Recent results ==
Season	Tier	League	Pos	G	W	D	L	GF	GA	GE	Pts	CUP
2009–10	6	Kikinda – Novi Bečej Municipal League	6	20	2	3	15	20	73	−53	9	Not qualified
2010–11	6	Kikinda – Novi Bečej Municipal League	5	20	6	2	12	29	41	−12	20	Not qualified
2011–12	6	Kikinda – Novi Bečej Municipal League	8	21	3	4	14	24	79	−55	13	Not qualified
2012–13	6	Kikinda – Novi Bečej Municipal League	7	18	2	4	12	13	61	−48	10	Not qualified
2013–14	6	Kikinda – Novi Bečej Municipal League	6	20	0	3	17	21	56	−35	3	Not qualified
2014–15	6	Kikinda – Novi Bečej Municipal League	5	16	1	1	14	21	51	−30	4	Not qualified
2015–16	6	Žitište – Kikinda Municipal League	6	22	9	3	10	45	52	−7	30	Not qualified
2016–17	6	Žitište – Kikinda Municipal League	11	22	5	5	12	34	62	−28	19 (−1)	Not qualified
2017–18	6	Žitište – Nova Crnja Municipal League	3	20	14	3	3	69	29	+40	45	Not qualified
2018–19	6	Kikinda – Žitište Municipal League	7	18	5	3	10	35	48	−13	18	Not qualified
2019–20	6	Kikinda – Žitište Municipal League	9	8	0	2	6	11	28	−17	2	Not qualified
2020–21	6	Kikinda – Žitište Municipal League	6	15	3	3	9	20	39	−19	12	Not qualified
2021–22	6	Kikinda – Žitište Municipal League	5	16	7	0	9	38	39	−1	20 (−1)	Not qualified
2022–23	6	Kikinda – Žitište Municipal League	1	21	17	2	2	62	20	+42	53	Not qualified
2023/24.	5	PFL Zrenjanin	10	28	10	3	15	43	49	−6	33	Not qualified
2024/25.	5	PFL Zrenjanin	12	30	13	3	14	57	61	−4	42	Not qualified
