= Vincaid =

Settlement in Kikinda, Serbia

Coordinates: 45°41′05″N 20°25′24″E

Vincaid (Serbian Cyrillic: Винцаид) is a settlement (hamlet) in the municipality of Kikinda, Republic of Serbia. It is officially classified as part of the village of Banatska Topola. Located near the Kikinda-Zrenjanin road, the settlement was at first the estate of a family from which it got its name. Between the two world wars, the government made a futile attempt to turn this hamlet into a settlement of 120 households.
