= Mihalj Keri =

Yugoslav footballer (born 1951)

Personal information
- Date of birth: 15 January 1951 (age 75)
- Place of birth: Kikinda, FPR Yugoslavia
- Position: Defender

Youth career
- –1967: ŽAK Kikinda

Senior career*
Years	Team	Apps	(Gls)
1967–1968	ŽAK Kikinda		
1968–1978	Red Star Belgrade	210	(6)
1979–1981	Los Angeles Aztecs	91	(6)
1980–1981	Los Angeles Aztecs (indoor)	18	(8)
1982	Jacksonville Tea Men	13	(0)
1982	San Jose Earthquakes	9	(0)
1982–1983	Golden Bay Earthquakes (indoor)	34	(0)
1983–1984	Golden Bay Earthquakes	48	(0)
- * Club domestic league appearances and goals

Mihalj Keri (Serbian Cyrillic: Mиxaљ Kepи; born 15 January 1951) is a Yugoslav retired association football player who professionally played in Yugoslavia and the United States.

Born in Kikinda, SR Serbia, SFR Yugoslavia, his father was a footballer. Keri started his career by playing in local side ŽAK Kikinda where he debuted in the first-team being only 16. Scouts of numerous clubs noticed this youngster and, while his parents were favoring a move to FK Vojvodina, Keri himself decided to join Red Star Belgrade in 1968. At that time Miljan Miljanić was Red Star coach and he fancied Keri because of his calm character, specially when compared to other established stars which had exuberant lives. He debuted for Red Star Belgrade first-team in the 1969–70 Yugoslav First League making 13 league appearances that season, quite a remarkable achievement for an 18-year-old youngster at that time. Initially he played as a striker, but he also played as a midfielder and a full-back as well. Since then he became a regular in the team for the following decade only missing the 1976–77 season because of the Yugoslav Army conscription. He left Red Star during the winter break of the 1978–79 season and moved to the United States.

In 1979, he moved to the United States where he signed with the Los Angeles Aztecs of the North American Soccer League. He played three outdoor and one indoor seasons with the Aztecs before moving to the Jacksonville Tea Men for the beginning of the 1982 season. He was a 1979, 1980 and 1981 Second Team All Star with the Aztecs. In July 1982, the Tea Men sent him to the San Jose Earthquakes in exchange for cash and future considerations. He played three seasons with the Earthquakes, the last two with the team under the name Golden Bay Earthquakes. He was an NASL Honorable Mention All Star selection in 1983. Keri and his teammates also spent the 1982–1983 indoor season playing in the Major Indoor Soccer League.
