= FK Polet Nakovo =

Polet Nakovo
- Full name: Fudbalski Klub Polet Nakovo
- Nickname: Barcelona
- Founded: 1946; 80 years ago
- Ground: FK Polet, Nakovo
- Capacity: 3,000
- Chairman: Danilo Vukobrat
- Manager: Sapa Kresoja
- League: PFL Zrenjanin
- 2024–25: Vojvodina League East, 12th (relegated)
Home colours	Away colours

FK Polet (Serbian Cyrillic: ФК Полет) is a Serbian football club based in Nakovo, Kikinda, Serbia. The club currently competes in the PFL Zrenjanin, Serbian fifth level of football competition.

== History ==
The club was founded in 1946 in Nakovo.

== Recent results ==
Season	Tier	League	Pos	G	W	D	L	GF	GA	GE	Pts	CUP
2008/09.	4	Vojvodina League East	15	34	10	7	17	40	54	−14	37	Not qualified
2009/10.	4	Vojvodina League East	18	34	2	1	31	22	99	–77	7	Not qualified
2010/11.	5	PFL Zrenjanin	16	30	2	2	26	29	93	–64	8	Not qualified
2011/12.	6	Kikinda – Novi Bečej Municipal League	2	21	15	0	6	74	40	+34	45	Not qualified
2012/13.	6	Kikinda – Novi Bečej Municipal League	5	18	5	5	8	24	29	–5	20	Not qualified
2013/14.	6	Kikinda – Novi Bečej Municipal League	2	20	11	3	6	42	27	+15	36	Not qualified
2014/15.	6	Kikinda – Novi Bečej Municipal League	1	16	12	2	2	38	10	+28	38	Not qualified
2015/16.	5	PFL Zrenjanin	1	30	23	2	5	92	26	+66	71	Not qualified
2016/17.	4	Vojvodina League East	7	30	11	6	13	62	52	+10	39	Not qualified
2017/18.	4	Vojvodina League East	16	30	4	2	24	24	110	–86	14	Not qualified
2018/19.	5	PFL Zrenjanin	13	30	10	3	17	45	73	–28	33	Not qualified
2019/20.	5	PFL Zrenjanin	13	17	4	4	9	40	30	+10	16	Not qualified
2020/21.	5	PFL Zrenjanin	3	32	18	3	11	73	41	+32	57	Not qualified
2021/22.	5	PFL Zrenjanin	2	28	21	3	4	77	31	+46	66	Not qualified
2022/23.	5	PFL Zrenjanin	3	30	17	6	7	82	41	+41	57	Not qualified
2023/24.	5	PFL Zrenjanin	2	28	21	3	4	90	38	+52	66	Not qualified
2024/25.	4	Vojvodina League East	12	30	11	2	17	52	75	–23	35	Not qualified
