= Church of the Holy Archangel Gabriel, Bočar =

Serbian Orthodox church in Vojvodina, Serbia

Church of the Holy Archangels Gabriel
- Црква светог арханђела Гаврила
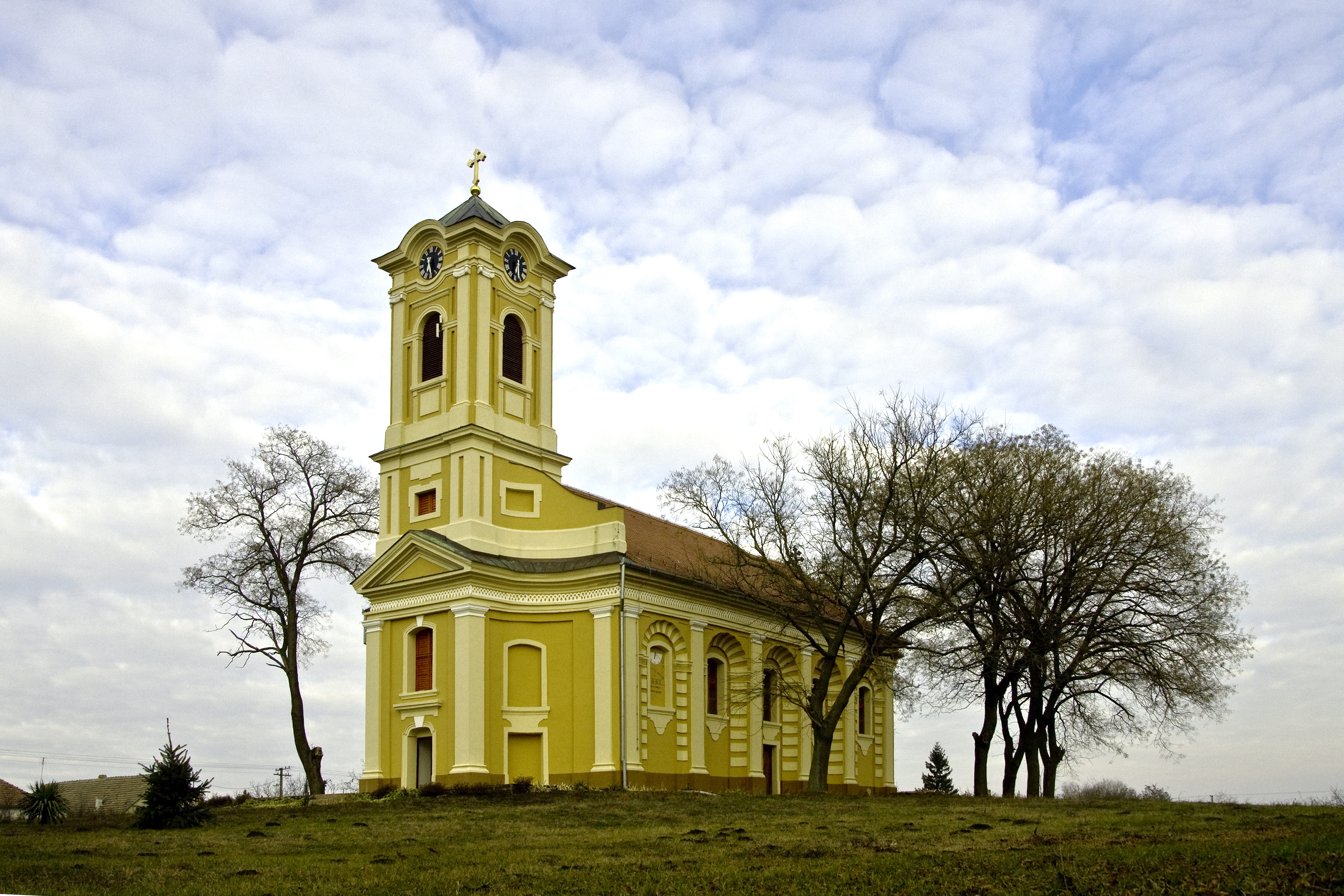
- Church of the Holy Archangel Gabriel
- Church of the Holy Archangels Gabriel
- 45°46′14″N 20°16′59″E
- Location: Sándor Petőfi Street 2, Bočar, Vojvodina

Cultural Heritage of Serbia
- Type: Cultural Monument of Great Importance
- Designated: 1995
- Reference no.: СК 1130
- Country: Serbia
- Denomination: Serbian Orthodox

History
- Status: Church
- Dedication: Archangel Gabriel

Architecture
- Functional status: Active
- Years built: 1814

Administration
- Archdiocese: Eparchy of Banat

The Church of the Holy Archangel Gabriel (Serbian: Црква светог арханђела Гаврила) in Bočar is Serbian Orthodox church in Vojvodina, Serbia. The church was built in 1814. The building is erected at a low and most probably natural elevation. The church features a single-nave design with a five-sided altar apse, an extended nave, and a two-level bell tower positioned above the western entrance. The iconostasis dates to the second half of the 18th century. The exact date of its creation and the names of its authors are unknown. Records indicate that it was originally part of the Serbian Orthodox Church in Vranjevo and was acquired as an older piece in 1826 before being relocated to Bočar.

== Protection ==
The Church was officially protected at the national level on December 8, 1995, when it was entered into the central register under the designation SK 1130. The protection process was based on a decision by the Provincial Institute for the Protection of Cultural Monuments of the Socialist Autonomous Province of Vojvodina issued on September 18, 1985. The responsible institution maintaining the local register is the Institute for the Protection of Cultural Monuments in Zrenjanin.

== See also ==
- Eparchy of Banat
