= Bikač =

Settlement in Kikinda, Serbia

Coordinates: 45.6481°N 20.3897°E

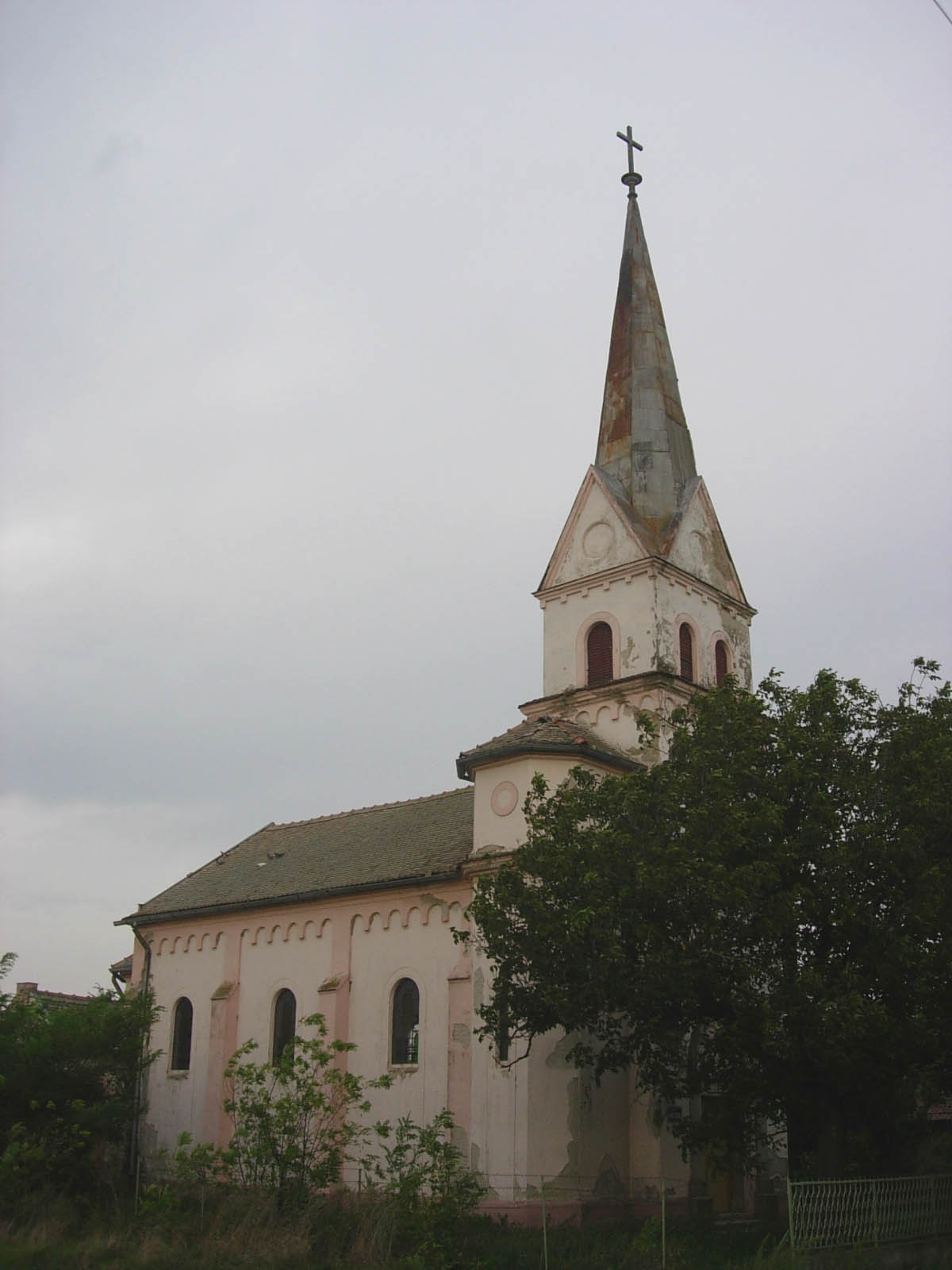
Catholic Church in Bikač

Bikač (Serbian Cyrillic: Бикач) is a settlement (hamlet) in the Kikinda municipality, Republic of Serbia. Officially, Bikač is not classified as a separate settlement, but as a part of the village of Bašaid.

== History ==
In 1422, the hamlet of Bikač was the estate of a family of the same name. After its destruction by the Ottoman army, it was recorded again on maps from 1761. In 1804, 40 Hungarian families arrived at the settlement, followed by another 60 families a decade later. At the beginning of the 20th century, the hamlet consisted of 70 households, inhabited by 239 Germans and 154 Hungarians. According to a census from 1971, the population of Bikač was 324.
