= Banatsko Višnjićevo =

Banatsko Višnjićevo Банатско Вишњићево (Serbian)
- Village (Selo)
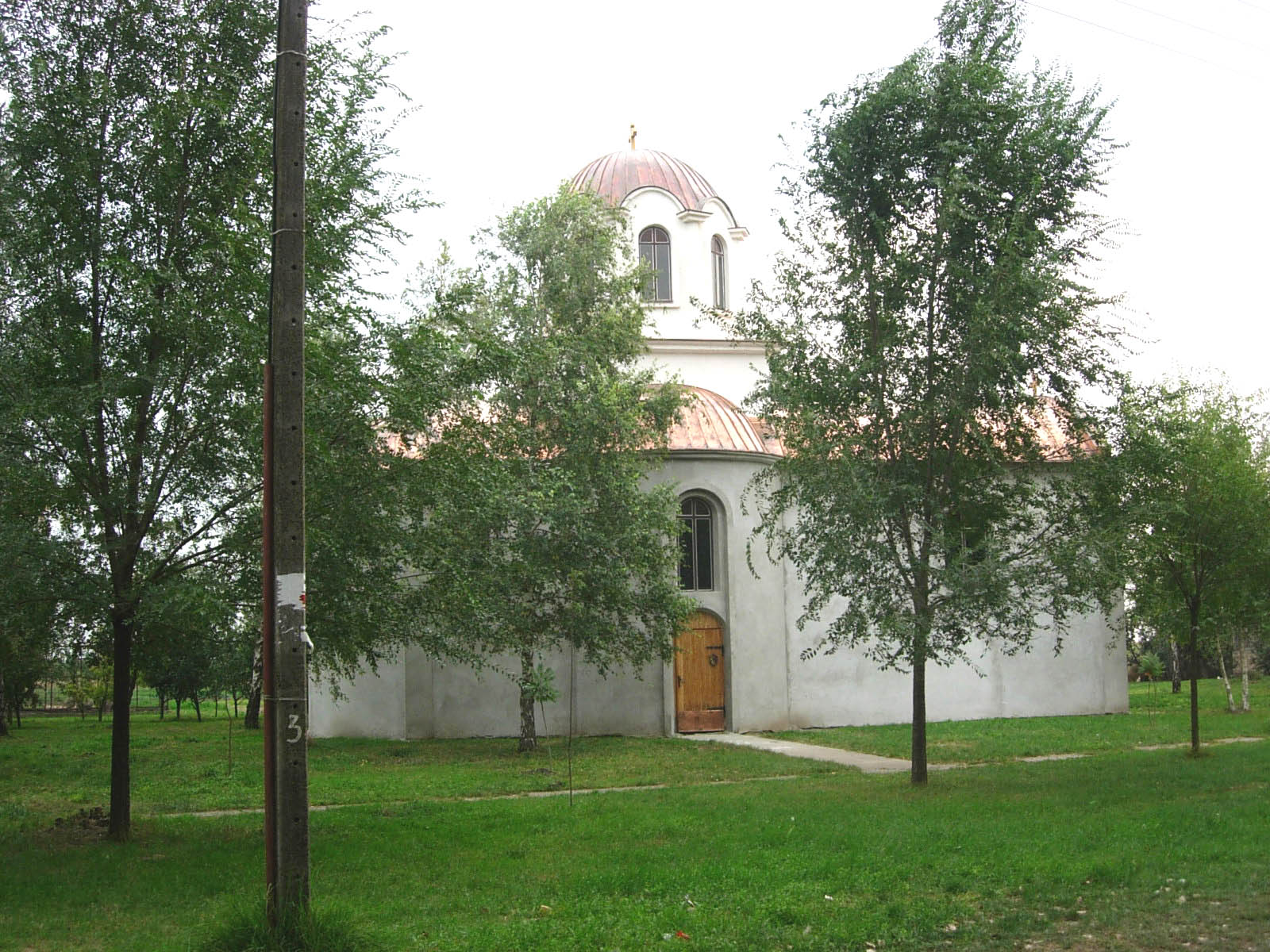
- The new Orthodox Church

- Location within Serbia Banatsko Višnjićevo (Serbia) Banatsko Višnjićevo (Europe)
- Coordinates: 45°26′26″N 20°40′30″E
- Country: Serbia
- Province: Vojvodina
- District: Central Banat
- Municipalities: Žitište
- Elevation: 59 m (194 ft)

Population (2002)
  - Banatsko Višnjićevo: 384
- Time zone: UTC+1 (CET)
  - Summer (DST): UTC+2 (CEST)
- Area code: +381(0)23
- Car plates: ZR

Banatsko Višnjićevo (Serbian Cyrillic: Банатско Вишњићево; Hungarian: Vida) is a village in Serbia. It is situated in the Žitište municipality, in the Central Banat District, Vojvodina province. The village has a Serb ethnic majority (94.27%) and its population was 384 as of the 2002 census.

== Name ==
The exact origin of the village name is unclear. It was either named after the famous Serb epic poet Filip Višnjić or for the cherry tree ("višnja" in Serbian) that was founded here by the first settlers, or after the surveyor Višnjić, who performed first measuring in the settlement. In Hungarian the village is known as Vida.

== Historical population ==
- 1961: 677
- 1971: 577
- 1981: 458
- 1991: 391

== See also ==
- List of places in Serbia
- List of cities, towns and villages in Vojvodina
