= Nakovo =

Place in Kikinda, Vojvodina, Serbia

Nakovo Наково (Serbian)
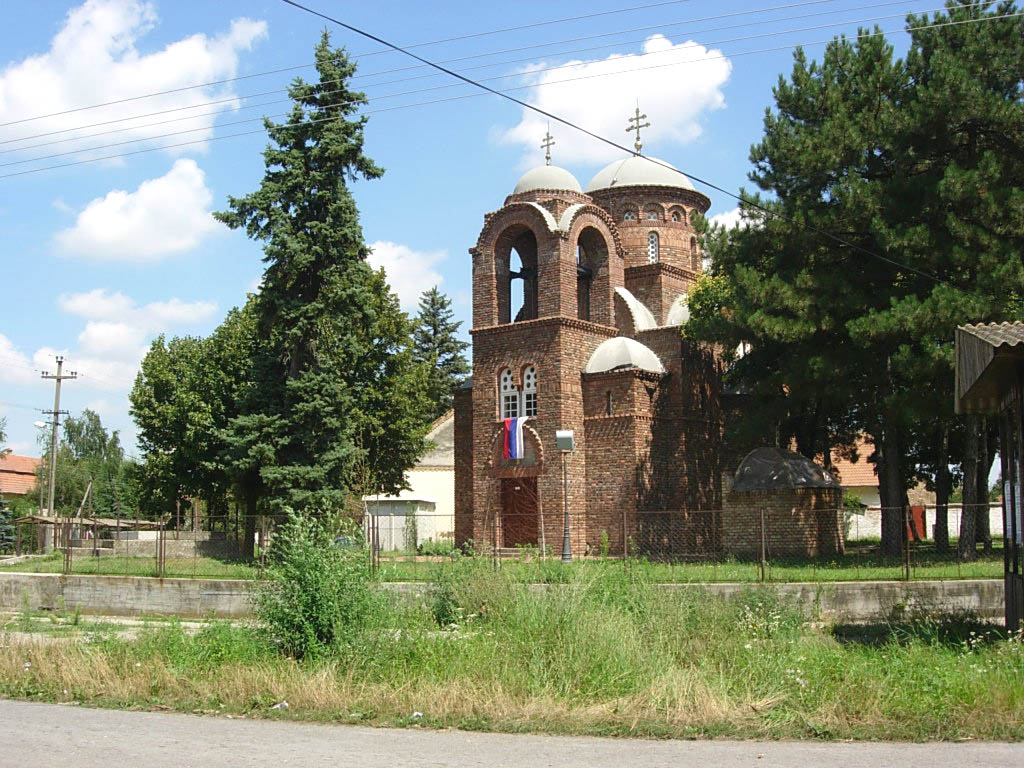
- The new Orthodox Church in the village

- Location of Nakovo within Serbia Nakovo (Serbia) Nakovo (Europe)
- Coordinates: 45°52′16″N 20°34′01″E
- Country: Serbia
- Province: Vojvodina
- Region: Banat
- District: North Banat
- Municipality: Kikinda
- Elevation: 91 m (299 ft)

Population (2022)
  - Nakovo: 1,444
- Time zone: UTC+1 (CET)
  - Summer (DST): UTC+2 (CEST)
- Postal code: 23311
- Area code: +381(0)230
- Car plates: KI

Nakovo (Serbian Cyrillic: Наково) is a village located in the Kikinda municipality of the North Banat District of Serbia, in the Autonomous Province of Vojvodina. It is situated near the border with Romania. According to the 2022 census, the village had a population of 1,444 inhabitants.

== Name ==
Its name originates from Count Nako, who founded the village in 1784. In Serbian, the village is known as Nakovo or Наково, in Croatian as Nakovo, in Hungarian as Nákófalva, and in German as Nakodorf.

== History ==
In the Middle Ages, a village by the name of Szollos (Seleš, Szőllős, Seleuš, Sellesch) existed on the location of present-day Nakovo. During Ottoman rule (16th-17th century), Seleš was populated by ethnic Serbs. By the first half of the 18th century, the village no longer existed and the area was an uninhabited heath.

In 1782, the area came under the possession of the Nako brothers, Greek traders from Macedonia. In order to provide a labour force for his estate, Kristifor Nako built 50 houses in 1784, and settled them with ethnic Hungarians.

In 1790, a new wave of colonists settled the village. This time, they were Germans, who numbered 176 families with 706 family members. In 1793, the population of the village numbered 1,054 people, mostly Germans and some French people as well. During this time, Hungarians no longer inhabited the village - they departed from it because of the harsh conditions of life. In 1836, the village had 1,775 Catholic and 6 Orthodox inhabitants, while in 1911, the population of the village numbered 538 households with 2,834 inhabitants.

In 1918, after World War I, the village became part of the newly formed Kingdom of Serbs, Croats and Slovenes (future Yugoslavia). During World War II (1941–1944), it was included into the German-occupied Banat region. As a consequence of events during the war and the Axis occupation, most of the German population fled from the village with the German Army in 1944. The smaller part of the population that stayed in the village was sent to prison camps. In 1945–1946, Serb families from Bosnia came to the settlement.

== See also ==
- List of cities, towns and villages in Vojvodina
- FK Polet Nakovo
