= FK ŽAK Kikinda =

ŽAK Kikinda
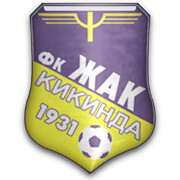
- Full name: Fudbalski klub ŽAK Kikinda
- Nickname: Žuti Mravi (Železničari)
- Founded: 1931; 95 years ago
- Ground: Stadium FK ŽAK, Kikinda, Serbia
- Capacity: 2,000
- Chairman: Nebojša Laketa
- League: Kikinda - Žitište Municipal League
- 2024–25: PFL Zrenjanin, 13th (relegated)
Home colours	Away colours

FK ŽAK Kikinda (Serbian Cyrillic: ФК ЖАК Кикинда) is a football club from Kikinda, Serbia which competes in the Kikinda - Žitište Municipal League, Serbian sixth level of football competition. The club colors are blue and yellow. ŽAK means Železničarski atletski klub which translates in English to Railway Athletic Club.

== History ==
ŽAK was founded in 1931. ŽAK was one of the two representatives of the Novi Sad Football Subassociation in the 1935–36 Yugoslav Football Championship which was played in a cup format. ŽAK was eliminated in the eighth finals by the other representative of the same subassociation, NAK Novi Sad, with a total score of 7–3, 0–4 at home and 3–3 as guests.

== Supporters ==
ŽAK supporters are known as Žuti Mravi (Yellow Ants).

== Stadium ==
Home games are played at the stadium of FK ŽAK, which is located in a part of town called Vašarište, and has a capacity for 2,000 spectators.

== Rivalries ==
The main rival of FK ŽAK is their city rivals OFK Kikinda.

== Recent results ==
Season	Tier	League	Pos	G	W	D	L	GF	GA	GE	Pts	CUP
2006/07.	4	Vojvodina League East	7	28	11	8	9	60	51	+9	41	Not qualified
2007/08.	4	Vojvodina League East	8	30	12	7	11	52	40	+12	43	Not qualified
2008/09.	4	Vojvodina League East	18	34	6	10	18	58	80	−22	28	Not qualified
2009/10.	5	PFL Zrenjanin	15	28	4	3	21	21	97	−76	15	Not qualified
2010/11.	6	Kikinda – Novi Bečej Municipal League	3	20	8	4	8	35	36	−1	26 (−2)	Not qualified
2011/12.	6	Kikinda – Novi Bečej Municipal League	3	21	8	4	9	32	32	0	28	Not qualified
2012/13.	6	Kikinda – Novi Bečej Municipal League	3	18	7	3	8	30	25	+5	24	Not qualified
2013/14.	6	Kikinda – Novi Bečej Municipal League	1	20	13	5	2	56	16	+40	44	Not qualified
2014/15.	5	PFL Zrenjanin	2	30	18	9	3	78	30	+48	63	Not qualified
2015/16.	4	Banat Zone League	13	30	11	3	16	36	63	−27	35 (−1)	Not qualified
2016/17.	4	Vojvodina League East	11	30	11	4	15	46	66	−20	36 (−1)	Not qualified
2017/18.	4	Vojvodina League East	15	30	6	4	20	33	72	−39	22	Not qualified
2018/19.	4	Vojvodina League East	12	30	10	8	12	45	59	−14	37 (−1)	Not qualified
2019/20.	4	Vojvodina League East	12	17	6	2	9	29	37	−8	20	Not qualified
2020/21.	4	Vojvodina League East	15	32	7	6	19	44	67	−23	27	Not qualified
2021/22.	5	PFL Zrenjanin	1	28	22	2	4	71	26	+45	68	Not qualified
2022/23.	4	Vojvodina League East	12	30	11	4	15	39	54	−15	34 (−3)	Not qualified
2023/24.	4	Vojvodina League East	16	30	5	1	24	28	98	−70	16	Not qualified
2024/25.	5	PFL Zrenjanin	13	30	9	4	17	48	74	−26	31	Not qualified

== Honours ==
PFL Zrenjanin

- 2021–22 (champions)

Kikinda - Novi Bečej Municipal League

- 2013–14 (champions)

== Notable players ==
Played for the national team:

- Stevan Veselinov
- Mihalj Keri
- Božidar Sandić
