= Bočar =

Bočar Бочар (Serbian) Bocsár (Hungarian)
- Village (Selo)
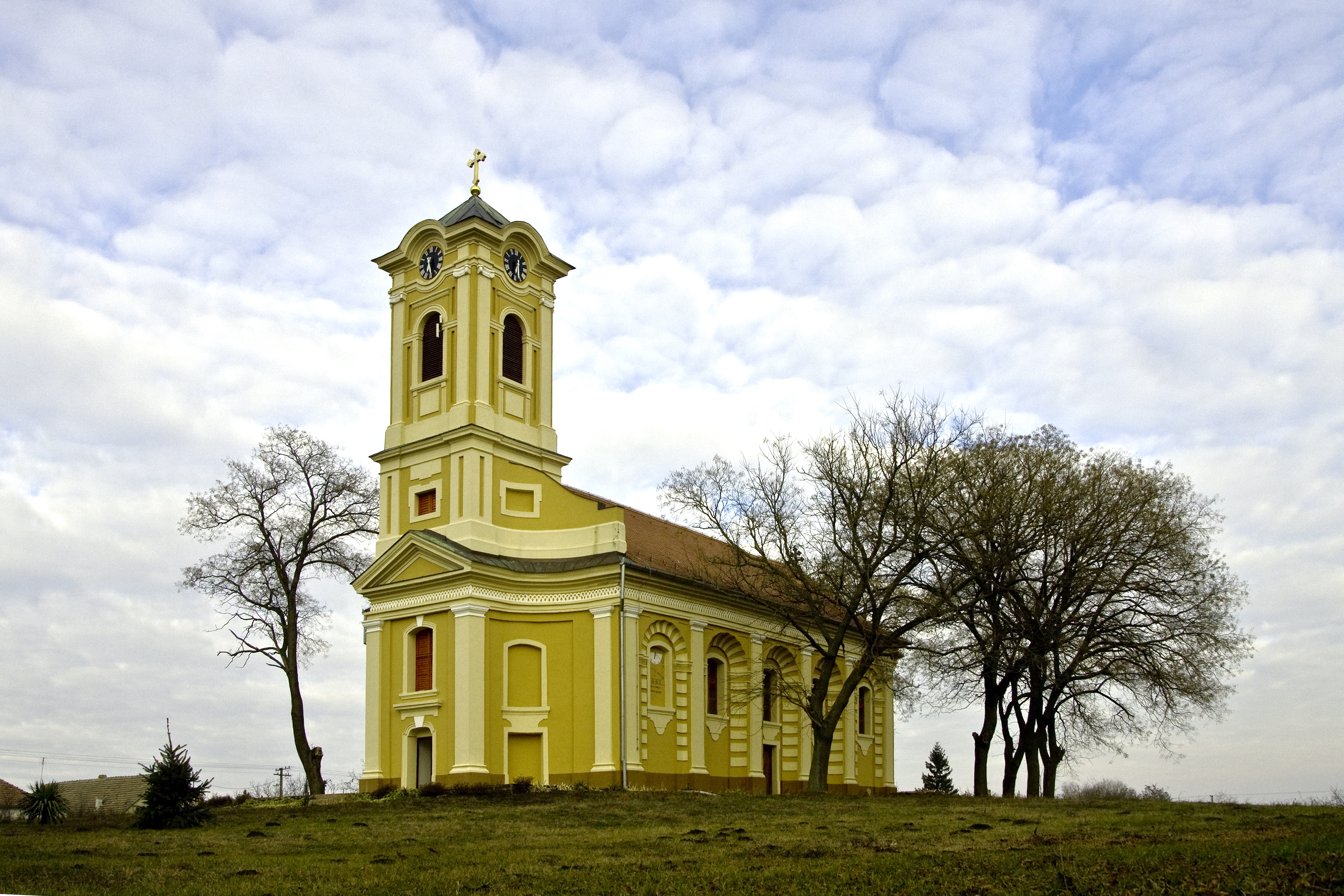
- Orthodox Church of the Holy Archangel Gabriel

- Location of Bočar within Serbia Bočar (Serbia) Bočar (Europe)
- Coordinates: 45°46′10″N 20°16′34″E
- Country: Serbia
- Province: Vojvodina
- District: Central Banat
- Municipalities: Novi Bečej
- Elevation: 81 m (266 ft)

Population (2002)
  - Bočar: 1,895
- Time zone: UTC+1 (CET)
  - Summer (DST): UTC+2 (CEST)
- Postal code: 23274
- Area code: +381(0)23
- Car plates: ZR

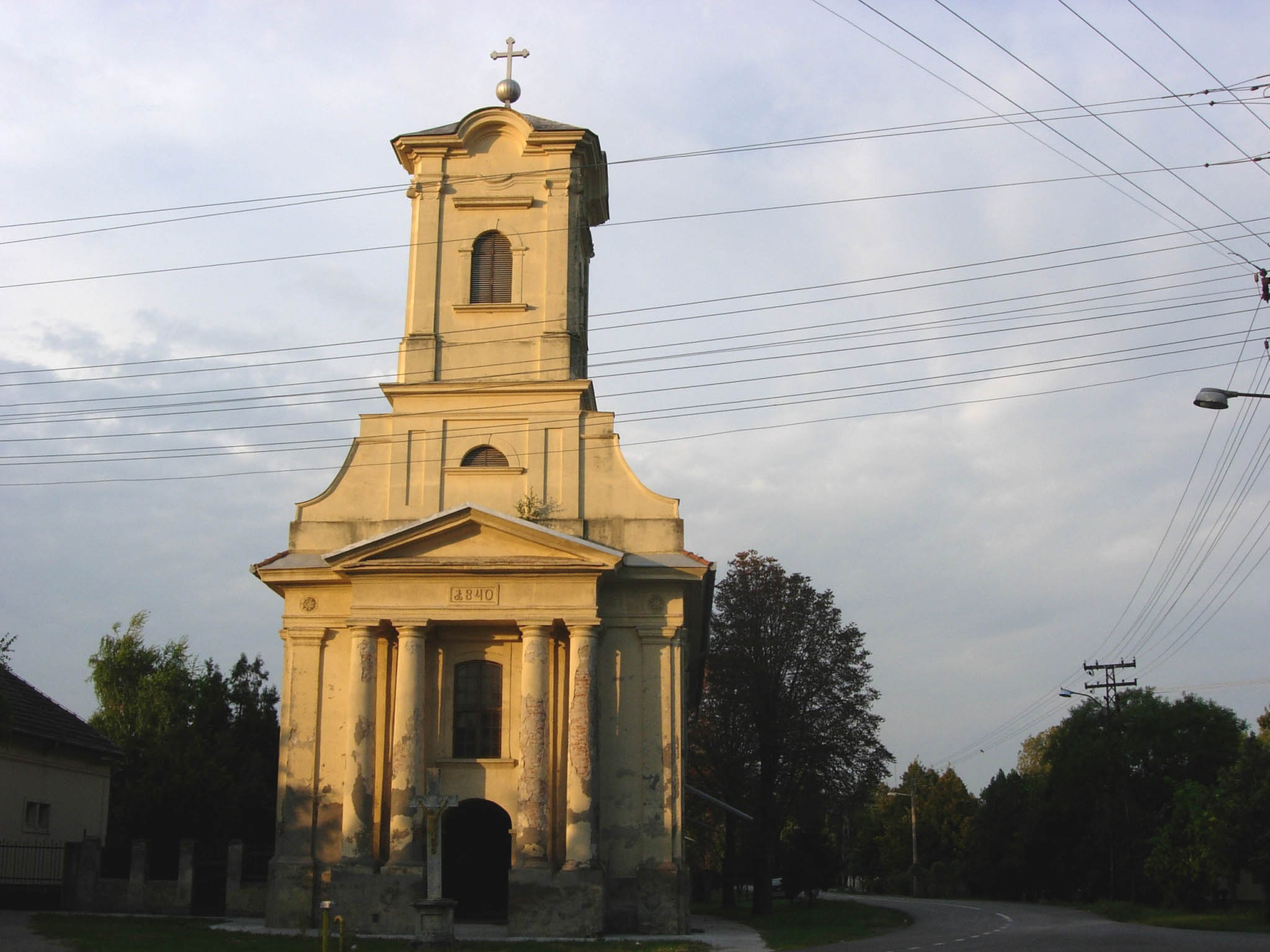
The Saint Catharina of Alexandria Virgin and Martyr Catholic Church

Bočar (Serbian Cyrillic: Бочар) is a village located in the Novi Bečej municipality, in the Central Banat District of Serbia. It is situated in the Autonomous Province of Vojvodina. The village has a Serb ethnic majority (80.26%) with a present Hungarian minority (11.34%) and its population numbering 1,895 people (2002 census).

== Name ==
In Serbian, the village is known as Bočar (Бочар), in Hungarian as Bocsár, and in German as Botschar.

== Historical population ==
- 1961: 2,620
- 1971: 2,328
- 1981: 2,095
- 1991: 2,007
- 2002: 1,895

== See also ==
- List of places in Serbia
- List of cities, towns and villages in Vojvodina
