= Banatski Dvor =

Banatski Dvor Банатски Двор (Serbian) Törzsudvarnok (Hungarian)
- Village (Selo)
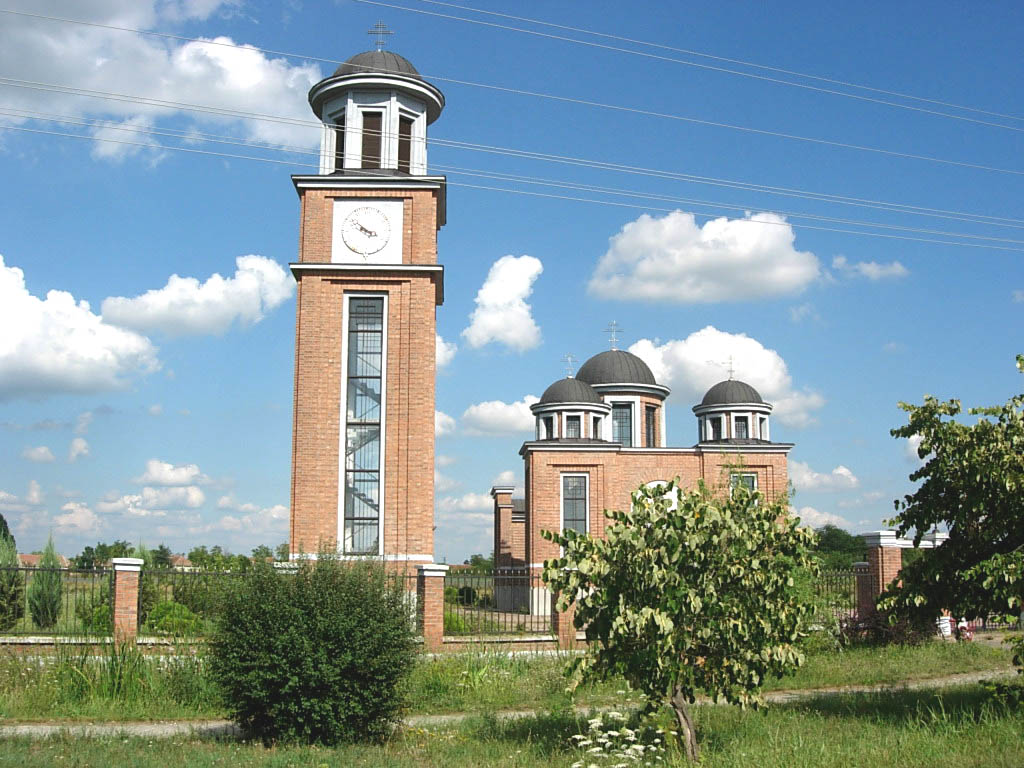
- The new Orthodox Church

- Location within Serbia Banatski Dvor (Serbia) Banatski Dvor (Europe)
- Coordinates: 45°31′08″N 20°30′31″E
- Country: Serbia
- Province: Vojvodina
- District: Central Banat
- Municipalities: Žitište
- Elevation: 68 m (223 ft)

Population (2011)
  - Banatski Dvor: 1,122
- Time zone: UTC+1 (CET)
  - Summer (DST): UTC+2 (CEST)
- Postal code: 23213
- Area code: +381(0)23
- Car plates: ZR

Banatski Dvor (Serbian Cyrillic: Банатски Двор; Hungarian: Törzsudvarnok) is a village in Serbia. It is situated in the Žitište municipality, in the Central Banat District, Vojvodina province. The village is ethnically mixed and its population numbering 1,263 people (2002 census), including 593 Serbs (46.95%), 509 Hungarians (40.30%), and others.

== Name ==
In Serbian the village is known as Banatski Dvor (Банатски Двор), in Hungarian as Udvarnok (also Törzsudvarnok before 1867, Szőllősudvarnok after 1867, Idvarnok, Itvarnok), and in German as Banater Hof und Rogendorf.

== Historical population ==
- 1961: 1,832
- 1971: 1,629
- 1981: 1,374
- 1991: 1,300
- 2001: 1,512
- 2011: 1,122

== Gas depot ==
There is a large underground gas depot at Banatski Dvor, which will be connected to the proposed South Stream transit gas pipeline.

== Gallery ==
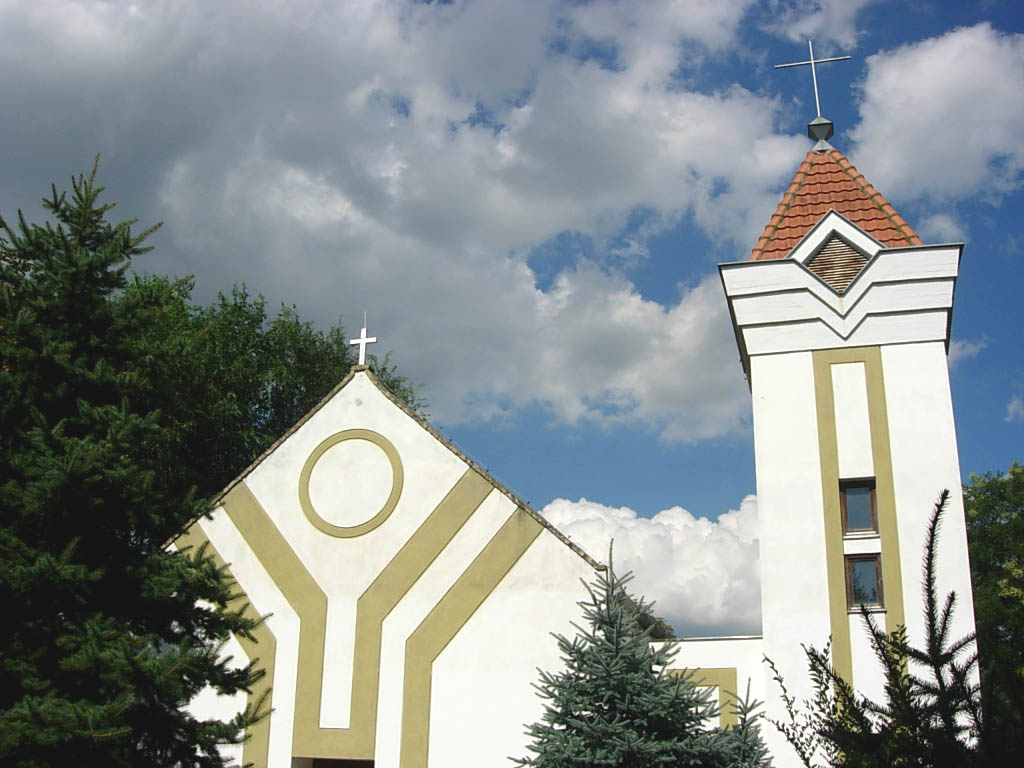
Saint Rosalia the Virgin Catholic Church.

== See also ==
- List of places in Serbia
- List of cities, towns and villages in Serbia
