= Ravni Topolovac =

Ravni Topolovac Равни Тополовац (Serbian)
- Village (Selo)
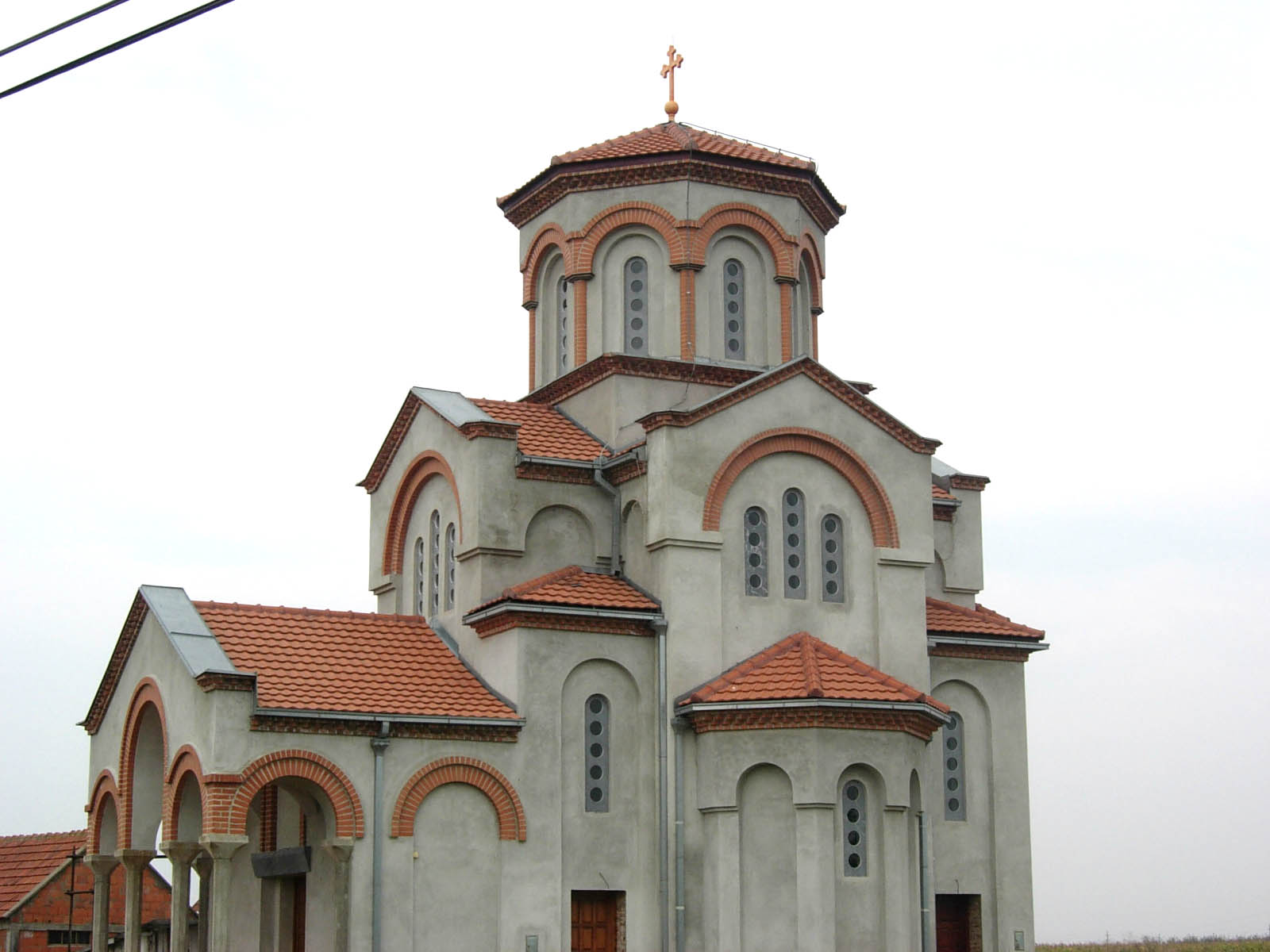
- The new Orthodox Church

- Location within Serbia Ravni Topolovac (Serbia) Ravni Topolovac (Europe)
- Coordinates: 45°27′19″N 20°34′05″E
- Country: Serbia
- Province: Vojvodina
- District: Central Banat
- Municipalities: Žitište
- Elevation: 69 m (226 ft)

Population (2002)
  - Ravni Topolovac: 1,352
- Time zone: UTC+1 (CET)
  - Summer (DST): UTC+2 (CEST)
- Postal code: 23212
- Area code: +381(0)23
- Car plates: ZR

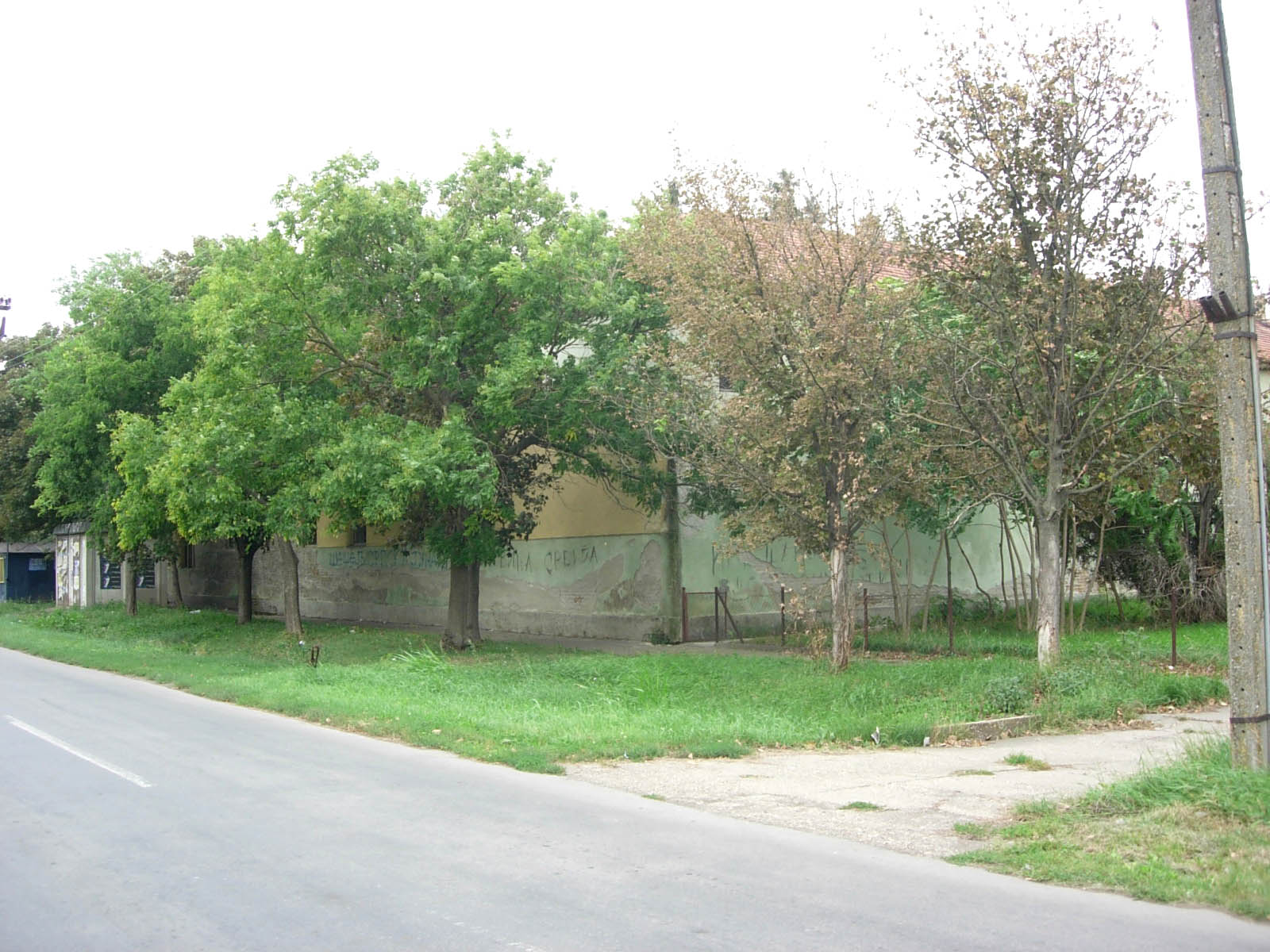
Building in the village.

Ravni Topolovac (Serbian Cyrillic: Равни Тополовац; Hungarian: Katalinfalva) is a village in Serbia. It is situated in the Žitište municipality, Central Banat District, Vojvodina province. The village has a Serb ethnic majority (88.09%) and its population numbering 1,352 people (2002 census).

== Historical names ==
Some sources say that the first mention of the village called Topolovac dating from the seventeenth century. As stated, it was a settlement with predominantly Serbian population. In the area around Bečkerek, Lugosi and Timișoara there were more settlements under this name. For Hungary maps relating to the sixteenth, seventeenth and eighteenth century we find several villages under this name. Thus, the name transferred to more moves in the Banat villages along the river Tamis (Secanj, Šarca, Catherine). After World War II, the new settlers were given by Catherine the name of the settlement flat Topolovac.

The village belongs to the area now called the Middle Banat (I swear district, Torontalska County, Bečkerečki district, Tamiš Banat, Timișoara Banat, Tamiš district, Central district) in north latitude 45° 26 'and east longitude 20° 35'. Altitude resorts and Atari flat Topolovac range of 79 to

- 1794–853 Katarinafeld (Katharinafeld)
- 1854–1864 Katarinenfeld(Katharinenfeld)
- 1864–1878 Katarinfeld (Katharinfeld)
- 1878–1918 Katalinfalva (Katarinfalva)
- 1918–1920 Katarina
- 1920–1922 Katarinovac
- 1922–1941 Katarina
- 1941–1944 Kathreinfeld
- 1944–1947 Katarina (Tolbuhinovo)
- 1947–1948 Topolovac
- 1948–1949 Banatski Topolovac
- 1949–today Ravni Topolovac

== Historical population ==
- 1948: 2454
- 1953: 2086
- 1961: 2096
- 1971: 1817
- 1981: 1656
- 1991: 1445
- 2002: 1352

== See also ==
- List of places in Serbia
- List of cities, towns and villages in Vojvodina
