= Banatsko Karađorđevo =

Banatsko Karađorđevo Банатско Карађорђево (Serbian)
- Village (Selo)
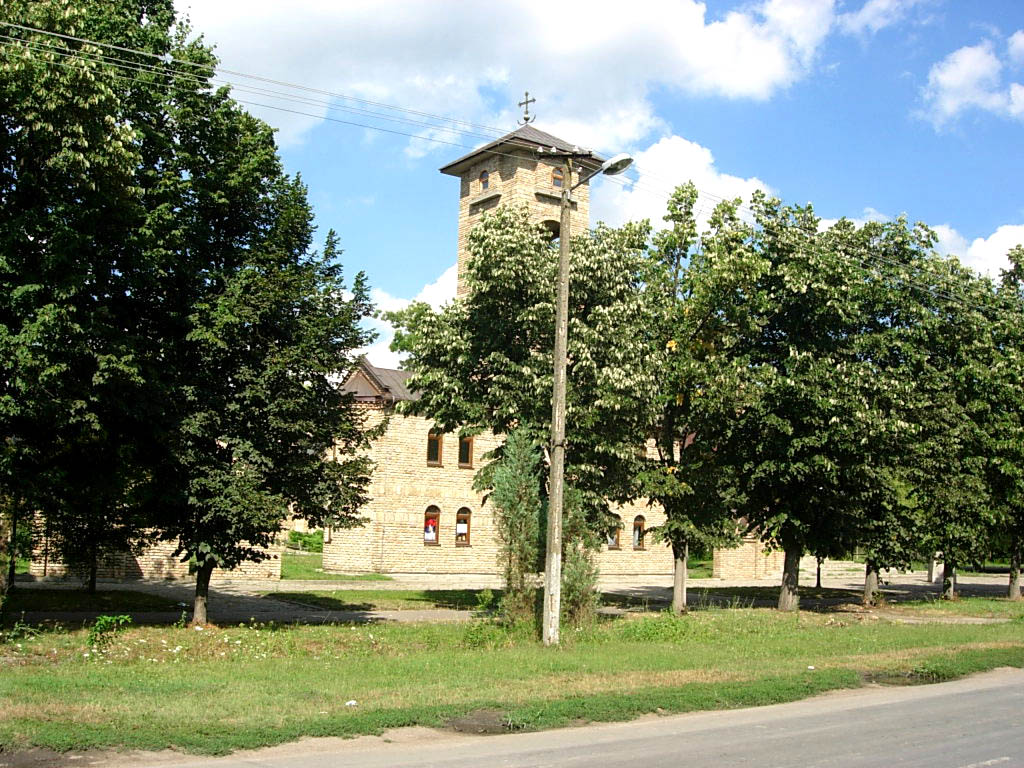
- The Orthodox Church

- Location within Serbia Banatsko Karađorđevo (Serbia) Banatsko Karađorđevo (Europe)
- Coordinates: 45°34′00″N 20°33′28″E
- Country: Serbia
- Province: Vojvodina
- District: Central Banat
- Municipalities: Žitište
- Elevation: 74 m (243 ft)

Population (2002)
  - Banatsko Karađorđevo: 4,300
- Time zone: UTC+1 (CET)
  - Summer (DST): UTC+2 (CEST)
- Postal code: 23216
- Area code: +381(0)23
- Car plates: ZR

Banatsko Karađorđevo (Serbian Cyrillic: Банатско Карађорђево; Hungarian: Pálmajor) is a village in Serbia. It is situated in the Žitište municipality, Central Banat District, Vojvodina province. The population of the village numbering 2,508 people (2002 census), of whom 2,398 (95.61%) are ethnic Serbs.

== Name ==
It is named after Karađorđe, the leader of the First Serbian Uprising (the name means „the place of Karađorđe in Banat“). In Hungarian, name Pálmajor is used for the village.

== History ==
Banatsko Karađorđevo is one of the youngest settlements in Vojvodina. The construction of the settlement started in 1920 on the estate of Andrija Cekonjic, while first settlers arrived in 1921.

== Historical population ==
- 1961: 5,426
- 1971: 6,673
- 1981: 5,234
- 1991: 4,342
- 2002: 4,300

== See also ==
- List of places in Serbia
- List of cities, towns and villages in Vojvodina
