= Banatska Topola =

Banatska Topola Банатска Топола (Serbian) Töröktopolya (Hungarian)
- Village (Selo)
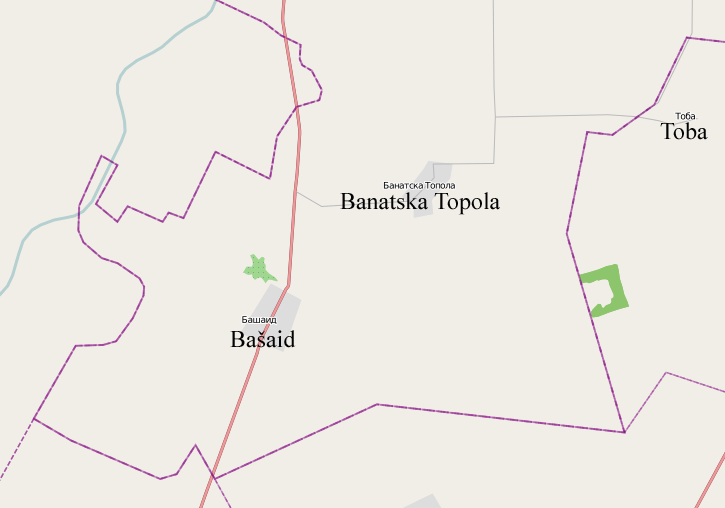
- Map of Banatska Topola and other settlements in the neighborhood

- Location of Banatska Topola within Serbia Banatska Topola (Serbia)
- Coordinates: 45°40′13″N 20°27′34″E
- Country: Serbia
- Province: Vojvodina
- Region: Banat
- District: North Banat
- Municipality: Kikinda
- Elevation: 78 m (256 ft)

Population (2002)
  - Banatska Topola: 1,066
- Time zone: UTC+1 (CET)
  - Summer (DST): UTC+2 (CEST)
- Postal code: 23315
- Area code: +381(0)230
- Car plates: KI

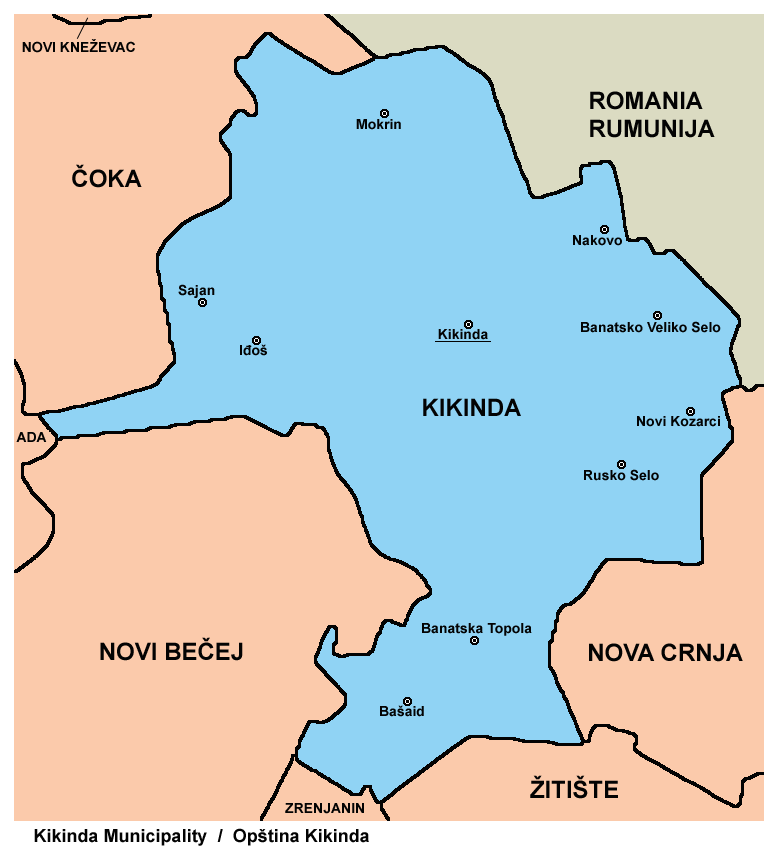
Map of Kikinda municipality, showing location of the village

Banatska Topola (Serbian Cyrillic: Банатска Топола) is a village in the Kikinda municipality, in the North Banat District of the Republic of Serbia. It is situated in the Autonomous Province of Vojvodina. The village has a population of 1,066 (2002 census) of which 570 (53.47%) are ethnic Serbs and 434 (40.71%) are ethnic Hungarians.

The location of the village is 18 kilometers south of the city of Kikinda. Administratively, the settlement named Vincaid is also classified as part of Banatska Topola.

== Name ==
In Serbian, the village is known as Банатска Топола or Banatska Topola, in Hungarian as Töröktopolya, and in German as Banat Topola.

== History ==
There are numerous archaeological findings which are pointing to human presence in this area in the late Bronze Age, around 1200 B.C. Accidental findings of Bronze Age tools are kept in the Kikinda National Museum. Other findings provide evidence of the presence of Sarmatians in later periods. During the Middle Ages there existed several settlements in the area of the present-day village. However, up to the second half of the 18th century, the land in this area was composed of wetlands and fens.

The modern village was founded during Habsburg administration in 1766 by Serb frontiersmen, but they soon abandoned the area because of the flooding. In 1781-1783, the land was bought by Count Bogdan Karácsony from neighbouring Novo Miloševo, who then started the process of drying up the wetlands. Around 1790, he founded the village in the middle of these wetlands, which he settled with German and Hungarian families.

Until 1778, the area was part of a separate Habsburg province known as the Banat of Temeswar. After the abolishment of this province, in 1778, the area was included into the Torontal County within the Habsburg Kingdom of Hungary. In 1848-1849, the village was part of autonomous Serbian Vojvodina and in 1849-1860 part of the Voivodeship of Serbia and Banat of Temeschwar, a separate Austrian crown land. It was part of the Batschka-Torontal District (1849-1850) and Großbetschkerek District (1850-1860) within the voivodeship. After the abolishment of the voivodeship in 1860, the village was again included into Torontal County. A Roman Catholic church was built in 1899. In 1910 census, main spoken language in the village was German and the second largest spoken language was Hungarian.

In 1918, the village firstly became part of the Banat Republic, then (as part of the Banat, Bačka and Baranja region) part of the Kingdom of Serbia and finally part of the Kingdom of Serbs, Croats and Slovenes (later renamed to Yugoslavia). In 1918-1919, the village was part of the Banat, Bačka and Baranja region and also (from 1918 to 1922) part of the Veliki Bečkerek district. From 1922 to 1929, the village was part of the Belgrade Oblast and from 1929 to 1941 part of the Danube Banovina. According to 1931 data, main spoken language in the village was Hungarian and the second largest spoken language was German.

From 1941 to 1944, the village was under Axis occupation and was part of the Banat autonomous region within German-occupied Serbia. Since 1944, the village is part of autonomous Yugoslav Vojvodina, which (from 1945) was part of new socialist Serbia within Yugoslavia.

In 1944, as a consequence of World War II events in Yugoslavia, one part of Yugoslav citizens of German ethnicity left from the area, together with defeated German army. Those who remained in the area were sent to communist prison camps. After prison camps were dissolved (in 1948), most of the remaining German population left Yugoslavia in subsequent decades, mainly because of economic reasons. After World War II (in 1946), some (mainly ethnic Serb) families from Bosnia and Herzegovina settled in the village. Post-WW2 population censuses recorded Hungarian ethnic majority in the village. Since 1971 census, the village have a Serb majority.

== Historical population ==
- 1948: 1,255
- 1953: 1,029
- 1961: 1,101
- 1971: 1,848
- 1981: 1,463
- 1991: 1,176
- 2002: 1,066

== Gallery ==
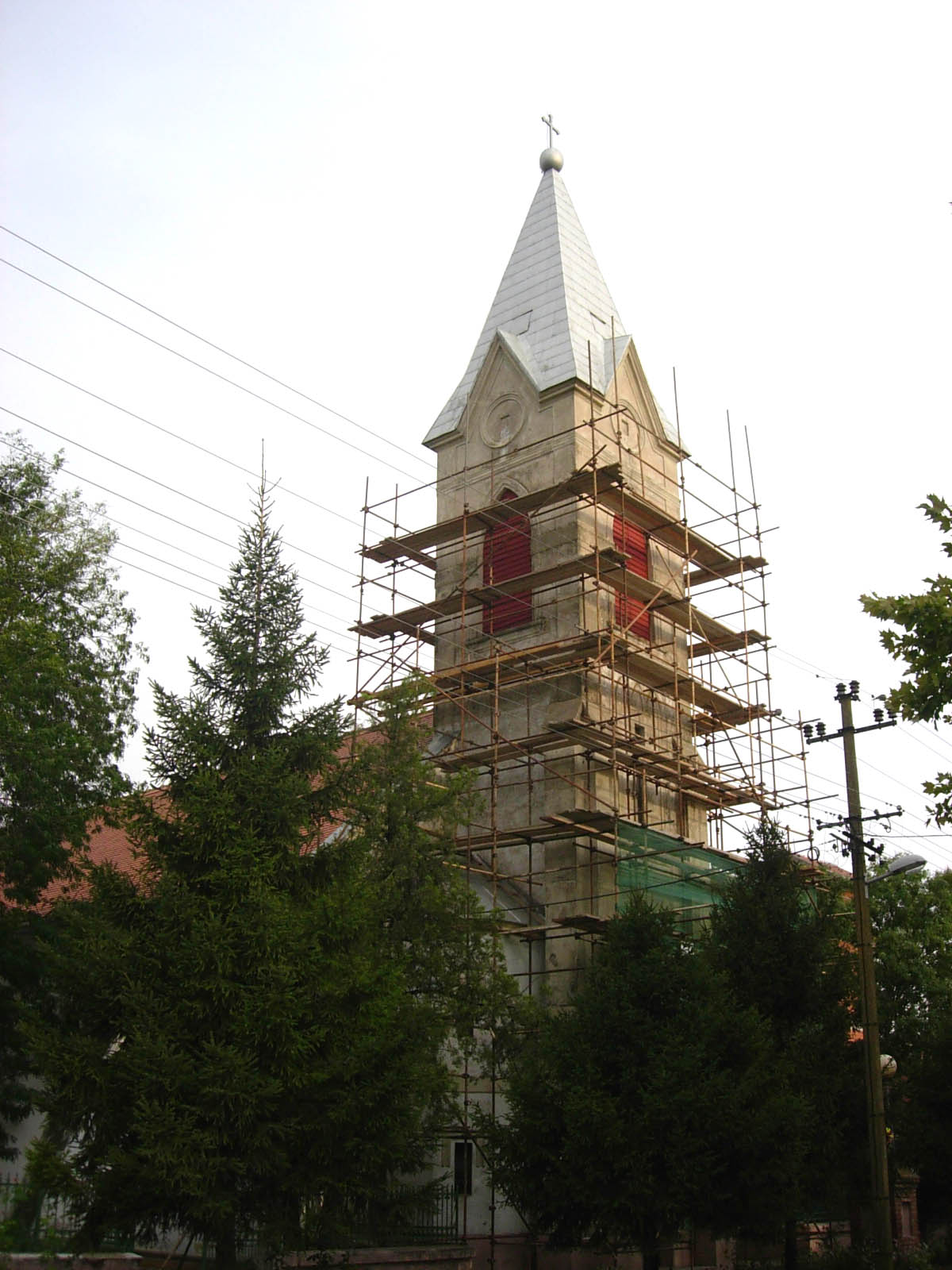
The Ascension of Blessed Virgin Mary Catholic Church under reconstruction

== See also ==
- List of places in Serbia
- List of cities, towns and villages in Vojvodina
