= Srpski Itebej =

Srpski Itebej Српски Итебеј (Serbian) Szerbittabé (Hungarian)
- Village (Selo)
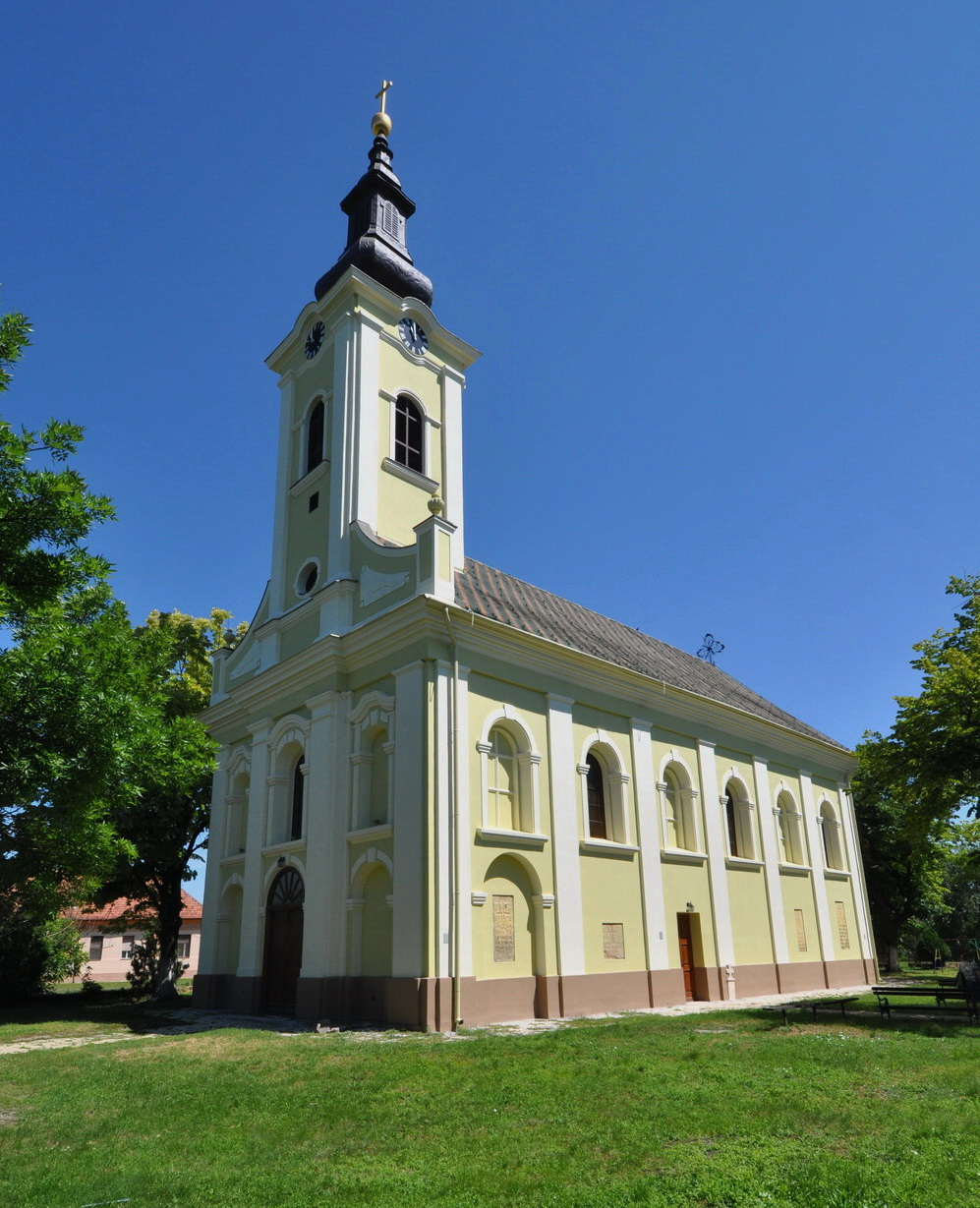
- The Orthodox Church of Saint Sava

- Location within Serbia Srpski Itebej (Serbia) Srpski Itebej (Europe)
- Coordinates: 45°34′07″N 20°42′29″E
- Country: Serbia
- Province: Vojvodina
- District: Central Banat
- Municipalities: Žitište
- Elevation: 70 m (230 ft)

Population (2002)
  - Srpski Itebej: 2,405
- Time zone: UTC+1 (CET)
  - Summer (DST): UTC+2 (CEST)
- Postal code: 23233
- Area code: +381(0)23
- Car plates: ZR

Srpski Itebej (Serbian Cyrillic: Српски Итебеј; Hungarian: Szerbittabé) is a village in Serbia. It is situated in the Žitište municipality, Central Banat District, Vojvodina province. The village has a Serb ethnic majority (78.21%) and a Hungarian minority (10.60%), with a population of 2,405 (2002 census).

== Historical population ==
- 1961: 4,634
- 1971: 4,058
- 1981: 3,281
- 1991: 2,873

== Gallery ==
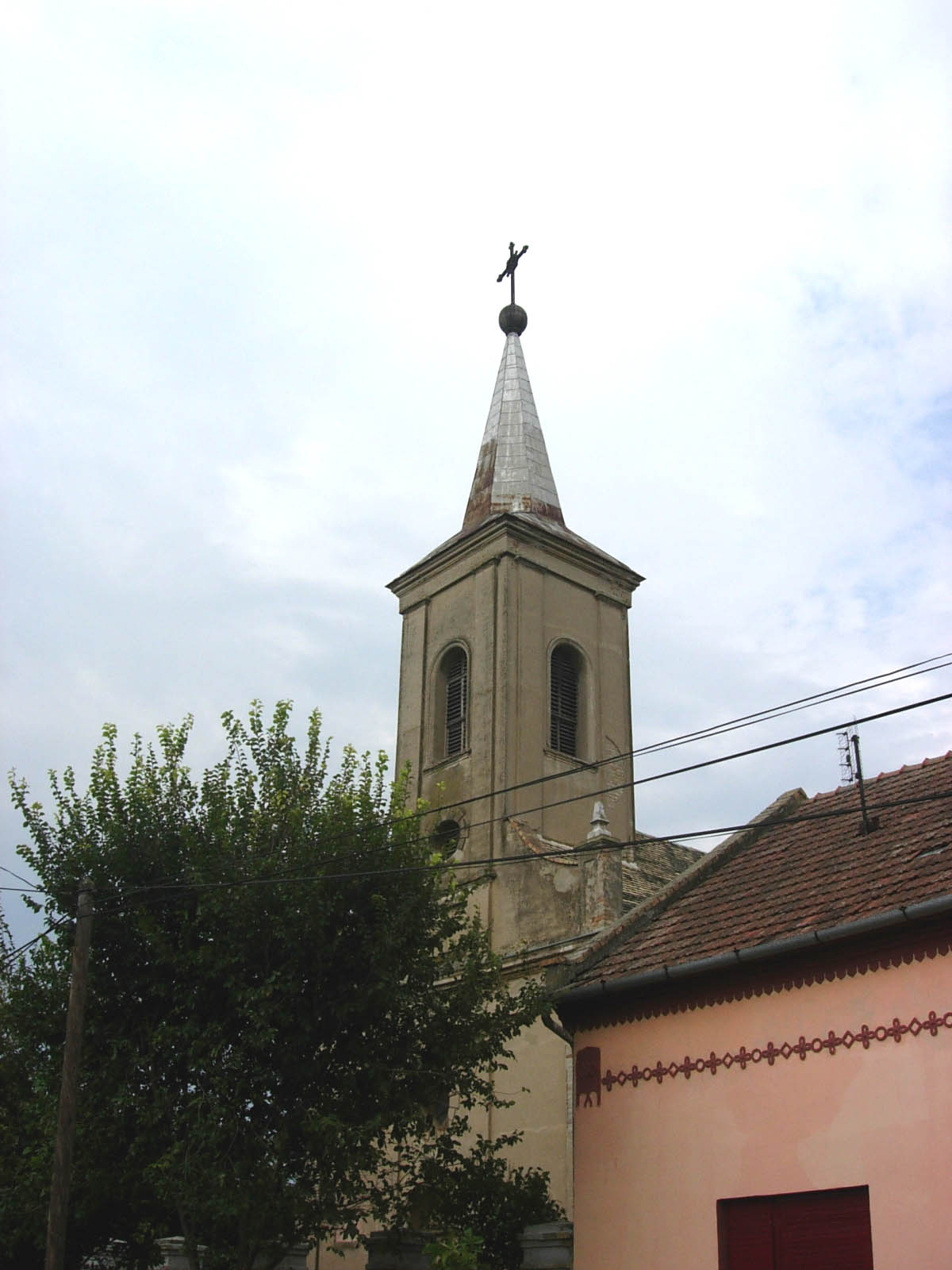
The Blessed Virgin Mary Deliverer of slaves Catholic church.

== See also ==
- List of places in Serbia
- List of cities, towns and villages in Vojvodina
