= Novi Itebej =

Novi Itebej Нови Итебеј (Serbian) Magyarittabé (Hungarian)
- Village (Selo)
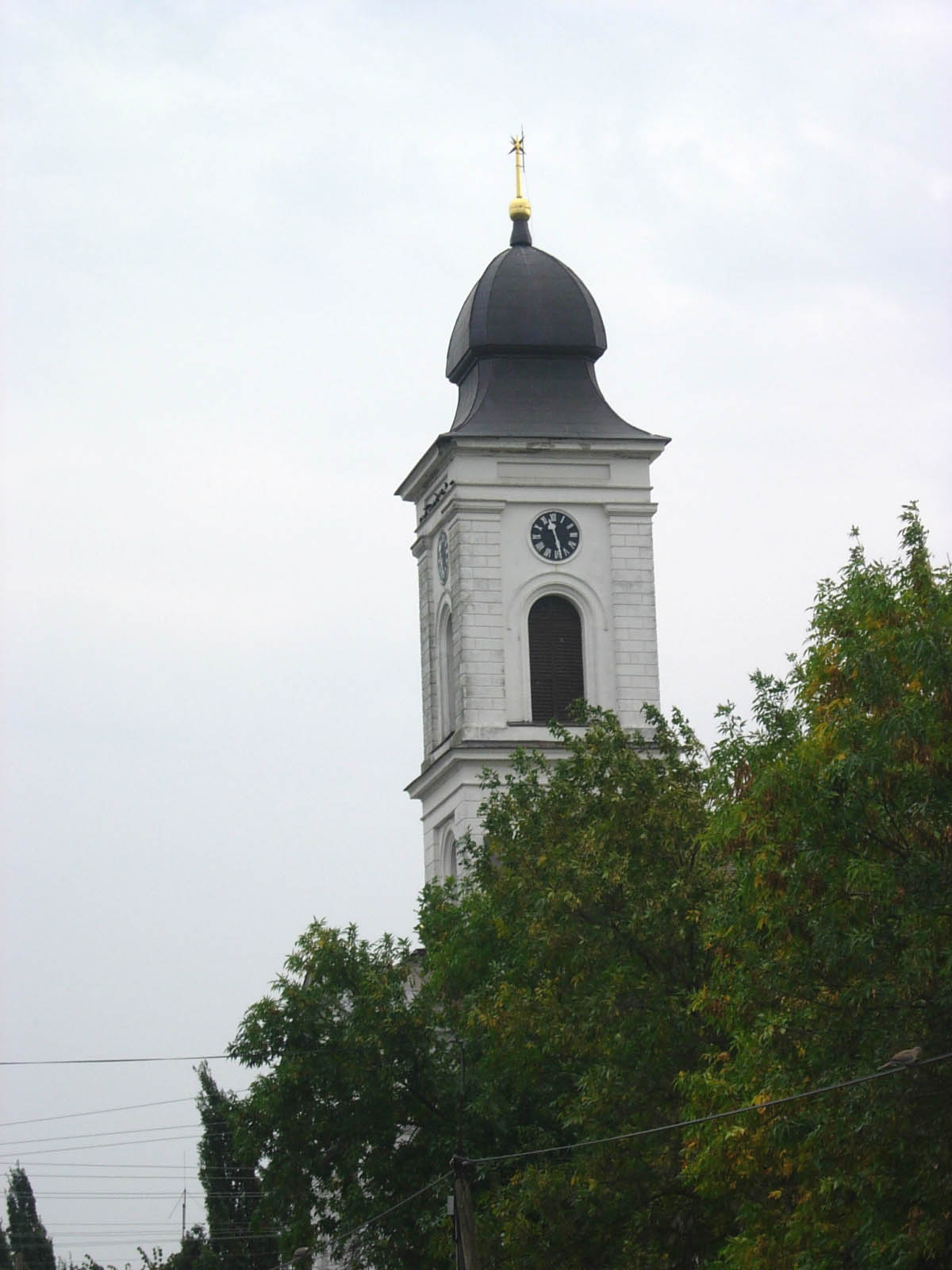
- The Calvinist Church

- Location within Serbia Novi Itebej (Serbia) Novi Itebej (Europe)
- Coordinates: 45°33′20″N 20°41′24″E
- Country: Serbia
- Province: Vojvodina
- District: Central Banat
- Municipalities: Žitište
- Elevation: 77 m (253 ft)

Population (2002)
  - Novi Itebej: 1,315
- Time zone: UTC+1 (CET)
  - Summer (DST): UTC+2 (CEST)
- Postal code: 23236
- Area code: +381(0)23
- Car plates: ZR

Novi Itebej (Serbian Cyrillic: Нови Итебеј, Hungarian: Magyarittabé, German: Neu Itebe) is a village in Serbia. It is situated in the Žitište municipality, in the Central Banat District, Vojvodina province. The village has a Hungarian ethnic majority (81.90%) of Protestant religious affiliation and its population numbering 1,315 people (2002 census).

== Demographics ==
=== Historical population ===
- 1961: 1,868
- 1971: 1,750
- 1981: 1,553
- 1991: 1,521
- 2002: 1,315
- 2022: 893

=== Ethnic groups ===
According to data from the 2022 census, ethnic groups in the village include:

- 635 (71.1%) Hungarians
- 126 (14.1%) Serbs
- Others/Undeclared/Unknown

== See also ==
- List of places in Serbia
- List of cities, towns and villages in Vojvodina
