= Bašaid =

Bašaid Башаид (Serbian)
- Village (Selo)
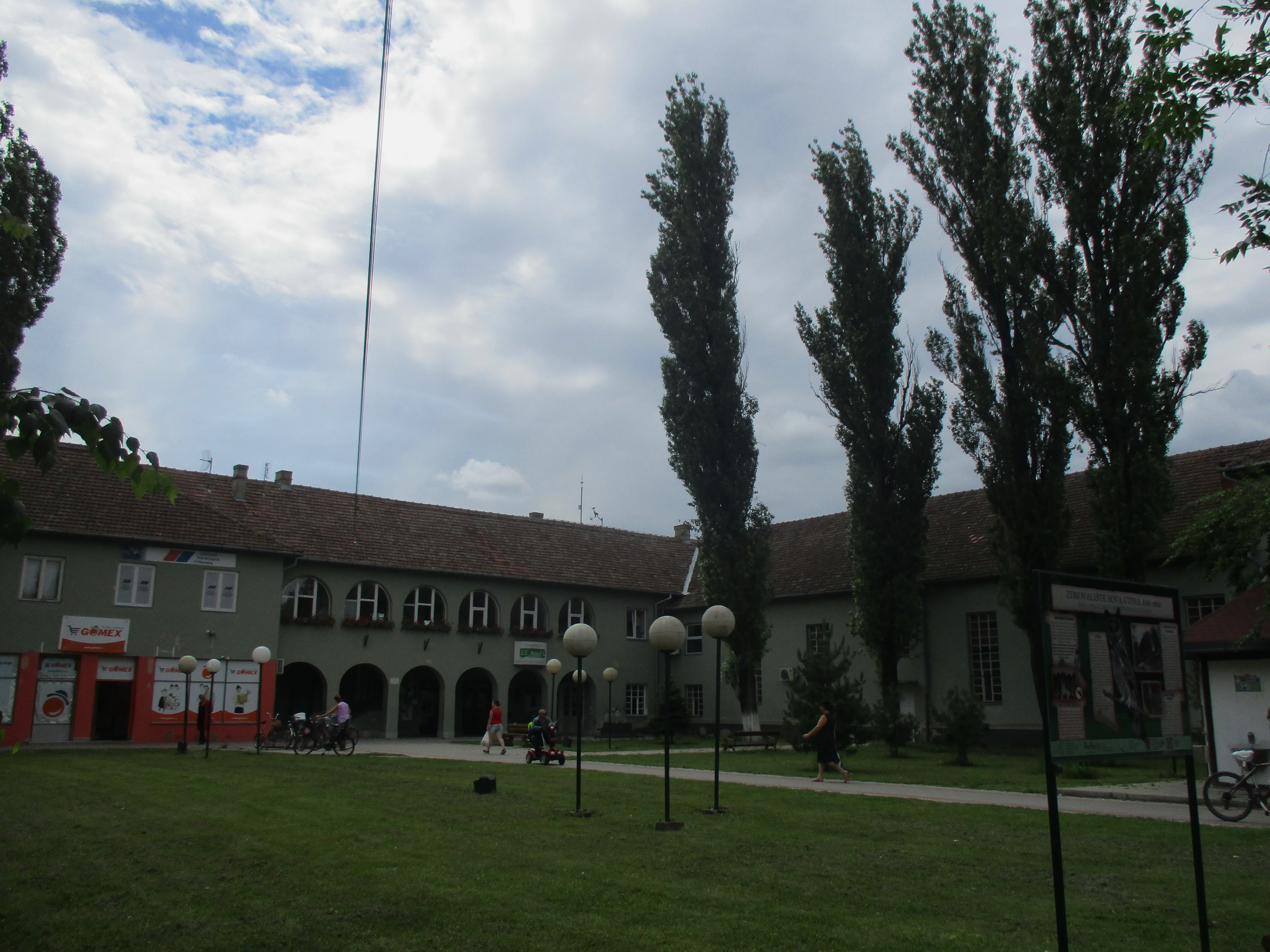
- Park in the village center

- Location of Bašaid within Serbia Bašaid (Serbia) Bašaid (Europe)
- Coordinates: 45°38′17″N 20°24′31″E
- Country: Serbia
- Province: Vojvodina
- Region: Banat
- District: North Banat
- Municipality: Kikinda
- Elevation: 71 m (233 ft)

Population (2002)
  - Bašaid: 3,503
- Time zone: UTC+1 (CET)
  - Summer (DST): UTC+2 (CEST)
- Postal code: 23316
- Area code: +381(0)230
- Car plates: KI

Bašaid (Serbian Cyrillic: Башаид) is a village located in the Kikinda municipality, in the North Banat District of the Republic of Serbia. It is situated in the Autonomous Province of Vojvodina. The village has an ethnic Serb majority (89.15%) and a population of 3,503 (2002 census). Administratively, the settlement of Bikač is also classified as part of Bašaid.

== Ethnic groups (2002 census) ==
- Serbs = 3,123 (89.15%)
- Romani = 179 (5.11%)
- Hungarians = 100 (2.86%)
- Yugoslavs = 23 (0.66%)
- Macedonians = 12 (0.34%)
- others.

== Historical population ==
- 1961: 4,367
- 1971: 3,982
- 1981: 3,864
- 1991: 3,741
- 2002: 3,503

== See also ==
- List of places in Serbia
- List of cities, towns and villages in Vojvodina
- Bikač
