= Čestereg =

Čestereg Честерег (Serbian)
- Village (Selo)
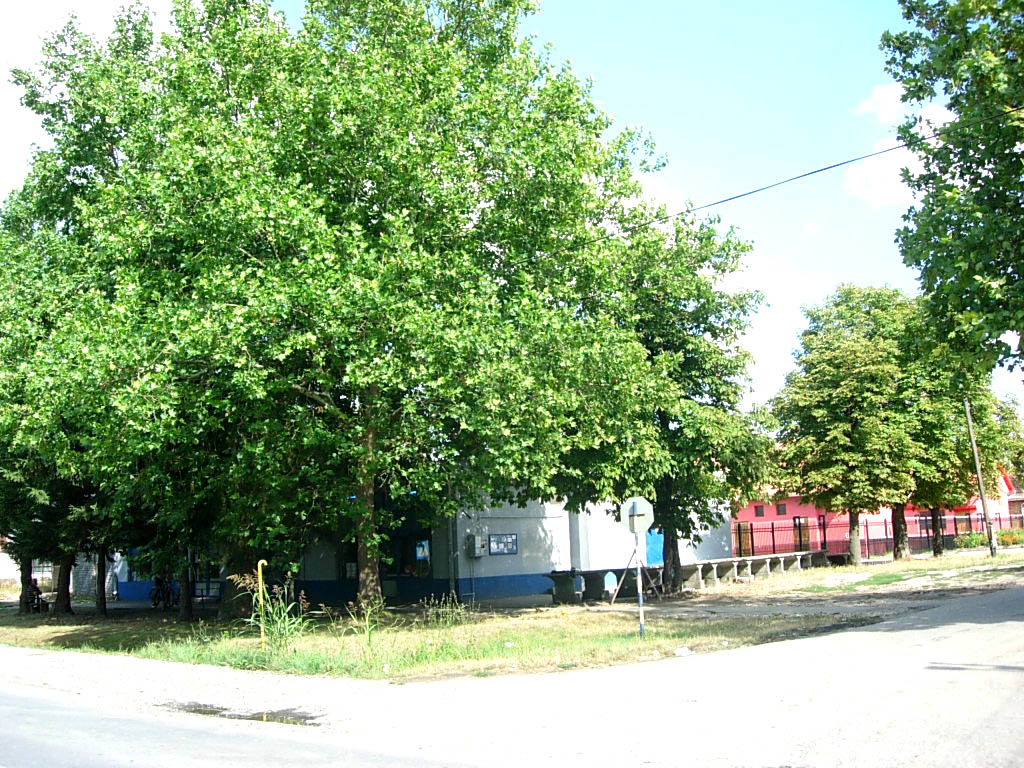
- Market place in the village

- Location within Serbia Čestereg (Serbia) Čestereg (Europe)
- Coordinates: 45°33′29″N 20°31′33″E
- Country: Serbia
- Province: Vojvodina
- District: Central Banat
- Municipalities: Žitište
- Elevation: 83 m (272 ft)

Population (2002)
  - Čestereg: 1,391
- Time zone: UTC+1 (CET)
  - Summer (DST): UTC+2 (CEST)
- Postal code: 23215
- Area code: +381(0)23
- Car plates: ZR

Čestereg (Serbian Cyrillic: Честерег; Hungarian: Csősztelek) is a village in Serbia. It is situated in the Žitište municipality, Central Banat District, Vojvodina province. The village has a Serb ethnic majority and its population numbering 1,391 people (2002 census).

== Name ==
In Serbian, the village is known as Честерег or Čestereg, in Hungarian as Csősztelek, in German as Tschesterek or Neuhatzfeld, and in Croatian as Čestereg.

== History ==
The village was first mentioned in 1332 as Cherezek. During the Ottoman invasion it was devastated. In the 19th century, the area of present-day village belonged to Count József Csekonics (a Hungarian of Croatian descent). The modern village was founded in 1828. Its first inhabitants were Hungarians, but since they left from the village, Csekonics settled Germans in 1829. In 1900, the population of the village was composed of 2,001 Germans, 673 Hungarians, and 64 Romanians. After World War II, as a consequence of the war events, German population fled from the village and was replaced with Serb settlers from Herzegovina and Montenegro.

== Ethnic groups (2002 census) ==
- Serbs = 1,294 (93.03%)
- Romani = 27 (1.94%)
- Croats = 15 (1.08%)
- Yugoslavs = 14 (1.01%)
- Hungarians = 11 (0.79%)
- others.

== Historical population ==
- 1836: 1,213
- 1900: 2,767
- 1961: 2,101
- 1971: 1,766
- 1981: 1,581
- 1991: 1,465
- 2002: 1,391

== See also ==
- List of places in Serbia
- List of cities, towns and villages in Vojvodina

== Pictures Gallery ==
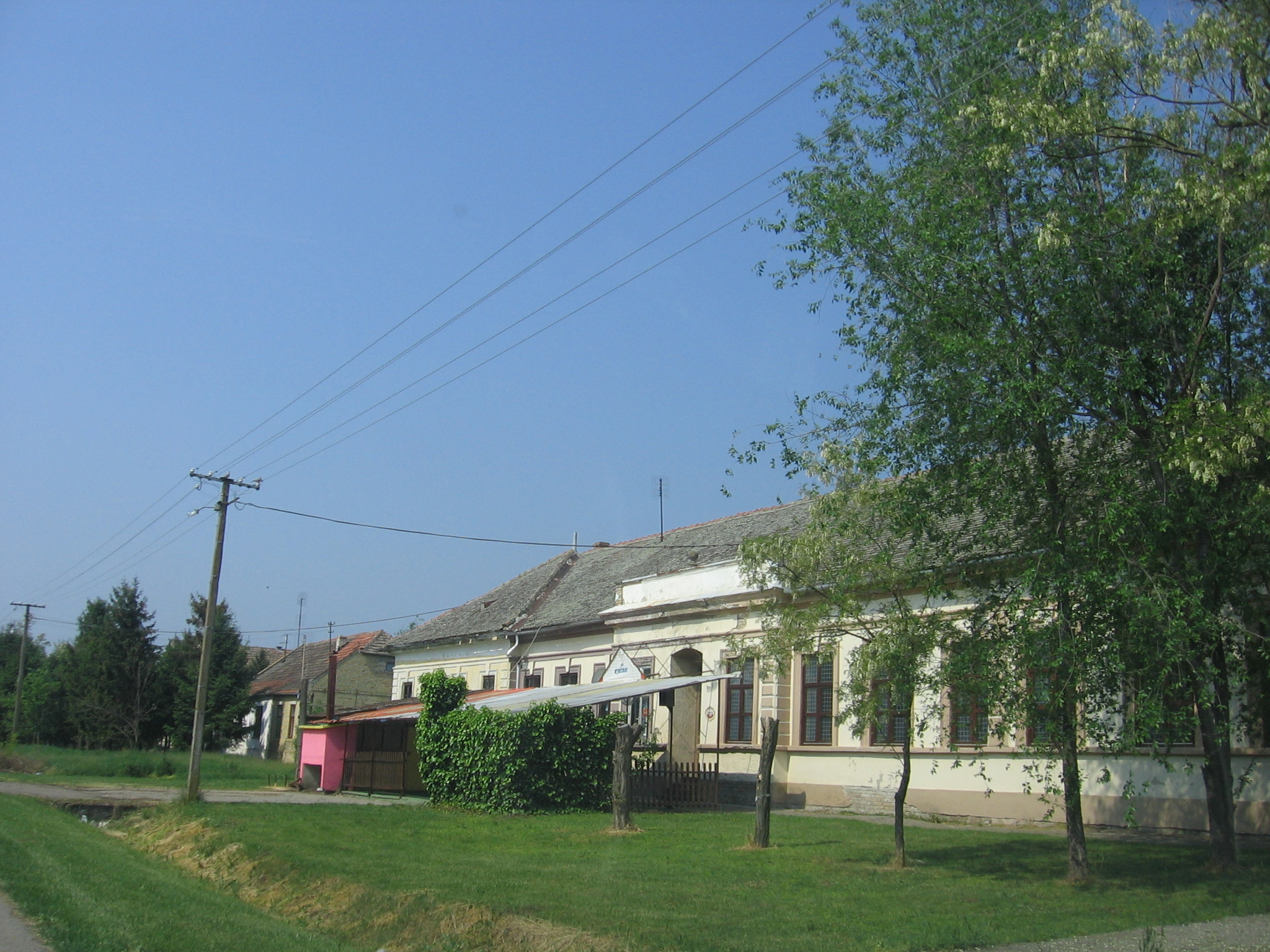
Old school in Čestereg

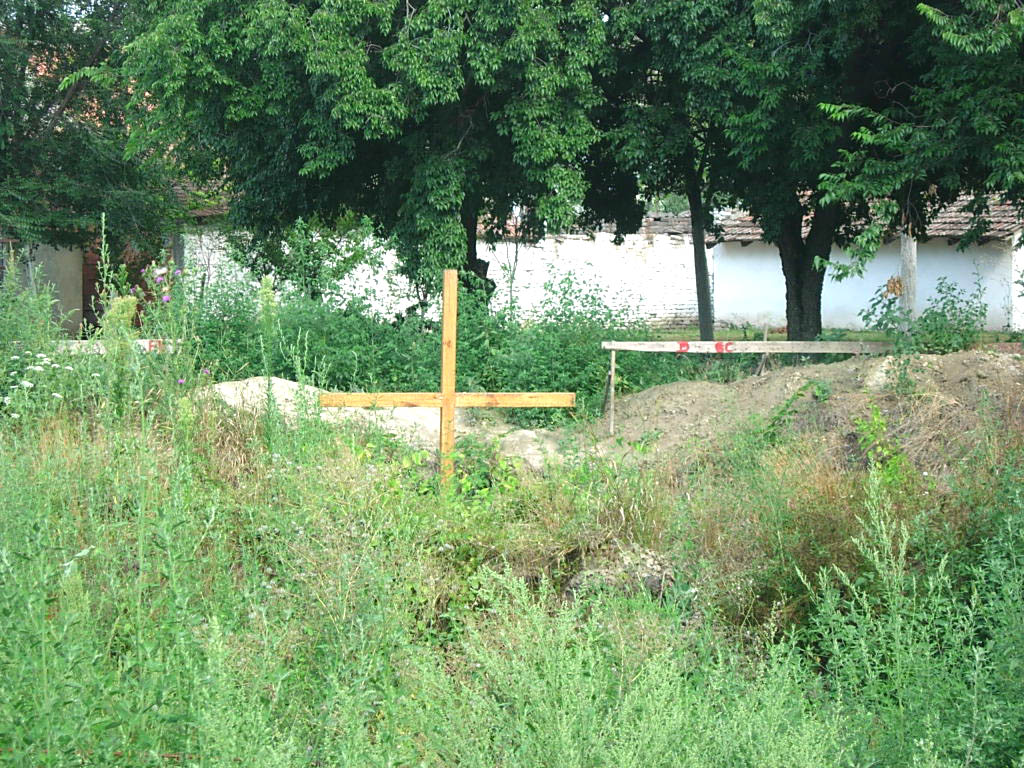
The foundations of the new Serbian Orthodox Church of Saint Elijah

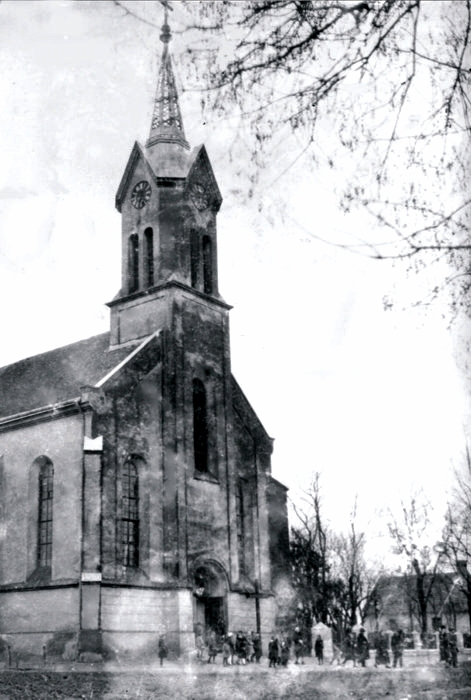
Old Catholic church of John of Nepomuk built in 1880, destroyed by Communists in 1948
