= Žitište =

Žitište Житиште (Serbian) Begaszentgyörgy (Hungarian) Jitiște (Romanian)
- Town and municipality
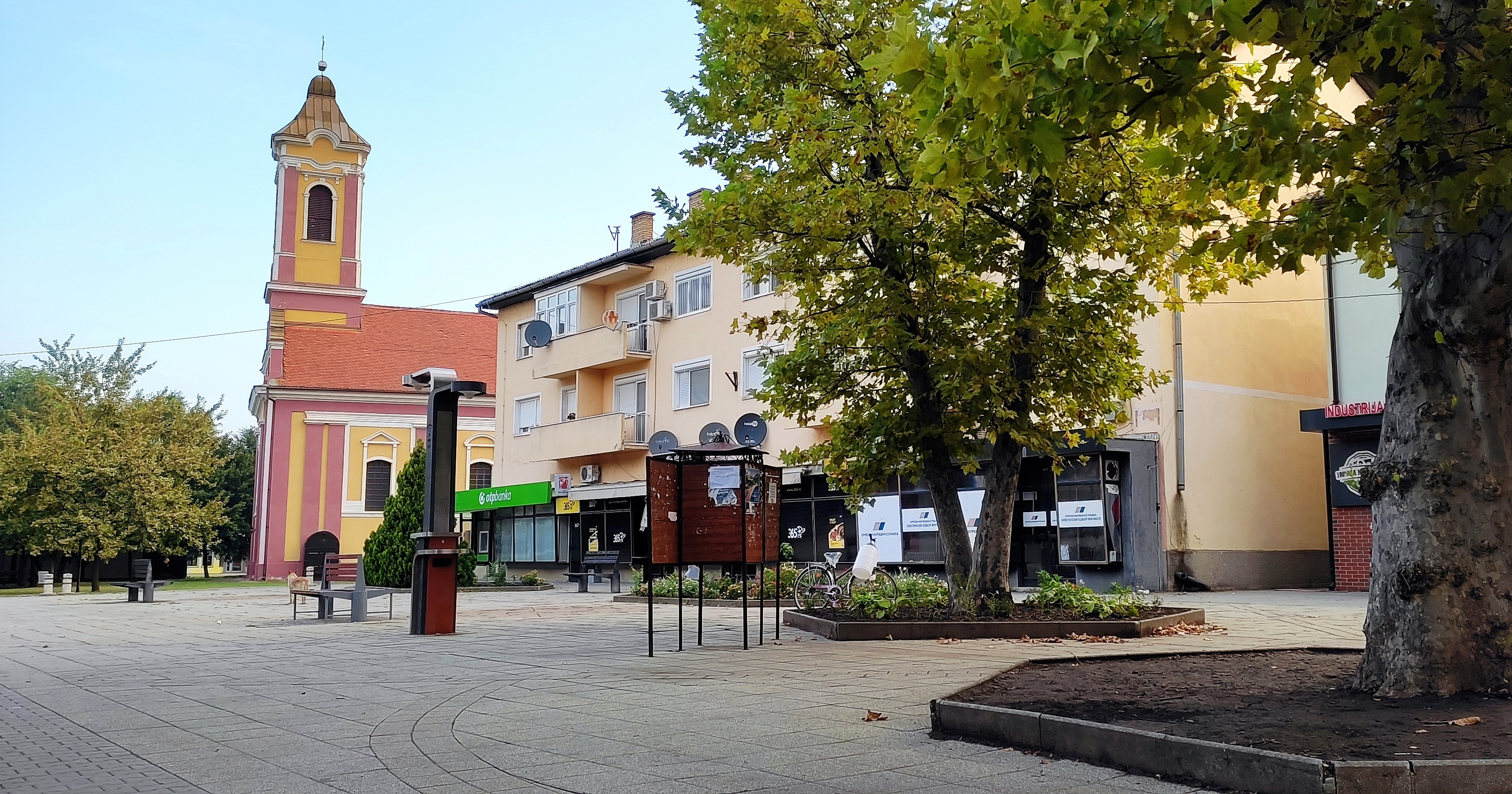
- Town center.

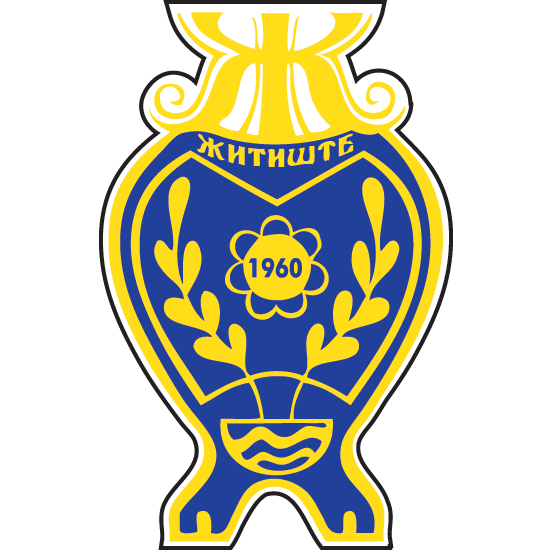
- Coat of arms

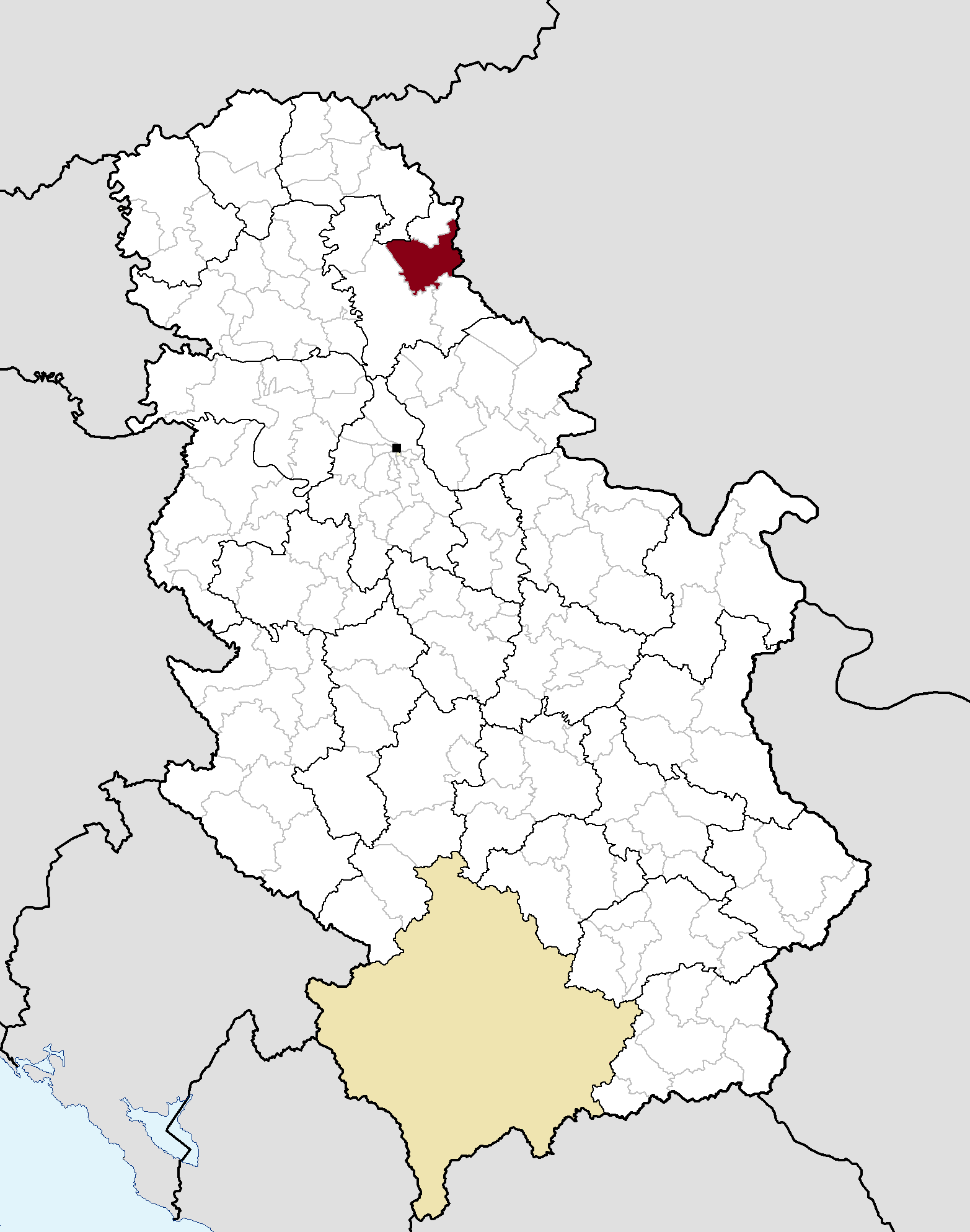
- Location of Žitište within Serbia
- Coordinates: 45°29′N 20°33′E
- Country: Serbia
- Province: Vojvodina
- District: Central Banat

Government
  - Mayor: Mitar Vučurević (SNS)

Area
  - Total: 525 km^{2} (202.7 sq mi)
- Elevation: 78 m (256 ft)

Population (2022)
  - Total: 13,412
  - Administrative: 2,550
- Time zone: UTC+1 (CET)
  - Summer (DST): UTC+2 (CEST)
- Postal code: 23210
- Area code: +381(0)23
- Car plates: ZR
- Official languages: Serbian together with Hunagrian and Romanian
- Website: zitiste.org

Žitište (Serbian Cyrillic: Житиште, pronounced [ʒîtiːʃte]; Hungarian: Begaszentgyörgy; Romanian: Jitiște) is a town and municipality located in the Central Banat District of the autonomous province of Vojvodina, Serbia. As of 2022 census, the town itself has a population of 2,550, while Žitište municipality has 13,412 inhabitants.

== Name ==
In Serbian, the town is known as Žitište (Cyrillic: Житиште), in Romanian as Jitiște or Zitiște, in German as Sankt Georgen an der Bega, and in Hungarian as Bégaszentgyörgy or Begaszentgyörgy.

The Serbian name of the town derived from the Serbian word "žito" ("wheat" in English). Its old names used in Serbian were Begej Sveti Đurađ and Senđurađ.

The Hungarian name of the town derived from the Hungarian family name Szentgyörgyi.

== History ==
Žitište was founded in the 14th century during the administration of the medieval Kingdom of Hungary, under the name of Zenthgyurgh (Szentgyörgyi). In 1660/1666, it was called Senđurađ, which was recorded as a settlement repopulated by ethnic Serbs during Ottoman rule. In the beginning of the 18th century, the settlement was completely abandoned and in 1723 it was recorded as an uninhabited heath.

It was settled again in 1724 by Serb and Romanian settlers. In 1736/37, the settlement had 27 houses. Because of the Austro-Turkish war (1736–1739) and pestilence, the number of inhabitants decreased and in 1740 the population of the settlement numbered 18 houses. In 1753, Begej Sveti Đurađ was settled by 1,000 Serb frontiersmen from Pomorišje, Potisje and Veliki Bečkerek, and in the same year it was recorded on map as a "Serb-inhabited settlement". In 1758, Begej Sveti Đurađ had 45 houses, and in 1773 it had 182 houses. Its church was built in 1758, and it was also used as a school. In 1781, Begej Sveti Đurađ became a property of Isak Kiš (Kis Izsák), who was a trader of Armenian origin.

From 1800 to 1805, the settlement was moved to another location closer to the Begej river. Part of the Serb population moved from the settlement and settled in the Military Frontier, while German colonists settled in Begej Sveti Đurađ instead of them. Begej Sveti Đurađ was a municipality until 1877, when it was joined to the municipality of Veliki Bečkerek. In 1880, the population of the settlement numbered 3,041 people, of whom 1,983 were Catholics, 1,033 were Eastern Orthodox, 19 were Jews, and 6 were others. In accordance with the census made in 1910, the linguistic distribution of the 2,814 inhabitants included 1,454 who spoke German, 1,034 who spoke Serbian and 214 who spoke Hungarian.

In 1931, the population of Begej Sveti Đurađ included 1,318 inhabitants who spoke the German language, 1,055 who spoke the Serbian language, 188 who spoke the Hungarian language, 34 who spoke other Slavic languages, and 94 who spoke other languages. In 1940, population of Begej Sveti Đurađ numbered 3,055 people, of whom 1,642 were Eastern Orthodox, 1,387 were Catholics, 16 were Jews, and 10 were others.

As a consequence of World War II and Axis occupation, the German population left or was evicted from Begej Sveti Đurađ after the war, while 270 Serb families from Bosanska Krajina came to the settlement. In 1947, the name of the settlement was officially changed to Žitište. In 1960, Žitište became a seat of its municipality.

On 2 July 2016, a man killed his wife in a mass shooting that occurred at a local cafe. Four others were also killed and an additional 22 were injured. The shooter was arrested by police after the attack.

== Inhabited places ==
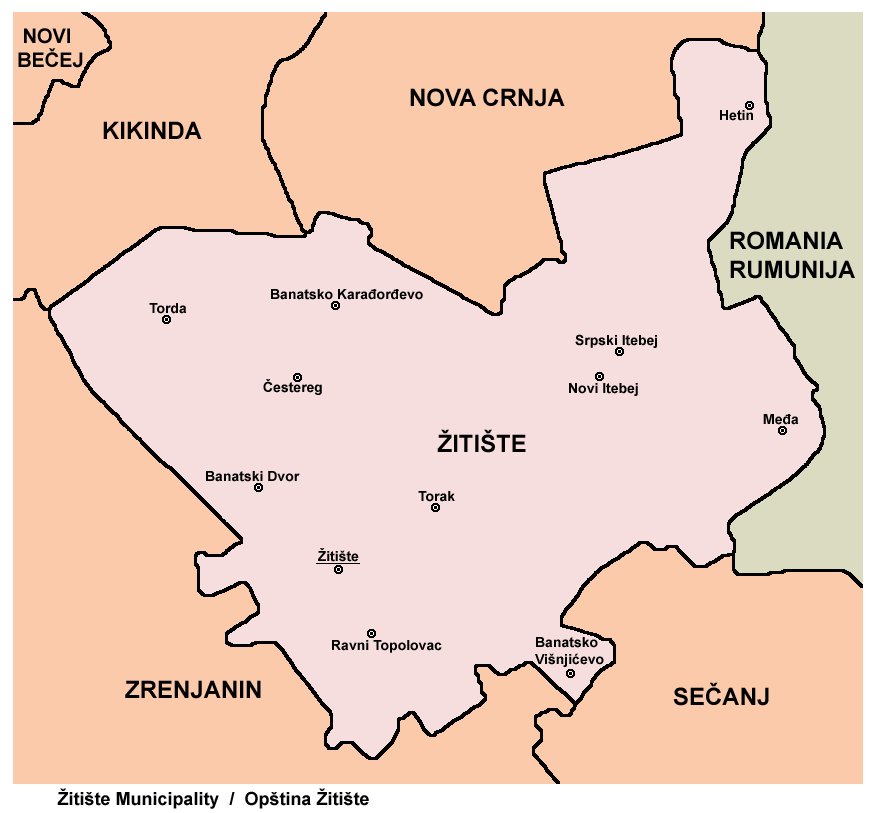
Map of Žitište municipality

Žitište municipality includes the town of Žitište and the following villages:

- Banatski Dvor
- Banatsko Višnjićevo
- Banatsko Karađorđevo
- Međa
- Novi Itebej (Hungarian: Magyarittabé)
- Ravni Topolovac
- Srpski Itebej
- Torak (Romanian: Torac)
- Torda (Hungarian: Torontáltorda)
- Hetin (Hungarian: Tamásfalva or Hetény)
- Čestereg

== Demographics ==
Historical population
Year	Pop.	±% p.a.
1948	36,375	—
1953	35,649	−0.40%
1961	33,514	−0.77%
1971	29,684	−1.21%
1981	25,579	−1.48%
1991	22,811	−1.14%
2002	20,399	−1.01%
2011	16,841	−2.11%
2022	13,412	−2.05%

According to the 2011 census, the population of the municipality of Žitište was 16,841 inhabitants.

=== Ethnic groups ===
Municipality

- Serbs = 10,436 (61.97%)
- Hungarians = 3,371 (20.02%)
- Romanians = 1,412 (8.38%)
- Romani = 832 (4.94%)
- Others and undeclared = 790 (4.69%)

Settlements with Serb ethnic majority are: Žitište, Banatsko Višnjićevo, Banatsko Karađorđevo, Međa, Ravni Topolovac, Srpski Itebej, and Čestereg. Settlements with Hungarian ethnic majority are: Novi Itebej (Magyarittabé in Hungarian), Torda, and Hetin (Tamásfalva in Hungarian). The settlement with Romanian ethnic majority is Torak (Begejci). Ethnically mixed settlement with relative Serb majority is Banatski Dvor (Szőllősudvarnok in Hungarian).

Town

According to the 2011 census the town of Žitište had 2,903 inhabitants, including:

- Serbs = 2,511 (86.50%)
- Romani = 175 (6.03%)
- Hungarians = 58 (2.00%)
- Others and undeclared = 159 (5.48%)

=== Language ===
Serbian, Hungarian, and Romanian language are officially used by municipal authorities.

== Sports ==
- KK Sveti Đorđe, basketball team
- OFK Begej Žitište, football club

== Attractions ==
In 2007, local authorities unveiled a monument in the centre of the town dedicated to fictional boxer Rocky Balboa. In 2009, filmmaker Barry Avrich produced and directed the documentary "Amerika Idol" about the making and dedication of the Rocky statue.

== Gallery ==
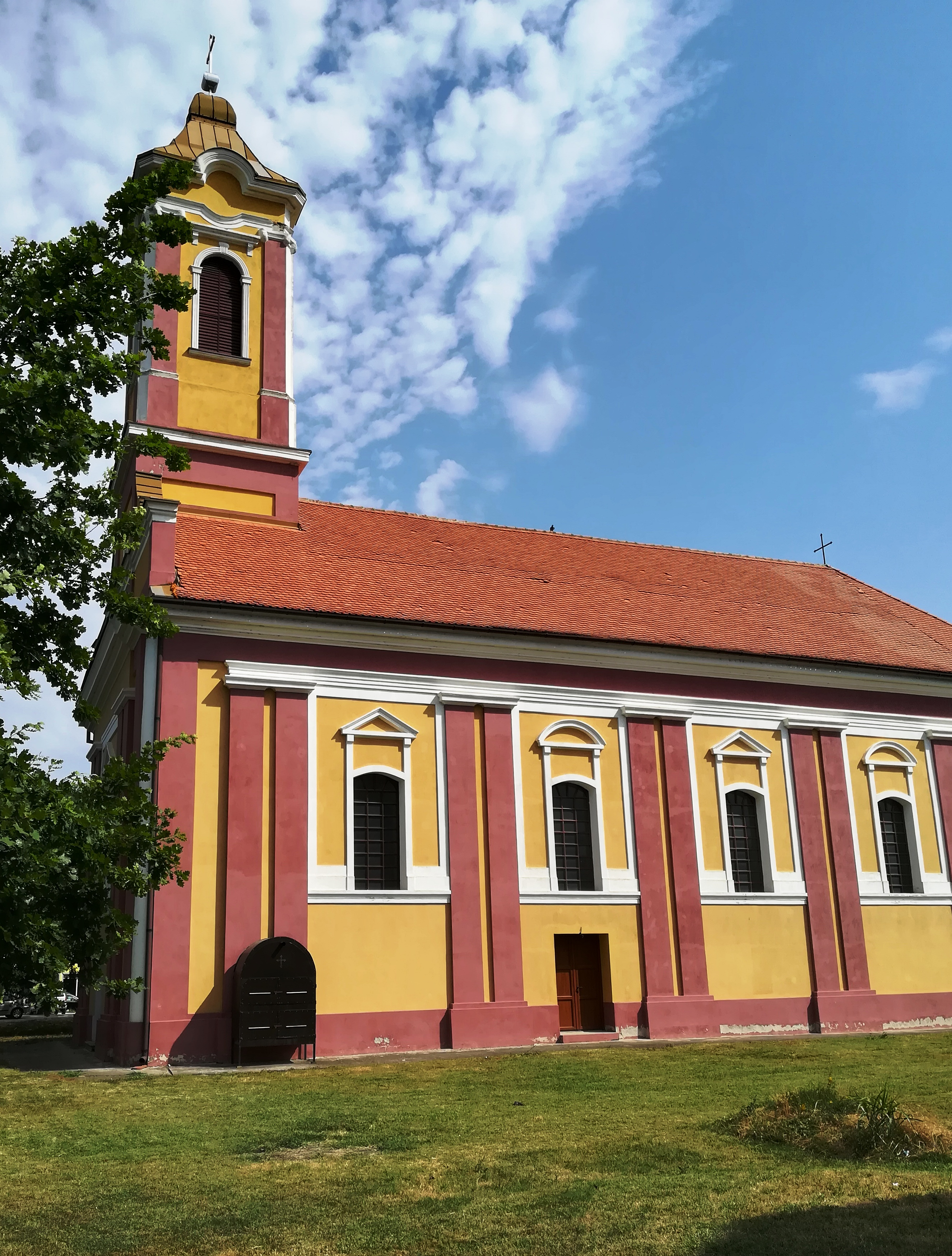
The Eastern Orthodox church of Saint George, built in 1810.

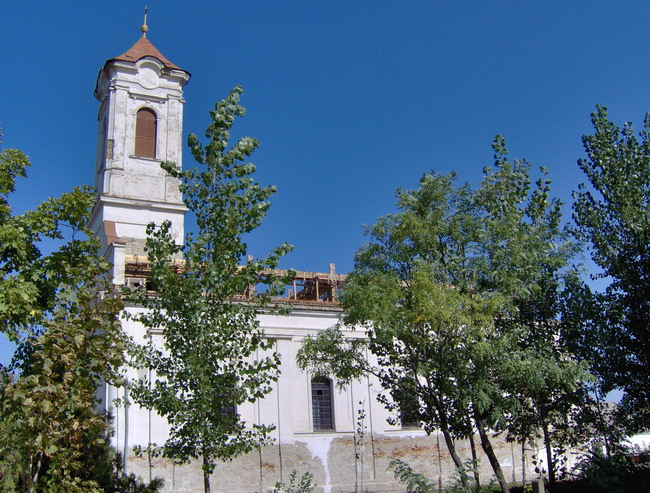
The Eastern Orthodox church of Saint George under re-construction

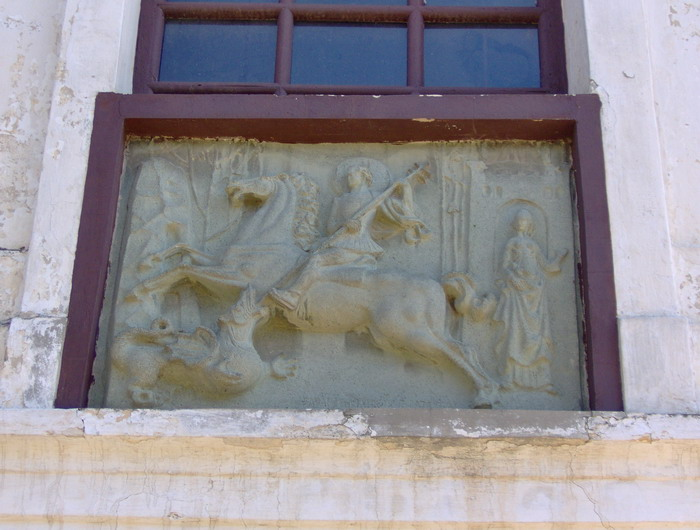
Relief depicting Saint George, above the entrance of the Eastern Orthodox church

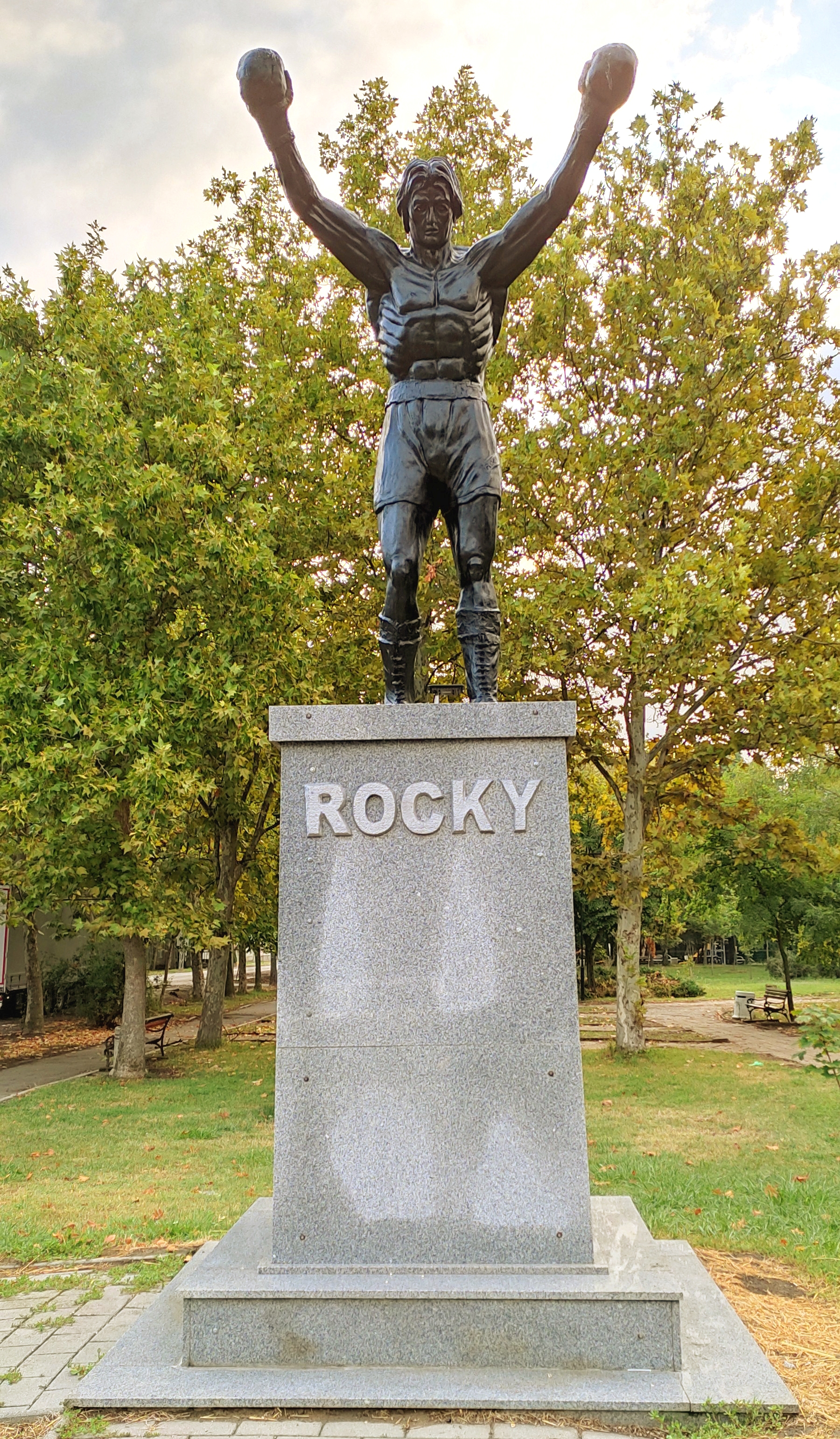
Monument of Rocky Balboa, built in 2007 in Žitište

== Notable inhabitants ==
- Radomir Antić

== See also ==
- List of places in Serbia
- List of cities, towns and villages in Vojvodina
- Municipalities of Serbia
- Central Banat District
