= Ethnic groups in Vojvodina =

Ethnic groups in Serbian province of Vojvodina

This is article about ethnic groups in Vojvodina, province of Serbia.

== Serbs ==
There are 1,190,785 Serbs in Vojvodina or 68.4% of the population of the province. Serbs make up majority in 26 of 37 cities and municipalities in Vojvodina. Cities and municipalities with an ethnic Serb majority are: Pećinci (89.3%), Sremska Mitrovica (86.1%), Titel (85.6%), Inđija (85.5%), Opovo (84.7%), Ruma (84.6%), Žabalj (82.6%), Stara Pazova (82.6%), Odžaci (82.4%), Irig (79.5%), Sremski Karlovci (79.3%), Šid (79.3%), Pančevo (79.2%), Bačka Palanka (78.8%), Novi Sad (78.3%), Kovin (76.9%), Zrenjanin (76.6%), Kikinda (75.8%), Bela Crkva (75.1%), Vršac (72.1%), Temerin (69.8%), Beočin (69.4%), Sečanj (68.8%), Novi Bečej (68.4%), Srbobran (67.7%), Nova Crnja (67.2%), Sombor (63.7%), Žitište (62.7%), Apatin (62.6%), Kula (62.4%), Vrbas (62.1%), Alibunar (58.5%), Novi Kneževac (58%), and Plandište (58%). Serbs form relative majority of the population in Bač (45.6%), Bečej (42.3%), and Subotica (34.3%).

Serbian is the official language in Serbia and is spoken by 76.4% of inhabitants of Vojvodina.

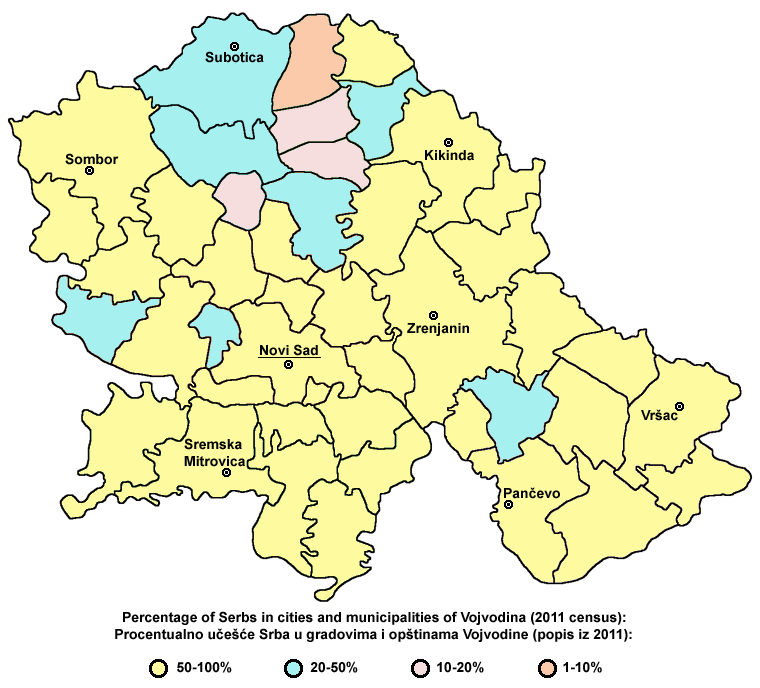
Share of Serbs in cities and municipalities, 2011

== Hungarians ==
There are 182,321 Hungarians in Vojvodina or 10.5% of the population and they are the second largest ethnic group in the region. Hungarians mostly live in northern Vojvodina (northern Bačka and northern Banat). They constitute an absolute majority in five municipalities: Kanjiža (83.1%), Senta (75.7%), Ada (72.7%), Bačka Topola (55.6%), and Mali Iđoš (51.8%). In Čoka, ethnically mixed municipality with no absolute majority held by any ethnic group, ethnic Hungarians constitute the largest share of the population, 44.8%.

Hungarian is one of the official languages of the provincial administration of Vojvodina and is spoken by 9.7% of inhabitants of the province.

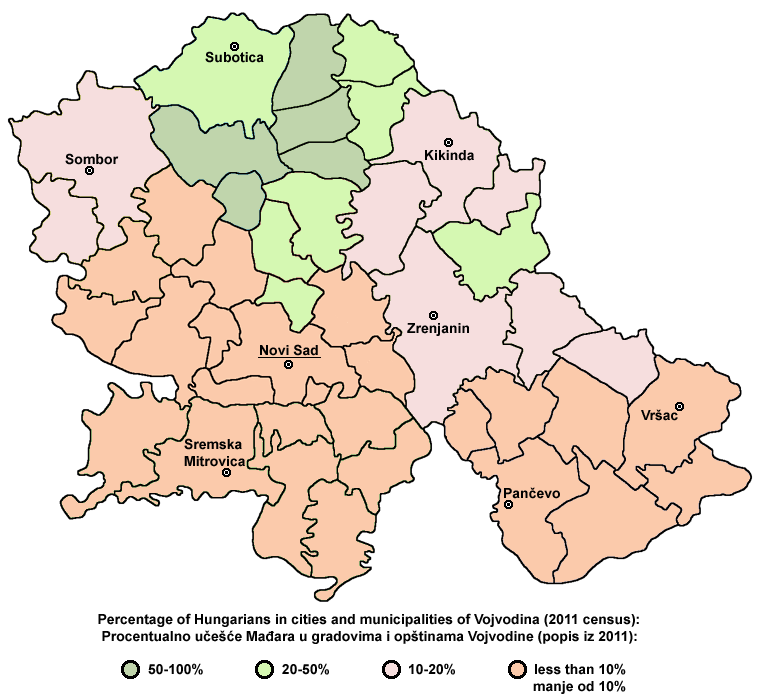
Share of Hungarians in cities and municipalities, 2011

== Roma ==
There are 40,938 Roma in Vojvodina or 2.3% of the population. The largest concentration of Roma could be found in the municipalities of Nova Crnja (11.4%), Beočin (8.9%), and Novi Kneževac (8.6%).

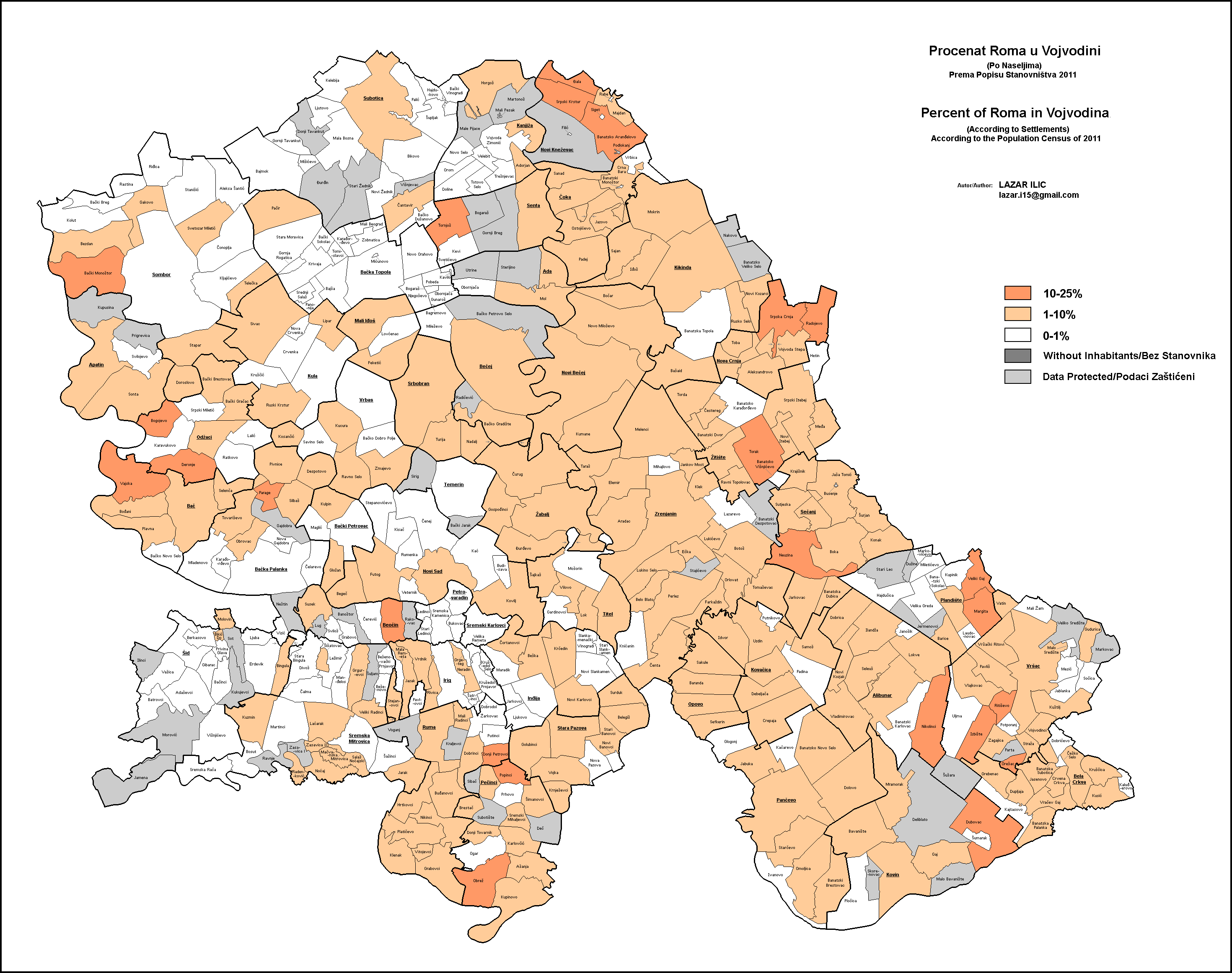
Share of Roma in settlements, 2011

== Slovaks ==
There are 39,807 Slovaks in Vojvodina or 2.3% of population. Slovaks constitute an absolute majority in the municipality of Bački Petrovac (60.6%) and they also constitute the relative majority of the population in Kovačica municipality (41%). The settlements with Slovak majority are Kovačica (76.5%) and Padina (92.6%) in the municipality of Kovačica municipality; Bački Petrovac (75.1%), Kulpin (65.3%), and Gložan (79.8%) in the municipality of Bački Petrovac; Lug (91.7%) in the municipality of Beočin; Selenča (87.8%) in the municipality of Bač; Janošik (85.1%) in the municipality of Alibunar; Pivnice (73.2%) in the municipality of Bačka Palanka; Kisač (69.5%) in the City of Novi Sad; Slankamenački Vinogradi (66.3%) in the municipality of Inđija; and Ljuba (51.5%) in the municipality of Šid. The settlements with Slovak plurality include Lalić (44.9%) in the municipality of Odžaci, Hajdučica (36.5%) in the municipality of Plandište, and Belo Blato (33.7%) in the City of Zrenjanin.

Slovak is one of the official languages of the provincial administration of Vojvodina and is spoken by 2.1% of the population of the province.

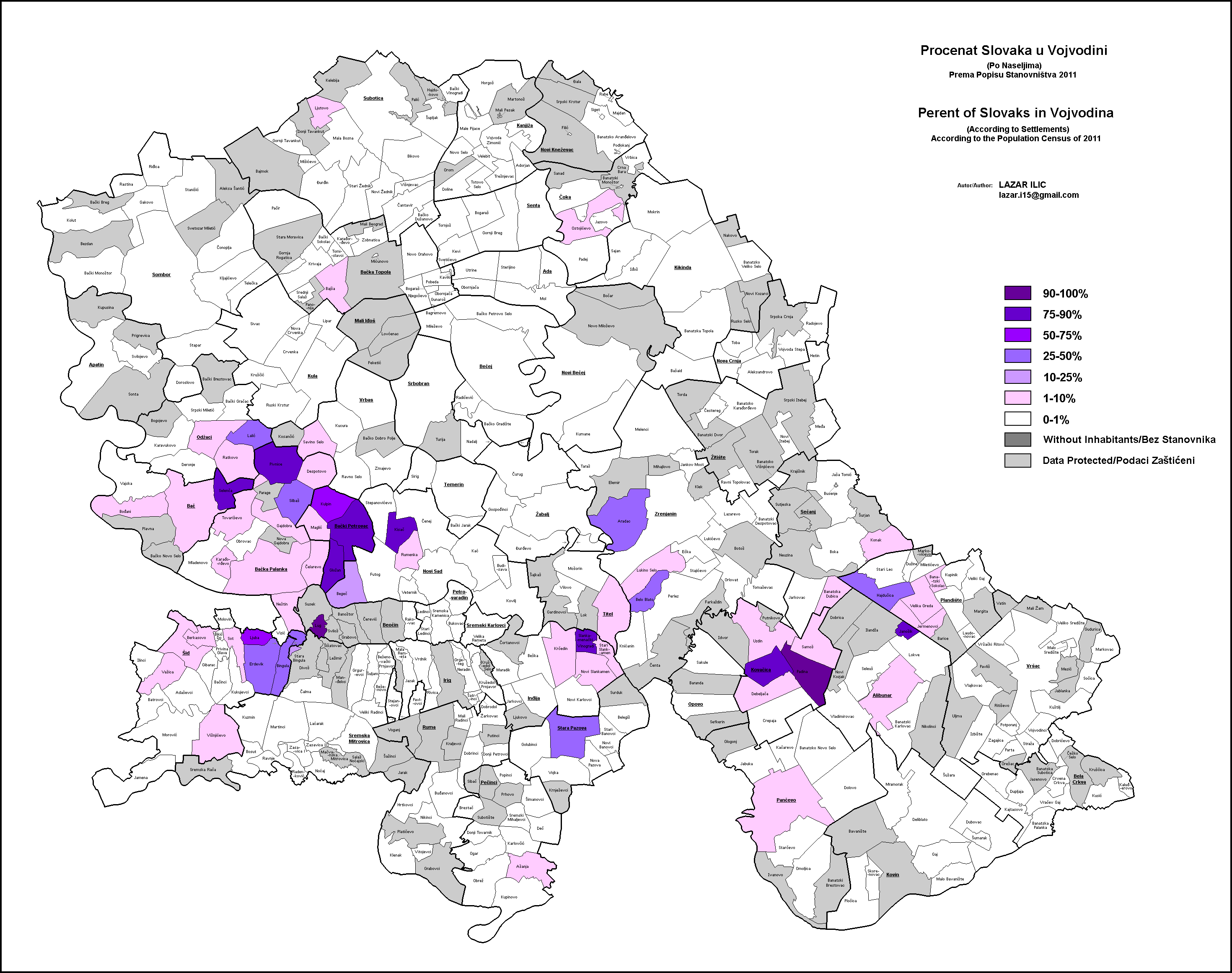
Share of Slovaks in settlements, 2011

== Croats ==
There are 32,684 Croats in Vojvodina or 1.9% of the population. The largest concentration of Croats is found in the municipalities of Apatin (8.9%) and Subotica (7.4%). They form majority of population in villages Bački Monoštor (52.3% of population) and Bački Breg (52.1%), both in the administrative area of the city of Sombor; and relative majorities in the village of Sonta (47.2%) in the municipality of Apatin, as well as in the following villages in the administrative area of city of Subotica: Donji Tavankut (42.2%), Mala Bosna (39%), Đurđin (36.2%), Stari Žednik (31%), and Bikovo (24.5%). Most of Bunjevci and almost all of Šokci of Vojvodina declare themselves as Croats.

Croatian is one of the official languages of the provincial administration of Vojvodina and is spoken by 0.5% of the population of the province.

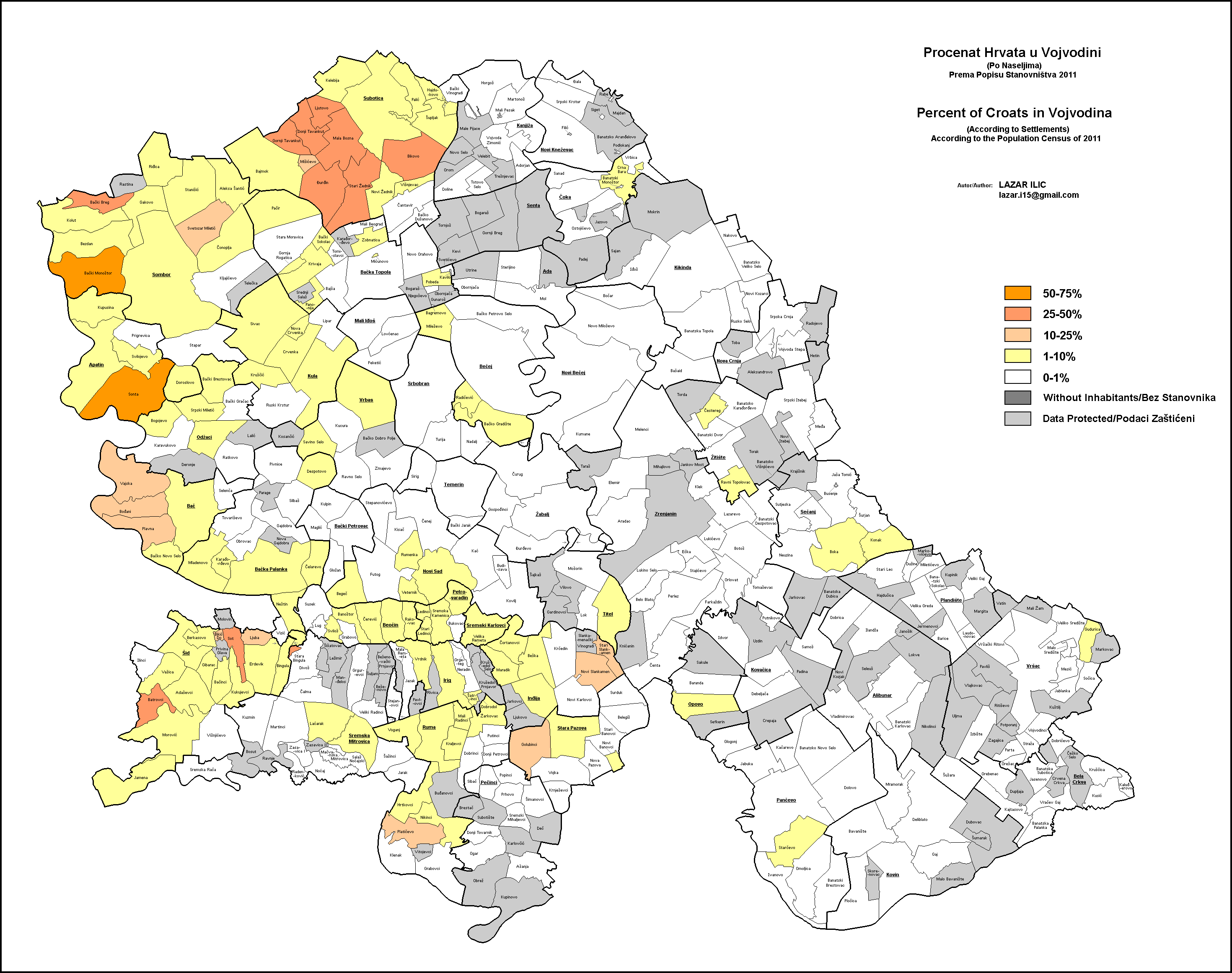
Share of Croats in settlements, 2011

== Romanians ==
There are 19,595 Romanians in Vojvodina or 1.1% of the population. The largest concentrations of Romanians are found in the municipalities of Alibunar (23.3%) and Vršac (9.2%). They settled in Banat during great migrations of Balkan peoples caused by Ottoman conquest, and also during the Habsburg rule.

Romanian is one of the official languages of the provincial administration of Vojvodina and is spoken by 1% of the population of the province.

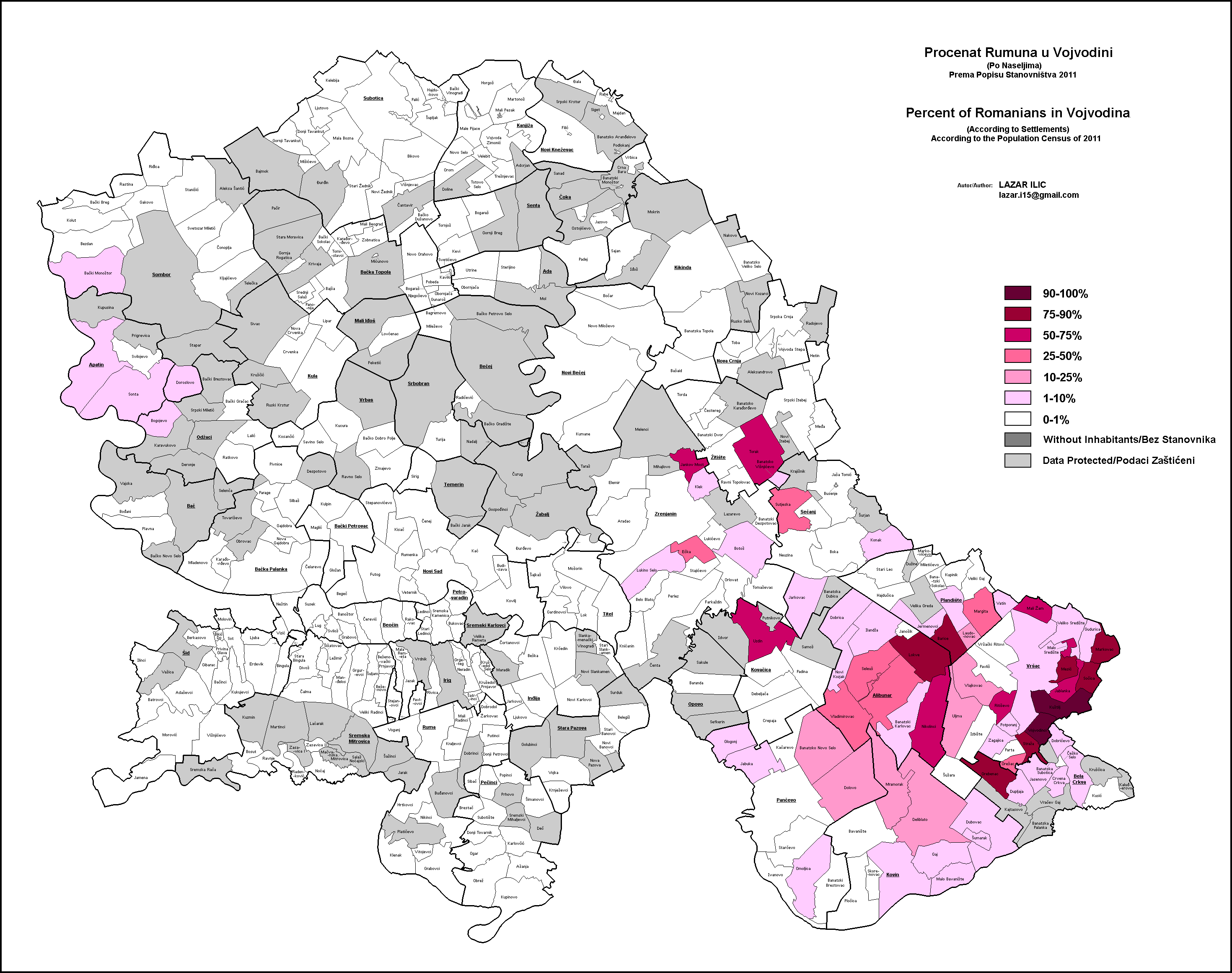
Share of Romanians in settlements, 2011

== Yugoslavs ==
There are 12,438 Yugoslavs in Vojvodina or 0.7% of the population. They mostly speak Serbian.

== Montenegrins ==
There are 12,424 Montenegrins in Vojvodina or 0.7% of the population; however, these figures do not include those who have partial or full ancestry from present-day Montenegro, but identify ethnically as Serb, though many also claim a fairly strong Montenegrin regional identity. Montenegrins settled in Vojvodina during the 20th century, mostly shortly after World War II. The largest concentration of ethnic Montenegrins could be found in the municipalities of central Bačka: Mali Iđoš (12.3%), Vrbas (11.6%), and Kula (5.6%). Settlements with significant share of Montenegrins include: Lovćenac (37.3%) in Mali Iđoš municipality, Savino Selo (17.9%) in Vrbas municipality, and Kruščić (16%) in Kula municipality. They mostly speak Serbian.

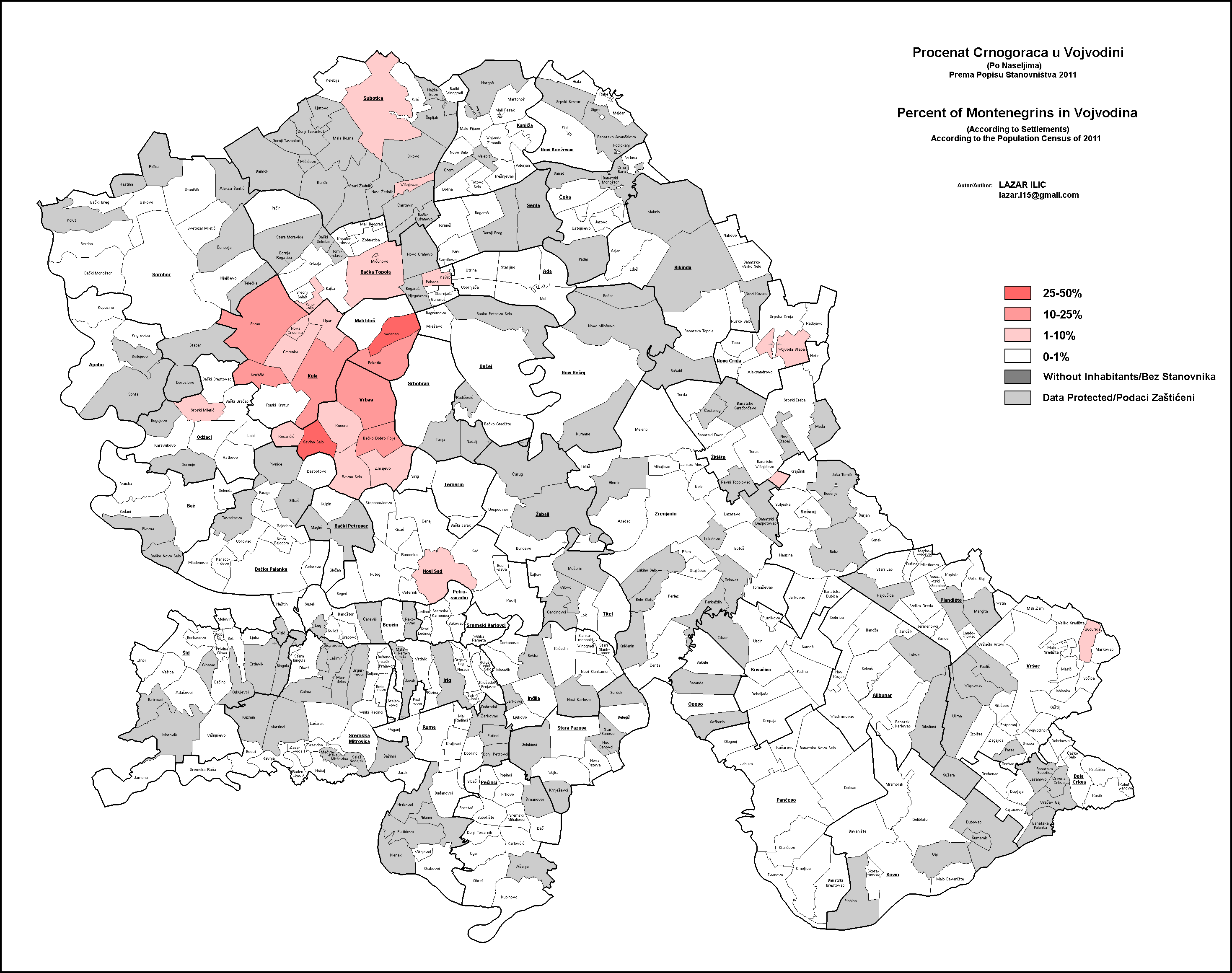
Share of Montenegrins in settlements, 2011

== Rusyns ==
There are 11,207 Rusyns in Vojvodina or 0.6% of the population. The largest concentration of Rusyns could be found in the municipalities of Kula (10.1%), Vrbas (7.7%), Žabalj (4%), and Šid (2.9%). There is only one settlement with ethnic Rusyn majority, Ruski Krstur (77%) in Kula municipality, and two with ethnic Rusyn relative majority: Kucura (42.3%) in Vrbas municipality, and Bikić Do (41.2%) in Šid municipality.

The Rusyn is one of the official languages of the provincial administration of Vojvodina and is spoken by 0.5% of the population of the province.

== Bunjevci ==
There are 10,949 Bunjevci in Vojvodina or 0.6% of the population. The largest concentrations of Bunjevci are found in the cities of Subotica (7.3%) and Sombor (1.8%). Settlements with ethnic Bunjevac relative majority include two villages in the administrative area of the City of Subotica: Ljutovo (31%) and Gornji Tavankut (26.6%). Members of Bunjevci community are divided among themselves on the question of ethnic identity since many identify themselves as Croats, with many cases in which one sibling has declared as Bunjevac, while the other one has declared as Croat. In the past, they spoke a specific Ikavian-Shtokavian dialect of Serbo-Croatian language, while nowadays they mostly declare their language as Serbian.

== Macedonians ==
There are 7,021 Macedonians in Vojvodina or 0.4% of the population. The largest concentrations of Macedonians are found in southern Banat, in the municipality of Plandište (7.7%) and the city of Pančevo (2.6%). Macedonians form significant part of populations in two villages located in the administrative area of city of Pančevo, Jabuka (23.7%) and Kačarevo (11.2%), as well as in the village of Dužine (27%) in municipality of Plandište. They settled in Vojvodina during the 20th century, mostly after World War II. Macedonians mostly speak Serbian.

== Germans ==
There are 1,985 Germans (or Danube Swabians and Banat Swabians) in Vojvodina or just 0.1% of the population. The German population was far more numerous in the past (about 350,000 before the World War II). More than 250,000 left in the aftermath of World War II when the Yugoslav Communist government took reprisals on ethnic Germans with their citizenship revoked and their belongings and houses nationalized and taken from them. Between 1944 and 1946, a prison camp system was established for Yugoslav citizens of German origin, usually in settlements where they lived. After prison camps were abolished, ethnic Germans of Yugoslavia regained their rights and citizenship and most of them emigrated to Germany or Austria in the following years because of economic reasons. Before the World War II, Germans were majority in the municipalities of Odžaci (68.9%), Vrbas (61.1%), and Apatin (60.3%).

== Czechs ==
There are 1,317 Czechs in Vojvodina. The largest concentration of Czechs could be found in the municipality of Bela Crkva (3%). A tiny village of Češko Selo, in the Bela Crkva municipality, is the only settlement with ethnic Czech majority (65.4%). They mostly speak Serbian.

== Bulgarians ==
There are 1,123 Bulgarians in Vojvodina. The Banat Bulgarians are a traditional Bulgarian Roman Catholic minority in the Banat region, the Serbian part of which belongs to Vojvodina. They are historically present in the villages of Ivanovo, Belo Blato, Konak (Kanak), Jaša Tomić (Modoš), Skorenovac (Gjurgevo), as well as towns of Pančevo, Zrenjanin, Vršac, and Kovin.

== See also ==
- Demographic history of Vojvodina
