= Ana Milodanović =

- Ана Милодановић
- Born: 18 May 1926; Stari Žednik, Kingdom of Serbs, Croats and Slovenes
- Died: 20 July 2011 (aged 85); Subotica, Serbia
- Occupation: straw artist
- Years active: 1961–2000

Ana Milodanović (Serbian Cyrillic: Ана Милодановић; 18 May 1926 – 20 July 2011) was a Serbian straw artist, or slamarka, of Bunjevka descent. She was the first artist to take the traditional folk art celebrating the harvest festival and turn it into two-dimensional pictures. As the first straw artist to join the Artist's Colony formed by the "Group of Six", she won acclaim with her picture Rit in 1962. Her works have been exhibited in over 100 group and solo showings. She has pieces held by several religious organizations and she was featured as one of the artists in a documentary about the craft in 2012.

== Early life ==
Ana Milodanović was born on 18 May 1926 in Žednik in the Kingdom of Serbs, Croats and Slovenes. Her sisters, Teza and Đula Milodanović would both become Folk artists as well. In the tradition of the Bunjevac people, the sisters learned the art of braiding straw to create crowns, rings and ornamental objects. The craft developed around the harvest celebration of Dužijanca, when works made of straw were used to express the importance of the crop to the community. Milodanović began by forming religious artifacts of straw, such as Kalež (Chalice, 1956), Jaganjac na knjizi (Lamb on a book, 1957), Sveto Trojstvo (Holy Trinity, 1958) and Pokaznica (Processional cross, 1959). When Cardinal Aloysius Stepinac died in 1960, Ana and Teza developed a crest to commemorate him, which increased interest in the craft. The work is in the collection of the Zagreb Cathedral.

== Career ==
In 1961, a group of naïve artists, including Lajoš Đurči, Lajčo Evetovic (hr), Ivan Jandrić (hr), Ludvig Laslo, Žarko Rafajlović, and Stipan Šabić (hr), known as the "Group of Six" founded an art colony at the "Matija Gubec" primary school in Tavankut. Šabić was the director of the elementary school and Jandrić was an art teacher there. Other artists joined the group of six, including Ivan Prćić Gospodar (hr), a poet from Subotica who would become the drama director of the group. Gospodar recruited Milodanović to join the group, because of her reputation as a straw weaver. Milodanović began creating pictures made of straw, the first artist to use the ancient skills to produce two-dimensional works.

At the first group showing of painters and slamarke, held in 1962, Milodanović showed a model of St. Mark Church in Žednik (1961) and a pictorial work, originally called Voda i sunce (Water and Sun, 1962) and later titled Rit. The work was intricate and unique, involving bending, braiding, chopping, fringing and binding the straw with needle and thread. The following year, she created a new work, Sova na đermi (Owl on Djerma, 1963), which brought public interest and critical acclaim to the craft. While other slamarke had followed her lead, press reports noted she was the most skilled, praising her skill and patience to create the expressive works which evoked movement and depicted the wildlife of the Bačka region, with such pieces as Žetvi (Harvest, 1964–1965), Devojčica sa guskom (Girl with a goose, 1964–1965), and Dečak sa leptirom (Boy with a butterfly, 1964–1965).

Rit, by Ana Milodanović, 1962 first two-dimensional work of straw

What began as regional art shows soon spread to international audiences with Milodanović exhibiting in over 100 shows, in many locations, including Baja, Hungary; Belgrade; Dubrovnik; Kostanjevica, Slovenia Moscow; Novi Sad; Sarajevo and Zagreb, among many others. In addition to these, Milodanović also exhibited in Germany, Mexico and the United States. At the 1970 Exhibition of the Yugoslav Association of Deaf Artists in Moscow Milodanović won the first prize and the same year won awards at an exhibition in Novi Sad. The public activities of the art colony were banned in 1972 when the leaders of the art colony were ostracized in a political purge.

When the colony closed, Milodanović and her sisters Julija and Teza continued to work from their home, though Julija and Teza had jobs in Subotica and Ana kept the house for all of them. In 1976, she won a gold medal at the International Festival of Naïve Art held in Moscow with her work, Momačko kolo (Bachelor Wheel). Her work was praised for its depth and perspective. Only a few slamarke continued the craft until the late 1980s when the artists organized again in Tavankut. Milodanović became a role model for young artists who wanted to learn the craft.

Milodanović continued to make religious artifacts, at least 30 are known, including a crown made for Pope John XXIII in 1963, which is held in the vaults of the Vatican; a mitre and crosier made in 1963 for Bishop Matiša Zvekanović (hr), held by the Diocese of Subotica; a 1964 globe featuring the dome of St. Peter's Basilica also held by the Diocese of Subotica; the Maslinske gore (Mount of Olives, 1968) in the artist's private collection, and others. She participated in exhibitions through 2000 and the following year was one of the main subjects of a monograph by Lazar Ivan Krmpotić. Umjetnost u tehnici slame (Art and straw technique).

== Death and legacy ==
Milodanović died on 20 July 2011 in Subotica, in the Autonomous Province of Vojvodina, Serbia. In 2012, a film Od zrna do slike (Serbian: Од зрна до слике, From Grain to Painting) by Branko Ištvančić was produced by Atalanta, HRT, and OLimp featuring Milodanović and Josefa Skenderović as outstanding straw artists. The film won prizes in both Los Angeles and Romania.
