= Tavankut =

Tavankut may refer to:

- Donji Tavankut, a village near Subotica, Serbia
- Gornji Tavankut, a village near Subotica, Serbia
