= Đurđin =

Đurđin Ђурђин (Serbian)
- Village
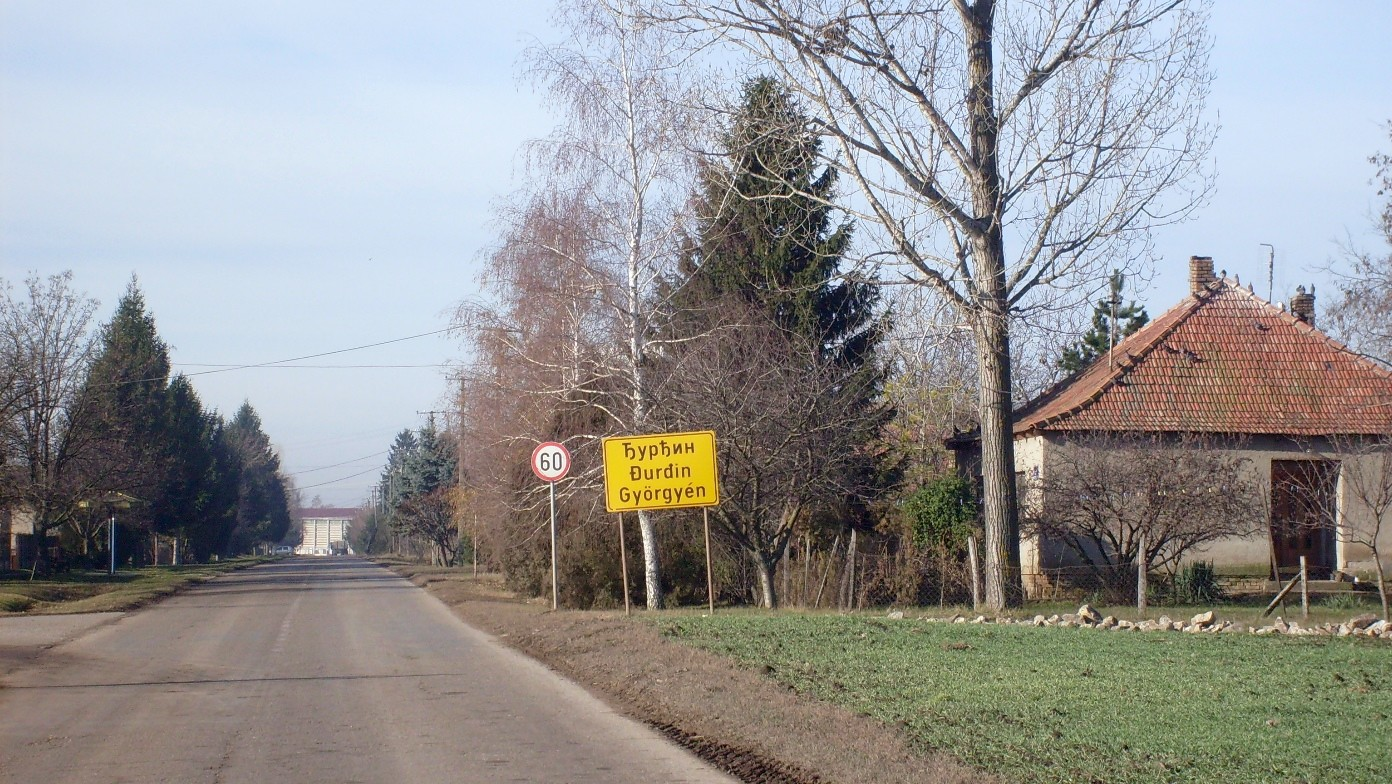

- Location within Vojvodina Location within Serbia Location within Europe
- Coordinates: 45°57′7″N 19°29′14″E
- Country: Serbia
- Region: Vojvodina
- District: North Bačka District
- Municipality: Subotica

Population (2022)
  - Total: 1٬202
- Time zone: UTC+1 (CET)
  - Summer (DST): UTC+2 (CEST)

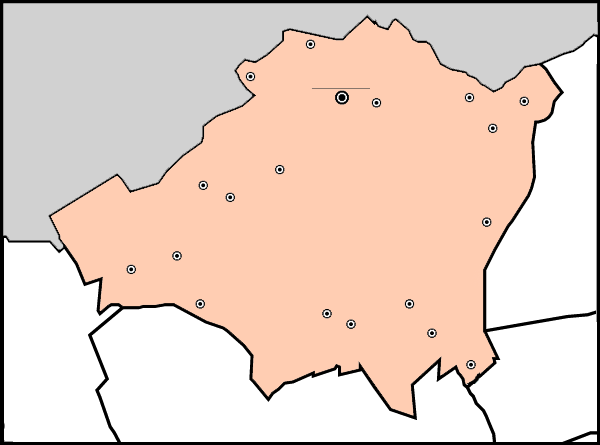

Đurđin is a village located in the administrative area of the City of Subotica, in the North Bačka District, Vojvodina, Serbia. The village has a population of 1,202 people (2022 census).

== Name ==
In Serbian the village is known as Ђурђин or Đurđin, in Croatian as Đurđin, in Bunjevac as Đurđin, and in Hungarian as Györgyén.

== Demographics ==
=== Historical population ===
- 1961: 2,992
- 1971: 2,805
- 1981: 2,297
- 1991: 1,911
- 2002: 1,746
- 2011: 1,441
- 2022: 1,202

=== Ethnic groups ===
According to data from the 2022 census, ethnic groups in the village include:

- 436 (36.2%) Croats
- 342 (28.4%) Serbs
- 160 (13.4%) Bunjevci
- 65 (5.4%) Hungarians
- Others/Undeclared/Unknown

== See also ==
- List of cities, towns and villages in Vojvodina
- List of places in Serbia
