= Gyula J. Obádovics =

Hungarian mathematician (born 1927)

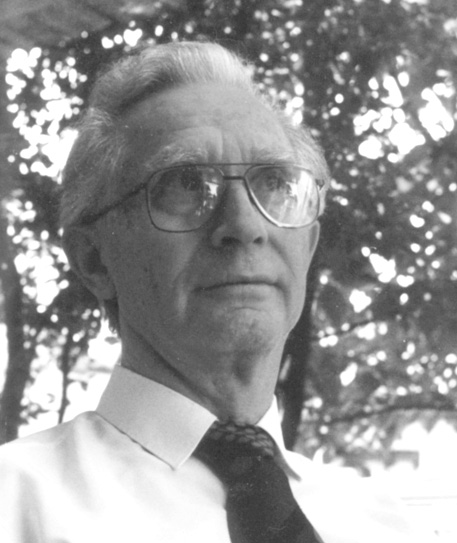
Obádovics J. Gyula

Gyula J. Obádovics (Hungarian: [ˈɟulɒ ˈobaːdovit͡ʃ]; born 3 March 1927) is a Hungarian mathematician and professor emeritus.

== Biography ==
Obádovics was born in a Bunjevac family. The first major stage of his career was his position as ministerial clerk at the Educational Department of the Ministry of Transportation and Postal Affairs between 1949 and 1951. Adjunct at the Mathematics Faculty of the College for Technical Teacher Training in 1951 and 1952. Worked at the Mathematics Faculty of the Heavy Industry Technical University of Miskolc for eighteen years as adjunct, later as docent. Director of the Institute for Computer Studies of the Ministry of Labour from 1970 until 1981, then worked as head of faculty, professor and director at the Institute of Mathematics and Computer Studies at the Agricultural Mechanical Engineering Faculty of the Agricultural University of Gödöllő until 1988. Became a lecturer at the Mathematics and Statistics Faculty of Kodolányi János University of Applied Sciences in Székesfehérvár in 2002. This excellent teacher is also active in this field of interest, and is Ph.D. in mathematics.

Obádovics published over fifty scientific articles and university notes.

== Awards ==
Neumann János Memorial Medal, MTESZ Award, Silver and Gold Ranks of the Labour Decoration, Gold Ring of Gate Graduates, Memorial Medal of the Faculty of Mechanical Engineering of the University of Miskolc, Memorial Medal of the Anniversary Faculty, Knight’s Cross of Order of Merit of the Republic of Hungary at the "lovagkereszt" level, and in 2018 at the "középkeresztje" level.

== Selected publications ==
- Mathematics (1st Edition 1958, 18th Edition 2005, Taschenbuch der Elementar-Mathematik (mit praktischen Anwendungen, 1962, two editions)
- Numeric Methods and Programming (university textbook with a Quality Award, 1975, two editions)
- Advanced Mathematics (co-author, 1999, three editions)
- Linear Algebra with examples (2001)
- Probability Theory and Mathematical Statistics (2001, six editions)
- Matrices and Differential Equation Systems (2005)
