= Csikéria =

Csikéria Čikerija, Tschikri
- Csikéria
- Coordinates: 46.1222°N 19.4789°E
- Country: Hungary
- County: Bács-Kiskun

Area
  - Total: 25.81 km^{2} (9.97 sq mi)

Population (2005)
  - Total: 942
  - Density: 36/km^{2} (93/sq mi)
- Time zone: UTC+1 (CET)
  - Summer (DST): UTC+2 (CEST)
- Postal code: 6424
- Area code: 79

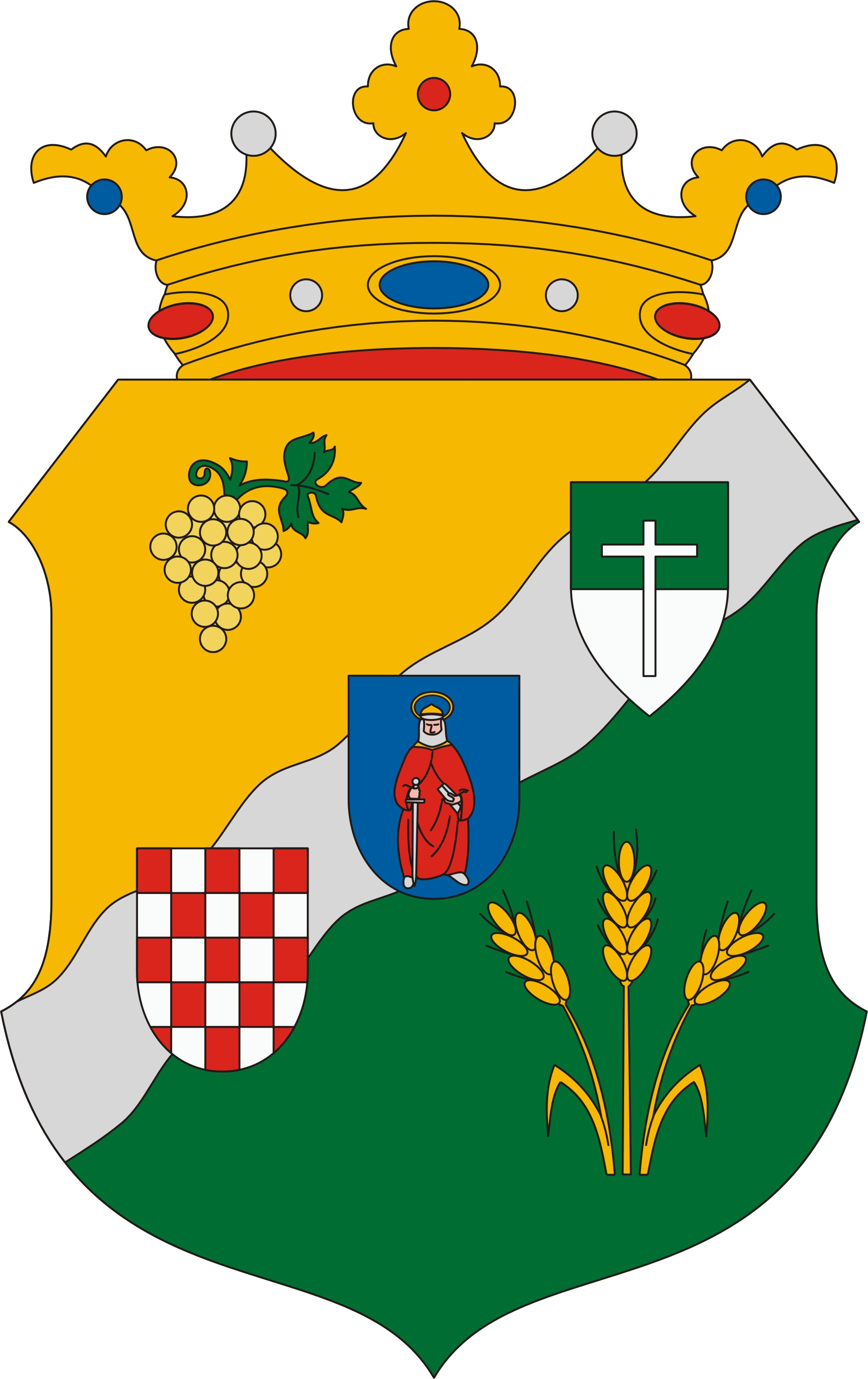
Csikéria coat of arms

Csikéria (Croatian: Čikerija; German: Tschikri) is a village in Bács-Kiskun County, in the Southern Great Plain region of Hungary.

== Geography ==
It covers an area of 25.81 km^{2} (10 sq mi) and has a population of 942 people (2005).

== Demography ==
- Magyars
- Croats
- Bunjevci
