= Kunbaja =

Kunbaja Kumbaj, Kunbaja
- Location of Kunbaja
- Coordinates: 46.085°N 19.421°E
- Country: Hungary
- County: Bács-Kiskun

Area
  - Total: 33.72 km^{2} (13.02 sq mi)

Population (2005)
  - Total: 1,802
  - Density: 53/km^{2} (140/sq mi)
- Time zone: UTC+1 (CET)
  - Summer (DST): UTC+2 (CEST)
- Postal code: 6435
- Area code: 79

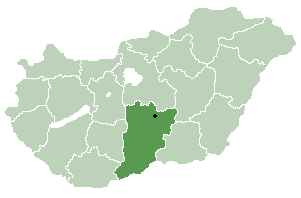
Location of Bács-Kiskun county in the Southern Great Plain region

Kunbaja (German: Kumbaj or Kunbaja) is a village in Bács-Kiskun county, in the Southern Great Plain region of southern Hungary.

The village name reflects the presence of Kumans in this region.

== Geography ==
It covers an area of 33.72 km^{2} (13 sq mi) and has a population of 1802 people (2002).

== Notable people ==
- Ivan Antunović, titular bishop, one of leaders of national revival of Croats from Bačka
