= Ivan Antunović =

Ivan Antunović (Hungarian: Antunovich János; 19 June 1815 – 3 January 1888) was a Croatian writer, one of the most prominent public persons among the Bunjevci and Šokci people of his time. He was titular bishop in the service of the Kalocsa Archdiocese, Hungary. Antunović's writings helped preserve the language and culture of the Bunjevci and Šokci people.

== Biography ==
Antunović was born in the village of Kunbaja, in Bács-Bodrog County, Kingdom of Hungary, Austrian Empire (today Hungary).

Antunović descended from an old noble family and studied in Kalocsa, Subotica, Pécs and Szeged. He graduated from the Roman Catholic seminary in Kalocsa, and 1842 became the priest of the parish in the village of Bácsalmás. He was versed in several languages and closely followed the world events at the time, especially in Croatia, where he befriended the members of the Illyrian movement, including the likes of Josip Juraj Strossmayer, Ivan Kukuljević, Franjo Rački, Ivan Mažuranić, Ilija Okrugić, Juraj Dobrila.

His entry into the public life happened in 1869 in Kalocsa when he published Poziv Bunjevacah, Šokacah i Bošnjakah na utemeljenje jednog pučkog lista (A call to Bunjevci, Šokci and Bosniaks to establish a paper for the people). Soon he founded and edited the newspaper called Bunjevačke i šokačke novine (Bunjevci and Šokci News) on 19 March 1870. In 1871, he added another paper for literary and linguistic matters called the Bunjevačka i šokačka vila. The Vila split off into a separate newspaper in 1873 (after the Novine stopped being published the year earlier), and continued to be published until 18 September 1876.

Bishop Antunović was widely recognized as the person who led the effort to assert his people in Vojvodina during a time when the national revival (romantic nationalism) of the Croats and the Serbs left the Bunjevci and Šokci somewhat stranded, as the Catholic minorities which were more inclined to become part of the Croatian nation in regions where the Orthodox Serbian nation was in the majority.

He persistently worked on the national awakening of Croat subgroups Bunjevci i Šokci, at the time heavily exposed to intensive assimilatory and decroatization policy. He once said: "Wherever were Serbs, there were... also Bunjevci and Šokci, or as we like to call ourselves today, Croats.".

He was the cousin of Miroljub (Franjo) Ante Evetović and Ivan Evetović (by their maternal side). He took Franjo Ante under his tutorship, so he could have an education in Kalocsa, in the Jesuit gymnasium, because, Franjo Ante turned out to be an excellent pupil. Although Franjo Ante wanted to join to Premostrateg order, on Antunović's pleading, Franjo Ante joined Franciscans.

=== Literary work ===
The main work of Ivan Antunović was his treatise Razprava o podunavskih i potisanskih Bunjevcih i Šokcih u pogledu narodnom, vjerskom, umnom, građanskom i gospodarskom (Discussion of the Bunjevci and Šokci at the Danube and Tisa, in the matters of nationality, religion, mind, citizen life and economy), printed in Vienna in 1882. This book described his programme of encouraging the people to preserve their history and to establish a consciousness of their origin, language and faith, which he deemed essential for their survival against assimilation. In the book he also emphasised the importance of a social reconstruction of the family in these communities, thereby developing a feeling of solidarity both within the family and between the families and indeed an entire nation, both the communities in Vojvodina and the main body of it in Croatia.

His other works included the novel "Odmetnik" (published in Zagreb in 1875, 293 pages), a romantic novel subtitled poviestna pripoviedka (historical story) as the protagonist was based on the Bunjevac scientist Ignjat Martinović (1755–1795), a professor of philosophy and mathematics in the Franciscan monastery in Pest, who abruptly left the Franciscan order and became a Jacobite (a group of revolutionary democrats, named after St. Jacob's Monastery in Paris) after being insulted by the members of the nobility who denied his scholarship because of his descent from a poor family.

He also left two large novel manuscripts about the life of Bačka nobility in the first half of the 19th century, titled Posljednji Gizdarev (36 chapters, 357 pages), and Bariša Kitković (42 chapters, 451 page).

Antunović died in Kalocsa, Bács-Kiskun at the age of 72. One of the obituaries for Ivan Antunović said that he funded the education of 200 poor Bunjevac children.

In 1913, an association of Bunjevci and other Croatian university students in Budapest was named "Antunović". The Catholic Institute for Culture, History and Spirituality, a religious-scientific-cultural institute of Croats from Subotica, is named "Ivan Antunović" in his honour.

== Works ==
- Poučne iskrice
- Slavjan
- Odmetnik
- Bog s čovjekom
- Naputak (a polemic against the Nazarenes)
- Rasprava o podunavskih i potisanskih Bunjevcih i Šokcih u pogledu narodnom, vjerskom, umnom i gospodarskom
- The drunken mind speaks a Sober heart

== Sources ==
- Milovan Miković: Iznad žita nebo, Subotica/Zagreb, 2003
- Matija Evetović: Život i rad biskupa Ivana Antunovića narodnog preporoditelja, Subotica, 1935
- Geza Kikić: Antologija proze bunjevačkih Hrvata, Matica Hrvatska, Zagreb, 1971
- Ante Sekulić: Hrvatska preporodna knjizevnost u Ugarskom Podunavlju do 1918., Zagreb, 1994
- Skenderović, Robert (May 2007). "Suradnja biskupa J. J. Strossmayera i Ivana Antunovića" (PDF). Croatica Christiana Periodica (in Croatian). 31 (59): 85–103.
