= Bikovo =

Bikovo Биково (Serbian)
- Village (Selo)
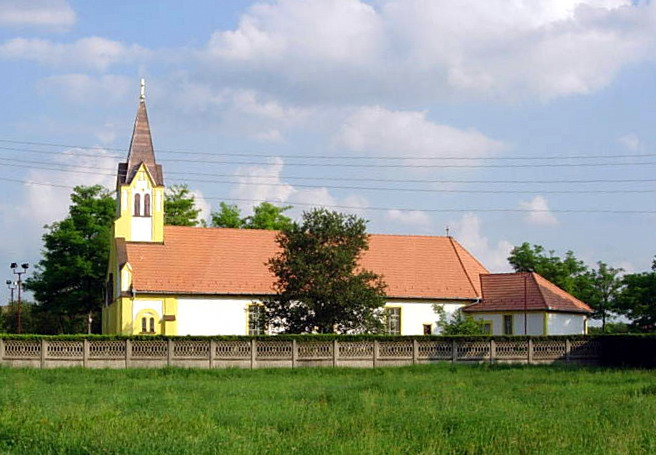
- The Catholic church in Bikovo

- Location within Vojvodina Location within Serbia Location within Europe
- Coordinates: 46°01′N 19°46′E
- Country: Serbia
- Province: Vojvodina
- Municipality: Subotica

Population (2022)
  - Total: 1,291
- Time zone: UTC+1 (CET)
  - Summer (DST): UTC+2 (CEST)

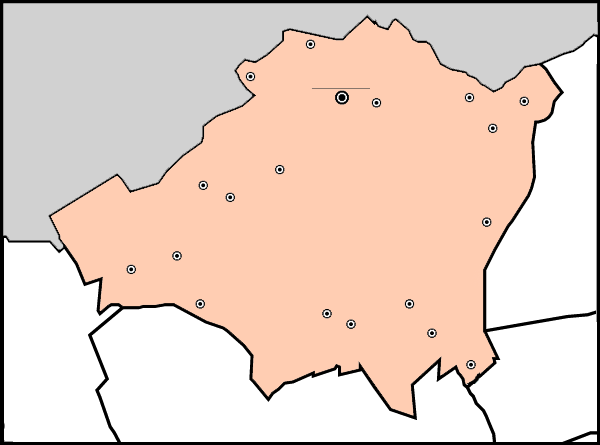

Bikovo (Serbian Cyrillic: Биково) is a village located in the administrative area of the City of Subotica, North Bačka District, Vojvodina, Serbia. The village is ethnically mixed and its population numbering 1,291 people (2022 census).

== Name ==
In Serbian the village is known as Биково or Bikovo, in Croatian as Bikovo, in Bunjevac as Bikovo, in Hungarian as Békova, and in German as Békovinenstadt.

== Demographics ==
=== Historical population ===
- 1961: 3,236
- 1971: 2,786
- 1981: 2,203
- 1991: 1,942
- 2002: 1,824
- 2011: 1,487
- 2022: 1,291

=== Ethnic groups ===
According to data from the 2022 census, ethnic groups in the village include:

- 317 (24.5%) Croats
- 272 (21%) Serbs
- 216 (16.7%) Bunjevci
- 150 (11.6%) Hungarians
- Others/Undeclared/Unknown

== See also ==
- List of places in Serbia
- List of cities, towns and villages in Vojvodina
