= Ljutovo =

Ljutovo Љутово (Serbian)
- Village (Selo)
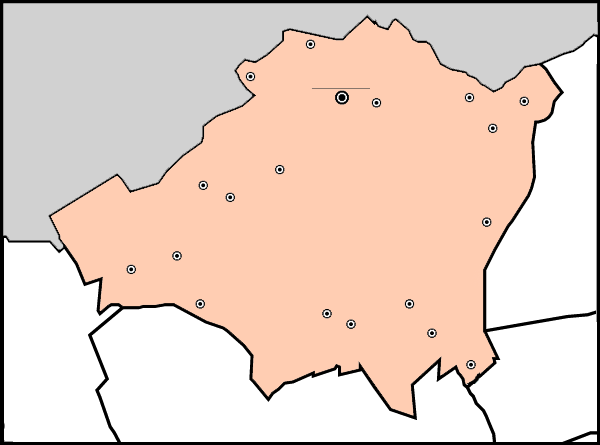

- Location within Vojvodina Location within Serbia Location within Europe
- Country: Serbia
- Province: Vojvodina
- District: North Bačka District
- Municipality: Subotica

Population (2022)
  - Total: 888
- Time zone: UTC+1 (CET)
  - Summer (DST): UTC+2 (CEST)

Ljutovo is a village located in the administrative area of the City of Subotica, in the North Bačka District, Vojvodina, Serbia. The village has a population of 888 people (2022 census).

== Name ==
In Serbian the village is known as Ljutovo or Љутово, in Bunjevac as Ljutovo or Mirgeš, in Croatian as Mirgeš (since 2009) or Ljutovo (before 2009), in Hungarian as Mérges, and in German as Bösendorf.

== Demographics ==
=== Historical population ===
- 1981: 1,411
- 1991: 1,182
- 2002: 1,181
- 2011: 1,067
- 2022: 888

=== Ethnic groups ===
According to data from the 2022 census, ethnic groups in the village include:

- 275 (31%) Bunjevci
- 238 (26.8%) Croats
- 113 (12.7%) Serbs
- 108 (12.1%) Hungarians
- Others/Undeclared/Unknown

== See also ==
- List of places in Serbia
- List of cities, towns and villages in Vojvodina
