= Mala Bosna, Subotica =

Mala Bosna Мала Босна (Serbian)
- Village (Selo)
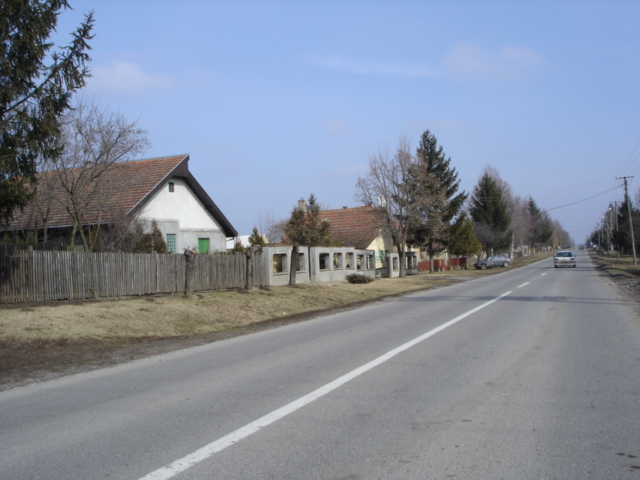
- Street detail in Mala Bosna

- Location within Vojvodina Location within Serbia Location within Europe
- Coordinates: 46°03′N 19°34′E
- Country: Serbia
- Province: Vojvodina

Population (2022)
  - Total: 909
- Time zone: UTC+1 (CET)
  - Summer (DST): UTC+2 (CEST)

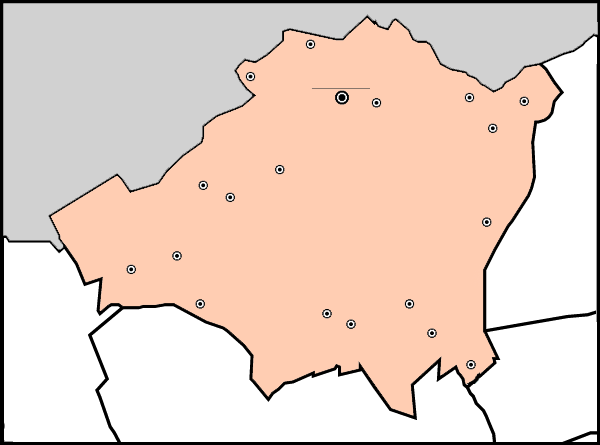

Mala Bosna (Serbian Cyrillic: Мала Босна) is a village located in the administrative area of the City of Subotica, in the North Bačka District, Vojvodina, Serbia. The village is ethnically mixed and its population numbering 909 people (2022 census).

== Name ==
In Serbo-Croatian the village is known as Мала Босна or Mala Bosna, and in Hungarian as Kisbosznia. Its name means "Little Bosnia" because of the local South Slavic inhabitants who originally migrated from Bosnia.

== Demographics ==
=== Historical population ===
- 1961: 2,883
- 1971: 2,318
- 1981: 1,835
- 1991: 1,488
- 2002: 1,245
- 2011: 1,082
- 2022: 909

=== Ethnic groups ===
According to data from the 2022 census, ethnic groups in the village include:

- 354 (38.9%) Croats
- 127 (14%) Bunjevci
- 89 (9.8%) Serbs
- 62 (6.8%) Hungarians
- Others/Undeclared/Unknown

== See also ==
- List of places in Serbia
- List of cities, towns and villages in Vojvodina
