= Stari Žednik =

Stari Žednik Стари Жедник (Serbian) Žednik (Croatian)
- Village (Selo)
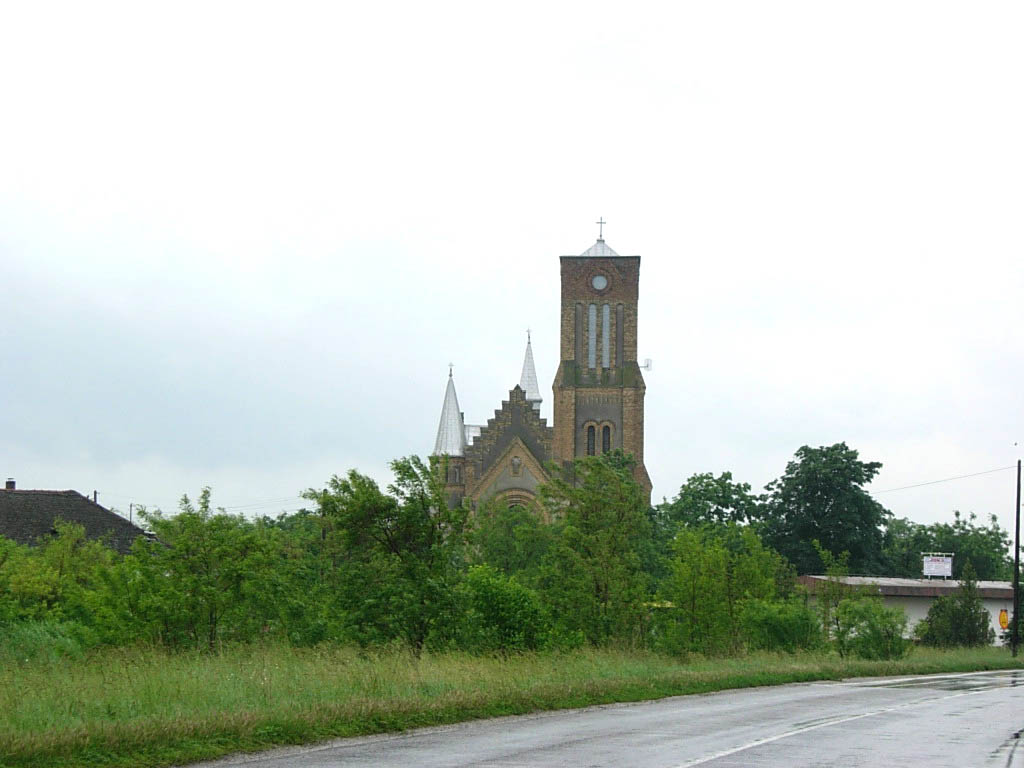
- The Saint Mark the Evangelist Catholic Church

- Location within Vojvodina Location within Serbia Location within Europe
- Coordinates: 45°57′N 19°38′E
- Country: Serbia
- Province: Vojvodina
- Time zone: UTC+1 (CET)
  - Summer (DST): UTC+2 (CEST)

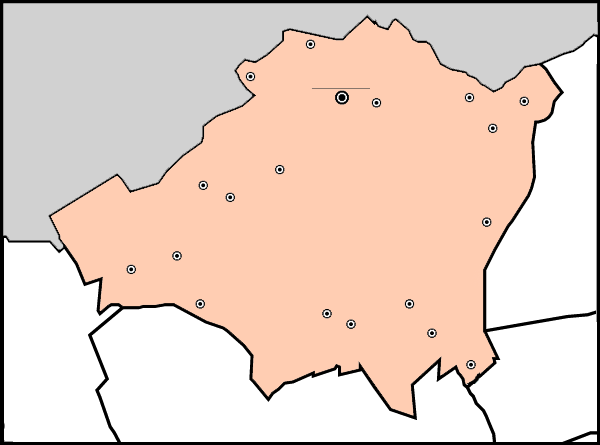

Stari Žednik is a village located in the administrative area of the City of Subotica, in the North Bačka District, Vojvodina, Serbia. The village has a population of 1,564 inhabitants (2022 census).

== Name ==
In Serbian, the village is known as Стари Жедник / Stari Žednik or Жедник / Žednik, in Croatian as Žednik (since 2009) or Stari Žednik (before 2009), in Hungarian as Nagyfény, and in Bunjevac as Stari Žednik or Žednik.

== Demographics ==
=== Historical population ===
- 1981: 2,472
- 1991: 2,323
- 2011: 1,961
- 2022: 1,564

=== Ethnic groups ===
According to data from the 2022 census, ethnic groups in the village include:

- 484 (30.9%) Croats
- 338 (21.6%) Hungarians
- 239 (15.3%) Serbs
- 197 (12.6%) Bunjevci
- Others/Undeclared/Unknown

== Tourist attractions ==
The Saint Mark the Evangelist Catholic Church was built by the plans of Zsigmond Moravetz, in neogothic style and opened in 1911. Its first parish priest was Hungarian Benjamin Hegedűs, and the current one is Croat Željko Šipek, who serves the Croatian and Hungarian communities.

== See also ==
- List of places in Serbia
- List of cities, towns and villages in Vojvodina
