= Gornji Tavankut =

Gornji Tavankut Горњи Таванкут (Serbian)
- Village (Selo)
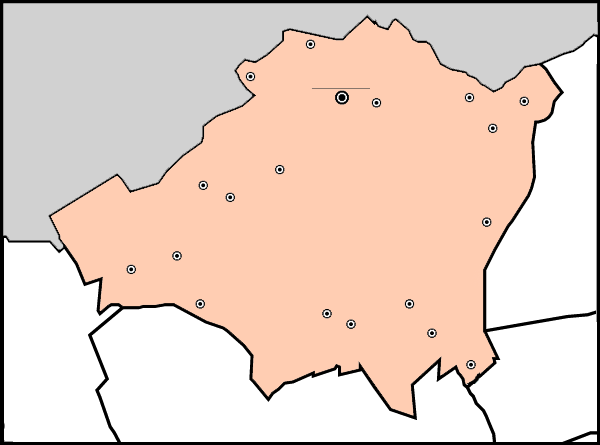

- Location within Vojvodina Location within Serbia Location within Europe
- Country: Serbia
- Province: Vojvodina
- District: North Bačka District
- Municipality: Subotica

Population (2022)
  - Total: 889
- Time zone: UTC+1 (CET)
  - Summer (DST): UTC+2 (CEST)

Gornji Tavankut is a village located in the administrative area of the City of Subotica, North Bačka District, Vojvodina, Serbia. The village has a population of 889 people (2022 census).

== Name ==
In Serbian the village is known as Gornji Tavankut or Горњи Таванкут, in Croatian as Gornji Tavankut, in Bunjevac as Gornji Tavankut, and in Hungarian as Felsőtavankút.

== Demographics ==
=== Historical population ===
- 1961: 7,476
- 1971: 6,729
- 1981: 1,879
- 1991: 1,526
- 2002: 1,381
- 2011: 1,097
- 2022: 889

=== Ethnic groups ===
According to data from the 2022 census, ethnic groups in the village include:

- 237 (26.6%) Bunjevci
- 227 (25.5%) Croats
- 66 (7.4%) Serbs
- 46 (5.1%) Hungarians
- Others/Undeclared/Unknown

== Geography ==
The village consists of several relatively distinct areas ('kraj'), such as Skenderovo, Vuković kraj, Partizan, Rata.

== See also ==
- Donji Tavankut
- List of places in Serbia
- List of cities, towns and villages in Vojvodina
