= Krsno ime =

Krsno ime is a South Slavic term that can refer to:

- Krsna slava, a ceremony commemorating family patron saints, primarily among Serbian Orthodox Christians
- Christian name or baptismal name, among all Christians
