= Donji Tavankut =

Donji Tavankut Доњи Таванкут (Serbian)
- Village (Selo)
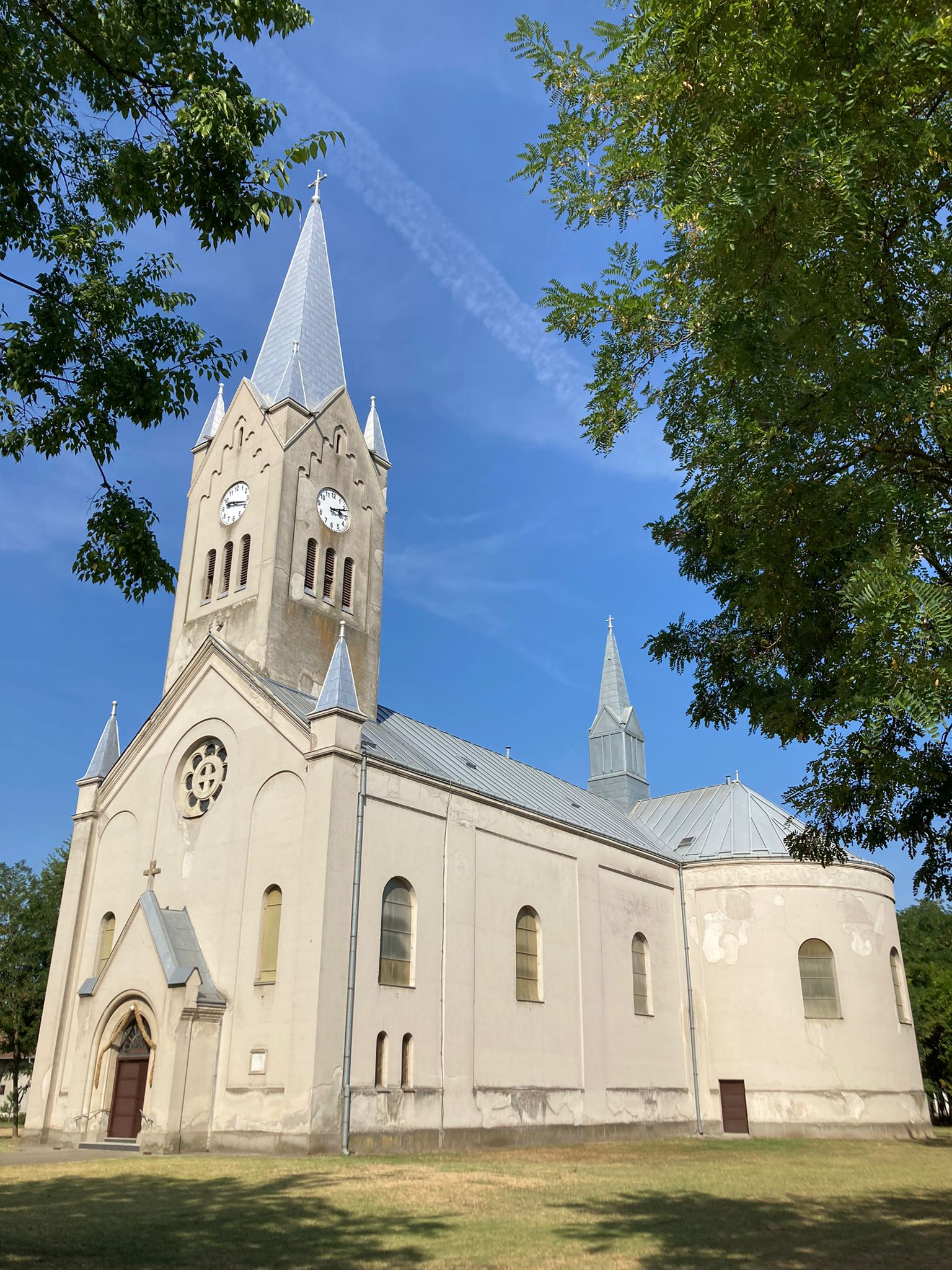
- Most Holy Heart of Jesus

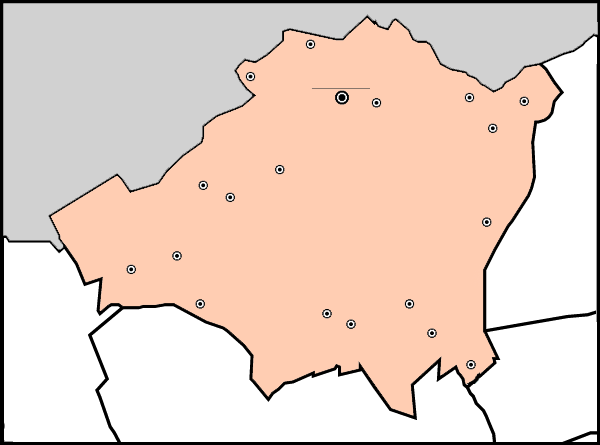

- Location within Vojvodina Location within Serbia Location within Europe
- Coordinates: 46.0478°N 19.4908°E
- Country: Serbia
- Province: Vojvodina

Population (2022)
  - Total: 1,969
- Time zone: UTC+1 (CET)
  - Summer (DST): UTC+2 (CEST)

Donji Tavankut (Serbian Cyrillic: Доњи Таванкут), also known simply as Tavankut (Таванкут), is a village located in the administrative area of the City of Subotica, North Bačka District, Vojvodina, Serbia. It has a population of 1,969 people (2022 census).

== Name ==
In Serbian the village is known as Donji Tavankut or Доњи Таванкут, in Croatian as Donji Tavankut and in Hungarian as Alsótavankút.

== Demographics ==
=== Historical population ===
- 1981: 2,719
- 1991: 2,710
- 2002: 2,631
- 2011: 2,327
- 2022: 1,969

=== Ethnic groups ===
According to data from the 2022 census, ethnic groups in the village include:

- 832 (42.2%) Croats
- 456 (23.1%) Bunjevci
- 151 (7.6%) Serbs
- 93 (4.7%) Hungarians
- Others/Undeclared/Unknown

== Geography ==
Tavankut includes several relatively separate smaller communities ("kraj"), such as Čikerija (or Čekerija), Sajc (or Nemirna ravnica), Vuković Kraj, Marinkić Kraj, Zlatni Kraj, Skenderovo, Dikanovac, Kaponja (or Kapunja).

== Features ==
It has two railway stations (Donji Tavankut and Skenderovo) on the railroad from Subotica to Sombor (and further to Bezdan, Apatin or Erdut). It also has a primary school (”Matija Gubec”), and football (soccer) club OFK Tavankut. The main pubs/cafés in Tavankut are: Tango, Teens, Jugoslavija (closed down), and Tri muve.

== See also ==
- Gornji Tavankut
- List of places in Serbia
- List of cities, towns and villages in Vojvodina
