= Bunjevac dialect =

Štokavian-Western Ikavian dialect

Bunjevac
- bunjevački
- Native to: Bosnia and Herzegovina, Croatia, Serbia, Hungary
- Native speakers: 3,319 (2022)
- Language family: Indo-European: Balto-Slavic; Slavic; South Slavic; Western; Shtokavian; Neo-Shtokavian; Younger Ikavian; Bunjevac

Language codes
- ISO 639-3: –
- Glottolog: bunj1247

The Bunjevac dialect (bunjevački dijalekt), also known as Bunjevac speech (bunjevački govor), is a Neo-Shtokavian Younger Ikavian dialect of the Serbo-Croatian pluricentric language, preserved among members of the Bunjevac community living mostly in region of Bačka of northern Serbia; Bács-Kiskun County (particularly in Baja and surroundings) of southern Hungary. It is also found in Croatia (Primorje-Gorski Kotar County, Lika-Senj County, Split-Dalmatia County, Osijek-Baranja County, Vukovar-Srijem County); and in Bosnia-Herzegovina. They presumably originate from western Herzegovina. Their accent is purely Ikavian, with /i/ for the Common Slavic vowels yat.

Bunjevac dialect is one of the official languages in the City of Subotica, since 2021. That same year, Croatia added the Bunjevac dialect to the list of protected intangible cultural heritage. Within the Bunjevac community itself as well as between Serbia and Croatia there is an ongoing debate about the status of Bunjevac speech.

== Dictionary ==
There have been three meritorious people who preserved the Bunjevac dialect in two separate dictionaries: Grgo Bačlija and Marko Peić with "Rečnik bački Bunjevaca" (editions 1990, 2018), and Ante Sekulić with "Rječnik govora bačkih Hrvata" (2005).

- "Bunjevac dialect of the hinterland of Senje with special consideiration of emphasis." Grga Tomljenović. Croatia. 1984
- Bunjevac phrases and proverbs in Gara, Hungary. "Bunjevačke fraze i poslovice u Gari". Tomislav Krekić. 2016
- Bunjevac speech in Tavankut, Serbia. "Govor Tavankuta". Mirjana Crnković. 2015
- "Leksikonu podunavskih Hrvata – Bunjevaca i Šokaca (1-16)". Hrvatsko akademsko društvo Subotica. 2024
- "Objavljen 16. svezak Leksikona. 2023." Slaven Bačić, Mario Bara, Ladislav Heka, Eduard Hemar, Stevan Mačković, Petar Vuković

== Number of speakers ==
According to data from the 2022 Serbian, 3,319 people declared Bunjevac as their mother tongue. Serbian census questionnaire lists Bunjevac dialect as Bunjevac language thus contradicting with the official stance of both the Serbian government and Matica Srpska, that classifies Bunjevac speech as a dialect.

== Status ==
Map of Shtokavian dialects, the prestige dialect of the pluricentric Serbo-Croatian language and the basis of its Serbian, Croatian, Bosnian, and Montenegrin standards, as well as for sub-dialects

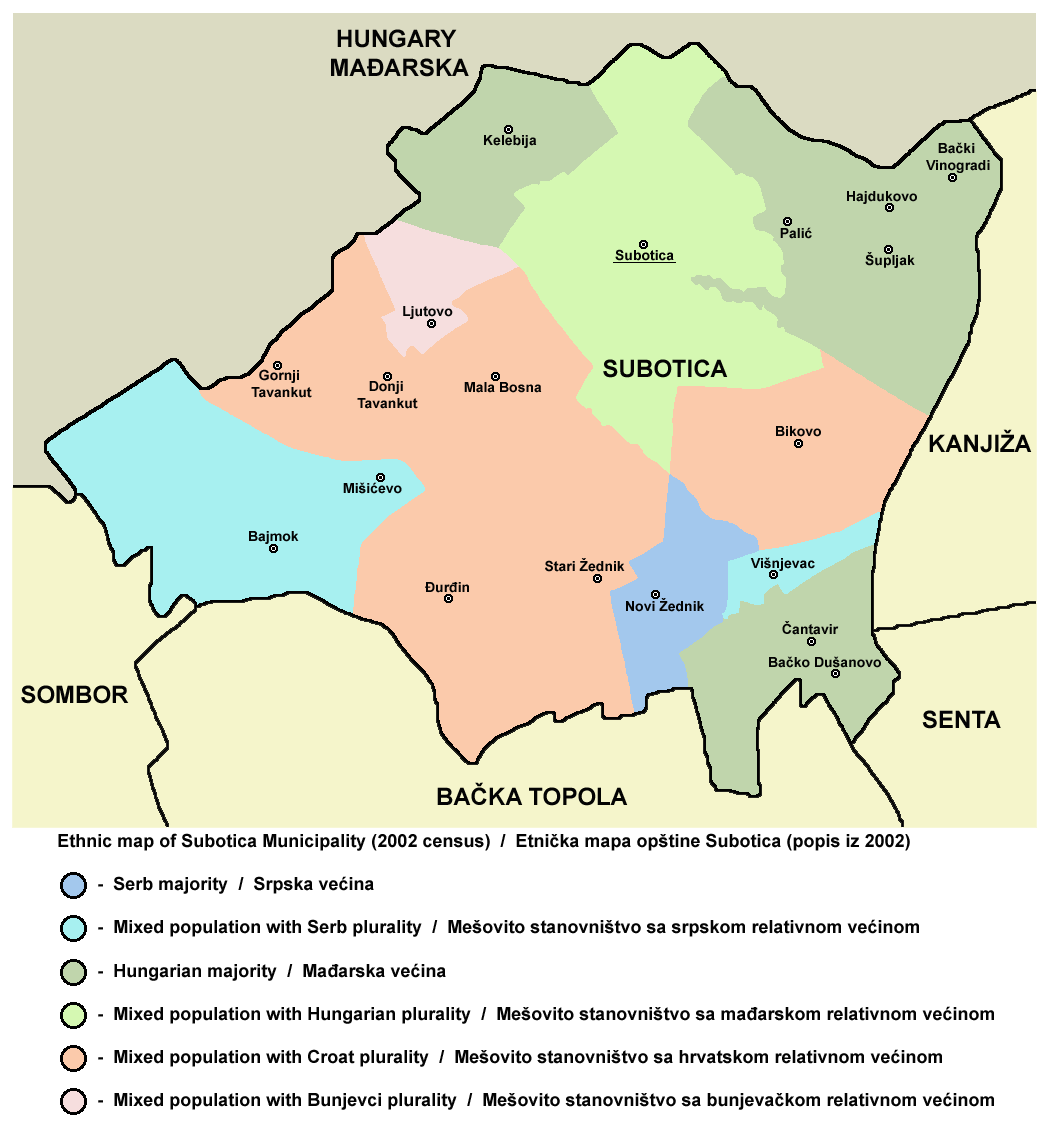
Ethnic map of the administrative area of the City of Subotica showing e.g. villages with Bunjevac ethnic majority

Opinions on the status of the Bunjevac dialect remain divided. Bunjevac speech is considered a dialect or vernacular of the Serbo-Croatian pluricentric language, by linguists, and part of the southern Slavic dialect continuum. It is noted by Andrew Hodges that it is mutually intelligible with the standard Serbian and Croatian varieties. Popularly, the Bunjevac dialect is often referred to as "Bunjevac language" (bunjevački jezik) or Bunjevac mother tongue (bunjevački materni jezik). At the political level, depending on goal and content of the political lobby, the general confusion concerning the definition of the terms language, dialect, speech, mother tongue, is cleverly exploited, resulting in an inconsistent use of the terms.

In the old Austro-Hungarian censuses, Bunjevac was declared as a native language of numerous citizens (for example in the city of Subotica 33,247 people declared Bunjevac as their native language in 1910). During the existence of the Kingdom of Yugoslavia and the Socialist Federal Republic of Yugoslavia, members of the Bunjevac ethnic community mostly declared themselves as speaking Serbo-Croatian.

According to data from the 2002 Serbian census, many members of the Bunjevac community declared their native language to be either Serbian or Croatian. This does not mean that they do not use this specific dialect, but merely that they ddin't consider it at the time sufficiently distinct from the aforementioned standard languages to register as speakers of a separate language. However, those Bunjevci who declared Bunjevac to be their native language consider it a separate language.

There is an ongoing effort among the members of the Bunjevac community for affirmation of their dialect in Serbia, Croatia, and Hungary.

The dialect of the Bunjevci in Serbia was standardised in 2018 and officially approved as a standard dialect by the Serbian Ministry of Education for teaching in schools. With the standardisation of the Bunjevac dialect, activists and members of the National Council of the Bunjevac Minority are striving for language secession, with the eventual goal of the Bunjevac dialect gaining the political-linguistic status of separate language in Serbia or the status of a so-called microlanguage (bunjevački mikro jezik). Theodora Vuković has provided, in 2009, the scientific methodology for the finalization of the standardisation process of the Bunjevac dialect corpus in Serbia, classified as the Serbian Bunjevac dialect variety of the Danubian branch of the Neo-Shtokavian Younger Ikavian dialect. Speakers use in general the standardised dialect variety for writing and conversation in formal situations.

The National Council of the Bunjevac Minority finance the following projects in Bunjevac dialect: monthly newspaper "Bunjevačke novine", TV programme "Spektar" (broadcast by regional public proadcaster Radio Television of Vojvodina), and a language school program for Bunjevac dialect and culture "Bunjevački govor s elementima nacionalne kulture". The Croat National Council in Subotica is organizing the yearly Bunjevac Song Contest "Festival bunjevački' pisama"

In 2021, the city council of Subotica has voted in favor of amending the city statute adding Bunjevac dialect to the list of official languages in the municipality, in addition to Serbian, Hungarian, and Croatian.

The Institute of Croatian Language and Linguistics proposed in 2021 to the Croatian Ministry of Culture to add Bunjevac dialect to the List of Protected Intangible Cultural Heritage of Croatia and was approved on later that year — the three Bunjevac dialect branches, Danubian (also known as Bunjevac), Littoral-Lika, and Dalmatian (also known as Bosnian–Dalmatian), are categorized as neo-Shtokavian Ikavian dialects of the Croatian language.

The status of the Bunjevac dialect and the identity and ethnicity dispute of people calling themselves Bunjevac or Bunjevac-Croat, has been on the political agenda of stakeholders involved for decades, influencing bilateral cooperation between Croatia and Serbia, domestic political developments in Serbia and Croatia, and the implementation of political decisions of the EU.

== Organisations ==
- Bunjevac Croatian Cultural and Educational Society in Serbia
- Bunjevac Cultural Institute, "Bunyevác Kulturális Intézet" in Baja in Hungary
- Bunjevac National Council in Serbia
- Bunjevačka matica (under auspices of Bunjevac National Council)
- Bunjevci, "Vrilo mudrosti" in Slavonski Brod in Croatia
- Croat National Council in Serbia (Bunjevci, Coats, Šokci)
- Croatian Cultural Centre "Bunjevačko kolo" for Croats, Bunjevci, and Sokci in Serbia
- HKC Bunjevacko kolo
- Ogranak Matice hrvatske u Subotici
