= Bačko Dušanovo =

Bačko Dušanovo Бачко Душаново (Serbian) Zentaörs (Hungarian)
- Village (Selo)
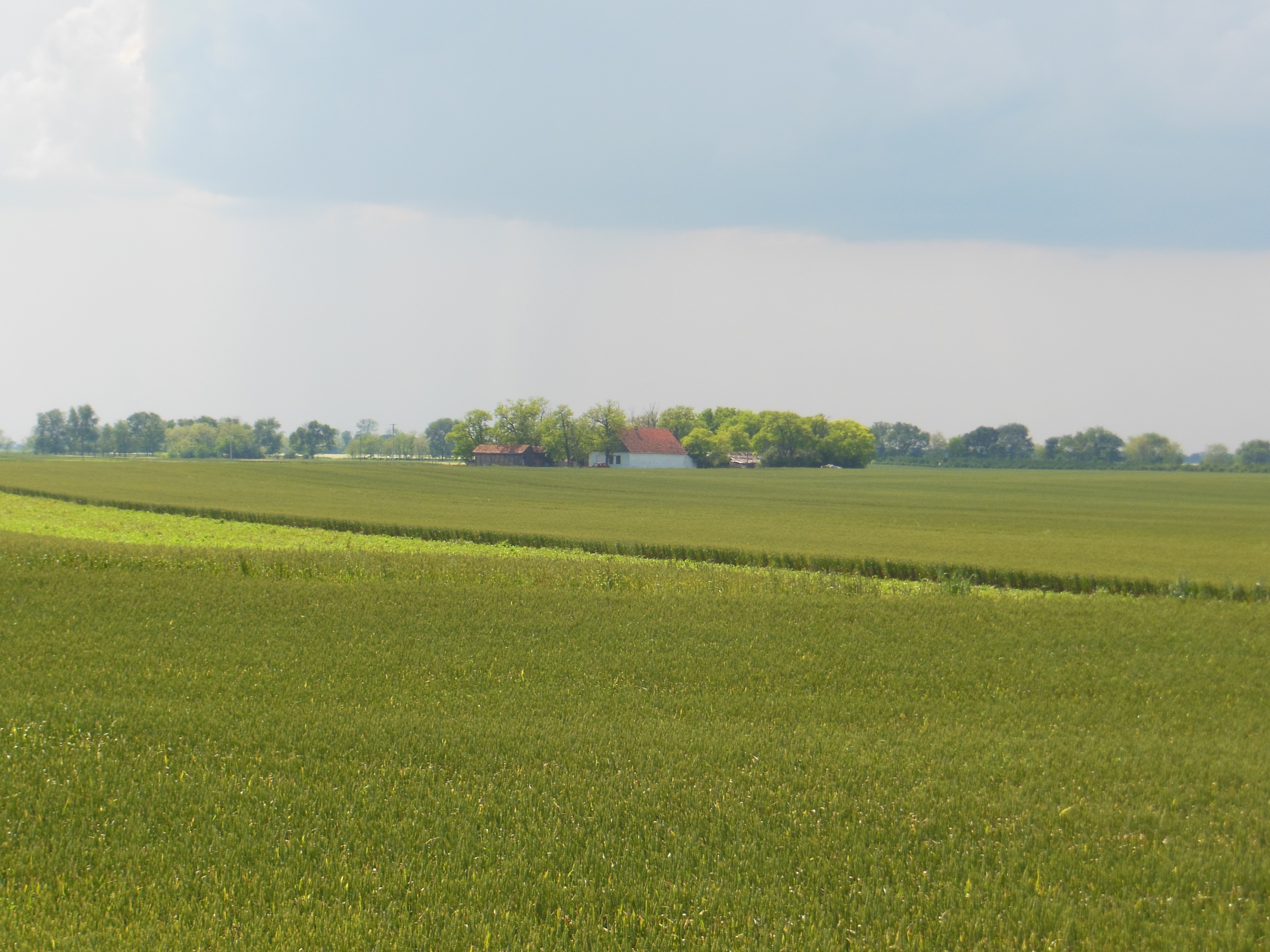
- View of the village

- Location within Vojvodina Location within Serbia Location within Europe
- Coordinates: 45°54′N 19°47′E
- Country: Serbia
- Province: Vojvodina

Population (2022)
  - Total: 523
- Time zone: UTC+1 (CET)
  - Summer (DST): UTC+2 (CEST)

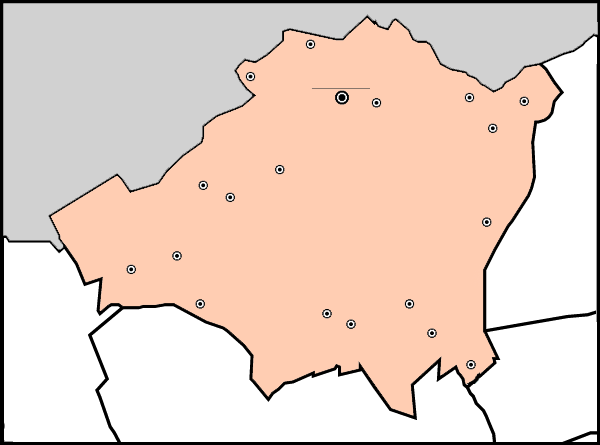

Bačko Dušanovo (Serbian Cyrillic: Бачко Душаново; Hungarian: Zentaörs) is a village located in the administrative area of the City of Subotica, North Bačka District, Vojvodina, Serbia. The village has a population of 523 people (2002 census).

== Demographics ==
=== Historical population ===
- 1961: 1,011
- 1971: 938
- 1981: 839
- 1991: 785
- 2002: 741
- 2011: 627
- 2022: 523

=== Ethnic groups ===
According to data from the 2022 census, ethnic groups in the village include:

- 341 (65.2%) Hungarians
- 127 (24.3%) Serbs
- Others/Undeclared/Unknown

== See also ==
- List of places in Serbia
- List of cities, towns and villages in Vojvodina
