= Subotica =

City in the province of Vojvodina, Serbia

Subotica Суботица (Serbian) Szabadka (Hungarian) Subotica (Croatian) Subatica (Bunjevac)
- City
- Град Суботица; Grad Subotica; City of Subotica
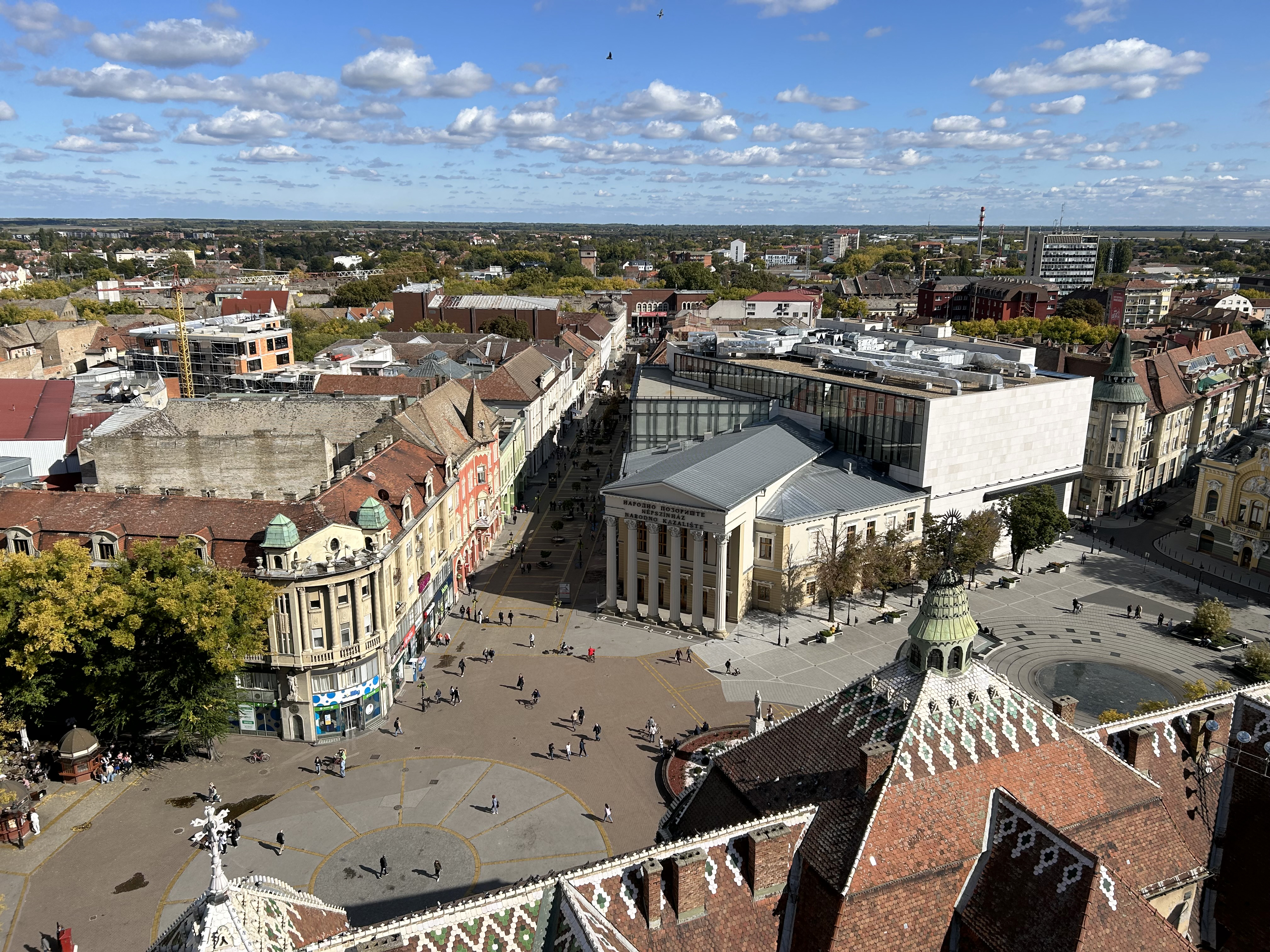
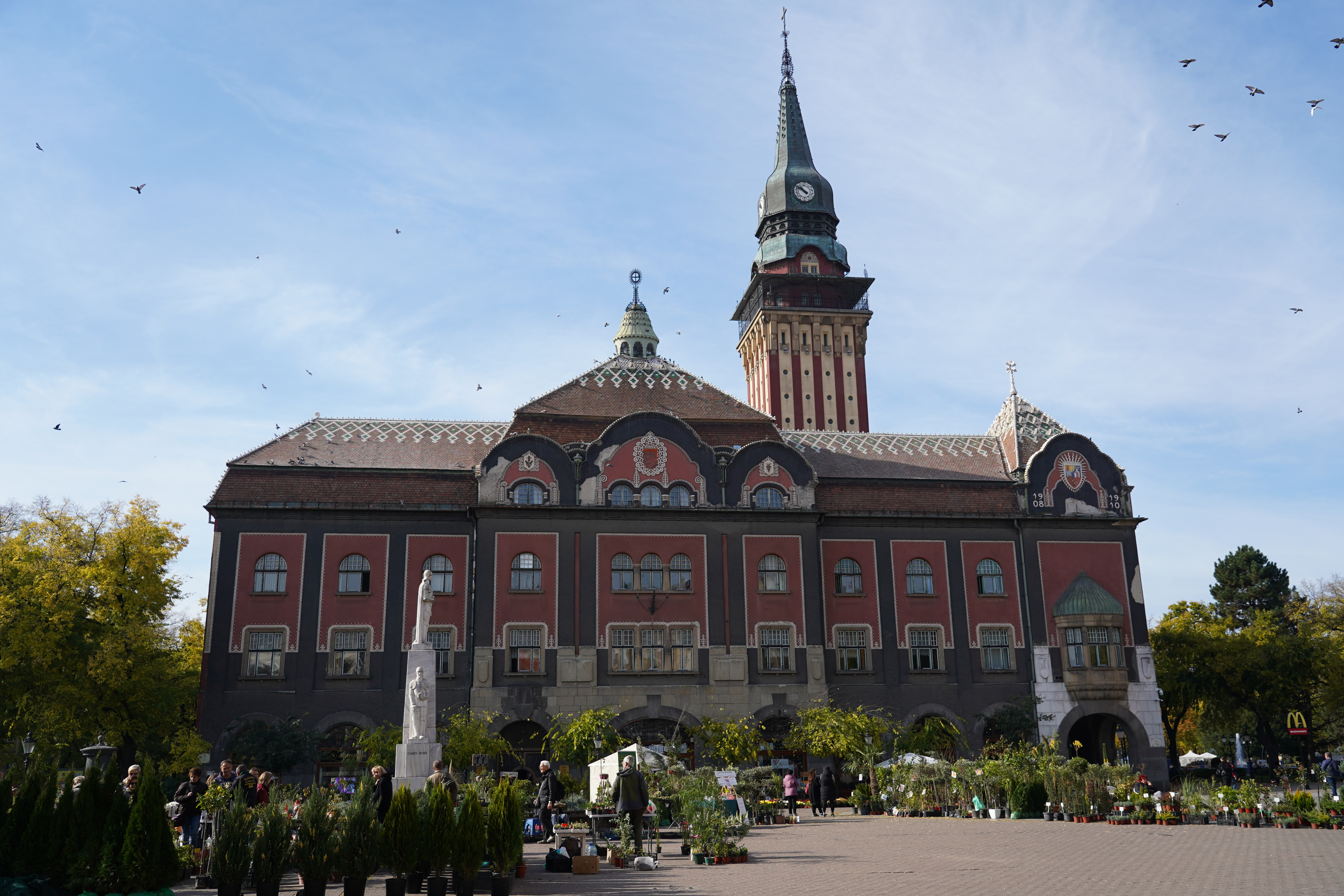
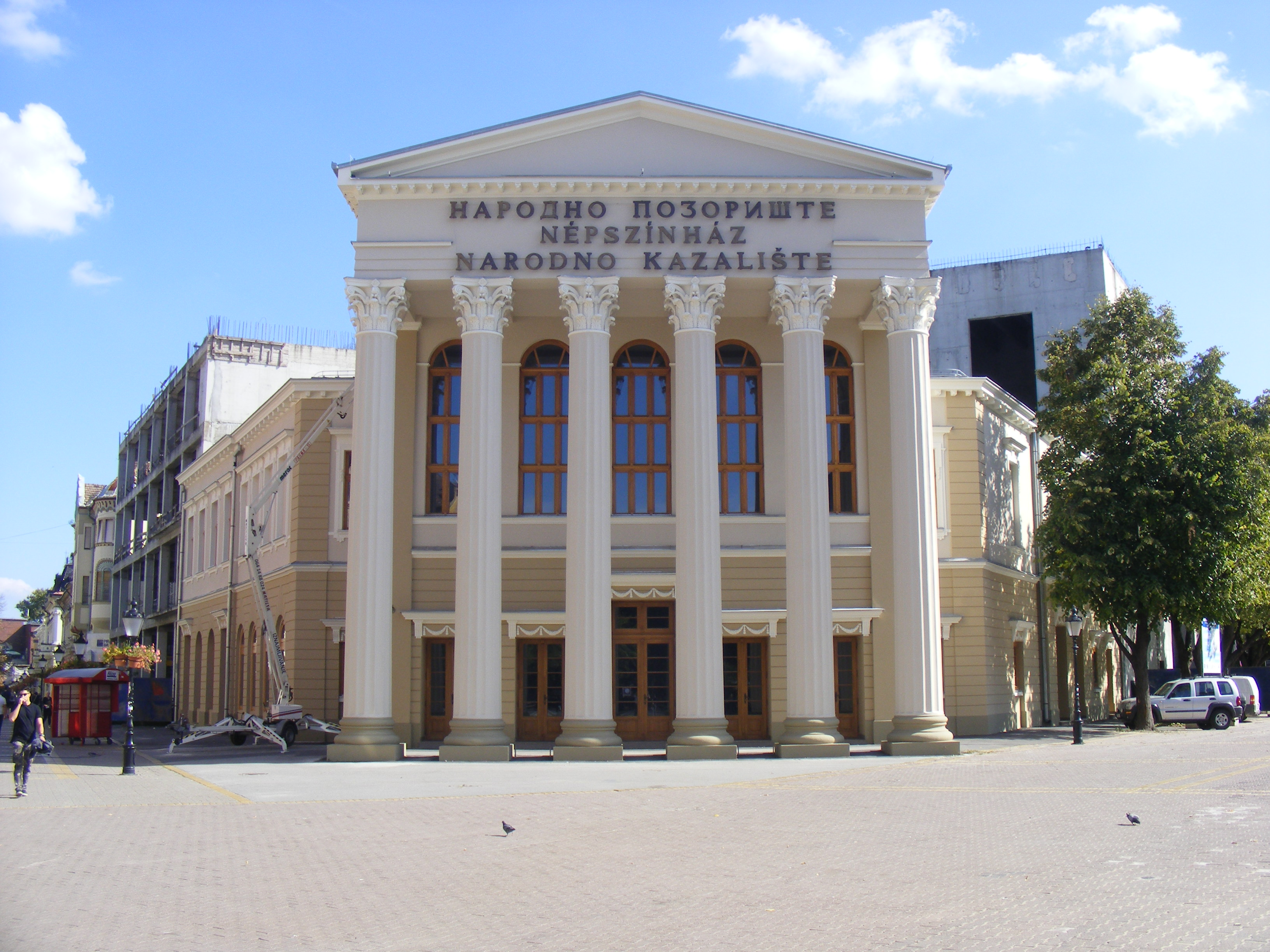
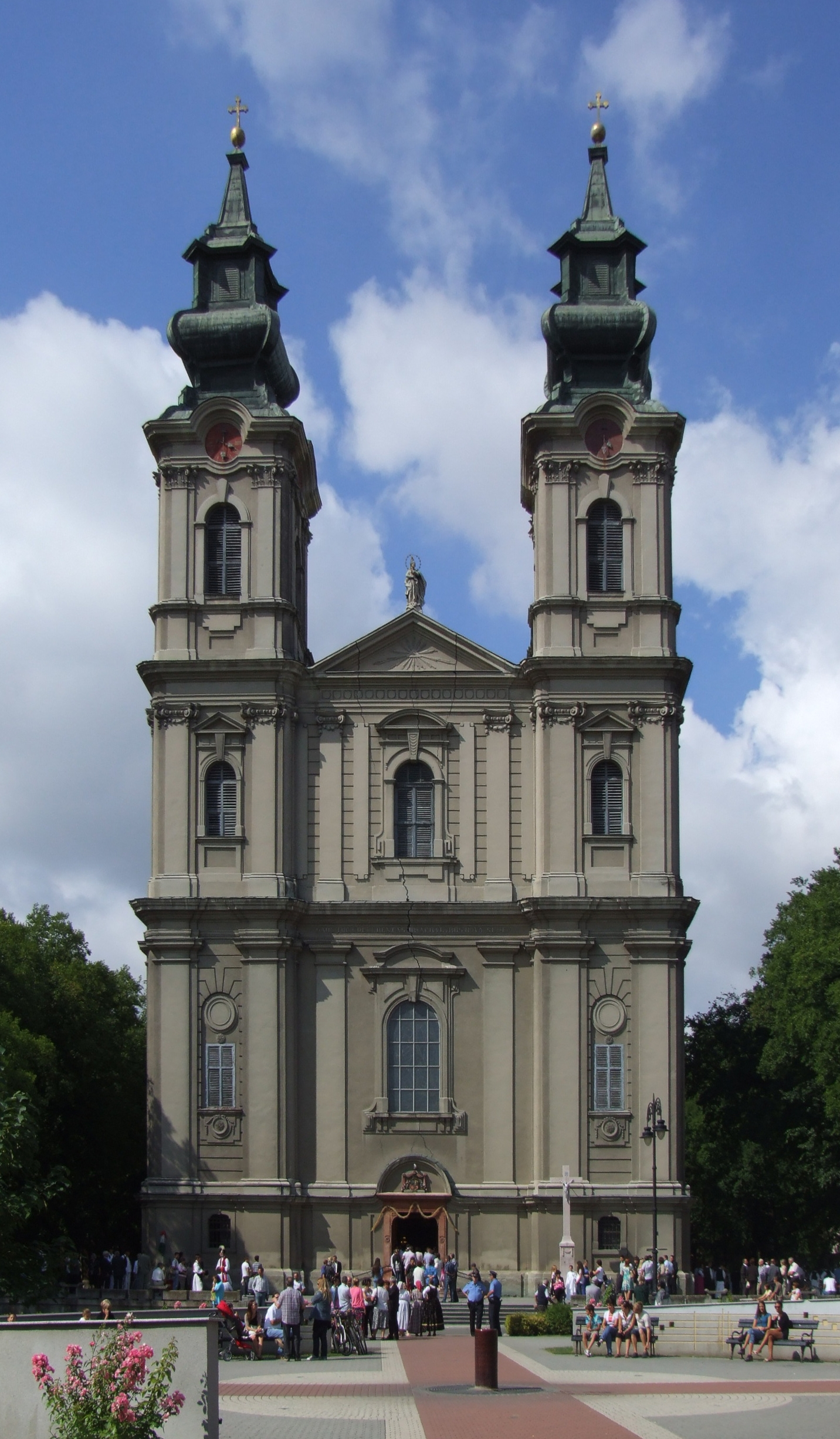
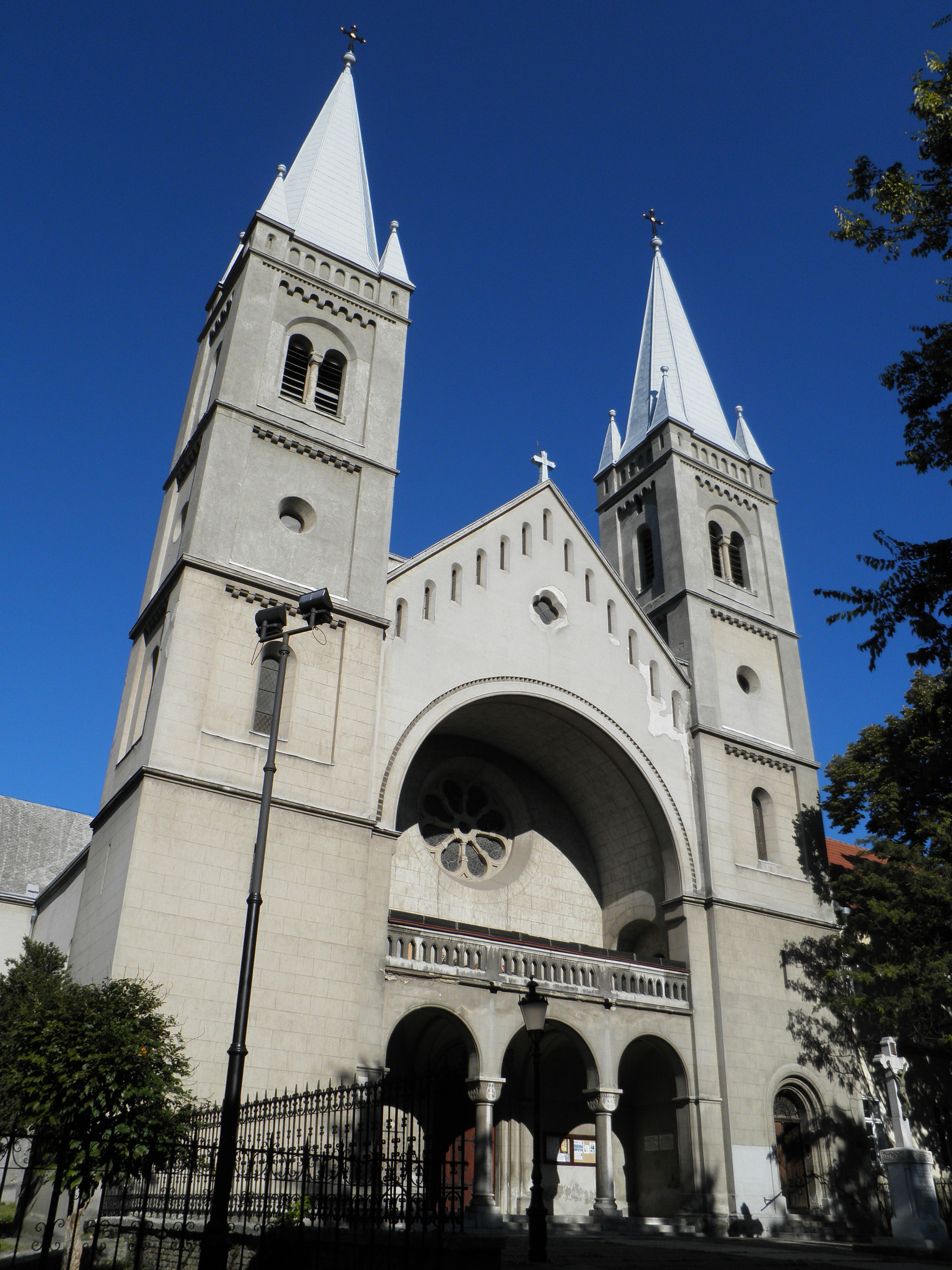
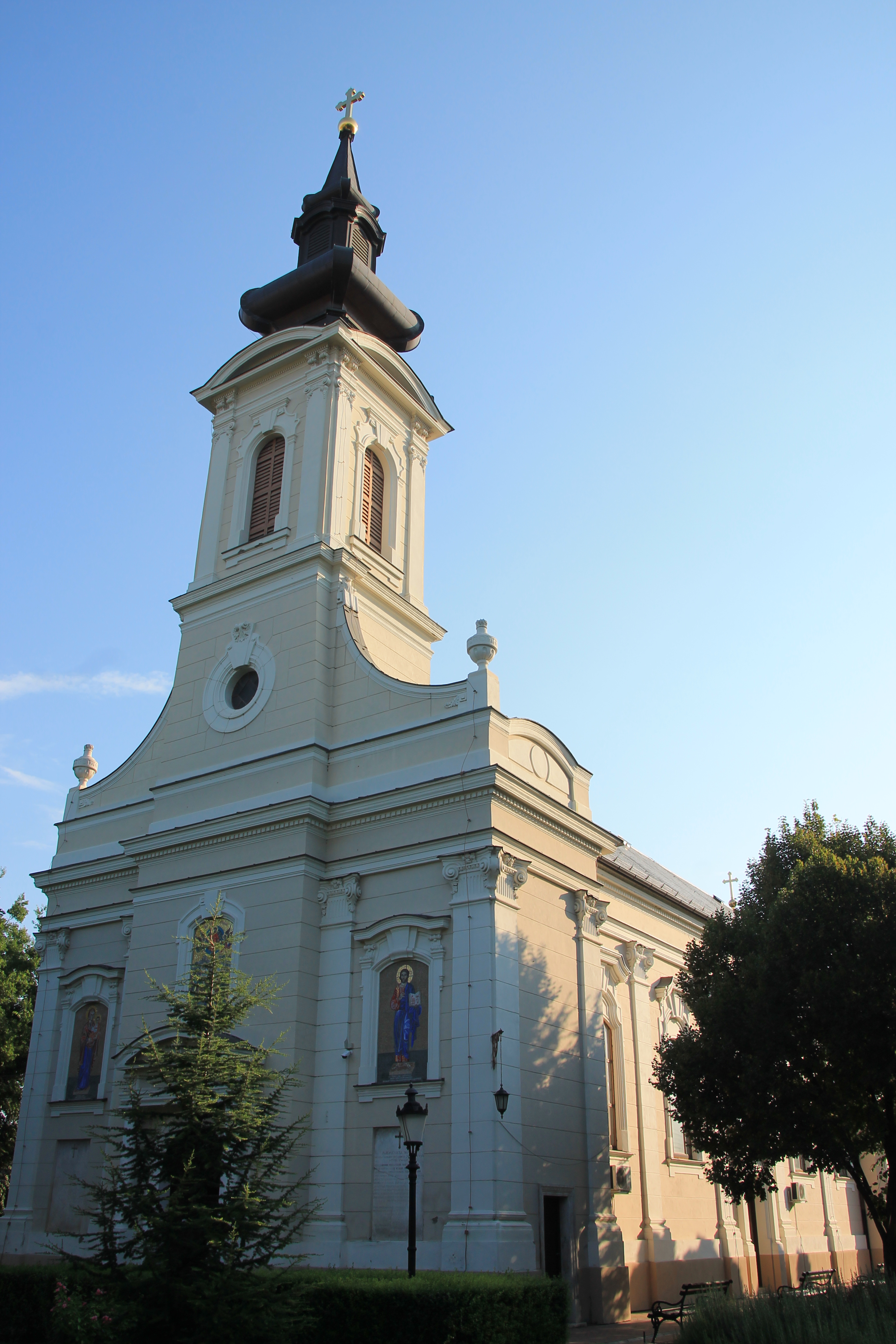
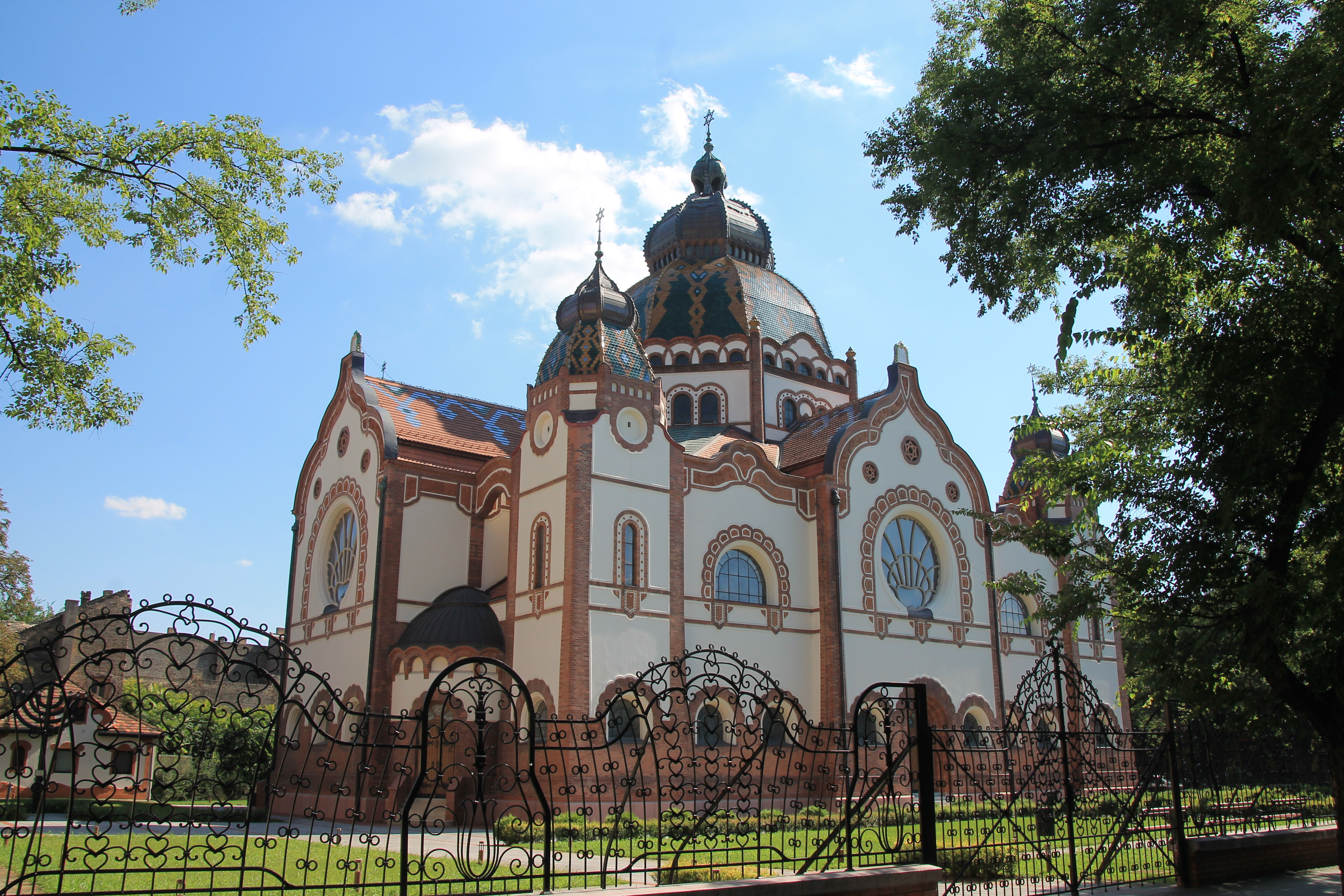
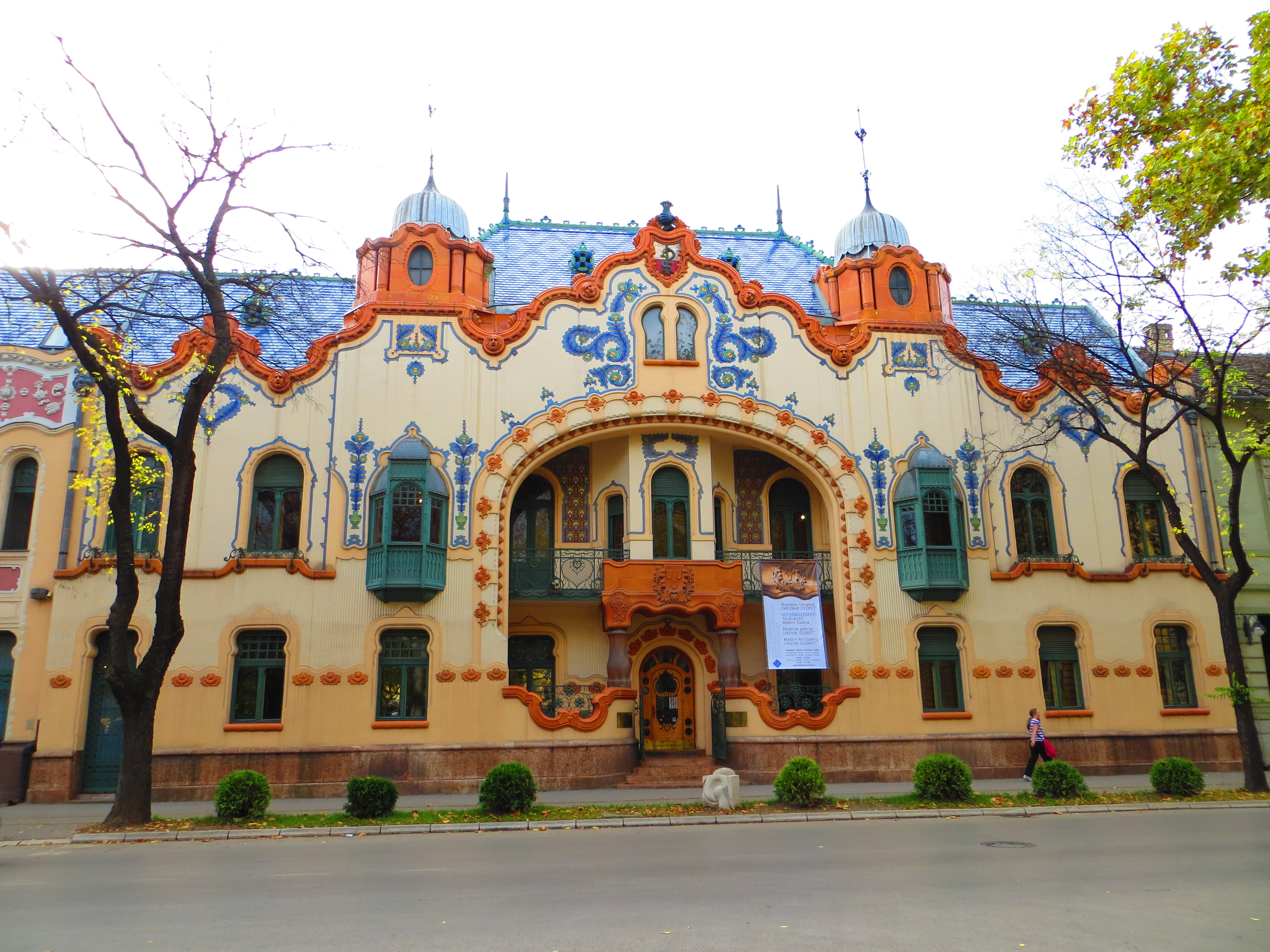
- The Freedom Square Subotica City Hall National Theater Subotica Cathedral Franciscan Church Ascencion Church Subotica Synagogue Raichle's Palace

- Flag Coat of arms

- Location within Vojvodina Location within Serbia Location within Europe
- Coordinates: 46°06′01″N 19°39′56″E
- Country: Serbia
- Province: Vojvodina
- District: North Bačka
- Settlements: 19

Government
  - Mayor: Nenad Kozomora (SNS)

Area
  - Rank: 13th in Serbia
  - Urban: 164.33 km^{2} (63.45 sq mi)
  - Administrative: 1,007.47 km^{2} (388.99 sq mi)
- Elevation: 109 m (358 ft)

Population (2022 census)
  - City: 88,752
  - Rank: 5th in Serbia
  - Administrative: 123,952
  - Administrative density: 123.033/km^{2} (318.654/sq mi)
- Time zone: UTC+1 (CET)
  - Summer (DST): UTC+2 (CEST)
- Postal code: 24000
- Area code: (+381) 24
- Vehicle registration: SU
- Official languages: Serbian together with Hungarian, Croatian and Bunjevac
- Website: subotica.rs

Subotica (Serbian Cyrillic: Суботица, pronounced [sǔbotitsa]; Hungarian: Szabadka, pronounced [ˈsɒbɒtkɒ]) is a city in Central Europe and the administrative center of the North Bačka District in the autonomous province of Vojvodina, Serbia. Formerly the largest city of Vojvodina region, contemporary Subotica is now the second largest city in the province, as well as in the Serbian part of the Bačka geographical region, following the city of Novi Sad. It is the fifth largest city in Serbia, having - according to the 2022 census - a population of 88,752 (the city proper, while the population of the administrative area of the city stands at 123,952 people).

== Name ==
The name of the city has changed frequently over time. The earliest known written name of the city was Zabotka or Zabatka, which dates from 1391. It is the origin of the current Hungarian name for the city "Szabadka". According to Skok, Szabadka originated from sobotka, a Slavic diminutive of sobota, meaning "a place that had a market fair on Saturday" (like Szombathely or Nagyszombat), but its ending -ka was later replaced with -ica, another Slavic diminutive, by the Bunjevci. Other sources claim that the name "Szabadka" comes from the adjective szabad, which derived from the Slavic word for "free" – svobod, referring to the status of the colonists settled in this zone by the Habsburg after the Battle of Zenta.

The town was named in the 1740s after Maria Theresa of Austria, Archduchess of Austria. It was officially called Sent-Maria in 1743, but was renamed in 1779 as Maria-Theresiapolis. These two official names were also spelled in several different ways (most commonly the German Maria-Theresiopel or Theresiopel), and were used in different languages.

The name is also rendered as Szabadka (Hungarian) and Subatica (Bunjevac).

== History ==
Historical affiliations

Kingdom of Hungary c. 1301–1526
Ottoman Empire 1542–1686
Habsburg monarchy 1686–1804
Austrian Empire 1804–1867
Austro-Hungarian Empire 1867–1918
Kingdom of Serbia 1918
Kingdom of Yugoslavia 1918–1941
Hungarian occupation of Yugoslavia 1941–1944
SFR Yugoslavia 1944–1992
Federal Republic of Yugoslavia 1992−2003
Serbia and Montenegro 2003–2006
Republic of Serbia 2006–present

=== Prehistory and antiquity ===
In the Neolithic and Eneolithic periods, several important archaeological cultures flourished in this area, including the Starčevo culture, the Vinča culture, and the Tiszapolgár culture. Early Indo-European peoples settled in the territory of present-day Subotica in 3200 BC. During the Eneolithic period, the Bronze Age and the Iron Age, several Indo-European archaeological cultures included areas around Subotica - the Baden culture, the Vučedol culture, the Urnfield culture and some others. Before the Iazyge conquest in the 1st century BC, Indo-European peoples of Illyrian, Celtic and Dacian descent inhabited this area. In the 3rd century BC, this area was controlled by the Celtic Boii and Eravisci, while in the 1st century BC, it became part of the Dacian kingdom. From the 1st century BC, the area came under the control of the Sarmatian Iazyges, who were sometimes allies and sometimes enemies of the Romans. Iazyge rule lasted until the 4th century AD, after which the region came into the possession of various other peoples and states.

=== Early Middle Ages and Slavic settlement ===
In the Early Middle Ages various Indo-European and Turkic peoples and states ruled in the area of Subotica. These peoples included Huns, Gepids, Avars, Slavs and Bulgarians. Slavs settled today's Subotica in the 6th and 7th centuries, before some of them crossed the rivers Sava and Danube and settled in the Balkans.

The Slavic tribe living in the territory of present-day Subotica were the Obotrites, a subgroup of the Serbs. In the 9th century, after the fall of the Avar state, the first forms of Slavic statehood emerged in this area. The first Slavic states that ruled over this region included the Principality of Lower Pannonia (846-875), Great Moravia (833–c. 907) and the Bulgarian Empire.

=== Late Middle Ages ===
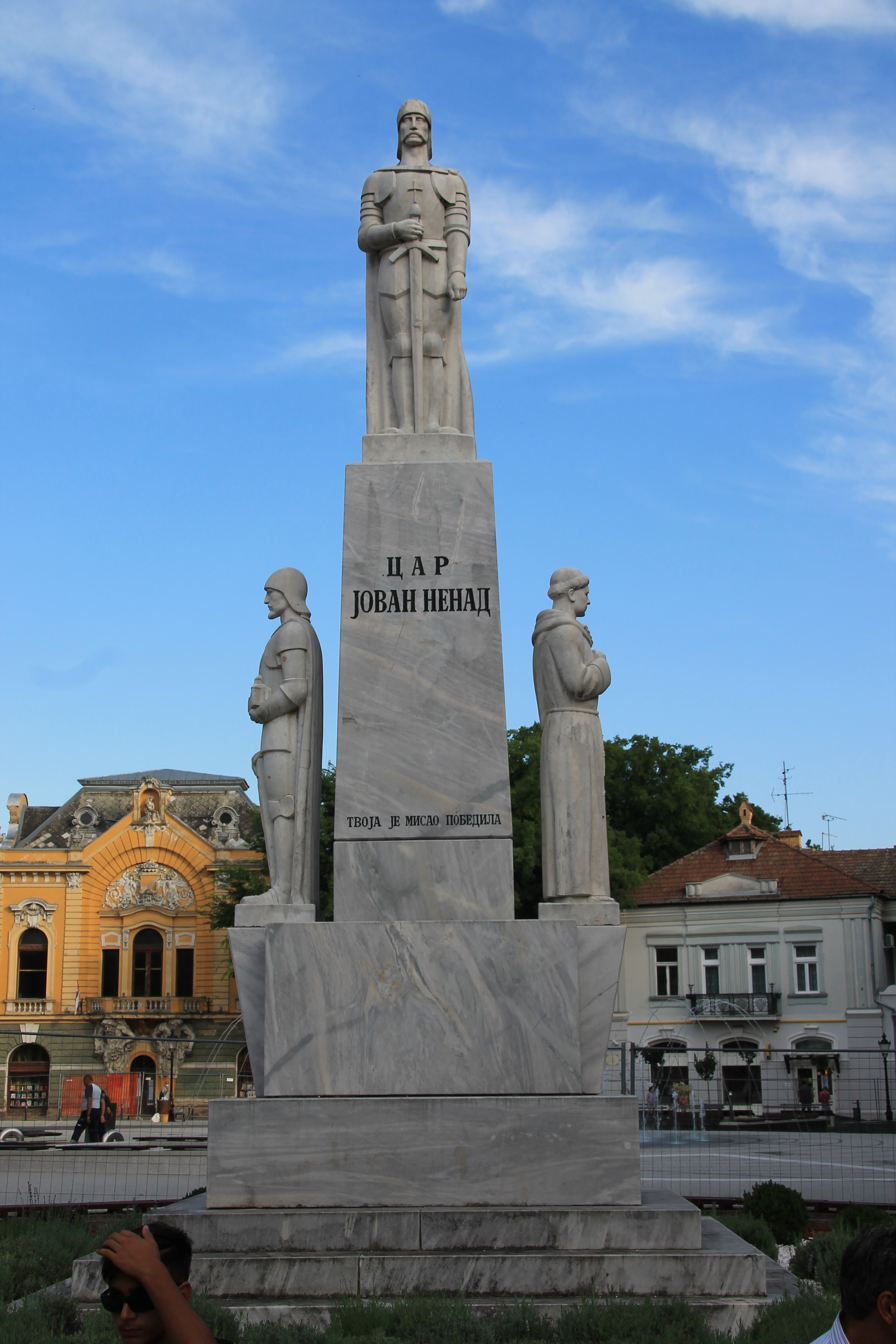
Emperor Jovan Nenad monument in the downtown

Subotica probably first became a settlement of note when people poured into it from nearby villages destroyed during the Tatar invasions of 1241–42. When Zabadka/Zabatka was first recorded in 1391, it was a tiny town in the medieval Kingdom of Hungary. Later, the city belonged to the Hunyadis, one of the most influential aristocratic families in the whole of Central Europe.

King Matthias Corvinus of Hungary gave the town to one of his relatives, János Pongrác Dengelegi, who, fearing an invasion by the Ottoman Empire, fortified the castle of Subotica, erecting a fortress in 1470. Some decades later, after the Battle of Mohács in 1526, Subotica became part of the Ottoman Empire. The majority of the Hungarian population fled northward to Royal Hungary. Bálint Török, a local noble who had ruled over Subotica, also escaped from the city. During the military and political havoc following the defeat at Mohács, Subotica came under the control of Serbian mercenaries recruited in Banat. These soldiers were in the service of the Transylvanian general John I Zápolya, a later Hungarian king.

The leader of these mercenaries, Jovan Nenad, established in 1526–27 his rule in Bačka, northern Banat and a small part of Syrmia and created an independent entity, with Subotica as its administrative centre. At the peak of his power, Jovan Nenad proclaimed himself as Serbian tsar in Subotica. He named Radoslav Čelnik as the general commander of his army, while his treasurer and palatine was Subota Vrlić, a Serbian noble from Jagodina. When Bálint Török returned and recaptured Subotica from the Serbs, Jovan Nenad moved the administrative centre to Szeged.

Some months later, in the summer of 1527, Jovan Nenad was assassinated and his entity collapsed. However, after Jovan Nenad's death, Radoslav Čelnik led a part of the army to Ottoman Syrmia, where he briefly ruled as an Ottoman vassal.

=== Ottoman Empire ===
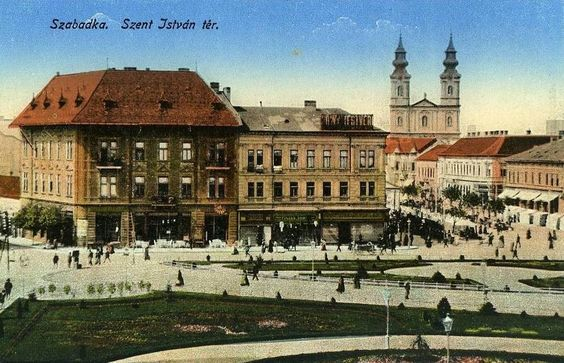
Subotica 1900.

The Ottoman Empire ruled the city from 1542 to 1686. At the end of this almost 150-year-long period, not much remained of the old town of Zabadka/Zabatka. As much of the population had fled, the Ottomans encouraged the settlement of the area by different colonists from the Balkans. The settlers were mostly Orthodox Serbs. They cultivated the extremely fertile land around Subotica. In 1570, the population of Subotica numbered 49 houses, and in 1590, 63 houses. In 1687, the region was settled by Catholic Dalmatas (called Bunjevci today). It was called Sobotka under Ottoman rule and was a kaza centre in Segedin sanjak at first in Budin Eyaleti until 1596, and after that in Eğri Eyaleti between 1596 and 1686.

=== Habsburg Monarchy ===
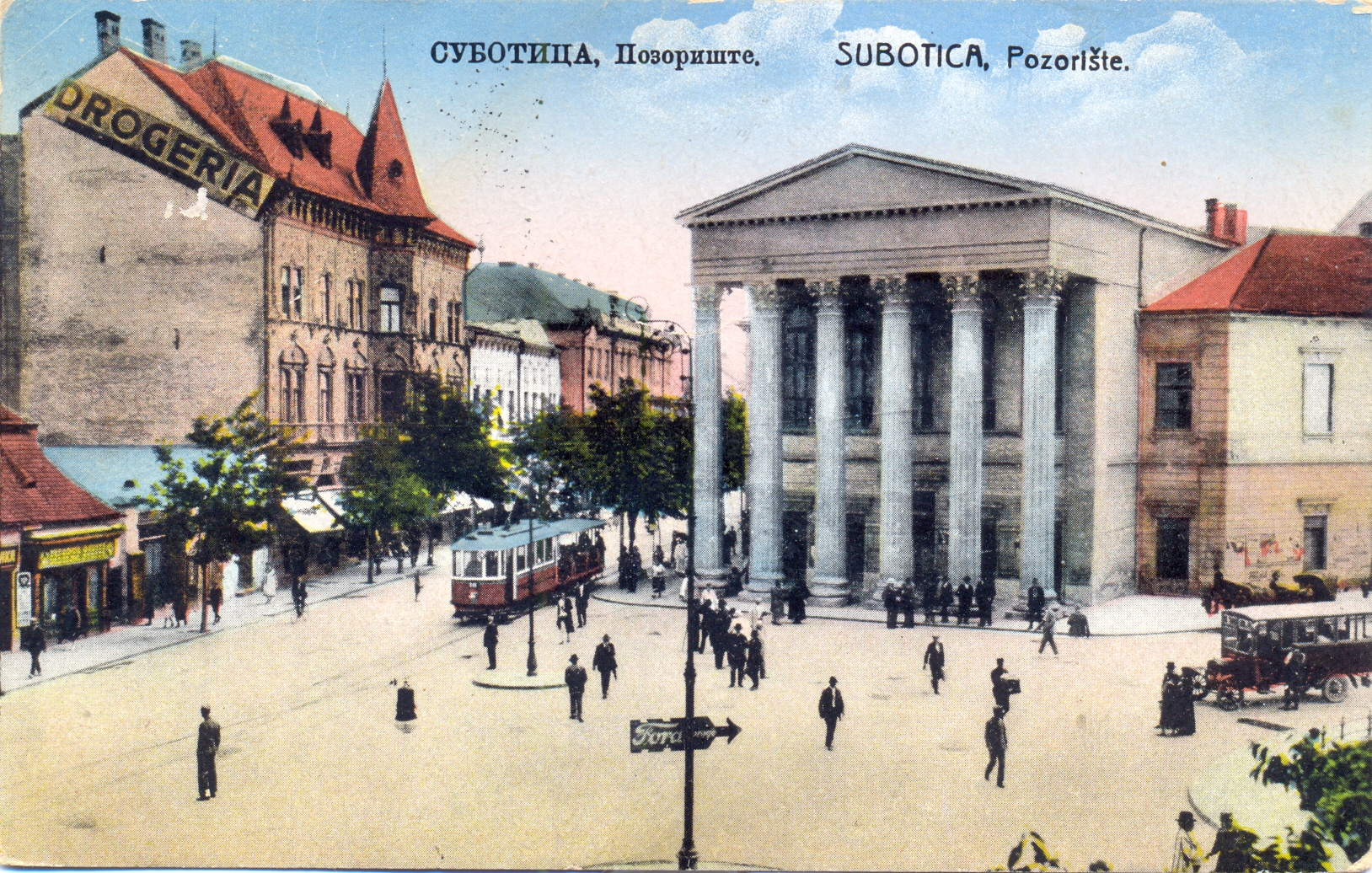
Subotica in Serbian early 20th-century postcard

In 1687, about 5,000 Bunjevci settled in Bačka (including Subotica). After the decisive battle against the Ottomans at Senta led by Prince Eugene of Savoy on 11 September 1697, Subotica became part of the military border zone Theiss-Mieresch established by the Habsburg monarchy. In the meantime the uprising of Francis II Rákóczi broke out, which is also known as the Kuruc War.

In the region of Subotica, Rákóczi joined battle against the Rac National Militia. Rác was a designation for the South Slavic people (mostly Serbs and Bunjevci) and they often were referred to as rácok in the Kingdom of Hungary. In a later period rácok came to mean, above all, Serbs of Orthodox religion.

The Serbian military families enjoyed several privileges thanks to their service for the Habsburg Monarchy. Subotica gradually, however, developed from being a mere garrison town to becoming a market town with its own civil charter in 1743. When this happened, many Serbs complained about the loss of their privileges. The majority left the town in protest and some of them founded a new settlement just outside 18th century Subotica in Aleksandrovo, while others emigrated to Russia. In New Serbia, a new Russian province established for them, those Serbs founded a new settlement and also named it Subotica. In 1775, a Jewish community in Subotica was established.

It was perhaps to emphasise the new civic serenity of Subotica that the pious name "Saint Mary" came to be used for it at this time. Some decades later, in 1779, Empress Maria Theresa of Austria advanced the town's status further by proclaiming it a Free Royal Town. The enthusiastic inhabitants of the city renamed Subotica once more as Maria-Theresiopolis.

This Free Royal Town status gave a great impetus to the development of the city. During the 19th century, its population doubled twice, attracting many people from all over the Habsburg monarchy. This led eventually to a considerable demographic change. In the first half of the 19th century, the Bunjevci had still been in the majority, but there was an increasing number of Hungarians and Jews settling in Subotica. This process was not stopped even by the outbreak of the Revolutions in the Habsburg monarchy (1848–49).

=== Revolution of 1848–49 ===
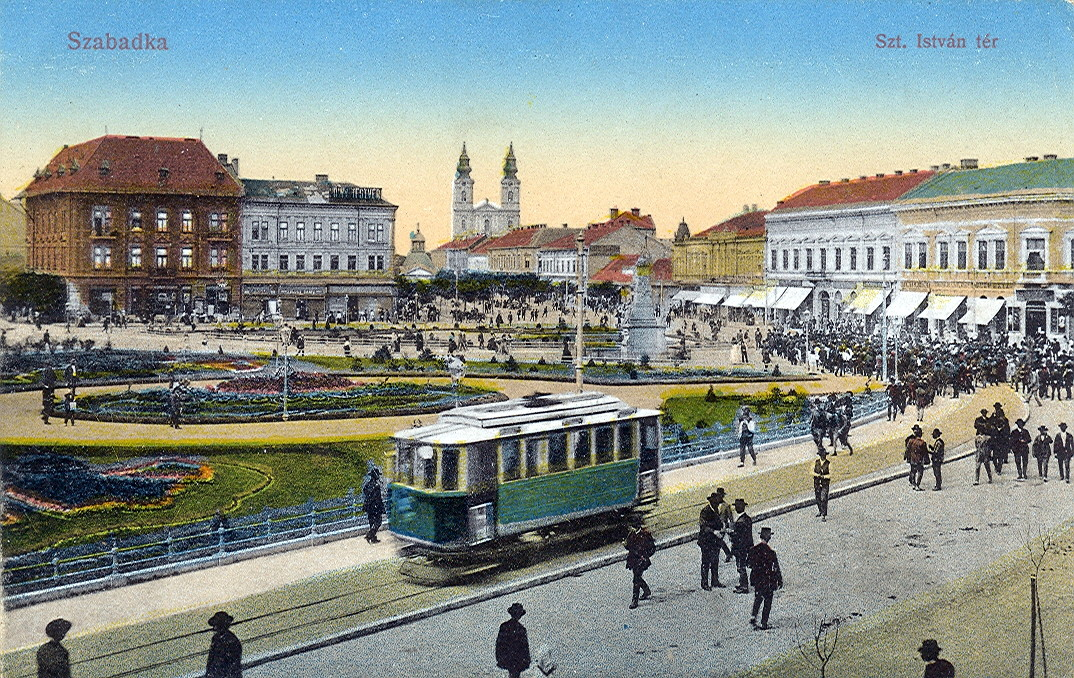
Subotica in 1914 Hungarian postcard

During the 1848–49 Revolution, the proclaimed borders of autonomous Serbian Vojvodina included Subotica, but Serb troops could not establish control in the region. On 5 March 1849, at the locality named Kaponja (between Tavankut and Bajmok), there was a battle between the Serb and Hungarian armies, which was won by the Hungarians.

The first newspaper in the town was also published during the 1848–49 revolution—it was called Honunk állapota ("State of Our Homeland") and was published in Hungarian by Károly Bitterman's local printing company. Unlike most Serbs and Croats who confronted the Hungarians, part of the local Bunjevci people supported the Hungarian revolution.

In 1849, after the Hungarian revolution of 1848 was defeated by the Russian and Habsburg armies, the town was separated from the Kingdom of Hungary together with most of the Bačka region, and became part of a separate Habsburg province, called Voivodeship of Serbia and Banat of Temeschwar. The administrative centre of this new province was Timișoara. The province existed until 1860. During the existence of the voivodeship, in 1853, Subotica acquired its impressive theatre.

=== Austria-Hungary ===
After the establishment of the Dual-Monarchy in 1867, there followed what is often called the "golden age" of city development of Subotica. Many schools were opened after 1867 and in 1869 the railway connected the city to the world. In 1896 an electrical power plant was built, further enhancing the development of the city and the whole region. Subotica now adorned itself with its remarkable Central European, fin de siècle architecture. In 1902 a Jewish synagogue was built in the Art Nouveau style.

Between 1849 and 1860 it was part of the Voivodeship of Serbia and Banat of Temeschwar.

=== Yugoslavia and Serbia ===
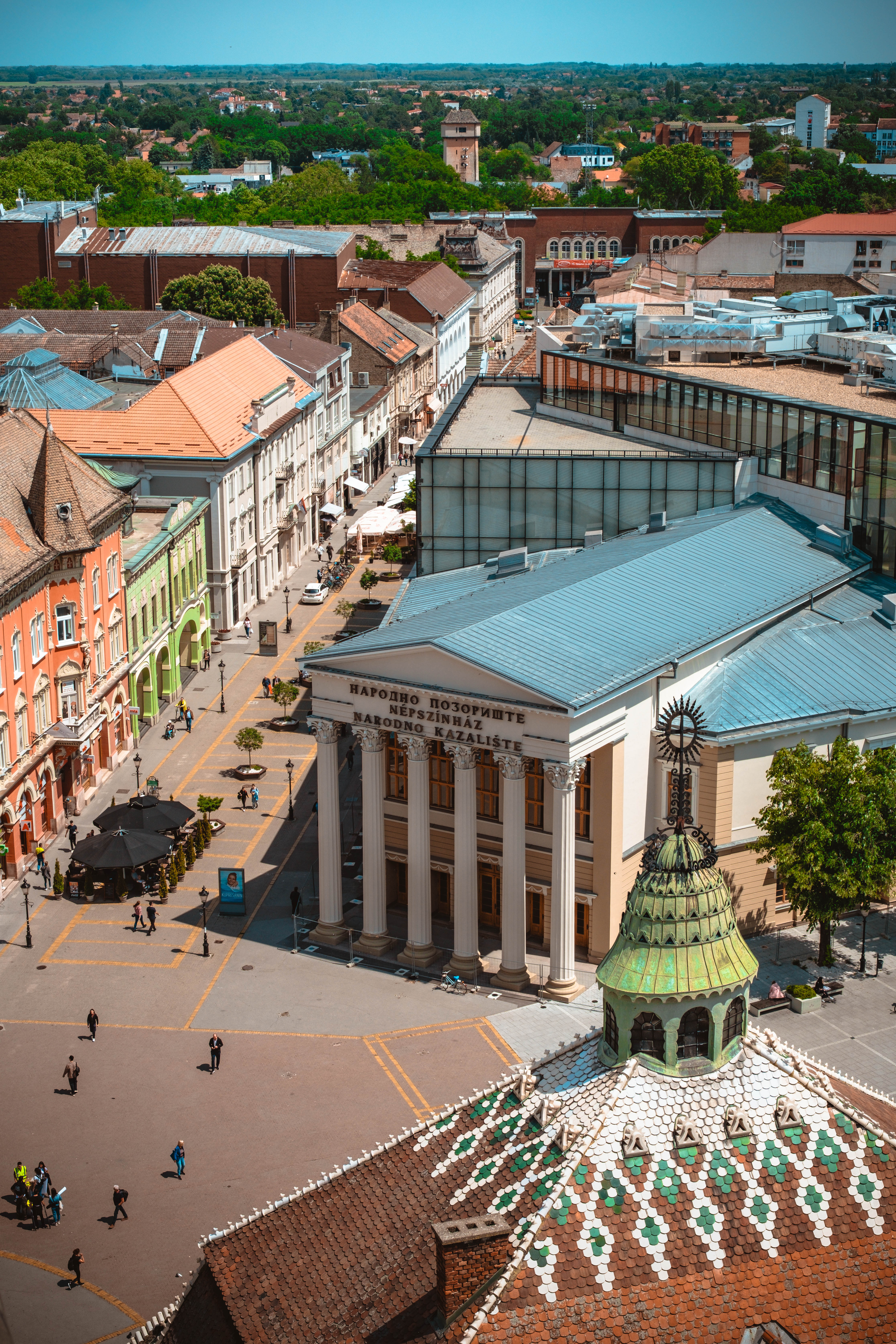
Subotica downtown aerial view, National Theatre in Subotica in the center.

Subotica had been part of Austria-Hungary until the end of World War I. In 1918, the city became part of the Kingdom of Serbs, Croats and Slovenes. As a result, Subotica became a border-town in Yugoslavia and did not, for a time, experience again the same dynamic prosperity it had enjoyed prior to World War I. However, during that time, Subotica was the third-largest city in Yugoslavia by population, following Belgrade and Zagreb.

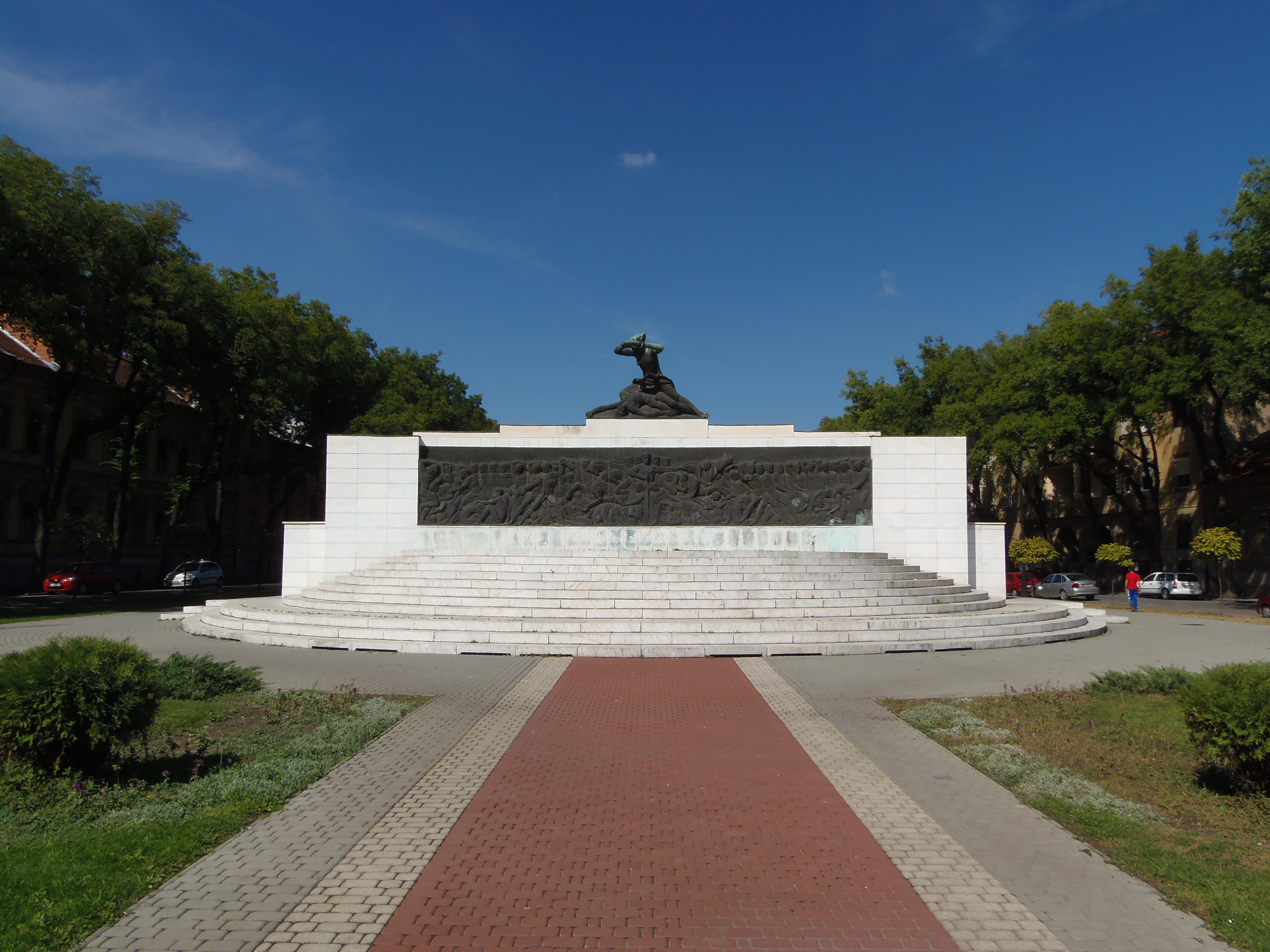
Monument to the Victims of Fascism

In 1941, Yugoslavia was invaded and partitioned by the Axis powers, and its northern parts, including Subotica, were annexed by Hungary. The annexation was not considered legitimate by the international community and the city was de jure still part of Yugoslavia. The Yugoslav government in exile received formal recognition of legitimacy as the representative of the country. On 11 April 1941, the Hungarian troops arrived in Subotica on the grounds that the majority of the people living in the city were ethnic Hungarians, which had been part of the Kingdom of Hungary for over 600 years. During World War II, the city lost approximately 7,000 of its citizens, mostly Serbs, Hungarians and Jews. Before the war about 6,000 Jews had lived in Subotica; many of these were deported from the city during the Holocaust, mostly to Auschwitz. In April 1944, under German administration, a ghetto was set up. In addition, many communists were executed during Axis rule. In 1944, the Axis forces left the city, and Subotica became part of the new Yugoslavia. During the 1944–45 period, about 8,000 citizens (mainly Hungarians) were killed by Partisans while re-taking the city as a retribution for supporting Axis Hungary.

In the postwar period, Subotica has gradually been modernised. During the Yugoslav and Kosovo wars of the 1990s, a considerable number of Serb refugees came to the city from Croatia, Bosnia and Herzegovina, and Kosovo, while many ethnic Hungarians and Croats, as well as some local Serbs, left the region.

== Geography ==
It is located in Central Europe at the Pannonian Basin at 46.07° North, 19.68° East, at the altitude of 109m, about 10 kilometres (6 miles) from the border with Hungary, and is the northernmost city in Serbia. Lake Palić is in the immediate vicinity of the city. Sand dunes area Subotička Peščara is located north of the city, along the Hungarian border.

=== Climate ===
Subotica has a humid subtropical climate (Cfa).

Climate data for Subotica (2009–2025)
Month	Jan	Feb	Mar	Apr	May	Jun	Jul	Aug	Sep	Oct	Nov	Dec	Year
Record high °C (°F)	16.5 (61.7)	20.2 (68.4)	26.8 (80.2)	31.9 (89.4)	32.5 (90.5)	39.5 (103.1)	40.0 (104.0)	40.4 (104.7)	36.4 (97.5)	28.0 (82.4)	23.4 (74.1)	18.1 (64.6)	40.4 (104.7)
Mean daily maximum °C (°F)	4.6 (40.3)	8.0 (46.4)	13.5 (56.3)	19.1 (66.4)	23.4 (74.1)	28.6 (83.5)	30.6 (87.1)	30.4 (86.7)	24.6 (76.3)	18.2 (64.8)	11.5 (52.7)	5.7 (42.3)	18.2 (64.7)
Daily mean °C (°F)	1.0 (33.8)	3.2 (37.8)	7.5 (45.5)	12.6 (54.7)	16.8 (62.2)	21.7 (71.1)	23.5 (74.3)	23.0 (73.4)	17.8 (64.0)	11.8 (53.2)	6.8 (44.2)	2.3 (36.1)	12.3 (54.2)
Mean daily minimum °C (°F)	−2.4 (27.7)	−1.3 (29.7)	1.5 (34.7)	5.6 (42.1)	10.3 (50.5)	14.6 (58.3)	16.1 (61.0)	15.5 (59.9)	11.5 (52.7)	6.2 (43.2)	2.6 (36.7)	−0.9 (30.4)	6.6 (43.9)
Record low °C (°F)	−20.2 (−4.4)	−21.7 (−7.1)	−9.7 (14.5)	−6.4 (20.5)	0.2 (32.4)	6.0 (42.8)	6.6 (43.9)	4.9 (40.8)	−1.1 (30.0)	−6.1 (21.0)	−8.3 (17.1)	−16.7 (1.9)	−21.7 (−7.1)
Average precipitation mm (inches)	38.5 (1.52)	43.2 (1.70)	34.6 (1.36)	29.5 (1.16)	82.6 (3.25)	60.0 (2.36)	57.7 (2.27)	43.3 (1.70)	62.7 (2.47)	50.3 (1.98)	45.1 (1.78)	45.9 (1.81)	593.4 (23.36)
Source: sumeteo.info

== Cityscape ==
Subotica boasts a collection of buildings built in the Hungarian Secession style, a distinct variant of Art Nouveau. The Hungarian Secession style combined art nouveau vegetal ornaments and symbolic figures with traditional Hungarian motifs. It found its architectural expression in Subotica in the works of Marcell Komor, Dezső Jakab and Ferenc Raichle. Iconic buildings like the Subotica Synagogue and the Reichel Palace, are recognized as some of the finest examples of this architectural style in Europe.

The City Hall (built in 1908–1910) and the Synagogue (1902) are of especially outstanding beauty. These were built by the same architects, Marcell Komor and Dezső Jakab. Another exceptional example of art nouveau architecture is the actual Raichle Palace, which was built in 1904 by Ferenc J. Raichle.

Church buildings include the Cathedral of St. Theresa of Avila dating from 1797, the Franciscan friary dating from 1723, the Eastern Orthodox churches also from the 18th century, and the Hungarian Art Nouveau Subotica Synagogue from the early 20th century, the second largest synagogue building in Europe.

The historic National Theatre in Subotica, which was built in 1854 as the first monumental public building in Subotica, was demolished in 2007, although it was declared a historic monument under state protection in 1983, and in 1991 it was added to the National Register as a monument of an extraordinary cultural value. It is currently in the midst of renovation and is scheduled to open in 2017.

Hungarian Secession buildings

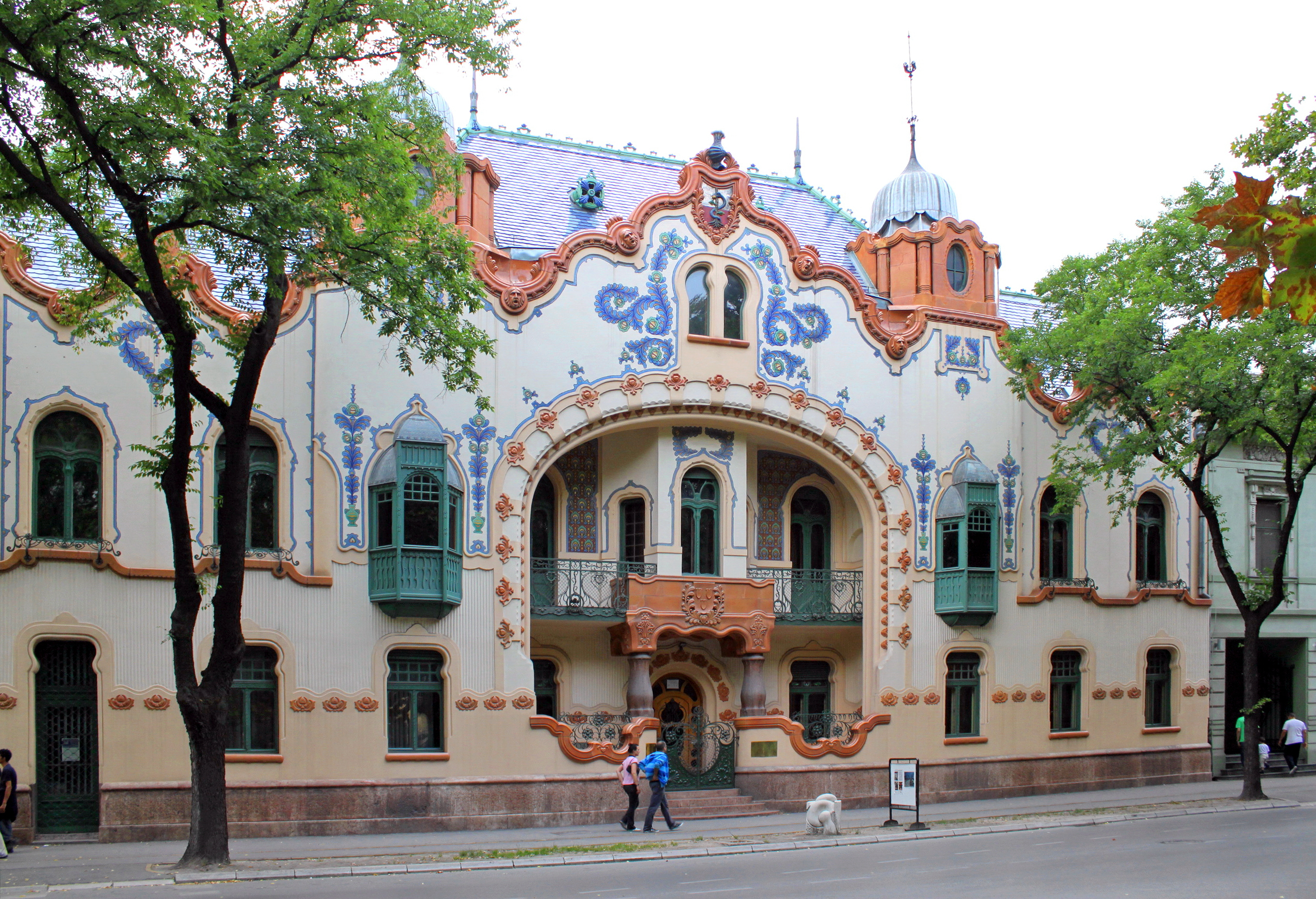
Raichle Palace

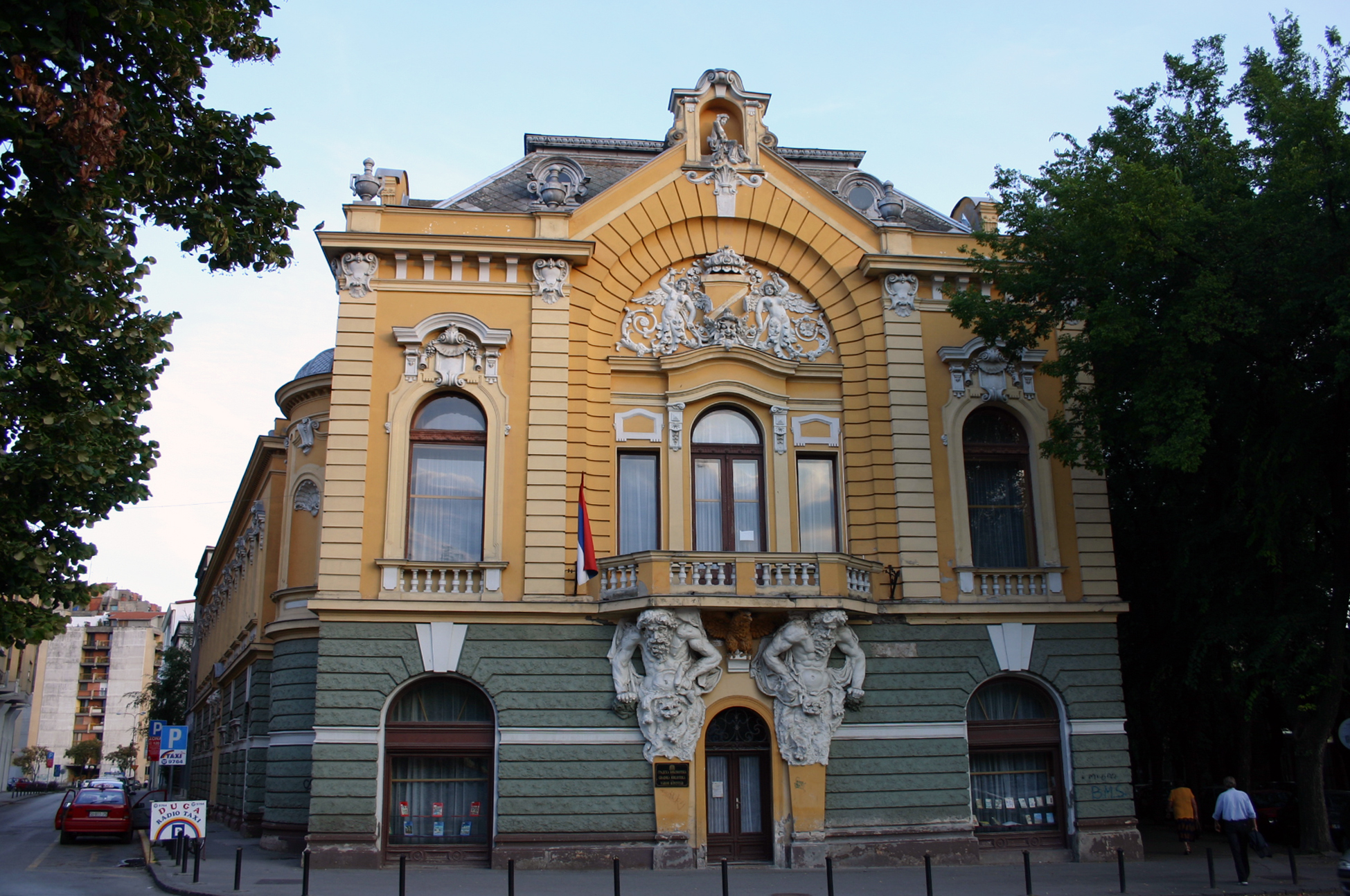
Municipal Library

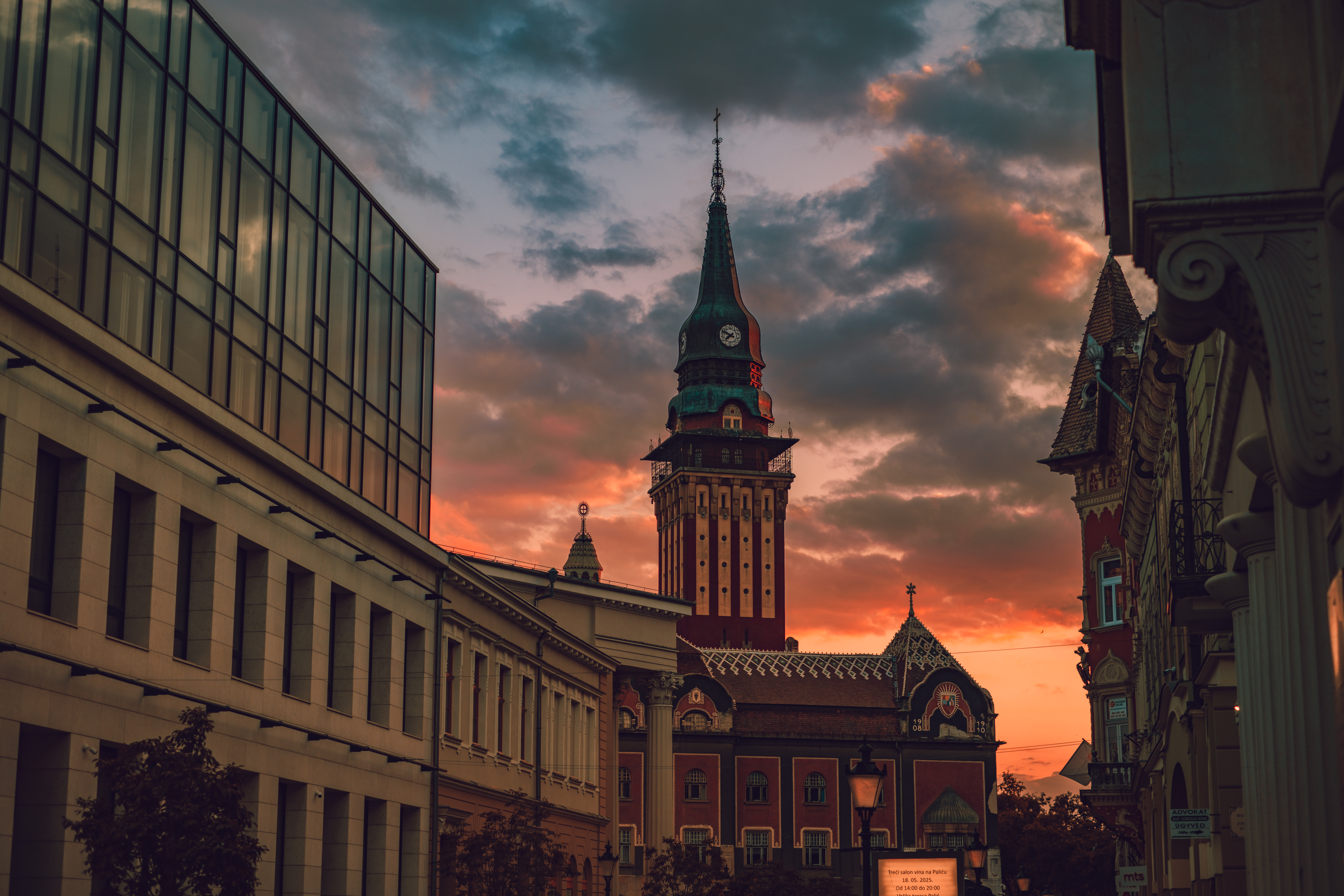
City Hall

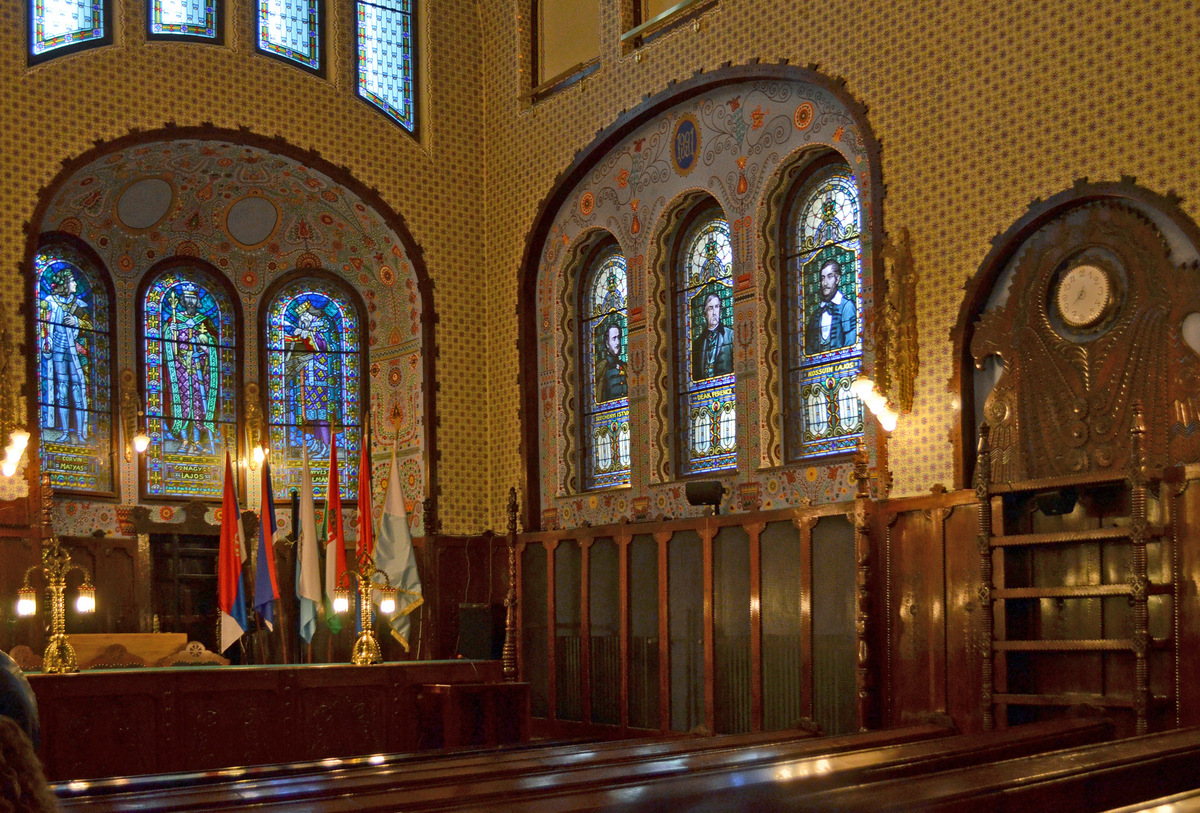
Interior of the City Hall

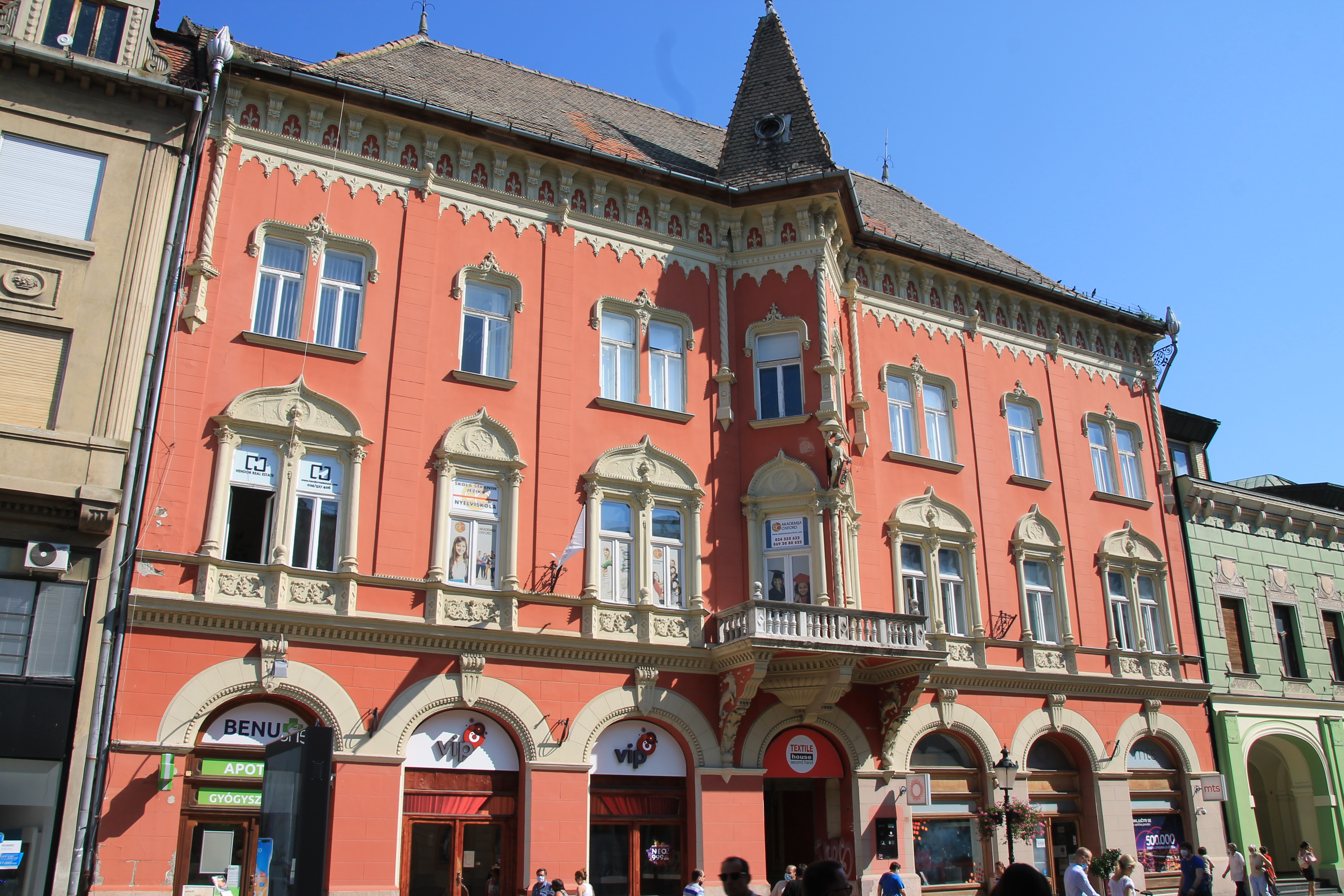
Vojnića palace

=== Neighborhoods ===
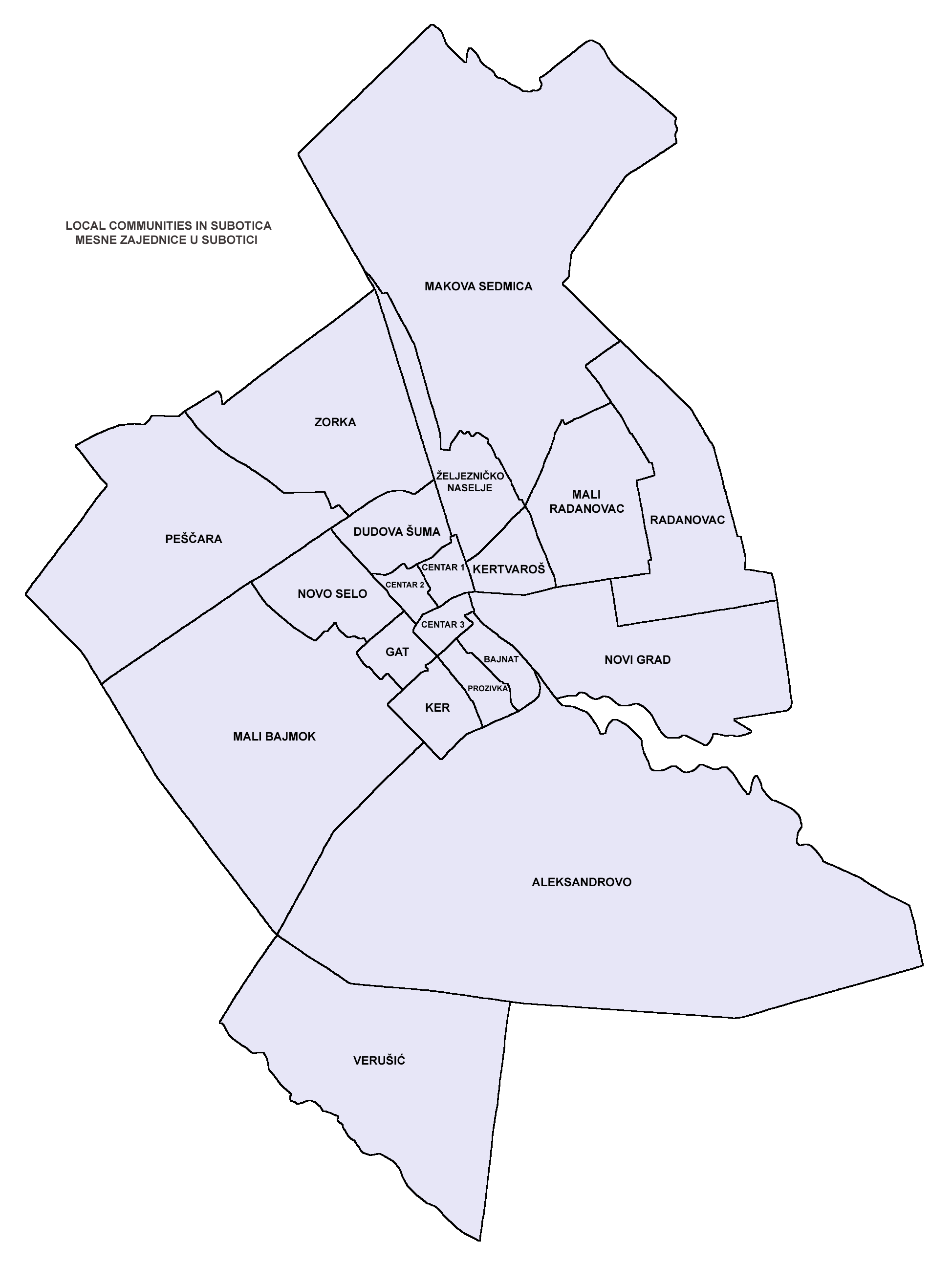
Local communities in Subotica.

The following are the neighborhoods of Subotica:

- Aleksandrovo (Hungarian: Sándor)
- Bajnat (Bajnát)
- Centar (Központ)
- Dudova Šuma (Radijalac) (Sétaerdő)
- Gat (Gát)
- Graničar (Határőr)
- Ker (Kér)
- Kertvaroš (Kertváros)
- Makova Sedmica (Makkhetes)
- Mali Bajmok (Kisbajmok)
- Mali Radanovac (Kisradanovác)
- Novi Grad (Újváros)
- Novo Naselje (Újtelep)
- Prozivka (Prozivka)
- Srpski Šor (Szerb sor)
- Teslino Naselje
- Veliki Radanovac (Nagyradanovác)
- Zorka (Zorka)
- Železničko Naselje (Vasutastelep)

=== Suburbs and villages ===
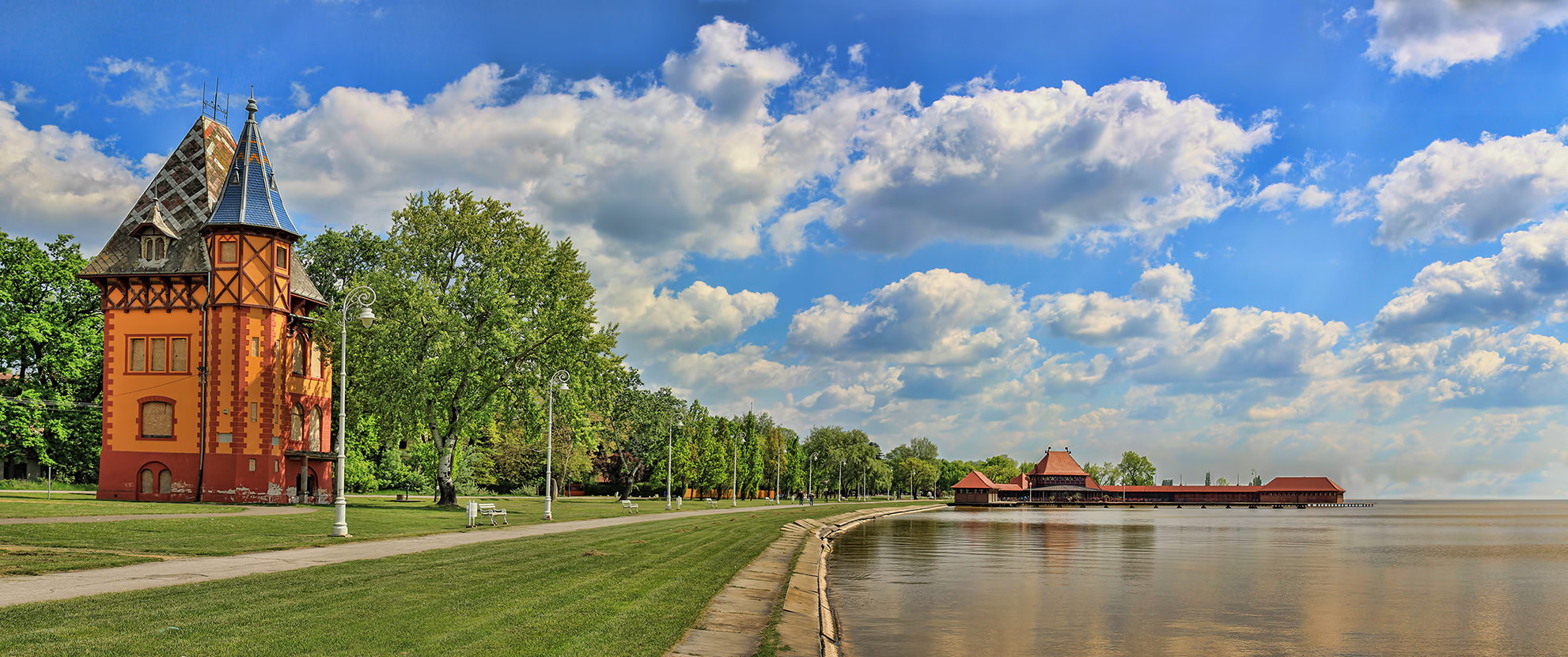
Lake Palić, popular recreational spot near Subotica.

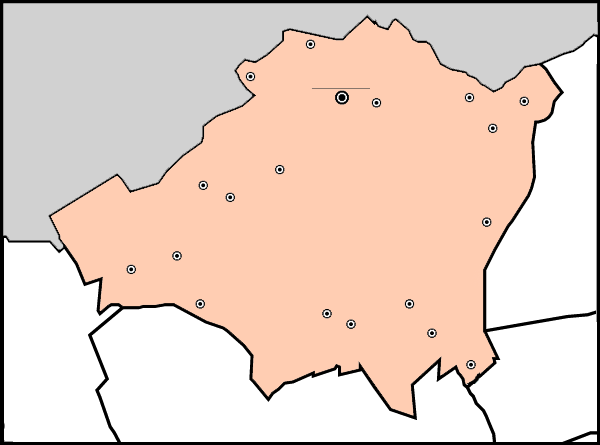

The administrative area of Subotica comprises Subotica proper, the town of Palić (Hungarian: Palics) and 17 villages. The villages are:

- Bački Vinogradi (Bácsszőlős)
- Bačko Dušanovo (Zentaörs)
- Bajmok (Bajmok)
- Bikovo (Békova)
- Čantavir (Csantavér)
- Donji Tavankut (Alsótavankút)
- Đurđin (Györgyén)
- Gornji Tavankut (Felsőtavankút)
- Hajdukovo (Hajdújárás)
- Kelebija (Alsókelebia)
- Ljutovo (Mérges)
- Mala Bosna (Kisbosznia)
- Mišićevo (Hadikörs)
- Novi Žednik (Újnagyfény)
- Stari Žednik (Nagyfény)
- Šupljak (Ludas)
- Višnjevac (Meggyes)

== Demographics ==
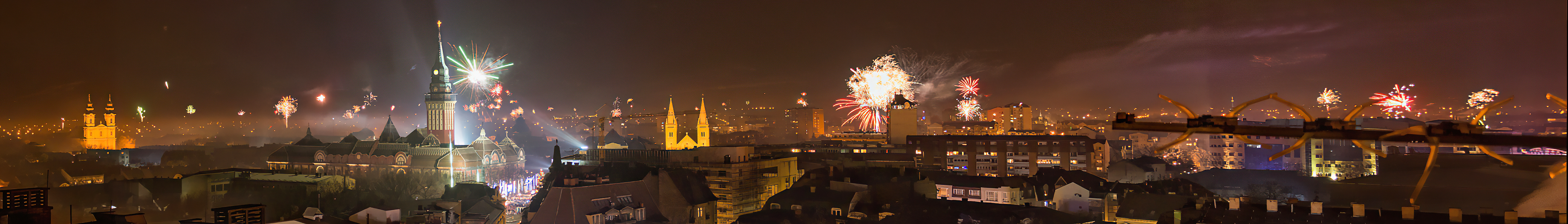
Panorama of Subotica on 2017 New Year's Eve

Historical population
Year	Pop.	±%
1948	62,715	—
1953	65,718	+4.8%
1961	74,604	+13.5%
1971	88,302	+18.4%
1981	99,840	+13.1%
1991	99,515	−0.3%
2002	99,283	−0.2%
2011	97,910	−1.4%
2022	88,752	−9.4%

According to the 2022 census results, the city proper had 88,752, while administrative area of Subotica had 123,952 inhabitants.

=== Ethnic structure ===
The ethnic structure of population of Subotica city proper (according to the 2022 census):

Ethnicity	Population	Share
Serbs	32,360	34.3%
Hungarians	24,687	26.2%
Croats	6,997	7.4%
Bunjevci	6,146	6.5%
Roma	2,888	3.%
Yugoslavs	1,850	1.9%
Others	3,684	3.9%
Undeclared	10,817	11.4%
Unknown	5,901	5.1%

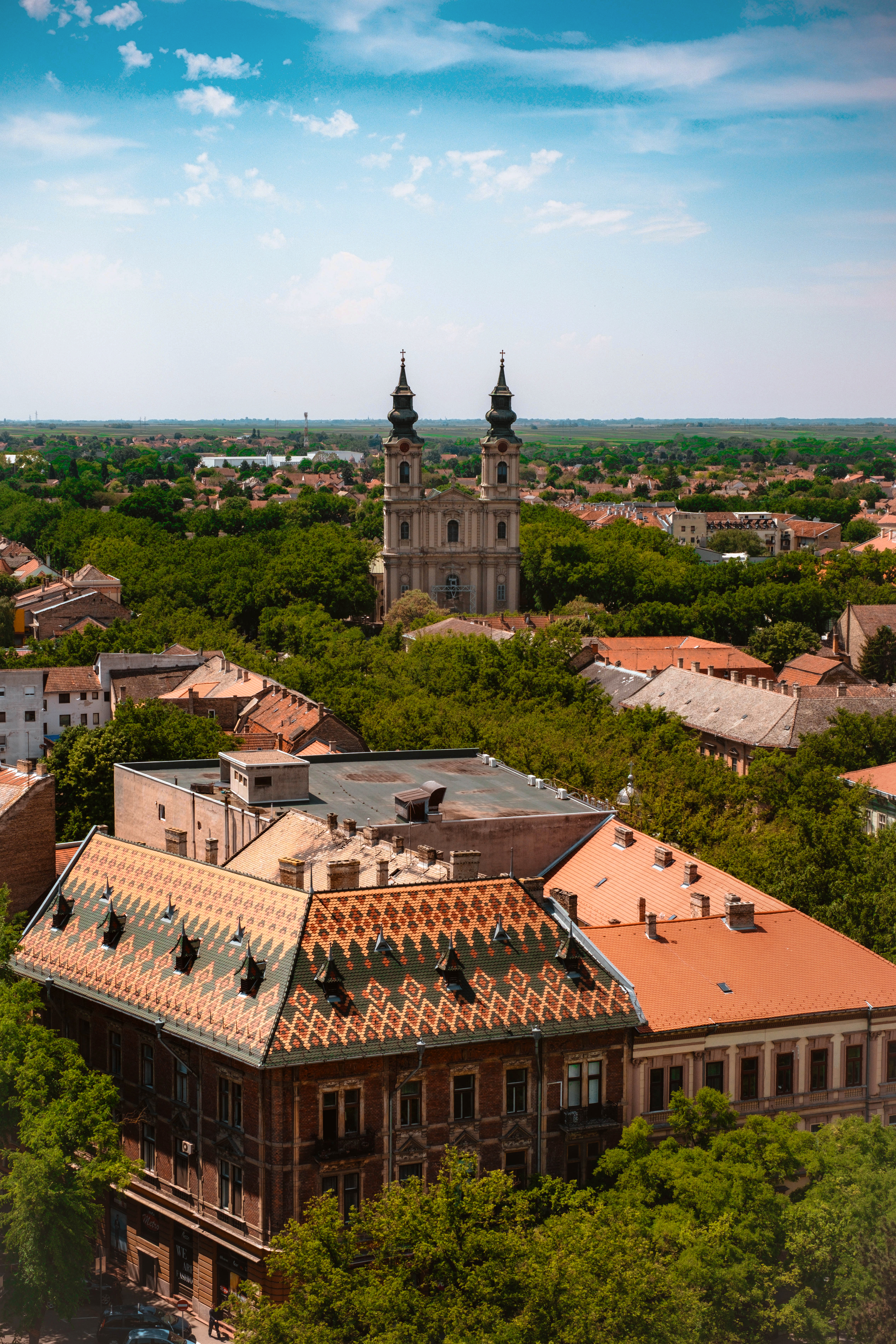
Roman Catholic Cathedral of Saint Teresa of Avila

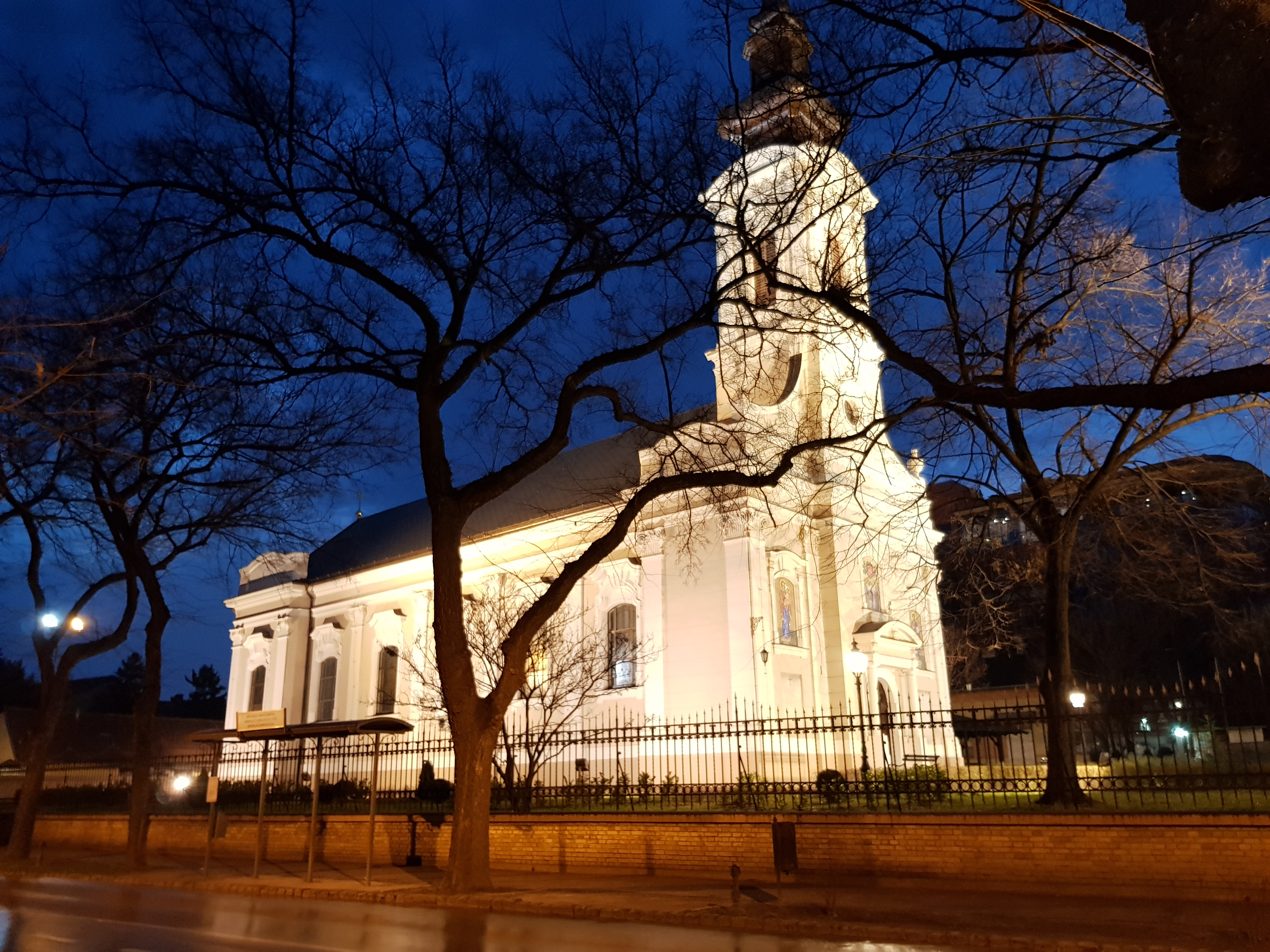
Eastern Orthodox Church of the Ascension

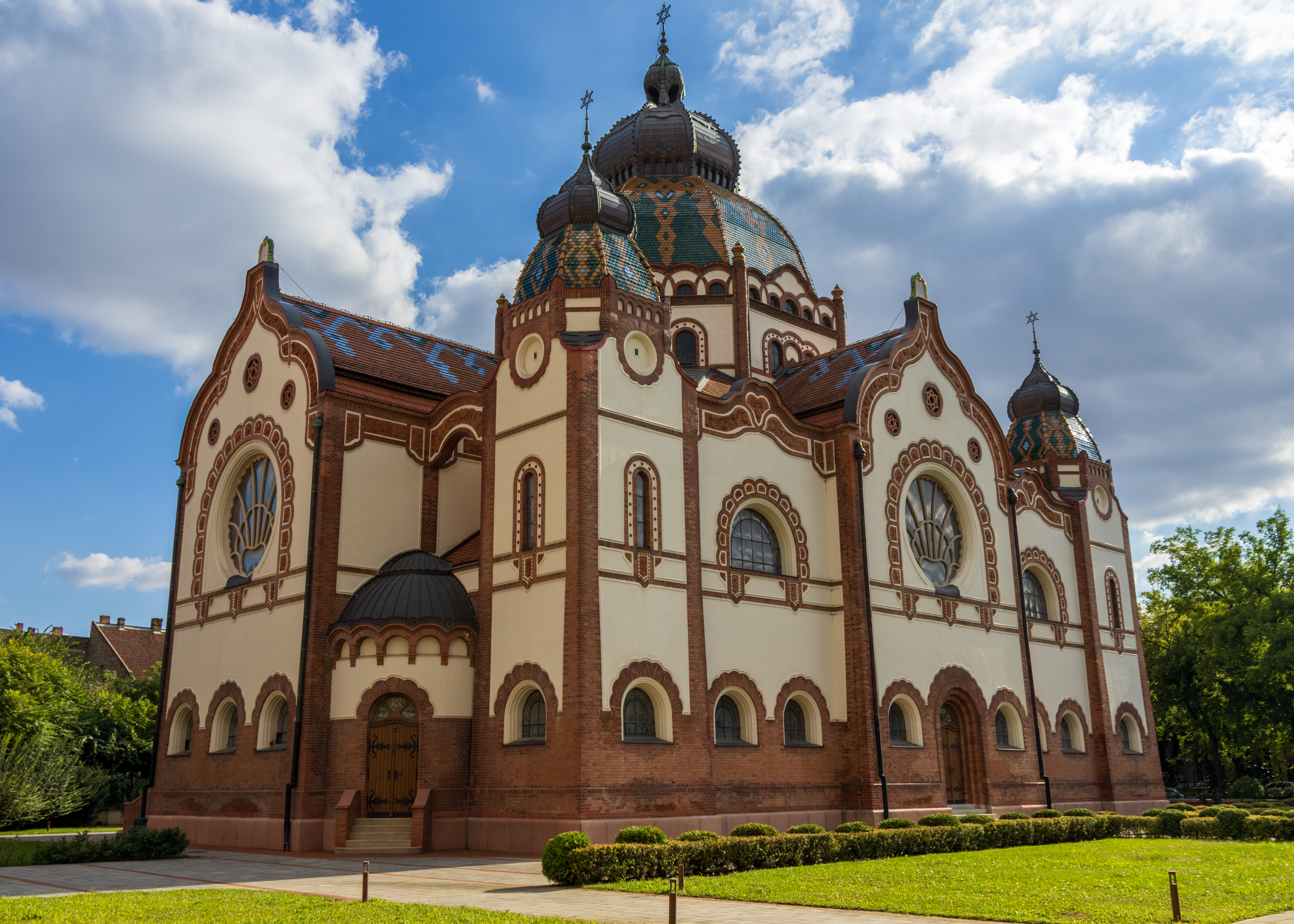
Subotica Synagogue

The ethnic structure of population of Subotica administrative area (according to the 2022 census):

Ethnicity	Population	Share
Serbs	38,174	30.8%
Hungarians	37,200	30%
Croats	10,431	8.4%
Bunjevci	9,060	7.3%
Roma	3,432	2.7%
Yugoslavs	2,187	1.7%
Others	4,187	3.3%
Undeclared	13,380	10.8%
Unknown	5,901	4.7%

Settlements with an absolute or relative Serb ethnic majority are Subotica city proper, Novi Žednik, Bajmok, Višnjevac, and Mišićevo. Settlements with either an absolute or relative Hungarian ethnic majority are: Palić (Hungarian: Palicsfürdő), Čantavir (Hungarian: Csantavér), Hajdukovo (Hungarian: Hajdújárás), Bački Vinogradi (Hungarian: Bácsszőlős), Šupljak (Hungarian: Alsóludas), Bačko Dušanovo (Hungarian: Zentaörs), and Kelebija (Hungarian: Alsókelebia). Villages with ethnic Croat relative majority are: Mala Bosna, Đurđin, Donji Tavankut, Bikovo, and Stari Žednik. Villages of Ljutovo and Gornji Tavankut have ethnic Bunjevac relative majority.

=== Linguistic structure ===
Linguistic structure of population of Subotica administrative area (according to the 2022 census):

Language	Speakers	Share
Serbian	59,575	48.2%
Hungarian	36,149	29.2%
Croatian	3,937	3.2%
Bunjevac	3,005	2.4%
Romani	2,959	2.4%
Others	6,305	5.10%
Undeclared	16,572	5.3%
Unknown	5,090	4.1%

Serbian is the most used language in everyday life, while Hungarian is used by almost 30% of the population in their daily conversations. Both languages are also widely used in commercial and official signage.

=== Religious structure ===
Religious structure of population of the Subotica administrative area (according to the 2022 census):

Religion	Adherents	Share
Catholicism	59,748	48.3%
Eastern Orthodoxy	37,674	30.5%
Islam	3,238	2.6%
Protestantism	1,609	1.3%
Judaism	54	0.04%
Atheist	2,141	1.7%
Agnostic	139	0.1%
Undeclared	12,473	10.1%
Unknown	5,090	4.9%

Subotica has the highest concentration of Catholics in Serbia with almost half of the city's population being Catholic. It is the seat of the Roman Catholic diocese with jurisdiction over the Bačka region. There are eight Catholic parish churches, a Franciscan spiritual centre (the city has communities of both Franciscan friars and Franciscan nuns), a female Dominican community, and two congregations of Augustinian religious sisters. The diocese of Subotica has the only Catholic secondary school in Serbia (Paulinum).

Among other Christian communities, the members of the Serbian Orthodox Church are the most numerous with almost third of city's population. There are two Orthodox church buildings in the city. Orthodox Christians in Subotica belong to the Eparchy of Bačka of the Serbian Orthodox Church. Subotica has two Protestant churches as well, Lutheran and Calvinist.

The Jewish community of Subotica is the third largest in Serbia, after those in Belgrade and Novi Sad. About 1,000 (of the 6,000 pre-WWII Jews of Subotica) survived the Holocaust. According to the 2022 census, only 54 practicing Jews remained in Subotica.

== Politics ==
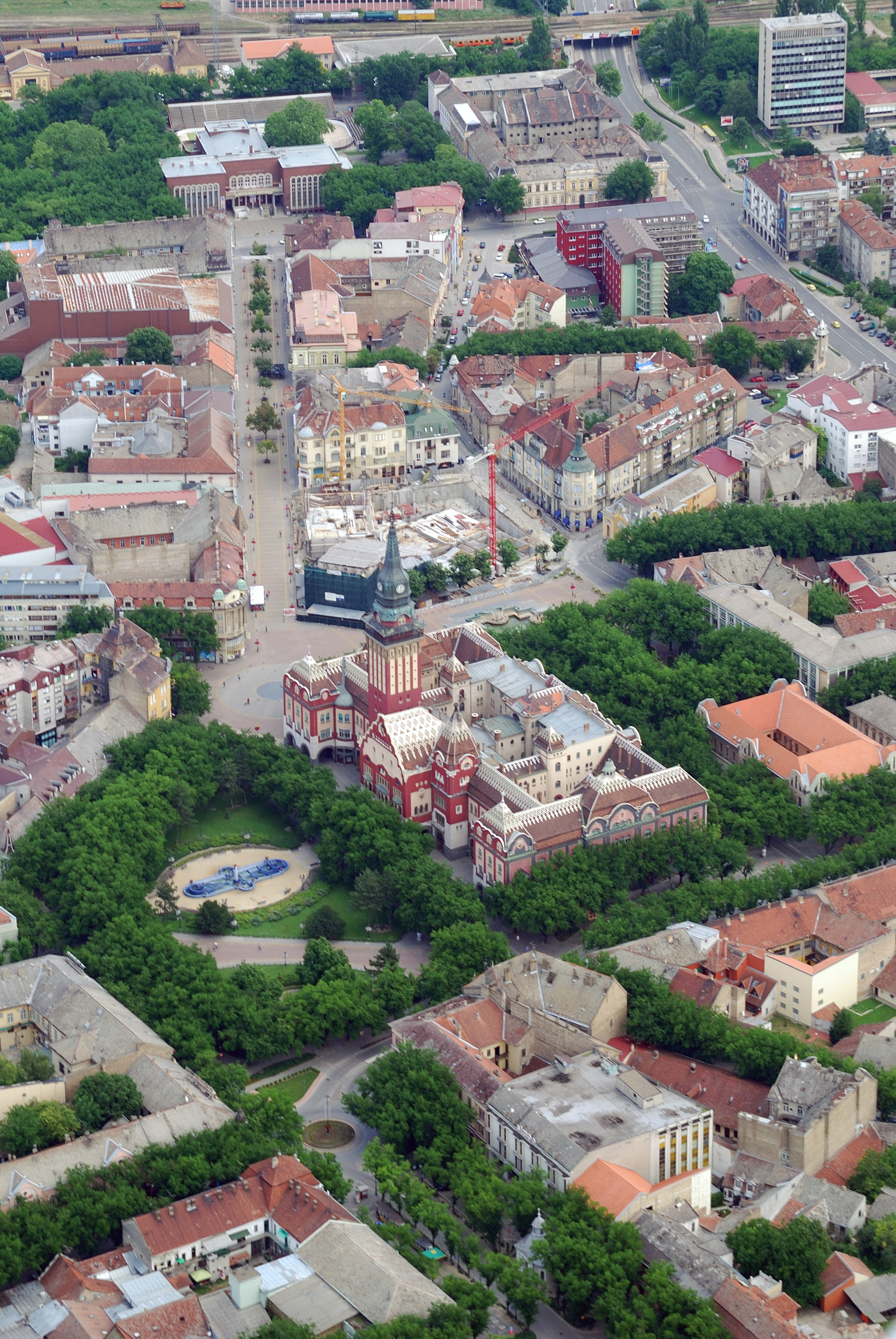
Subotica City Hall, aerial view

Results of 2024 local elections in Subotica:

- Serbia of Tomorrow: 49.3%
- Alliance of Vojvodina Hungarians: 26.2%
- Serbia Against Violence: 14.7%
- Democratic Alliance of Croats in Vojvodina: 4.1%

Coat of arms

The original coat of arms and current medium coat of arms have an outlining Latin inscription of Civitatis Maria Theresiopolis, Sigillum Liberæque Et Regiæ, translated as Seal of the Free and Royal City of Maria Theresiopolis.

== Economy ==
The area around Subotica is mainly farmland but the city itself is an important industrial and transportation centre in Serbia. Due to the surrounding farmlands Subotica has famous food producer industries in the country, including such brands as the confectionery factory "Pionir", "Fidelinka" the cereal manufacturer, "Mlekara Subotica" a milk producer and "Simex" producer of strong alcohol drinks.

Currently the biggest export industry in town is the "Siemens" wind generators factory and it is the biggest brownfield investment so far. The other big companies in Subotica are: Fornetti, ATB Sever and Masterplast. More recent companies to come to Subotica include Dunkermotoren and NORMA Group. Tourism is important. In the past few years, Palić has been famous for the Palić Film Festival. Subotica is a festival city, hosting more than 17 festivals over the year.

Subotica has one of 14 free economic zones established in Serbia.

In 2020 construction of a new aqua park with ten pools and wellness and spa sections was underway in Palić.

== Education ==
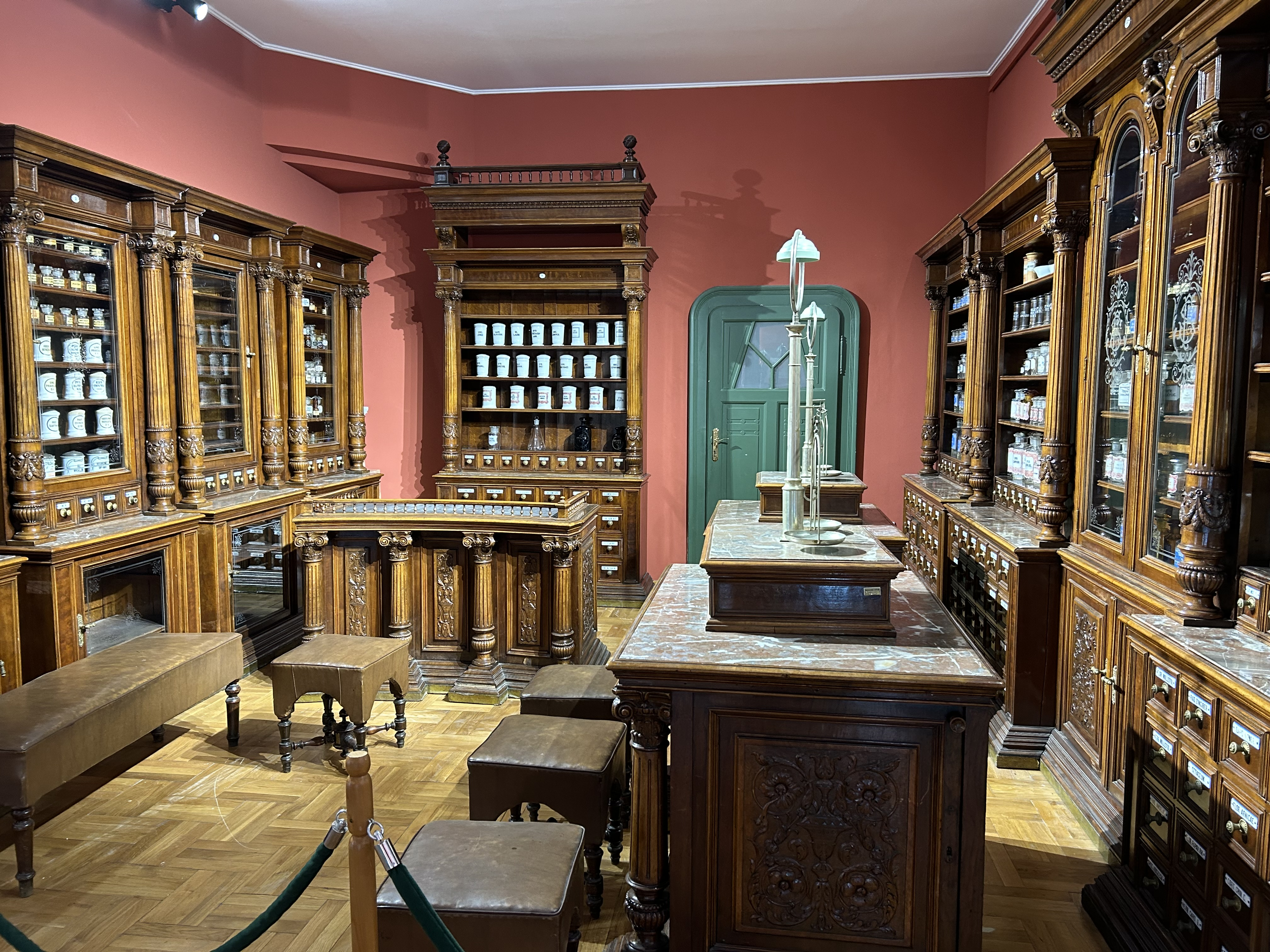
Municipal Museum of Subotica

=== Universities ===
- Teacher Training Faculty in the Hungarian Language of the University of Novi Sad

Tutoring of teachers in Subotica dates back to the late 18th century. After the establishment of Austria-Hungary, the second state-financed teacher training faculty of Hungary was founded in Subotica, second to Buda only. Modern history of teacher training in Subotica started in 2006, when the Sombor Teacher Training Faculty's curriculums in the Hungarian language seceded from the faculty and became independent as the 14th faculty of the University of Novi Sad. Nowadays, the faculty offers bachelor's degrees in kindergarten teaching, elementary school teaching, disciplinatory teaching and communications, and master's degrees in kindergarten teaching and elementary school teaching.

=== Secondary schools ===
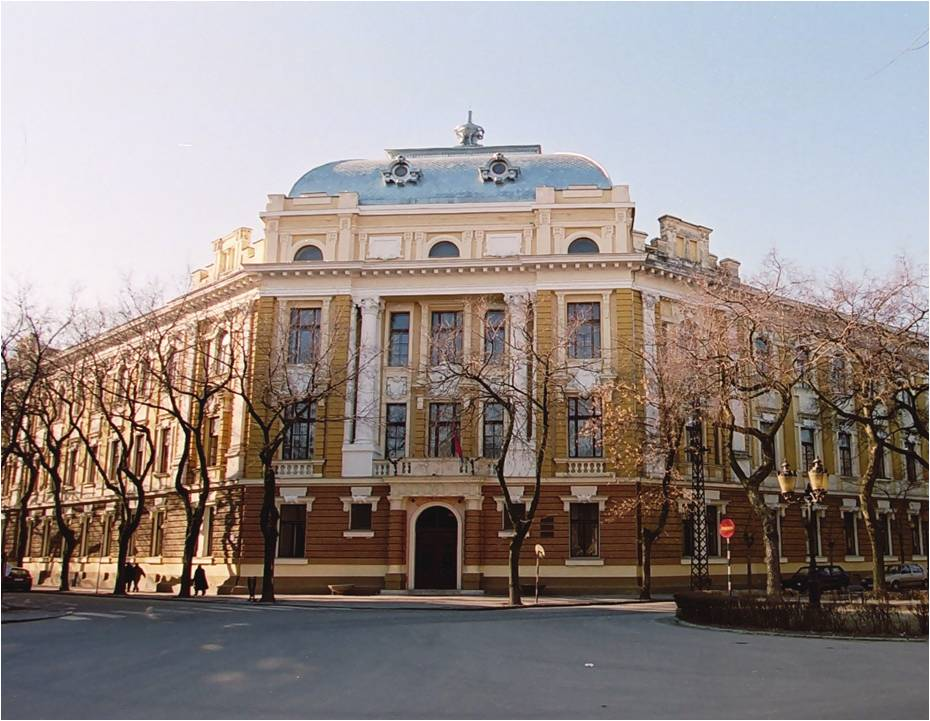
Svetozar Marković Gymnasium

- Polytechnic school, Surveying and Construction, Typography, Forestry and Wood Processing
- Teachers' College, founded in 1689, the oldest college in the country and region
- "Svetozar Marković" gymnasium
- "Dezső Kosztolányi" Philological grammar school
- "MEŠC" Electro-mechanical school, recently renamed to "Tehnička Škola - Subotica" (en. "Technical School")
- "Bosa Milićević" School of Economics
- "Lazar Nešić" School of Chemistry
- "Medicinska Škola" Medical School

4 953 students studied in the city in the year 2020/21 in the secondary education. 1 626 students chose Hungarian speaking classes (32.8%), 209 students chose Croatian classes while 3 118 students studied in Serbian language.

=== Historical schools (1920 to 1941) ===
- Subotica Law School

== Sport ==
Subotica has one major football stadium, the Subotica City Stadium, and an indoor arena, the Dudova Šuma Sports Hall. The most prominent local football team is FK Spartak and plays in the Serbian SuperLiga, the country's primary football competition. FK Bačka 1901 is the country's oldest football club and has played on the third level of the Serbian football pyramid. Also, the basketball team KK Spartak plays in the top-tier regional ABA League.

Szabadkai AFC is a defunct football club played in the Nemzeti Bajnokság III and won the Bácska group of the 1943–44 Nemzeti Bajnokság III season and gained promotion to the second division.

== Media ==
Newspapers and magazines published in Subotica:

- Magyar Szó, daily newspaper in Hungarian, founded 1944, published in Subotica since 2006
- Subotičke novine, main weekly newspaper in Serbian
- Hrvatska riječ, in Croatian
- Zvonik, in Croatian
- Bunjevačke novine, in Bunjevac

== Infrastructure ==
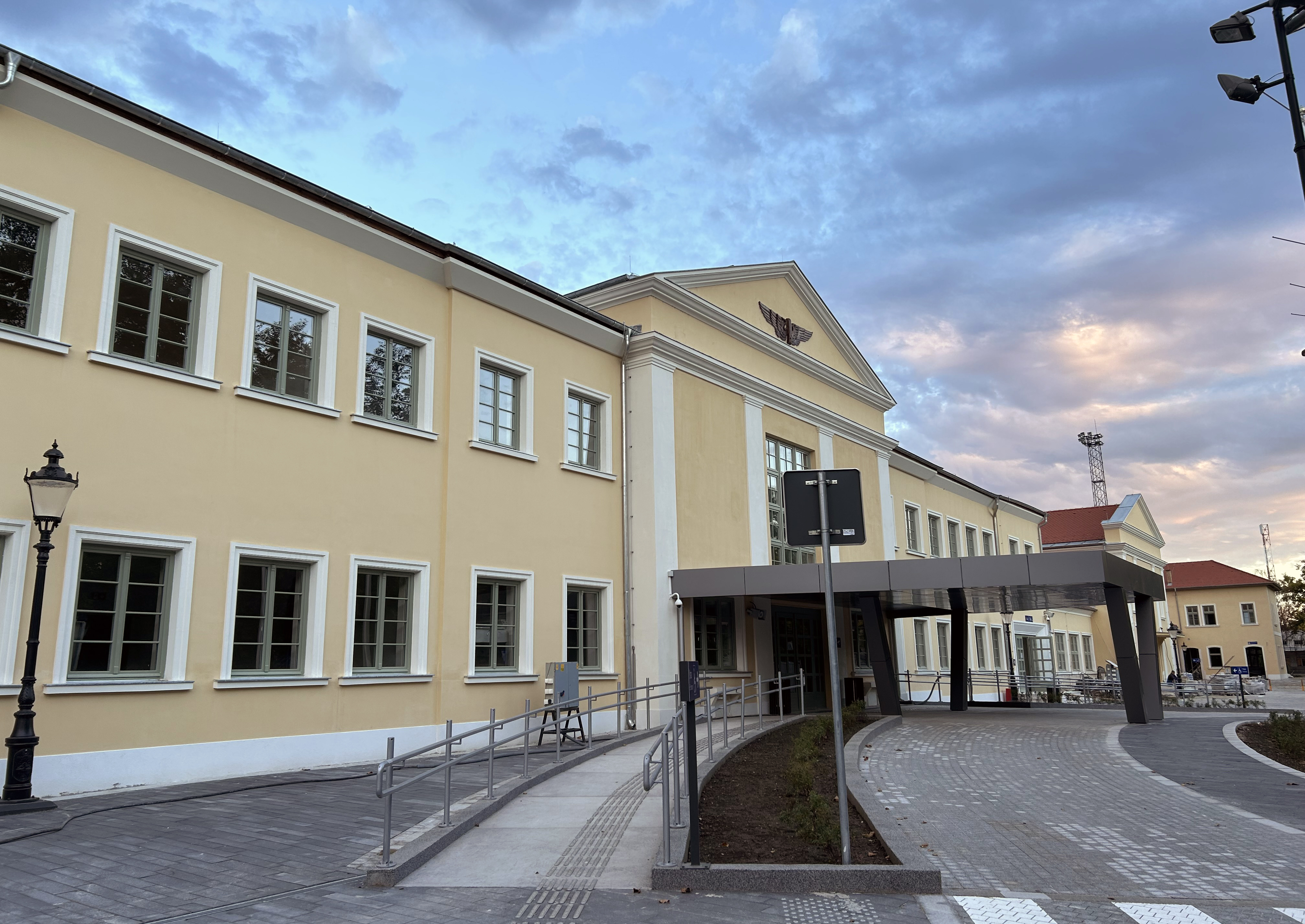
Subotica Central Railway Station.

A1 motorway connects the city with Novi Sad and Belgrade to the south and, across the border with Hungary, with Szeged to the north. It runs alongside the Budapest–Belgrade railway, which connects it to major European cities. As of November 2022, the line is out of order without replacement as both the Serbian and the Hungarian part of the line is currently being reconstructed. Subotica also has branch line railway connections to Sombor, Senta (with passenger service), and Szeged through Horgoš (under reconstruction with limited freight service, passenger service planned to commence in late 2023), while the former branch line to Baja through Csikéria was dismantled in the 1960s but parts of the derelict tracks are still visible in the city's northwestern outskirts.

A transit diagram of Subotica-bound trains

The city used to have a tram system, the Subotica tram system, but it was discontinued in 1974. The Subotica tram, put into operation in 1897, ran on electricity from the start. While neighbouring cities' trams at this date were often still horse-drawn, this gave the Subotica system an advantage over other municipalities including Belgrade, Novi Sad, Zagreb, and Szeged. Its existence was important for the citizens of Subotica, as well as tourists who came to visit. Subotica has since developed a bus system, operated by JP Subotica Trans, who operates eleven city lines, eight suburban lines, and thirteen interurban lines, as well as a single international line to Szeged. Per year the buses travel some 4.7 million kilometres, and carry about ten million people.

The city is served by Subotica Airport; its runway is too short for airliners, limiting usage to mostly recreational aviation. Southwest of the city there is a 218.5 metres tall guyed mast for FM-/TV-broadcasting. It is the tallest of its kind in Serbia and one of the tallest in the region.

== Notable citizens ==
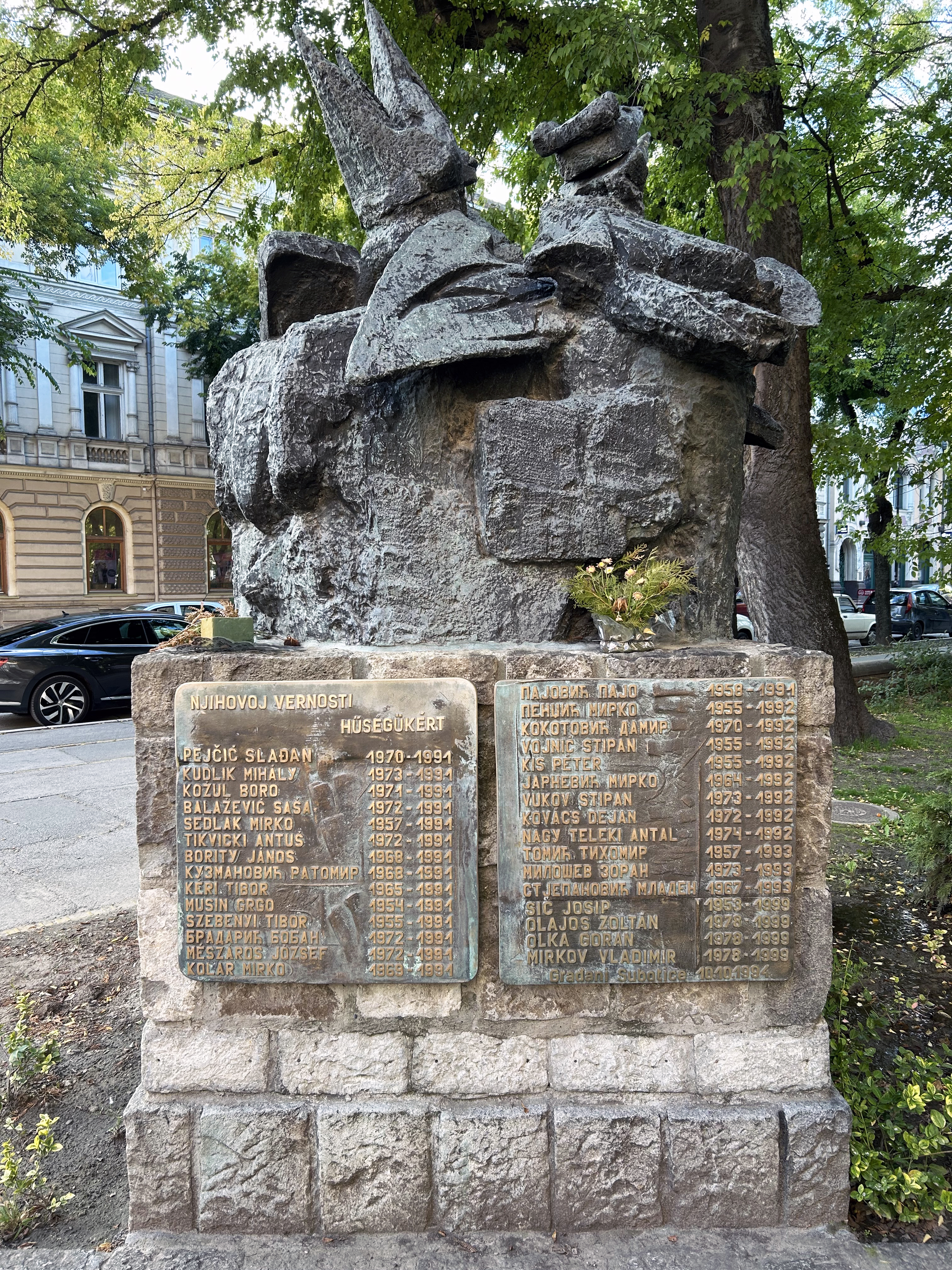
Monument to the fighters who died in the wars of the 1990s

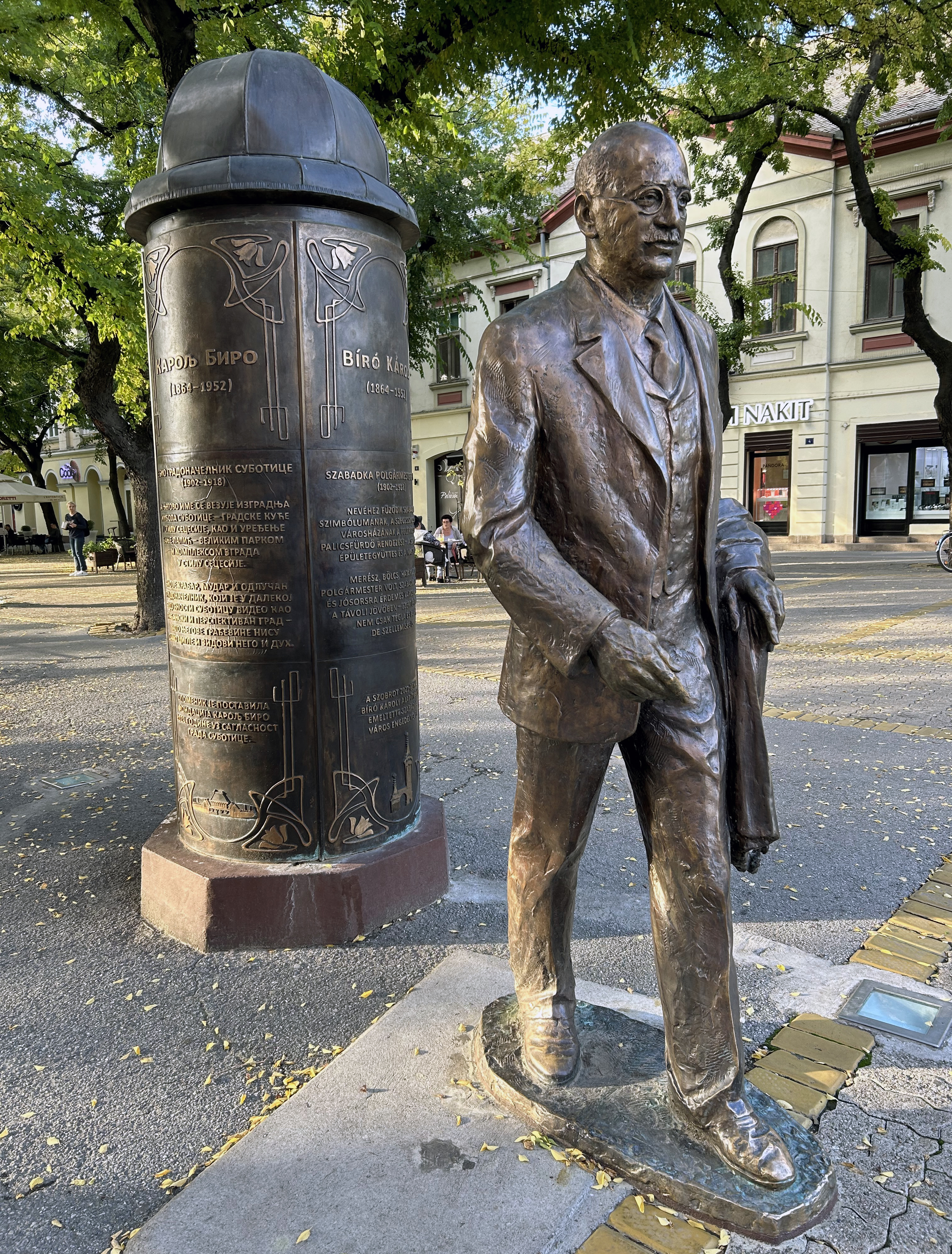
Politician Károly Bíró

- Branimir Aleksić (born 1990), football player and member of the Serbia national football team
- Sava Babić (1934–2012), writer, translator, and university professor
- Géza Csáth (1887–1919), Hungarian writer, musician, music critic, psychiatrist, and physician
- Gyula Cseszneky (born 1914), Hungarian, poet, voivode
- Ilona Csepreghyné-Meznerics (1906–1977), Hungarian stratigrapher and invertebrate paleontologist
- Sreten Damjanović (born 1946), wrestler
- Marko Dmitrović (born 1992), goalkeeper for the Serbia national football team and Spanish football club Eibar
- Oliver Dulić (born 1975), politician
- Vlatko Dulić (1943–2015), actor
- Yehuda Elkana (born 1934), Israeli philosopher of science
- Vladimir Grahovac (born 1975), Serbian politician
- Nikola Kalinić (born 1991), Serbian basketball player, silver medalist at the Olympics and the FIBA World Cup
- Zoran Kalinić (born 1958), table tennis champion
- Danilo Kiš (1935–1989), writer
- Juci Komlós (1919–2011), Hungarian actress
- Radomir Konstantinović (1928−2011), Serbian writer and philosopher
- Dezső Kosztolányi (1885–1936), Hungarian poet and prose-writer
- Zoran Kuntić (born 1967), Serbian retired professional footballer
- Félix Lajkó (born 1974), world music violinist and composer
- Péter Lékó (born 1979), Hungary's number one chess player
- Szilveszter Lévai (born 1945), Hungarian composer
- Aleksandar Lifka (1880–1952), central-European cinematographer
- Bela Lugosi (1882–1956), actor
- Boris Malagurski (born 1988), Serbian Canadian film director, producer, and TV host
- Sanja Malagurski (born 1990), volleyball player
- Refik Memišević (1956–2004), wrestling champion
- Đula Mešter (born 1972), volleyball player and Olympic champion
- Jovan Mikić (1914–1944), leader of the Partisans in Subotica, and a national hero who was killed in 1944
- Ajs Nigrutin (born 1977), Serbian rapper.
- Tihomir Ognjanov (1927–2006), Serbian footballer for the Yugoslavia national football team
- Momir Petković (born 1953), wrestling champion
- Bojana Radulović (born 1973), handball player
- Mirna Radulović (born 1992), Serbian singer who represented Serbia in the Eurovision Song Contest 2013 as part of Moje 3
- Eva Ras (born 1941), actress, painter, and writer
- Magdolna Rúzsa (born 1985), Hungarian pop singer
- Ivan Sarić (1876–1966), aviation pioneer and cyclist
- Tibor Sekelj (Tibor Székely) (1912–1988), explorer, esperantist, writer
- John Simon (1925–2019), American theatre critic
- Davor Štefanek (born 1985), Serbian wrestler and Olympic champion
- György Sztantics (1878–1918), racewalking champion at the Intercalated Games
- Itzchak Tarkay (1935–2012), Israeli artist
- Đorđe Tutorić (born 1983), Serbian professional football player

== International cooperation ==
- Subotica is a pilot city of the Council of Europe and the EU Intercultural cities programme.

=== Twin towns – sister cities ===
Subotica is twinned with:

- Brest, Belarus
- Dunajská Streda, Slovakia
- Kiskunhalas, Hungary
- Łomża, Poland
- Odorheiu Secuiesc, Romania
- Olomouc, Czech Republic
- Osijek, Croatia
- Szeged, Hungary

== See also ==
- Municipalities of Serbia
- List of cities in Serbia
- List of cities, towns and villages in Vojvodina

== Books ==
- Bârcă, Vitalie (2013). Nomads of the Steppes on the Danube Frontier of the Roman Empire in the 1st Century CE. Historical Sketch and Chronological Remarks. Dacia. OCLC 1023761641.
- Barford, Paul M (2001). The Early Slavs: Culture and Society in Early Medieval Eastern Europe. Cornell University Press. ISBN 978-0-8014-3977-3.
- Varga, Szabolcs (2013). "Croatia and Slavonia in the Early Modern Age" (PDF). Hungarian Studies. 27 (2): 263–276. doi:10.1556/HStud.27.2013.2.5.

== Sources ==
- Recent (2002) statistical information comes from the Serbian statistical office.
  - Ethnic statistics: "КОНАЧНИ РЕЗУЛТАТИ ПОПИСА 2002" (PDF). Archived from the original (PDF) on 2009-02-25. (477 KB), САОПШTЕЊЕ СН31, брoј 295 • год. LII, 24.12.2002, YU ISSN 0353-9555. Accessed 17 January 2006. On page 6–7, Становништво према националној или етничкој припадности по попису 2002. Statistics can be found on the lines for "Суботица" (Subotica).
  - Language and religion statistics: Popis stanovništva, domaćinstava i stanova u 2002, ISBN 86-84433-02-5. Accessed 17 January 2006. On page 11–12: СТАНОВНИШТВО ПРЕМА ВЕРОИСПОВЕСТИ, СТАНОВНИШТВО ПРЕМА МАТЕРЊЕМ ЈЕЗИКУ. Statistics can be found on the lines for "Суботица" (Subotica).
  - Ferdinand, S. and F. Komlosi. 2017. The Use of Hungarian and Serbian in the City of Szabadka/Subotica: An Empirical Study, Hungarian Cultural Studies, Volume 10. Accessed 8 September 2017.
