= Hajdukovo =

Hajdukovo Хајдуково (Serbian) Hajdújárás (Hungarian)
- Village (Selo)
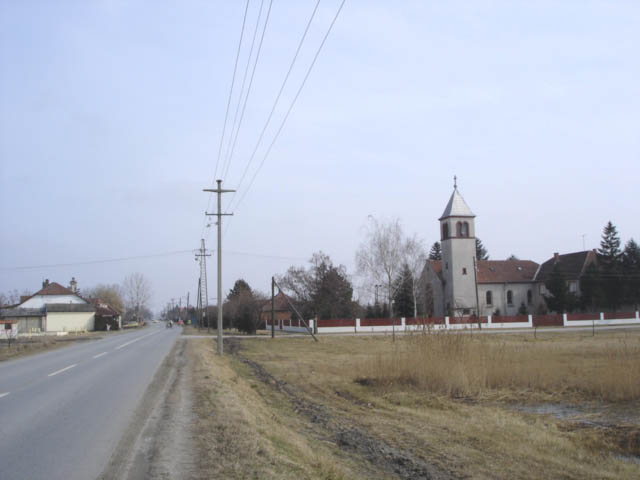
- Main street and the Catholic Church

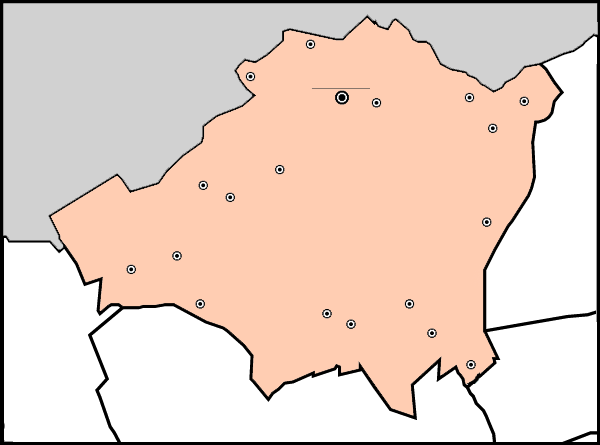

- Location within Vojvodina Location within Serbia Location within Europe
- Country: Serbia
- Province: Vojvodina
- District: North Bačka District
- Municipality: Subotica

Population (2022)
  - Total: 1,854
- Time zone: UTC+1 (CET)
  - Summer (DST): UTC+2 (CEST)

Hajdukovo (Serbian Cyrillic: Хајдуково, Hungarian: Hajdújárás, Croatian: Hajdukovo) is a village located in the administrative area of the City of Subotica, in the North Bačka District, Vojvodina, Serbia. The village has a population of 1,854 people (2022 census).

== Demographics ==
=== Historical population ===
- 1961: 1,791
- 1971: 2,118
- 1981: 2,829
- 1991: 2,627
- 2002: 2,482
- 2011: 2,313
- 2022: 1,854

=== Ethnic groups ===
According to data from the 2022 census, ethnic groups in the village include:

- 1,599 (86.2%) Hungarians
- 89 (4.8%) Serbs
- Others/Undeclared/Unknown

== See also ==
- List of places in Serbia
- List of cities, towns and villages in Vojvodina
