= Mišićevo =

Mišićevo Мишићево (Serbian)
- Village (Selo)
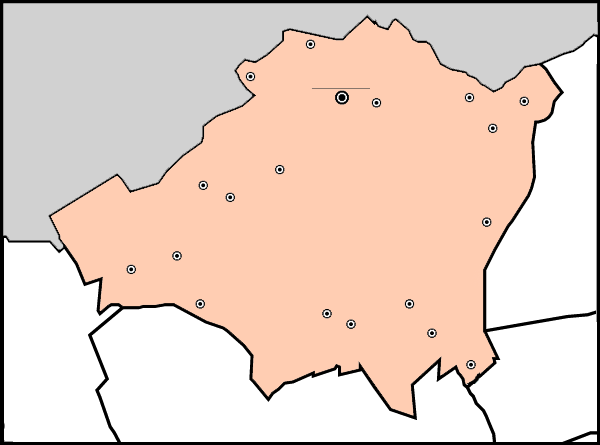

- Location within Vojvodina Location within Serbia Location within Europe
- Coordinates: 45°59′N 19°29′E
- Country: Serbia
- Province: Vojvodina

Population (2022)
  - Total: 266
- Time zone: UTC+1 (CET)
  - Summer (DST): UTC+2 (CEST)

Mišićevo (Serbian: Мишићево) is a village located in the administrative area of the City of Subotica, in the North Bačka District, Vojvodina, Serbia. The village has a population of 266 people (2022 census).

== Name ==
In Serbian Cyrillic the village is known as Мишићево, in Serbian Latin as Mišićevo, in Bunjevac as Mišićevo, in Croatian as Mišićevo, and in Hungarian as Hadikörs.

== Demographics ==
=== Historical population ===
- 1981: 517
- 1991: 509
- 2002: 446
- 2011: 377
- 2022: 266

=== Ethnic groups ===
According to data from the 2022 census, ethnic groups in the village include:

- 129 (48.5%) Serbs
- 53 (19.9%) Bunjevci
- 25 (9.4%) Croats
- 10 (3.7%) Hungarians

== See also ==
- List of places in Serbia
- List of cities, towns and villages in Vojvodina
