= Višnjevac, Subotica =

Višnjevac Вишњевац (Serbian)
- Village (Selo)
- Location within Vojvodina Location within Serbia Location within Europe
- Country: Serbia
- Province: Vojvodina
- District: North Bačka District
- Municipality: Subotica

Population (2022)
  - Total: 457
- Time zone: UTC+1 (CET)
  - Summer (DST): UTC+2 (CEST)

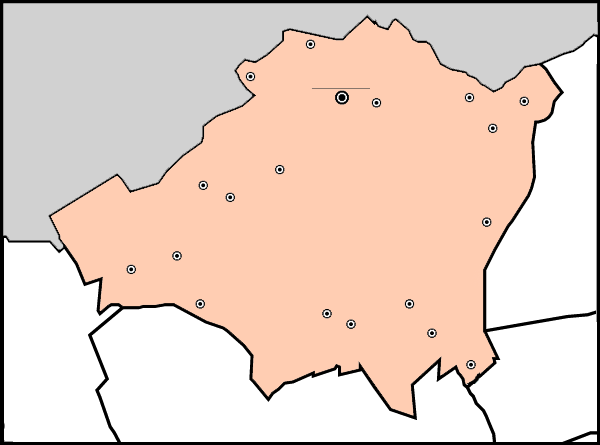

Višnjevac (Serbian Cyrillic: Вишњевац) is a village located in the administrative area of the City of Subotica, North Bačka District, Vojvodina, Serbia. The village has a population of 457 people (2022 census).

== Name ==
In Serbian the settlement is known as Višnjevac (Вишњевац), in Hungarian as Meggyes, in Bunjevac as Višnjevac, and in Croatian as Višnjevac. It was also known as Radivojevićevo (Радивојевићево).

== Demographics ==
=== Historical population ===
- 1961: 694
- 1971: 668
- 1981: 703
- 1991: 634
- 2002: 639
- 2011: 527
- 2022: 457

=== Ethnic groups ===
According to data from the 2022 census, ethnic groups in the village include:

- 191 (41.8%) Serbs
- 156 (34.1%) Hungarians
- Others/Undeclared/Unknown

== See also ==
- List of places in Serbia
- List of cities, towns and villages in Vojvodina
