= Körös-ér =

Körös-ér Киреш
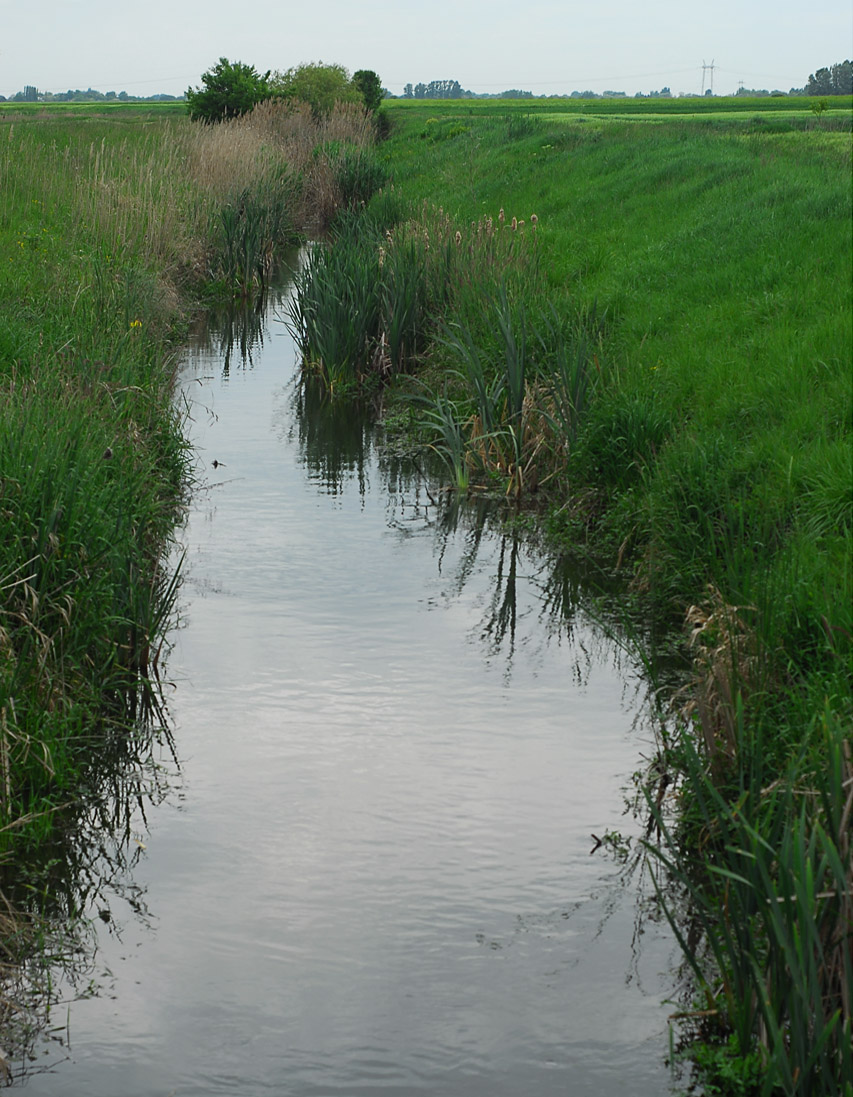
- The river near Male Pijace
- Native name: Körös-ér (Hungarian); Киреш (Serbian); Kireš (Serbian)

Location
- Countries: Hungary and Serbia

Physical characteristics
- Source
  - location: west of Jánoshalma, south Hungary
  - elevation: 138 m (453 ft)
- Mouth
  - location: Tisa river at Adorjan, Vojvodina, Serbia
  - coordinates: 46°0′44″N 20°1′58″E
  - elevation: 76 m (249 ft)
- Length: 90 km (56 mi)
- Basin size: 976 km^{2} (377 sq mi)

Basin features
- Progression: Tisza→ Danube→ Black Sea

The Körös-ér (Hungarian, also Kőrös-patak), Kireš or Kereš (Serbian: Киреш, Кереш), is a river in southern Hungary and northern Serbia, a 90-kilometre-long (56 mi) right tributary to the Tisa river. It flows entirely within the Bačka border region: 37 km (23 mi) in Hungary, 15 km (9.3 mi) as a border river and 29 km (18 mi) in Serbia (roughly, as different authors give different data).

== Hungary ==
The Körös-ér springs in the Hungarian part of the Subotička Peščara, between the towns of Jánoshalma and Kiskunhalas. It flows to the southeast, more as a series of connected bogs and less as a real river, without almost any settlements on its banks. West of the village of Kelebia, the Körös-ér becomes a border river between Hungary and Serbia.

== Serbia ==
The Körös-ér flows on the northern border of Subotica proper, close to its neighboring settlements (most notably, Šupljak) and the Ludoš lake. After the villages of Male Pijace and Velebit, it turns east north of the village of Senćanski Trešnjevac and empties into the Tisa at Adorjan, at an elevation of 76 m (249 ft). Near the village of Velebit, Kereš flows through the marshy area of Kapetanski Rit.

For some time the municipal government of Kanjiža (to which the mouth of the river belongs) protests about the extreme pollution of the Kereš's water, as it represents the single largest polluter of the Tisa river. Local politicians point at the city government of Subotica, which dumps its waste into the river, as the major culprit for such a bad condition of the river.

The river is neither channeled nor navigable.

== History ==
The first known source that presents the river, together with its portions drawn on map, dates back to 1694 from count Marsigli, who uses the Latinism "Kiris".

== Wildlife ==
Körös-ér flows through the northern section of the Ludaš Lake. The Serbian-German project "Ekolakus" for fishing out the invasive Prussian carp from the nearby Lake Palić lasted from 2019 to October 2022. As Prussian carp almost exterminated indigenous fish species in the lake, as they were fished out, the number of local fish species significantly grew, partially thanks to the restocking. By 2022, via Krvavo Lake and canals which connect it to the Ludaš Lake, and further into the Körös-ér, northern pike and zander spread into the river. The protected species of weatherfish also appeared in Körös-ér.

== See also ==
- Rivers of Hungary
- Rivers of Serbia
