= Geography of Vojvodina =

Vojvodina is province in northern Serbia located in the Pannonian Basin, part of Central Europe. It shares Serbia's borders with Romania in the east, Hungary in the north, Croatia in the west, and Bosnia and Herzegovina in the southwest.

== Regions and sub-regions ==
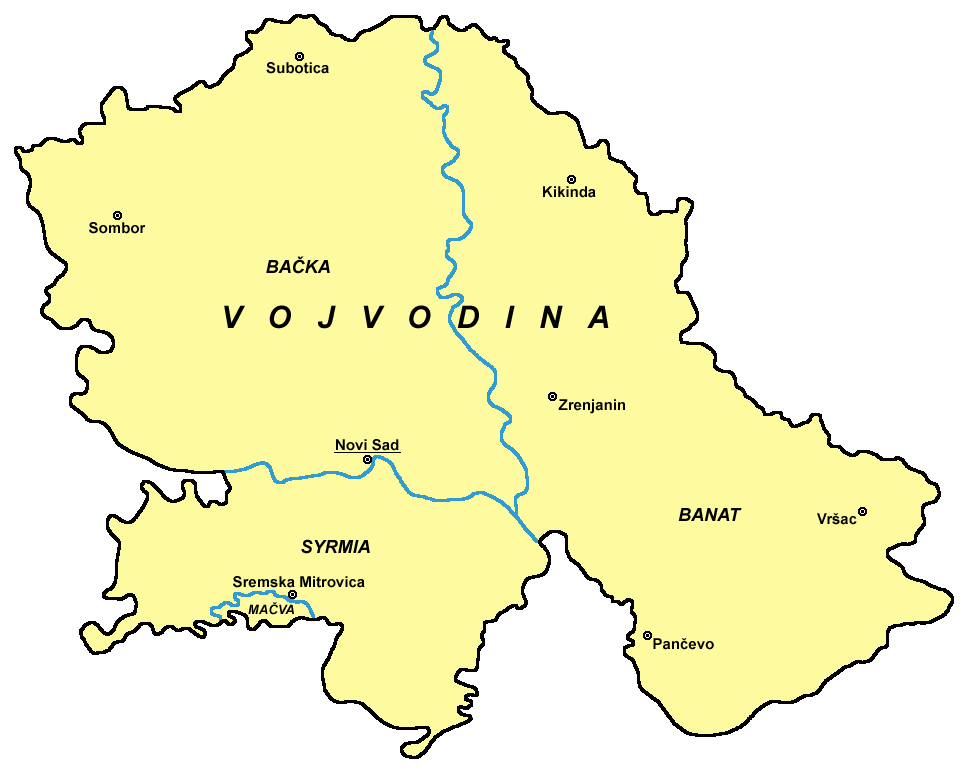
Map of Vojvodina

- Bačka
  - Podunavlje
  - Potisje
  - Šajkaška
- Banat
  - Pančevački Rit
  - Poljadija
- Syrmia
  - Fruška Gora
  - Podlužje
- Mačva

== Mountains ==
- Fruška Gora
- Vršac Mountains

== Rivers ==
- Danube
- Tisza (Tisa)
- Sava
- Bega (Begej)
- Timiș (Tamiš)
- Karaš
- Aranca (Zlatica)
- Nera
- Bosut
- Krivaja
- Čik
- Mostonga
- Plazović

== Lakes ==
- Lake Palić
- Ludaš Lake
- Lake Ledinci

== Canals and sub-canals ==
- Danube–Tisa–Danube Canal
  - Begej Canal
  - Jegrička Canal
  - Jarčina Canal

== Sands ==
- Deliblatska Peščara
- Subotička Peščara

== Gallery ==
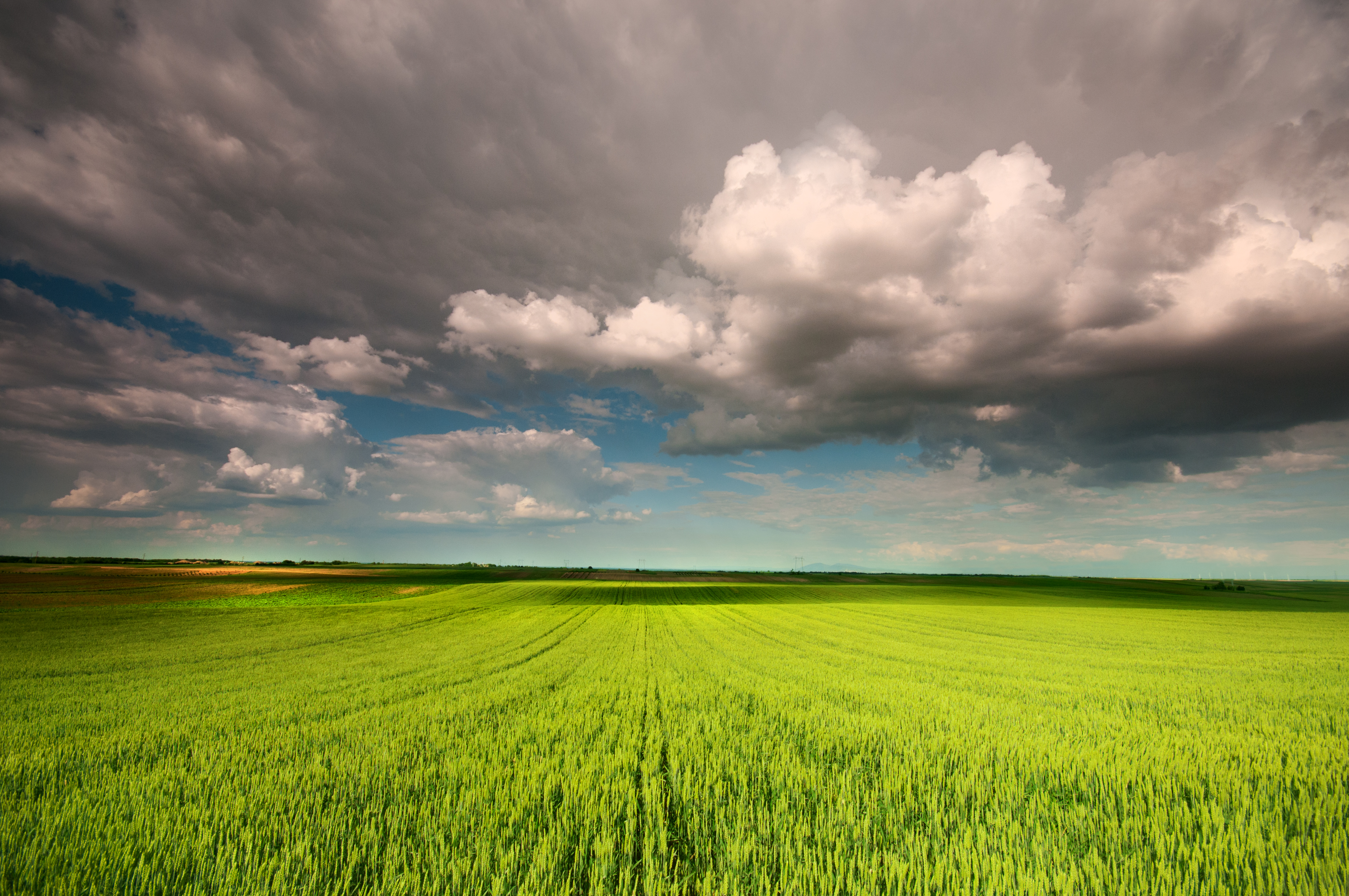
Banat

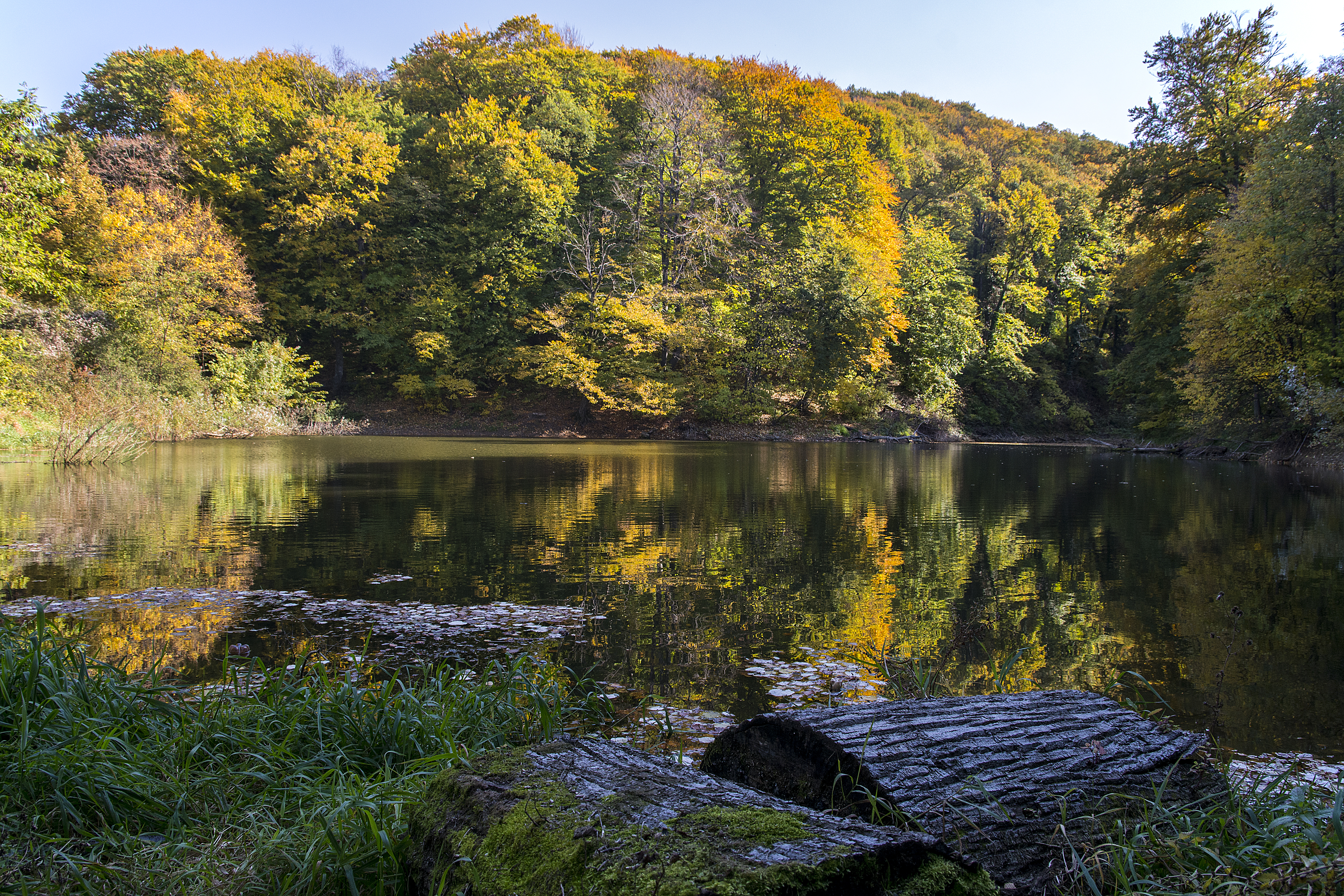
Fruška Gora

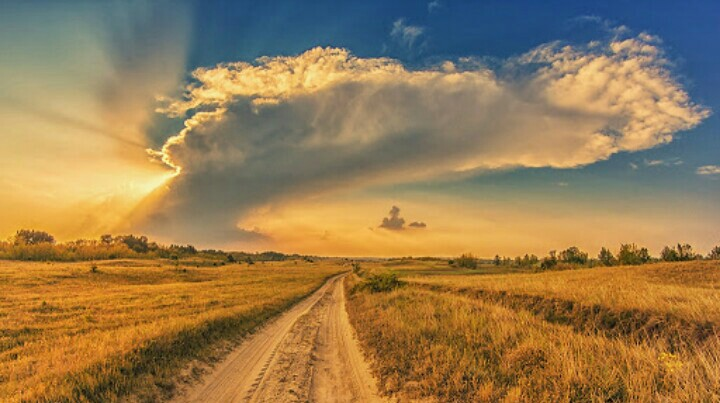
Deliblatska Peščara

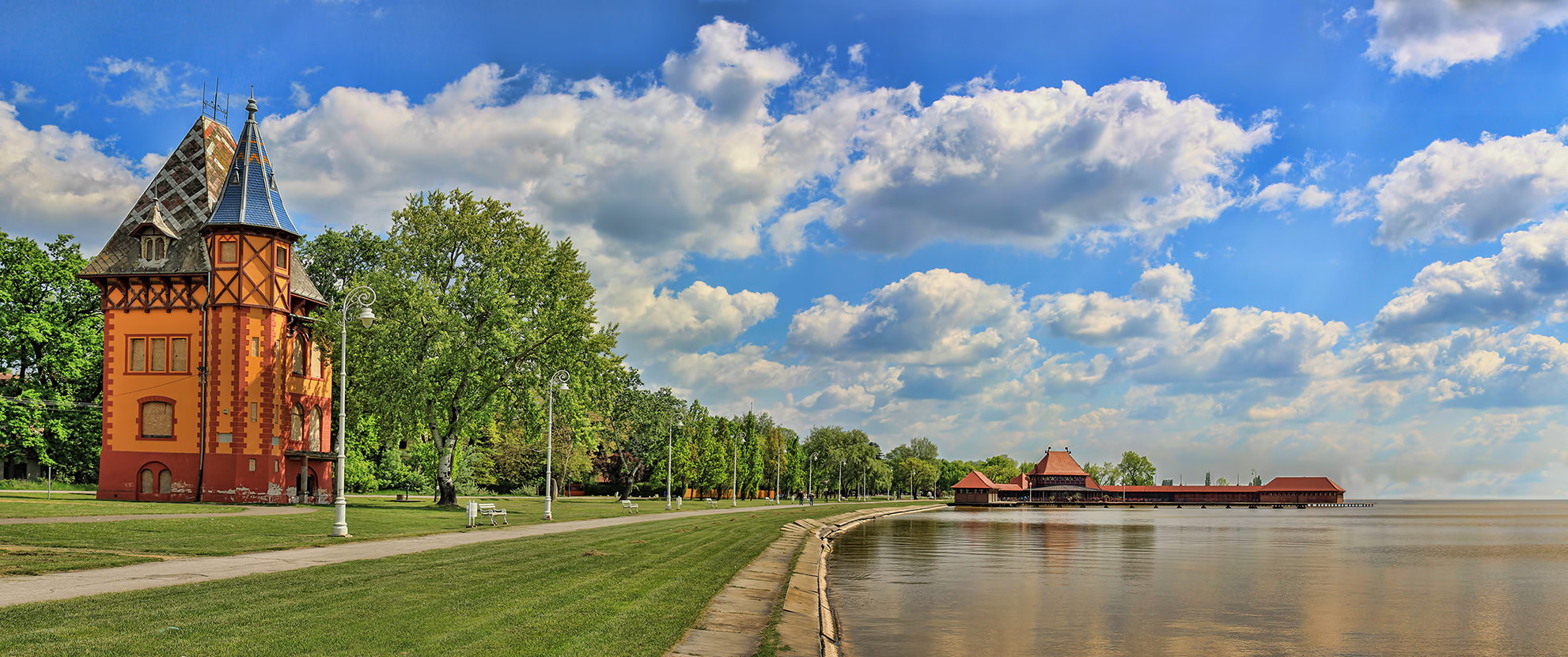
Lake Palić

== See also ==
- Geography of Serbia
