= Adorjan =

Adorjan may refer to:

- Adorjan, Serbia, a village in Vojvodina
- Adorjan Dorian Otvos (1893–1945), Hungarian-American writer and composer
- Adorján (disambiguation), a Hungarian name
