= List of protected areas in Serbia =

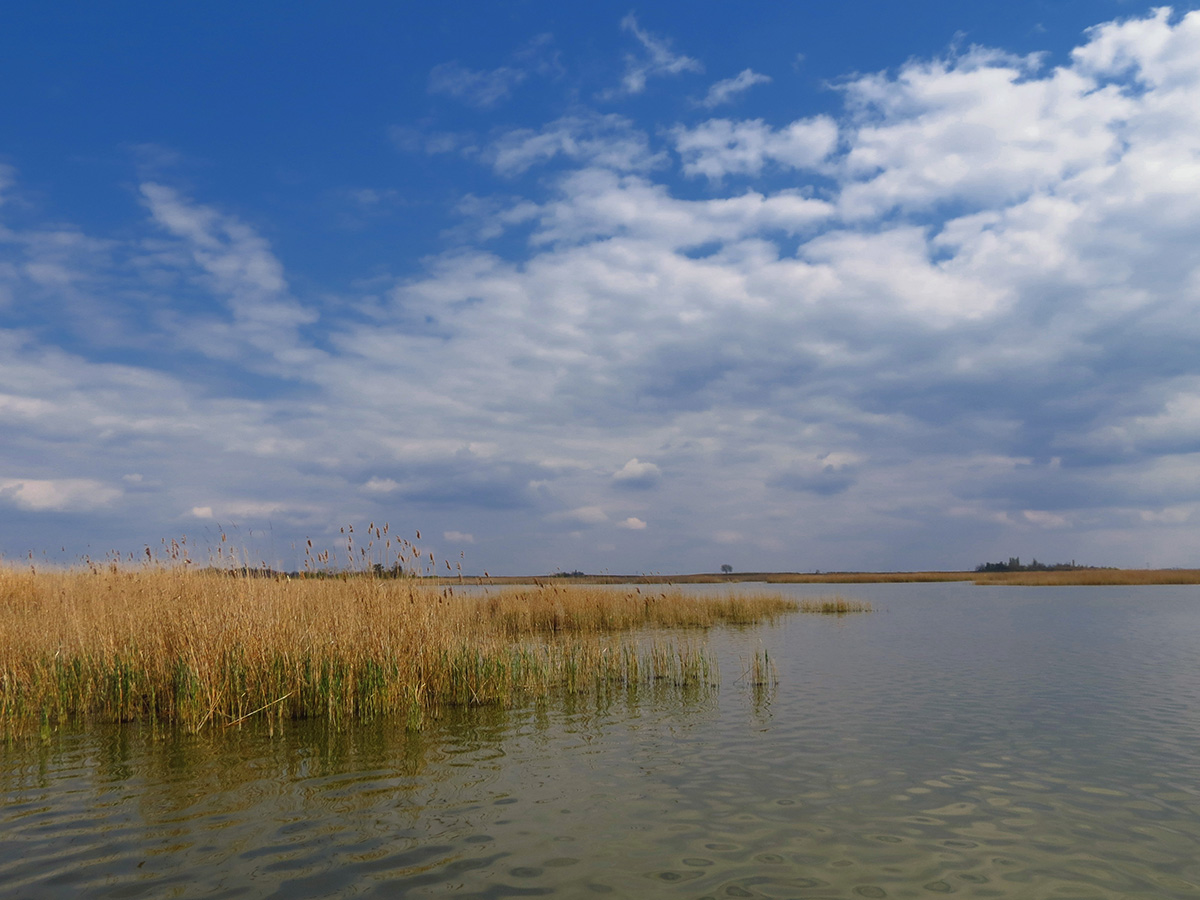
Ludaš Lake, a special nature reserve and, since 1977, designated as a wetland of international importance

Protected areas cover 7.3% of the territory of Serbia. The Law on the Protection of the Nature defines these categories of protected areas:

- National park — area with large number of diverse ecosystems of national value, with outstanding natural features and/or cultural heritage set aside for the preservation of its natural resources and for educational, scientific and tourist use.
- Strict nature reserve — area of unmodified natural features with representative ecosystems set aside for the preservation of its biodiversity and for scientific research and monitoring.
- Special nature reserve — area of unmodified or slightly modified natural features of great importance due to uniqueness and rarity which includes the habitats of endangered species set aside for the preservation of its unique features, education, limited tourism and for scientific research and monitoring.
- Nature park — area of well-preserved natural values with preserved natural ecosystems and picturesque landscape set aside for the preservation of biodiversity and for educational, tourist, recreational and scientific use.
- Landscape of outstanding features — area of remarkable appearance with important natural and cultural value.
- Natural monument — small unmodified or slightly modified natural feature, object or phenomenon, easily detectable and unique, with unique natural attributes.
- Protected habitat — area which includes habitats of one or more wildlife species.

== National parks ==
There are 4 national parks in Serbia (IUCN Category II) as of 2025, and two more which are proposed and in the procedure of receiving that status:

Location of the national parks

National park	Image	Established	Municipality/City	Area (km^{2})	Link
Đerdap		1974	Golubac, Majdanpek, Kladovo	636.8	
Kopaonik		1981	Raška, Brus	118.1	
Tara		1981	Bajina Bašta	192.0	
Fruška Gora		1960	Novi Sad, Sremski Karlovci, Beočin, Bačka Palanka, Šid, Sremska Mitrovica, Irig, Inđija	253.9	
Stara Planina		proposed	Pirot, Dimitrovgrad, Zaječar, Knjaževac	1,209.1	
Kučaj-Beljanica		proposed	Žagubica, Bor, Despotovac, Boljevac	453.7	

== Nature reserves ==
There are 41 nature reserves (IUCN category Ia) in Serbia and 6 more which are in the procedure of receiving that status.

Strict nature reserve	Established	Municipality/City	Area (km^{2})
Vinatovača		Despotovac	0.37
Danilova kosa	2008	Krupanj	0.06
Prokop	1958	Kruševac	0.06
Bukovo	2007	Negotin	0.1
Felješana	2014	Majdanpek	0.15
Kukavica	2014	Vladičin Han	0.76
Mustafa	2014	Majdanpek	0.80
Iznad Tatalije	2015	Bajina Bašta, Sjenica	0.008
Zelenika	2015	Užice	0.004
Jarešnik	2019	Bosilegrad	0.06
Special nature reserve	Established	Municipality/City	Area (km^{2})
Deliblatska Peščara	1965	Alibunar, Vršac, Bela Crkva, Požarevac, Kovin	348.29
Gornje Podunavlje		Apatin, Sombor	196
Venerina padina		Babušnica	0.003
Bagremara	2007	Bačka Palanka	1.2
Karađorđevo	1997	Bač, Bačka Palanka	29.5
Prebreza		Blace	29.5
Carska bara	1955	Zrenjanin	47.2
Kraljevac	2009	Kovin	2.6
Selevenjske pustare		Kanjiža, Subotica	6.7
Trešnjica River Gorge		Ljubovija	5.9
Koviljsko-petrovaradinski rit	1998	Novi Sad, Sremski Karlovci, Inđija, Titel	58.9
Jelašnička River Gorge		Niš	1.1
Uvac		Nova Varoš, Sjenica	75.4
Slano Kopovo	2000	Novi Bečej	9.7
Obedska bara	1968	Pećinci, Ruma	98.2
Zasavica	1997	Sremska Mitrovica, Bogatić	11.3
Ludaš Lake	1982	Subotica	8.4
Pastures of the Great Bustard		Kikinda, Čoka, Novi Kneževac	67.8
Paljevine	2011	Sjenica	0.08
Gutavica	2011	Sjenica	0.1
Titelski Breg	2012	Titel	4.9
Okanj	2013	Zrenjanin, Novi Bečej	54.8
Ritovi donjeg Potisja	2014	Titel, Žabalj, Novi Bečej, Zrenjanin	30.1
Mala jasenova glava	2014	Boljevac	0.06
Mileševka River Gorge	2014	Prijepolje	12.4
Jerma	2014	Babušnica, Dimitrovgrad, Pirot	69.9
Goč-Gvozdac	2014	Kraljevo, Vrnjačka Banja	39.5
Peštersko polje	2015	Tutin, Sjenica	31.2
Tesne Jaruge	2015	Nišla, Sjenica	0.03
Suva Planina	2015	Niška Banja, Bela Palanka, Gadžin Han	181.1
Rtanj	2019	Sokobanja, Boljevac	49.9

== Nature parks and Landscapes of outstanding features ==
There are 11 nature parks and 10 landscapes of outstanding features (IUCN Category Ib) with 1 and 7, respectively, which are in the procedure of receiving those statuses:

Nature park	Established	Municipality/City	Area (km^{2})
Tikvara		Bačka Palanka	5.1
Jegrička Nature Park		Bačka Palanka, Vrbas, Temerin, Žabalj	11.4
Stara Tisa		Bečej, Novi Bečej, Žabalj	3.9
Stara Planina	1997	Zaječar, Dimitrovgrad, Pirot, Knjaževac	1143.3
Golija	2001	Ivanjica, Kraljevo, Raška, Novi Pazar, Sjenica	751.8
Kamaraš		Kanjiža	2.6
Sićevo River Gorge	1997	Niš, Bela Palanka	77.4
Begečka jama		Novi Sad	3.8
Ponjavica		Pančevo	1.3
Lake Palić	1982	Subotica	7.1
Mokra Gora		Užice, Čajetina, Bajina Bašta	108.1
Zlatibor	proposed	Čajetina, Nova Varoš, Užice	321.7
Landscape of outstanding features	Established	Municipality/City	Area (km^{2})
Kosmaj		Belgrade/Mladenovac	35.1
Veliko Ratno Ostrvo		Belgrade/Zemun	1.7
Avala		Belgrade/Voždovac	4.9
River Pčinja Valley		Bujanovac	26
Gradac River Gorge		Valjevo	12.7
Vršac Mountains	1982	Vršac	44.1
Lepterija - Soko Grad		Sokobanja	8.38
Subotička Peščara		Subotica	53.7
Vlasina		Surdulica, Crna Trava	127.4
Ovčar-Kablar Gorge		Čačak, Lučani	22.5
Zaovine	proposed	Bajina Bašta	55.9
Radan	proposed	Kuršumlija, Prokuplje, Bojnik, Lebane, Medveđa	466.4
Đetinja River Gorge	proposed	Užice, Čajetina	8.6
Mali Rzav Springs	proposed	Arilje, Ivanjica	33.5
Ćelije Reservoir	proposed	Kruševac, Brus	39.6
Ras - Sopoćani	proposed	Novi Pazar	8.2
Kamena Gora	proposed	Prijepolje	78.1

== Natural monuments ==
There are currently 64 natural monuments of geological heritage and 225 monuments of botanical heritage (mostly rare trees) in Serbia. Some of the best known monuments of geological heritage are: Resava Cave and Đavolja Varoš.

== See also ==
- List of mountains in Serbia
- List of rivers of Serbia
- List of lakes of Serbia
- List of waterfalls in Serbia
