= Okica Gluščević =

Serbian journalist, writer and translator

- Born: 9 March 1858; Kamena Gora, Ottoman Empire
- Died: 2 December 1898 (aged 40); Belgrade, Serbia
- Resting place: Novo groblje Beograd
- Education: University of St. Petersburg
- Occupations: translator, writer
- Spouse: Nastasija
- Children: Mihajlo Gluščević, Boris Gluščević, Nadežda Čingrija, Olga Kojić
- Writing career
- Language: Serbian

Okica Gluščević (1858–1898) was a Serbian journalist, writer and translator. He is best known for translating Lord Byron's Manfred, Don Juan, Leon Tolstoy's War and Peace, and The Death of Ivan Ilyich. He was also the moving force behind the radical paper Odjek (Echo), founded in 1884 by his colleague Stojan Protić.

Gluščević was born on 9 March 1858 in Kamena Gora near Prijepolje, then part of the Sanjak of Herzegovina.

He contributed to the New Belgrade publications Poklić and Odjek, as well as numerous literary journals such as Javor, Bosanska Vila, Čas, Gusle, Delo, Zora. Though he died before completing his major work — War and Peace — it was his long-time friend and colleague Milovan Glišić, who completed the final chapters of his work after the "Srpska knjizevna zadruga" (Serbian Literary Society) turned to Glišić for help. He also translated (from Russian) the works of the following authors: Ivan Goncharov; Mikhail Saltykov-Schedrin; Vsevolod Garshin; Taras Schevchenko; Vladimir Korolenko; Mikhail Lermontov; and French author Guy de Maupassant.

In 1893 the Russian consul in Shkoder, Krilov, gave the first edition of Inok Sava Bukvar, printed in Venice on 20 May 1597, as a gift to Gluščević, who was translating War and Peace at the time. Later, in 1903, Ljuba Stojadinović, who was organizing the Catalogue of the National Library of Serbia, entered the book as part of Serbian literacy.
