= Krivaja (Great Bačka Canal) =

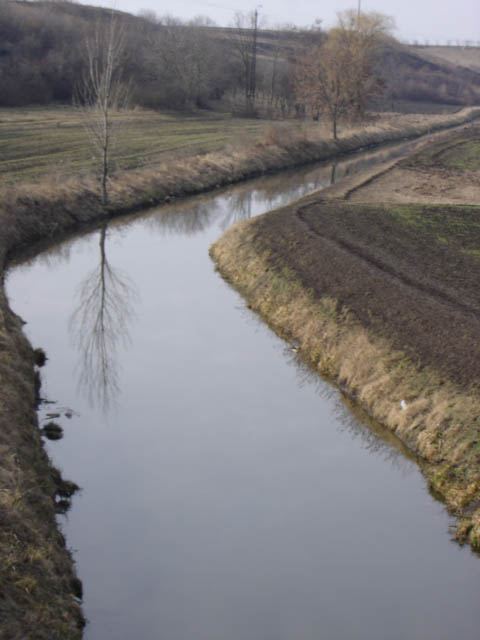
- Krivaja near Mali Iđoš
- Native name: Криваја (Serbian)

Location
- Country: Serbia

Physical characteristics
- Source
  - location: Subotička Peščara, Vojvodina
  - elevation: 131 m (430 ft)
- Mouth
  - location: Great Bačka Canal at Turija, Vojvodina
  - coordinates: 45.5451°N 19.8494°E
- Length: 109 km (68 mi)
- Basin size: 956 km^{2} (369 sq mi)

Basin features
- Progression: Great Bačka Canal→ Tisza→ Danube→ Black Sea

The Krivaja (Serbian Cyrillic: Криваја) is a river in northern Serbia. With the length of 109 km (68 mi) it is the longest river that flows completely within the borders of Serbian province of Vojvodina.

== Upper Course ==
The Krivaja springs out in the Subotička Peščara, from the several streams which meet southwest of the village of Žednik. The longest stream originates from Pavlovac hillock (Serbian Cyrillic: Павловац) northeast of Bajmok, one of the most populous villages in Vojvodina. The stream passes between the village of Đurđin and Jaramazov hillock (Јарамазов) before it meets the shorter, northern stream (already named the Krivaja) and continues to the south.

The river passes next to the villages of Mali Beograd and Zobnatica, a tourist resort and site of the famous stud-farm, before it reaches the town of Bačka Topola. At Zobnatica, the Krivaja is dammed, creating a 5.5 km (3.4 mi) long artificial Zobnatica Lake, with an area of 255 km^{2} (98 sq mi), used for irrigation and tourism.

== Lower Course ==
The river turns west after the Bačka Topola and then turns sharply again to the southeast, near the village of Bajša and all three settlements that constitute the municipality of Mali Iđoš: the small town of Mali Iđoš and the villages of Lovćenac and Feketić. At the town of Srbobran, the Krivaja turns east, carving a shallow, 15 km (9.3 mi) long valley, in which it meanders for 33 km (21 mi) before it empties into the Great Bačka Canal, part of the Canal Danube-Tisa-Danube. Total meandering ratio of the whole river is 65:109 (in the valley 15:33), thus the name (Krivaja; Serbian for winding river). The village of Turija stands on the Krivaja's mouth into the canal, at an altitude of 76 m.

The Krivaja drains an area of 956 km^{2} (369 sq mi), belongs to the Black Sea drainage basin and it is not navigable.

== Pollution ==
A 20 years-long survey by the Serbian Environmental Protection Agency, published in 2019, showed that rivers in Vojvodina are the most polluted in Serbia. Of 10 most polluted rivers, 9 were from Vojvodina and total of 79% specimen from Vojvodina's rivers had "very bad results". Krivaja is especially polluted in the lower section, downstream from Bačka Topola, and has been "ecological black spot" for years. Water is used for city's industry. Additionally, the dam upstream holds more water for farm irrigation during summers than it should, so the river is turned into the slow open sewage canal.

The river is almost disappearing, being colloquially called "Nemaja" ("No river"). The frogs disappeared while flies and mosquitos thrive. Irrigation is used on 720 ha (1,800 acres) of the "Feketić" agricultural farm, who claim they need water and they pay it to "Vojvodina Vode", province owned company in charge of water. Representative of the farm said "we call them to regulate the dam when the water level is insufficient, which they always so. What happens below the dam, we don't know". "Vojvodina Vode" claimed they have a project of another reservoir, at Srbobran, which will solve the problem. Local environmentalists are not convinced as previous solution by the company, dredging of the river, was fatal for the wildlife.

== See also ==
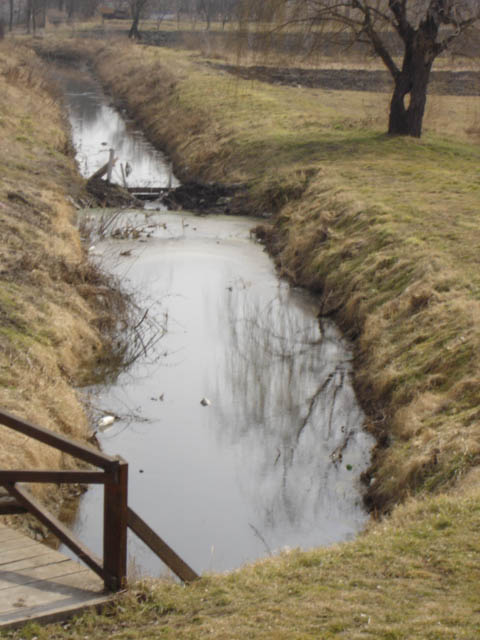
Krivaja in Pačir

- Geography of Serbia
- Geography of Vojvodina
- List of most-polluted rivers

== Sources ==
- Mala Prosvetina Enciklopedija, Third edition (1985); Prosveta; ISBN 86-07-00001-2
- Jovan Đ. Marković (1990): Enciklopedijski geografski leksikon Jugoslavije Svjetlost-Sarajevo; ISBN 86-01-02651-6
