= Selevenj heath =

Coordinates: 46.138°N 19.937°E

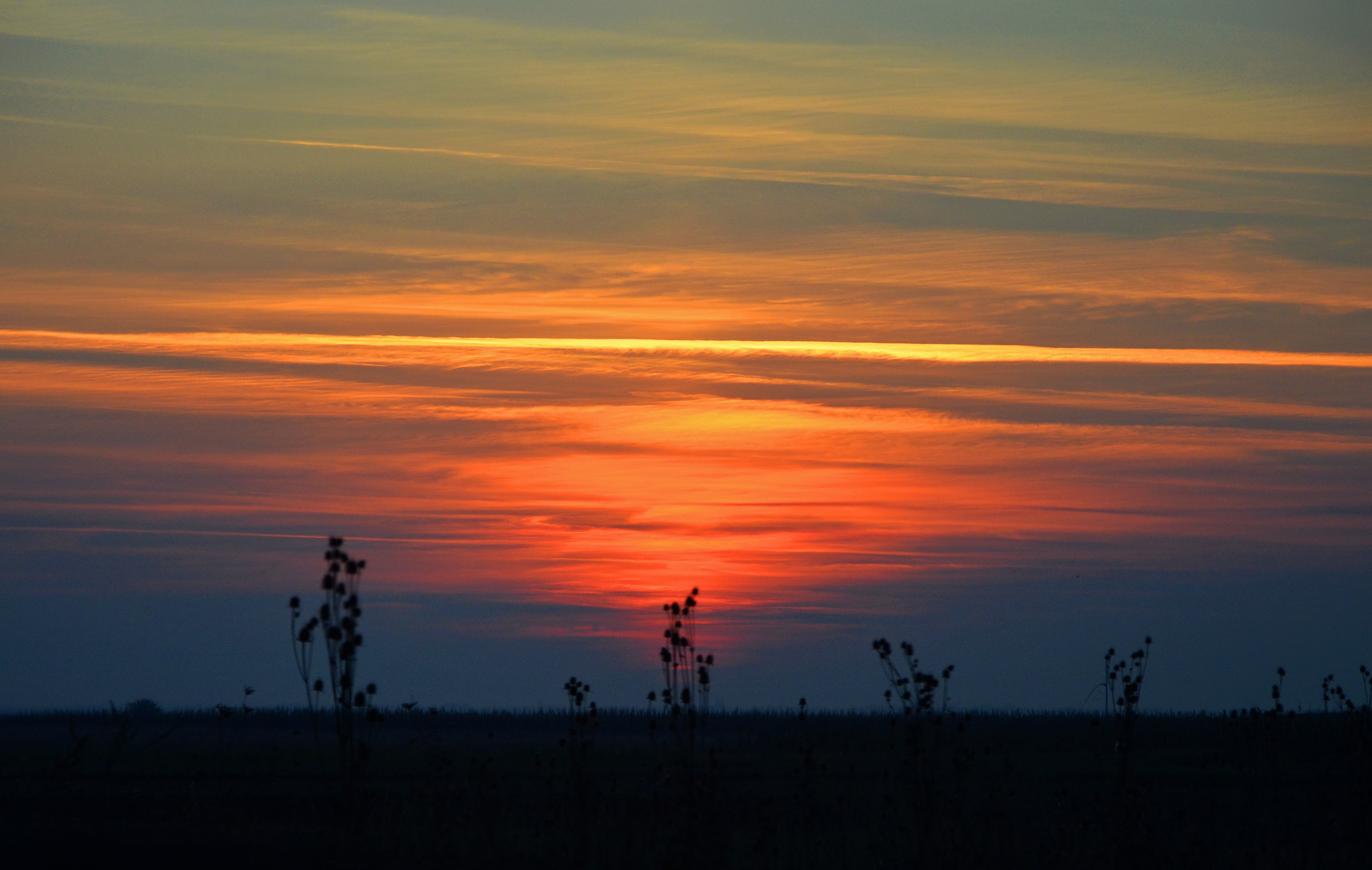
Selevenjske Heath at sunset.

Selevenj heath or Selevenjske pustare is a Pannonian heath type reserve in the Kanjiža and Subotica municipalities in the Autonomous Province of Vojvodina in Serbia. The reserve with an area of 6.77 km^{2} has never been urbanised and is protected as a special nature reserve. It consists of areas criss-crossed with orchards, fields and vineyards and is primarily used for botanical conservation.

== Flora ==
The Selevenj heath special nature reserve is the only location in Serbia where the desert soapwort grows. Protected species of orchid and iris can be found in the reserve.

== Fauna ==
Internationally protected species like sand lizards, bats and rare birds live in the Selevenj heath special nature reserve. The reserve is one of few places in Serbia where the scarce large blue can be found.

== Tourism ==
A couple of marked trails lead through the special nature reserve. Guided rangers tours are available to discover the area.
