= Kamena Gora (mountain) =

Mountain on the border of Serbia and Montenegro

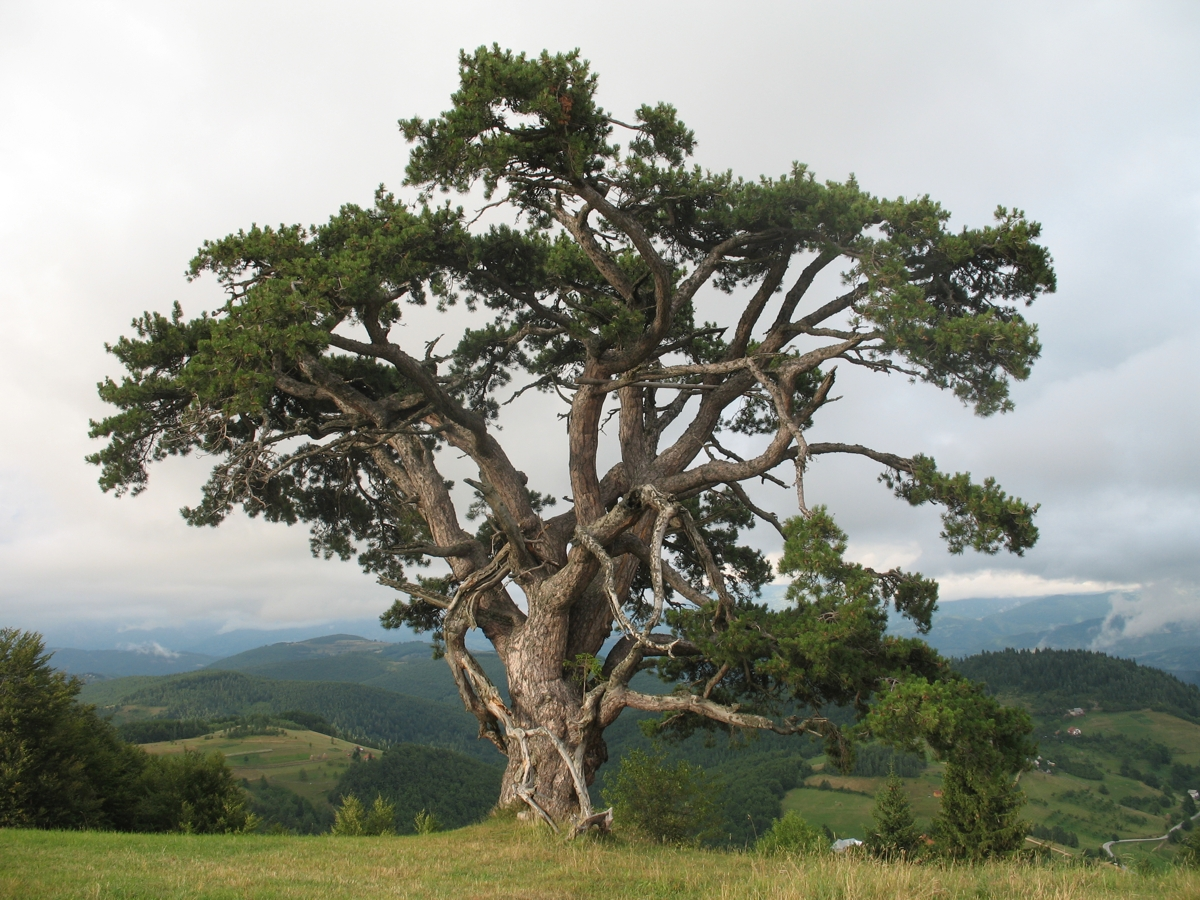
- 500-year-old pine tree on the mountain

Highest point
- Elevation: 1,496 m (4,908 ft)
- Coordinates: 43°18′12″N 19°32′27″E

Geography
- Location within Serbia
- Location: Serbia / Montenegro
- Parent range: Dinaric Alps

Kamena gora (Serbian Cyrillic: Камена гора, pronounced [kâmenaː ɡǒra]) is a mountain on the border of Serbia and Montenegro, near the town of Prijepolje. Its highest peaks are Crni vrh on the Montenegrin side, and Ravna gora on the Serbian side, with an elevation of 1496 m each.

An area of 78.07 hectares on the mountain has the status of a nature park in the national register of protected resources. The famous "Holy pine", estimated to be 500 years old, is also proposed for protection as a "botanic natural monument".

Tourist access and facilities are centered on the village of Kamena Gora on the slopes of the mountain.

== See also ==
- List of mountains in Serbia

== See also ==
- List of mountains in Serbia
