= Adorján =

Adorján may refer to:

- András Adorján (1950–2023), Hungarian chess grandmaster
- Csató Adorján, Hungarian rapper
- István Adorján (1913–1987), Hungarian cyclist
- János Adorján (1938–1995), Hungarian handball player
- Krisztián Adorján (born 1993), Hungarian footballer
- Zoltán Adorján (born 1961), Hungarian speedway rider
- Adorján, the Hungarian name of Adrian, a village near Livada, Satu Mare, Romania
- Adorján, the Hungarian name of Adorjan, Serbia, a village
