= Palić =

Palić Палић (Serbian) Palics (Hungarian)
- Town
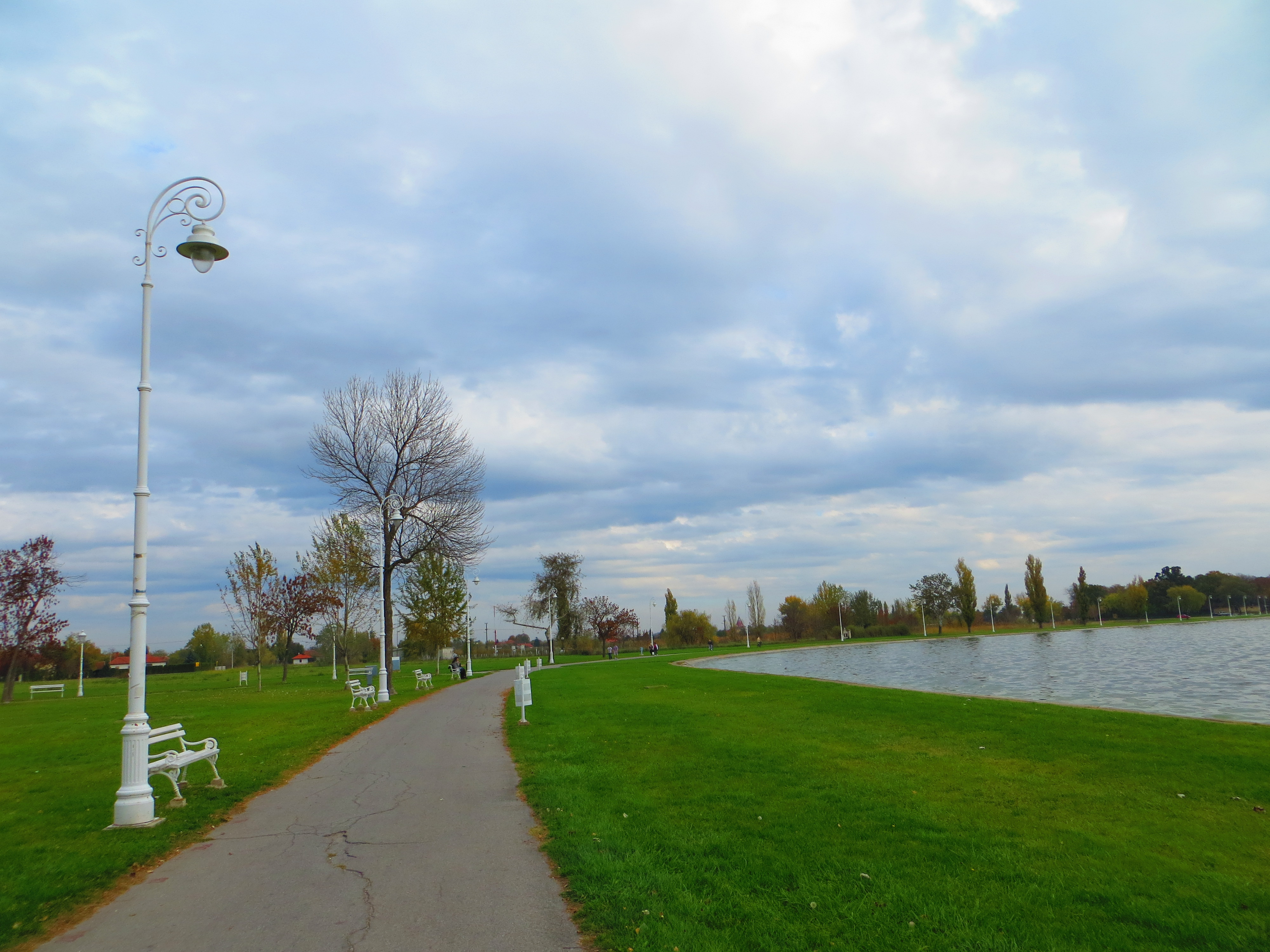
- Lake Palić

- Location within Vojvodina Location within Serbia Location within Europe
- Coordinates: 46°06′11″N 19°45′31″E
- Country: Serbia
- Province: Vojvodina
- District: North Bačka

Area
  - Total: 40.99 km^{2} (15.83 sq mi)
- Elevation: 99 m (325 ft)

Population (2022)
  - Total: 5,476
- Time zone: UTC+1 (CET)
  - Summer (DST): UTC+2 (CEST)
- Postal code: 24413
- Area code: (+381)24, 024
- Car plates: SU
- Website: palic.rs

Palić (Serbian Cyrillic: Палић; Hungarian: Palics; German: Palitsch) is a town located in the administrative area of the City of Subotica, in the North Bačka District, Vojvodina, Serbia, 18 kilometres (11 mi) from the border between Serbia and Hungary. The town has a population of 5,476 inhabitants (2022 census).

Many tourists come to Palić every year because of the Lake Palić and spa. There are over 450 guest houses and a five-star hotel. It is known for its Palić European Film Festival which takes place every summer.

== Demographics ==
=== Historical population ===
- 1961: 6,135
- 1971: 7,253
- 1981: 6,974
- 1991: 7,375
- 2002: 7,745
- 2011: 7,771
- 2022: 5,476

=== Ethnic groups ===
According to data from the 2022 census, ethnic groups in the village include:

- 2,796 (51%) Hungarians
- 1,328 (24.2%) Serbs
- 215 (3.9%) Croats
- 179 (3.2%) Bunjevci
- Others/Undeclared/Unknown

== Cityscape ==
Unique in Serbia, Palić and adjacent Subotica have the most buildings built in the Hungarian Secession style, a distinct variant of Art Nouveau. The Hungarian Secession style was operational between the 1890s and World War I. Its designs combined art nouveau vegetal ornaments and symbolic figures with traditional Hungarian motifs. It found its architectural expression in Palić in the works of Marcell Komor, Dezső Jakab.

Palić Hungarian Secession buildings

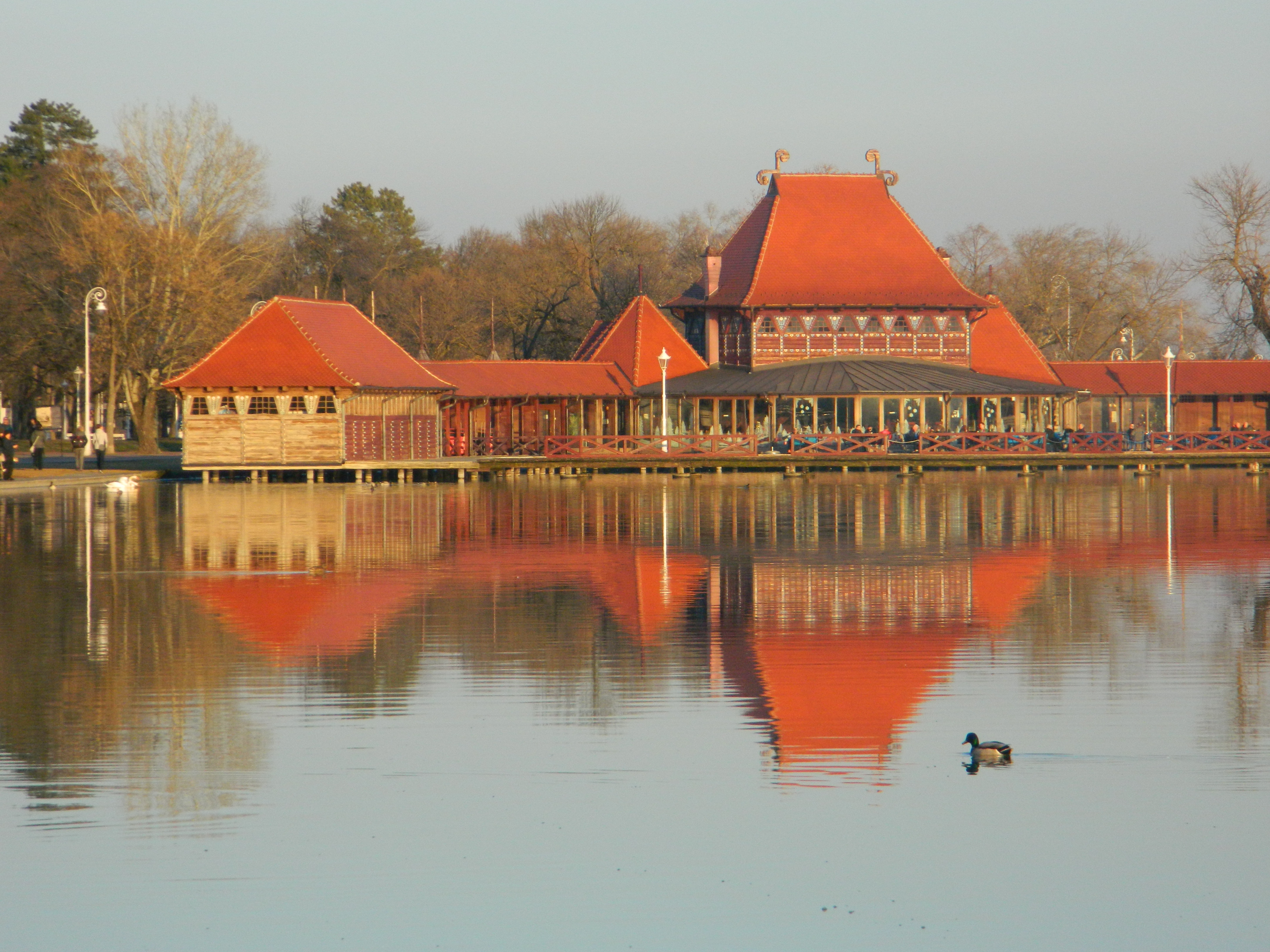
Women's Lido

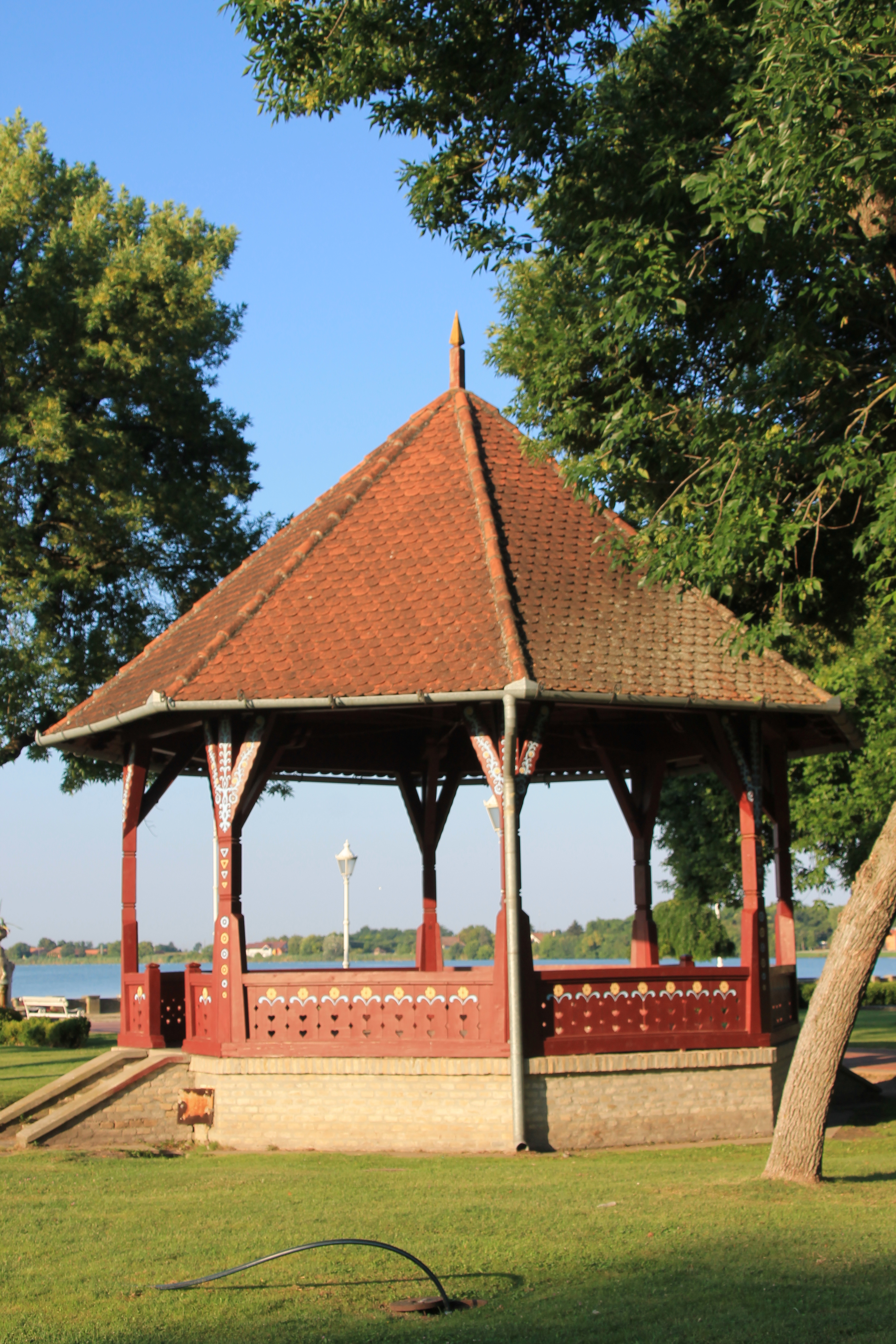
Music pavilion

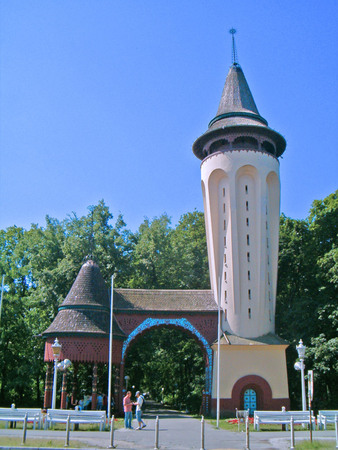
Water tower

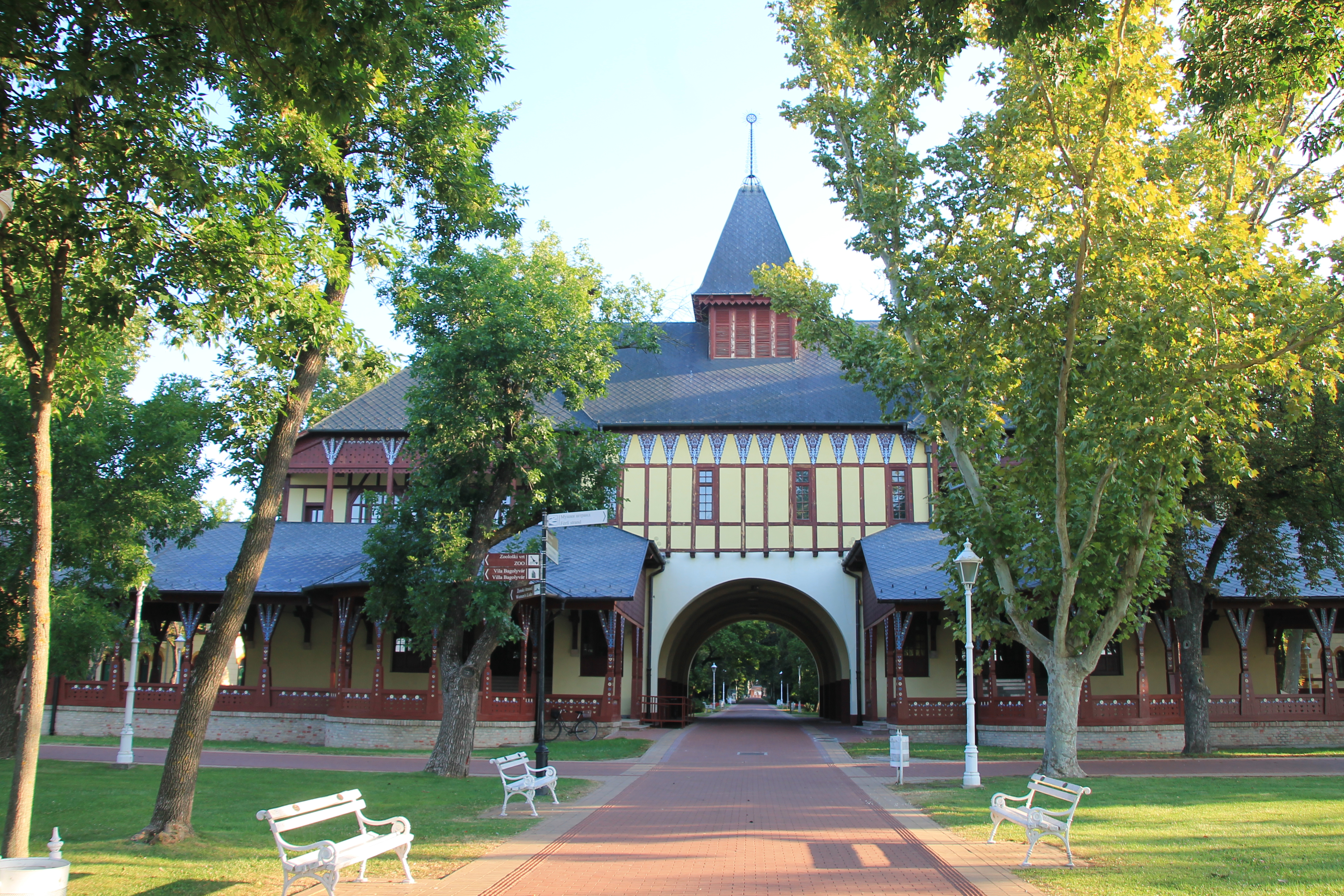
Kursaal

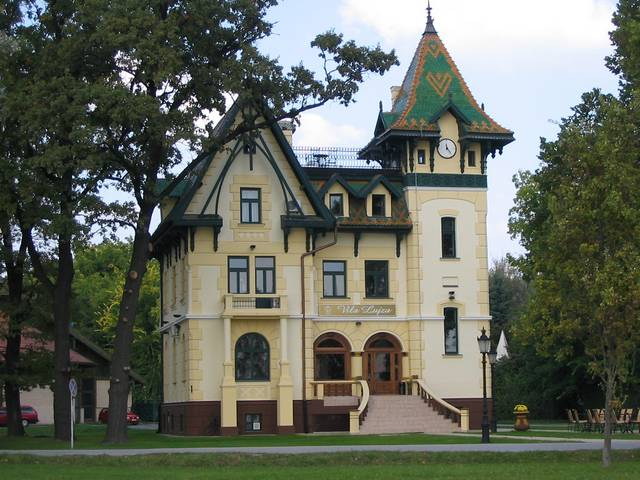
Villa Lujza

== Lake Palić ==
The Lake Palić covers an area of 380 hectares (940 acres), with a 17-kilometre (11 mi) shore line. The average depth of the lake is 2 metres (6 ft 7 in), and there are many fish in it. In 1995, the Tisa-Palić canal was opened so that the lake would remain as healthy as it was before in spite of development around the lake. Swimming in the lake is strictly not recommended due to poor water quality and pollution.

== Climate ==
Palić has a humid subtropical climate (Köppen climate classification: Cfa) with hot summers and cold winters. With 2,190 hours of sunshine annually it is amongst Serbia's sunniest cities.

Climate data for Palic (1991–2020, extremes 1961–2020)
Month	Jan	Feb	Mar	Apr	May	Jun	Jul	Aug	Sep	Oct	Nov	Dec	Year
Record high °C (°F)	16.4 (61.5)	19.9 (67.8)	27.5 (81.5)	29.8 (85.6)	34.0 (93.2)	36.7 (98.1)	38.2 (100.8)	38.6 (101.5)	35.3 (95.5)	29.2 (84.6)	23.0 (73.4)	17.3 (63.1)	38.6 (101.5)
Mean daily maximum °C (°F)	3.5 (38.3)	6.3 (43.3)	11.9 (53.4)	17.9 (64.2)	22.8 (73.0)	26.6 (79.9)	28.6 (83.5)	28.9 (84.0)	23.3 (73.9)	17.6 (63.7)	10.5 (50.9)	4.2 (39.6)	16.8 (62.2)
Daily mean °C (°F)	0.2 (32.4)	1.9 (35.4)	6.5 (43.7)	12.3 (54.1)	17.3 (63.1)	21.2 (70.2)	22.9 (73.2)	22.5 (72.5)	17.1 (62.8)	11.6 (52.9)	6.3 (43.3)	1.2 (34.2)	11.8 (53.2)
Mean daily minimum °C (°F)	−2.7 (27.1)	−1.8 (28.8)	2.1 (35.8)	6.8 (44.2)	11.6 (52.9)	15.4 (59.7)	16.8 (62.2)	16.5 (61.7)	12.0 (53.6)	7.3 (45.1)	2.9 (37.2)	−1.5 (29.3)	7.1 (44.8)
Record low °C (°F)	−25.2 (−13.4)	−21.5 (−6.7)	−19.9 (−3.8)	−4.2 (24.4)	−0.4 (31.3)	3.7 (38.7)	7.6 (45.7)	6.3 (43.3)	−0.4 (31.3)	−6.1 (21.0)	−14.3 (6.3)	−21.4 (−6.5)	−25.2 (−13.4)
Average precipitation mm (inches)	33.0 (1.30)	37.4 (1.47)	34.7 (1.37)	40.3 (1.59)	62.1 (2.44)	73.9 (2.91)	62.9 (2.48)	51.7 (2.04)	55.9 (2.20)	50.1 (1.97)	43.6 (1.72)	43.5 (1.71)	589.1 (23.19)
Average precipitation days (≥ 0.1 mm)	12.0	11.2	10.3	10.7	12.6	10.8	9.9	8.4	10.1	9.6	10.8	12.7	129.1
Average snowy days	5.6	5.8	2.6	0.4	0.0	0.0	0.0	0.0	0.0	0.0	2.2	4.8	21.4
Average relative humidity (%)	85.3	79.8	69.7	64.2	64.3	63.5	62.0	63.4	70.2	76.4	82.9	87.0	72.4
Mean monthly sunshine hours	70.4	104.3	162.5	210.1	252.3	271.3	300.7	288.9	209.9	163.7	93.2	60.8	2,188.1
Source: Republic Hydrometeorological Service of Serbia

== Sports ==
Local football club FK Palić has competed in the third-tier Serbian League Vojvodina.

== Twin Town ==
- Újszász, Hungary

== See also ==
- Lake Palić
- Subotica
- List of places in Serbia
- List of cities, towns and villages in Vojvodina
