= Male Pijace =

Kispiac Mali Pijace (Serbian) Мале Пијаце (Serbian) Kispiac (Hungarian)
- Village (Selo)
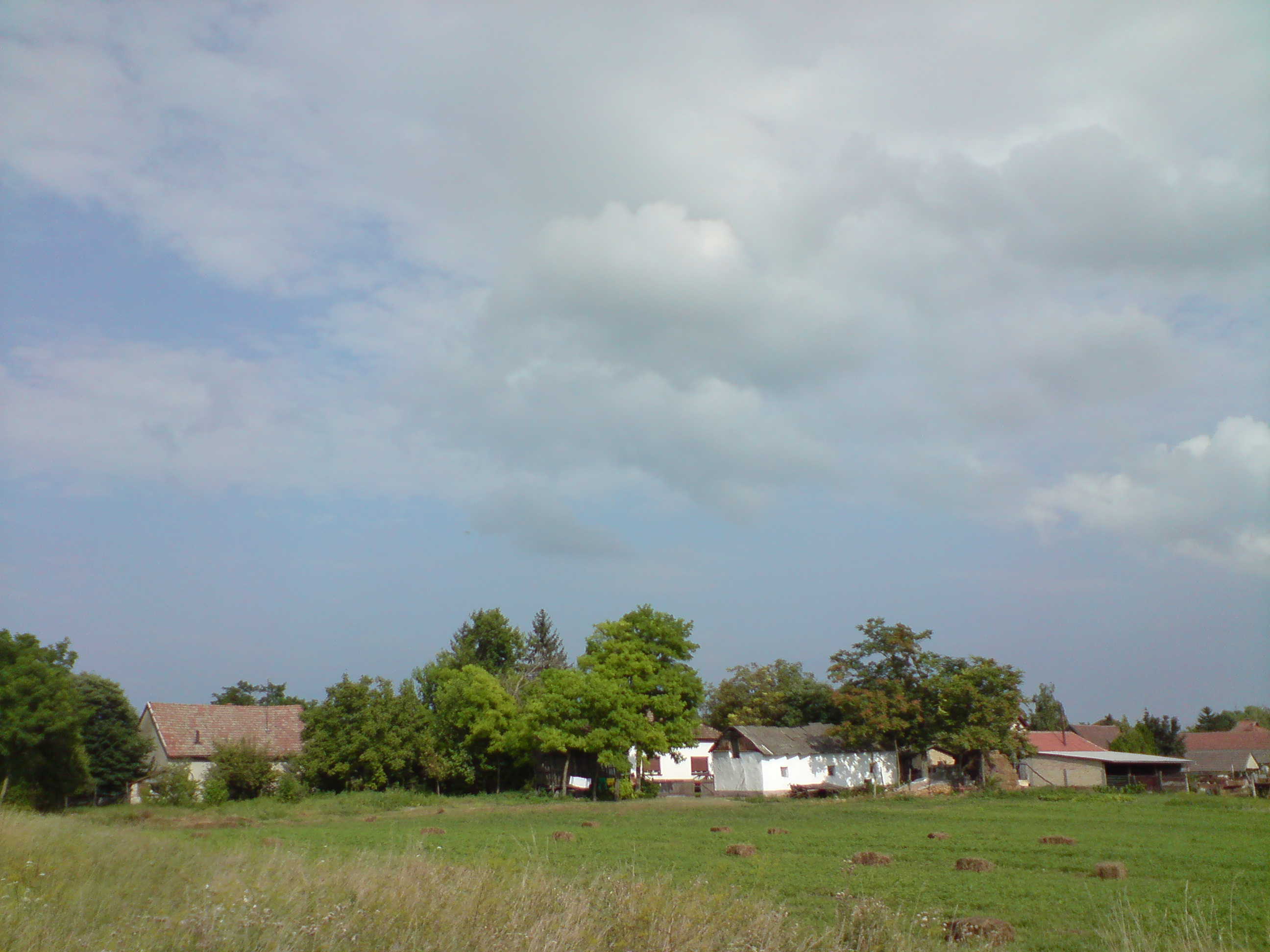
- View of the village

- Location of Vojvoda Zimonić within Serbia Kispiac (Serbia) Kispiac (Europe)
- Coordinates: 46°04′16″N 19°56′01″E
- Country: Serbia
- Province: Vojvodina
- District: North Banat
- Municipalities: Kanjiža
- Elevation: 77 m (253 ft)

Population (2002)
  - Mali Pijace: 1,989
- Time zone: UTC+1 (CET)
  - Summer (DST): UTC+2 (CEST)
- Postal code: 24416
- Area code: +381(0)24
- Car plates: KA

Male Pijace (in Serbian Cyrillic: Мале Пијаце, in Hungarian: Kispiac) is a village in Serbia. It is situated in the Kanjiža municipality, in the North Banat District, Vojvodina province. The village has a Hungarian ethnic majority (96.37%) and its population numbering 1,988 people (2002 census).

== See also ==
- List of places in Serbia
- List of cities, towns and villages in Vojvodina
