= Kamena Gora =

- Village
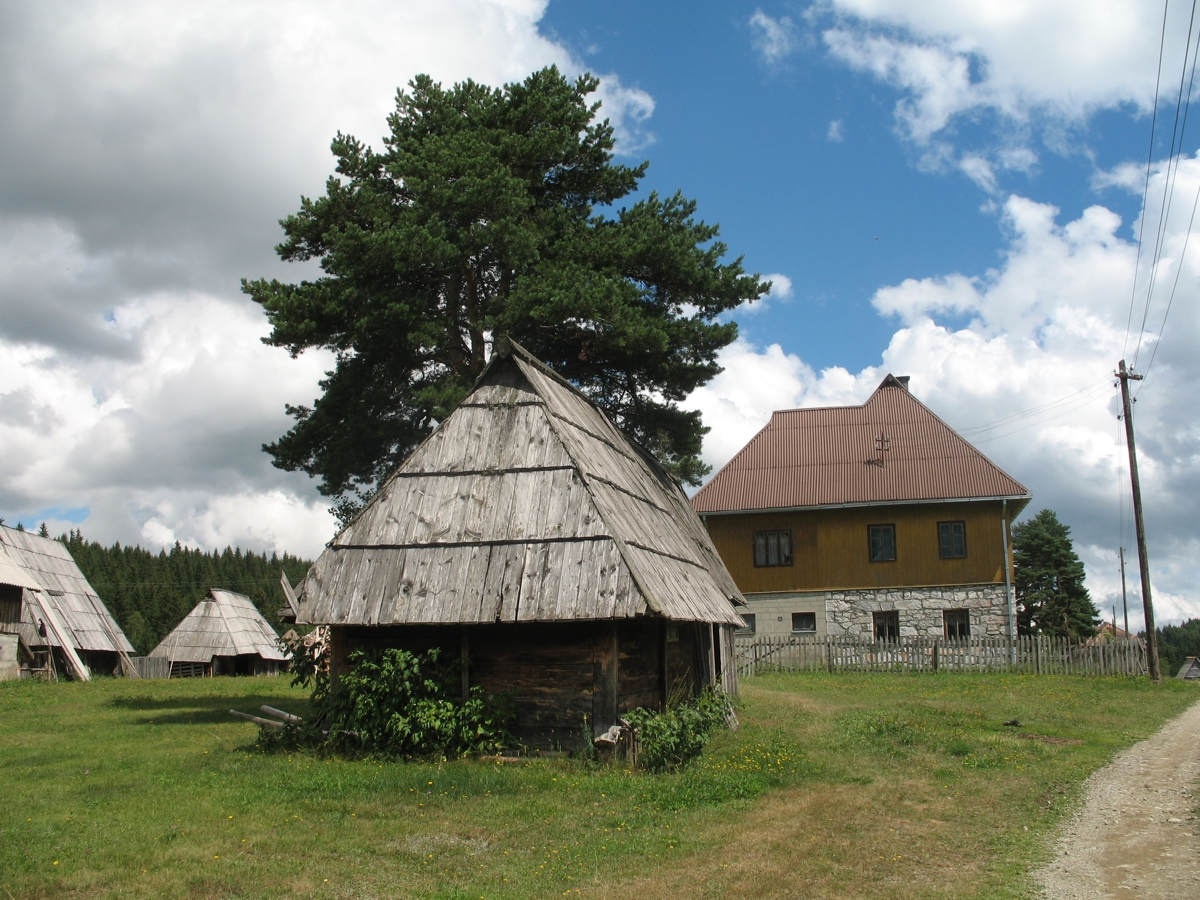
- Traditional houses in Kamena Gora

- Location within Serbia
- Coordinates: 43°17′N 19°33′E
- Country: Serbia
- District: Zlatibor District
- Municipality: Prijepolje

Population (2022)
  - Total: 103
- Time zone: UTC+1 (CET)
  - Summer (DST): UTC+2 (CEST)
- Website: http://www.kamenagora.com/

Kamena Gora is a village in the municipality of Prijepolje, Serbia. It lies at an altitude between 800 and 1500 m on the eponymous mountain.

According to the 2022 census, the village has a population of 103 people.

== Name ==
The small village's name means "rocky mountain" coming from the words "kamen/камен" meaning rock, and "gora/гора" meaning mountain in the native Serbian
