= Ludaš Lake =

Lake in Subotica, Serbia

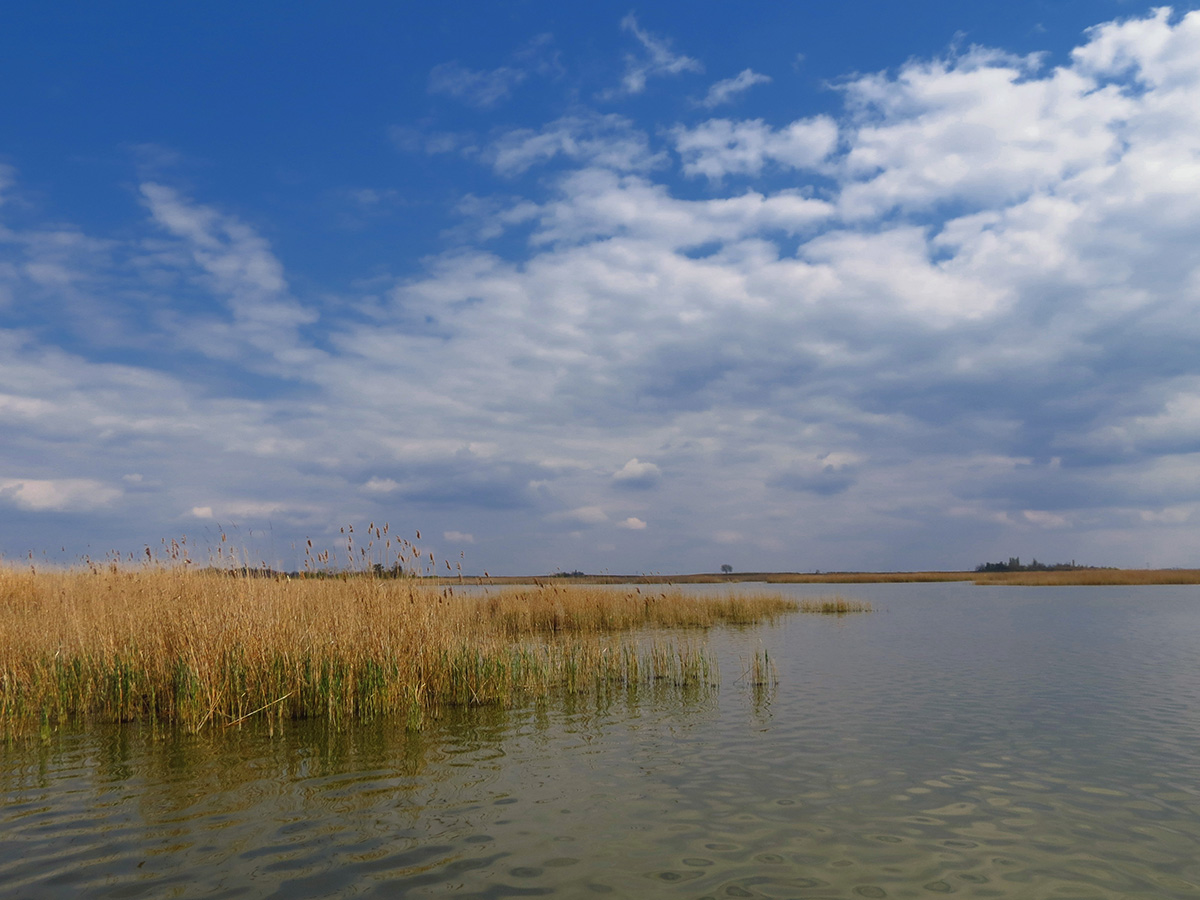

- Location within Serbia
- Location: Subotica, Serbia
- Coordinates: 46.10°N 19.82°E
- Type: natural aeolian
- Primary inflows: Kireš and Čurgo creeks
- Primary outflows: Kereš river (Tisa river)
- Basin countries: Serbia
- Max. length: 4.5 km (2.8 mi)
- Surface area: 3.28 km^{2} (1.27 sq mi)
- Average depth: 1 m (3 ft 3 in)
- Max. depth: 2.5 m (8 ft 2 in)
- Surface elevation: 93 m (305 ft)

Ramsar Wetland
- Official name: Ludasko Lake
- Designated: 28 March 1977
- Reference no.: 137

Ludaš or Ludoš Lake (Serbian: Ludaško / Ludoško jezero; Hungarian: Ludas or Ludasi-tó) is a shallow lake in the province of Vojvodina in northern Serbia, near the city of Subotica. It is a special natural preserve and, since 1977, designated as a swamp area of international significance by the Ramsar Convention. The name of the lake stems from Hungarian "ludas", meaning goose.

== Geography ==
The lake is located 12 kilometers southeast of Subotica, 10 km away from the E75 motorway, near the villages of Šupljak and Hajdukovo. About 4.5 km long, it stretches in north–south direction. It lies on the sandy terrain between Danube and Tisza rivers, at the borderline of Bačka loessial plateau. Its northern part is wider and swampy, while the southern part is embedded into loess, with shores 3–4 m high. The bottom of the lake is made of watertight layer of white clay, covered with mud. The water is shallow, with the average depth of just 1 m and reaching the maximum depth of 2.25 m. The lake freezes up to three months a year, and in the summer its temperature can reach as high as 30 °C (86 °F).

The lake is of aeolian origin, and its bed was formed approximately 1 million years ago, as winds emptied the sand dunes along the clay plateau. Before the water regulation system in the area was introduced, it used to be a swamp, supplied by natural precipitation and several small water streams, while a branch of the Kereš River takes the extraneous water away into Tisza. Today, it also receives water influx from the Palić-Ludaš and Bega canals.

== Biodiversity ==
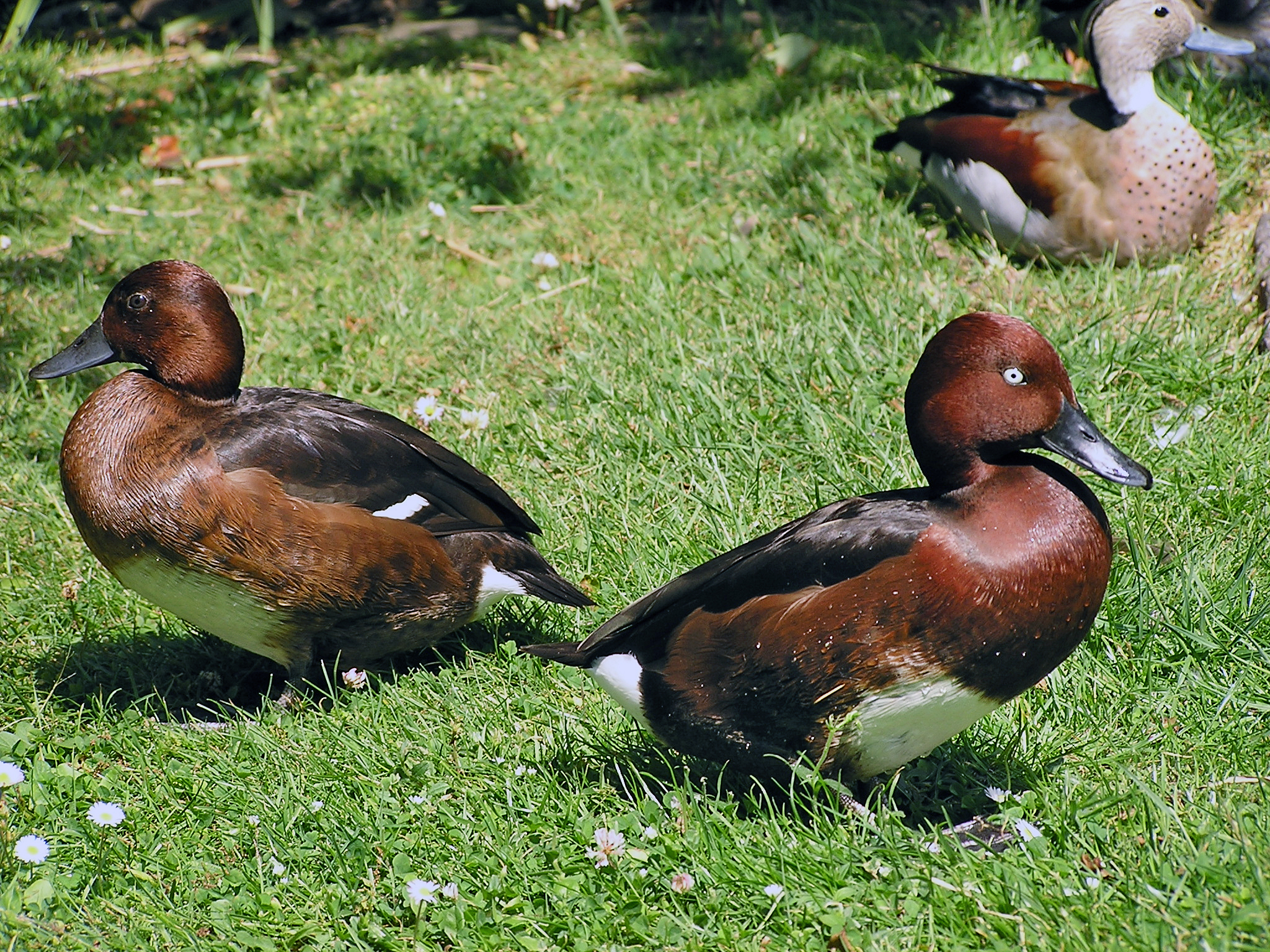
Ferruginous duck

The lake and its surrounding are home to diverse habitats (aquatic, swamp, meadow and steppe), with a number of plant and animal species. Protected lax-flowered orchid (Orchis laxiflora) is abundant on the meadow lowland terrain around the lake. Several other rare plants found their shelter here, such as: milk-vetch (Astragalus exscapus), wind flower (Pulsatilla pratensis), sage (Salvia austriaca), herbaceous periwinkle (Vinca herbacea), golden ragwort (Senecio doria).

There are 214 recorded species of birds, 140 of them being protected as natural rarities. Most of the species are migratory. Richness of birds is one of the primary reasons for the environmental protection of the lake's area. Bearded reedling is the most outstanding characteristic bird, while white-headed duck, ferruginous duck and moustached warbler are just some listed on the IUCN Red List.

Land fauna is represented with some 20 species, of those, the European otter is a near-threatened species.

The first act of nature protection of the lake was passed in 1955, and in 1958 the area was designated as a strict nature reserve, covering an area of 6.33 square kilometres. In 1982, the area became an integral part of the "Palić-Ludaš" regional part, which was divided into two areas after building of the E-75 motorway in 1991. Efforts for the international protection status were first introduced in 1973, when the Executive Council of Vojvodina nominated the lake to the Ramsar Site List, and on March 28, 1977 it was included in the list of Wetlands of International Importance. In 1989, the lake and its surroundings were designated as an Important Bird Area.

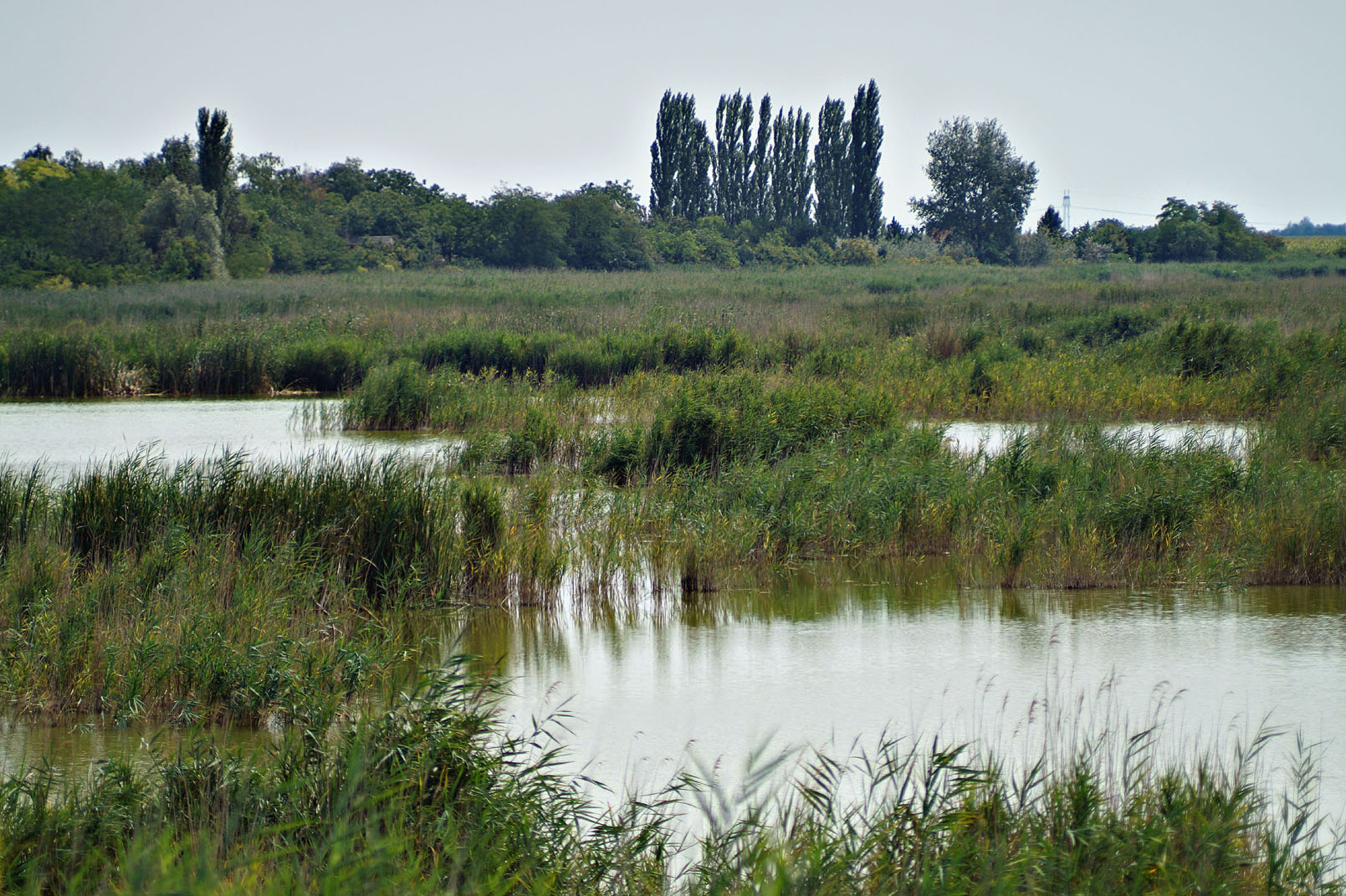
Reed bed along the shore

== See also ==
- List of lakes in Serbia
- Palić Lake
- Kapetanski rit
