= Subotička Peščara =

Sandy dune area in northern Serbia

Coordinates: 46.16°N 19.70°E

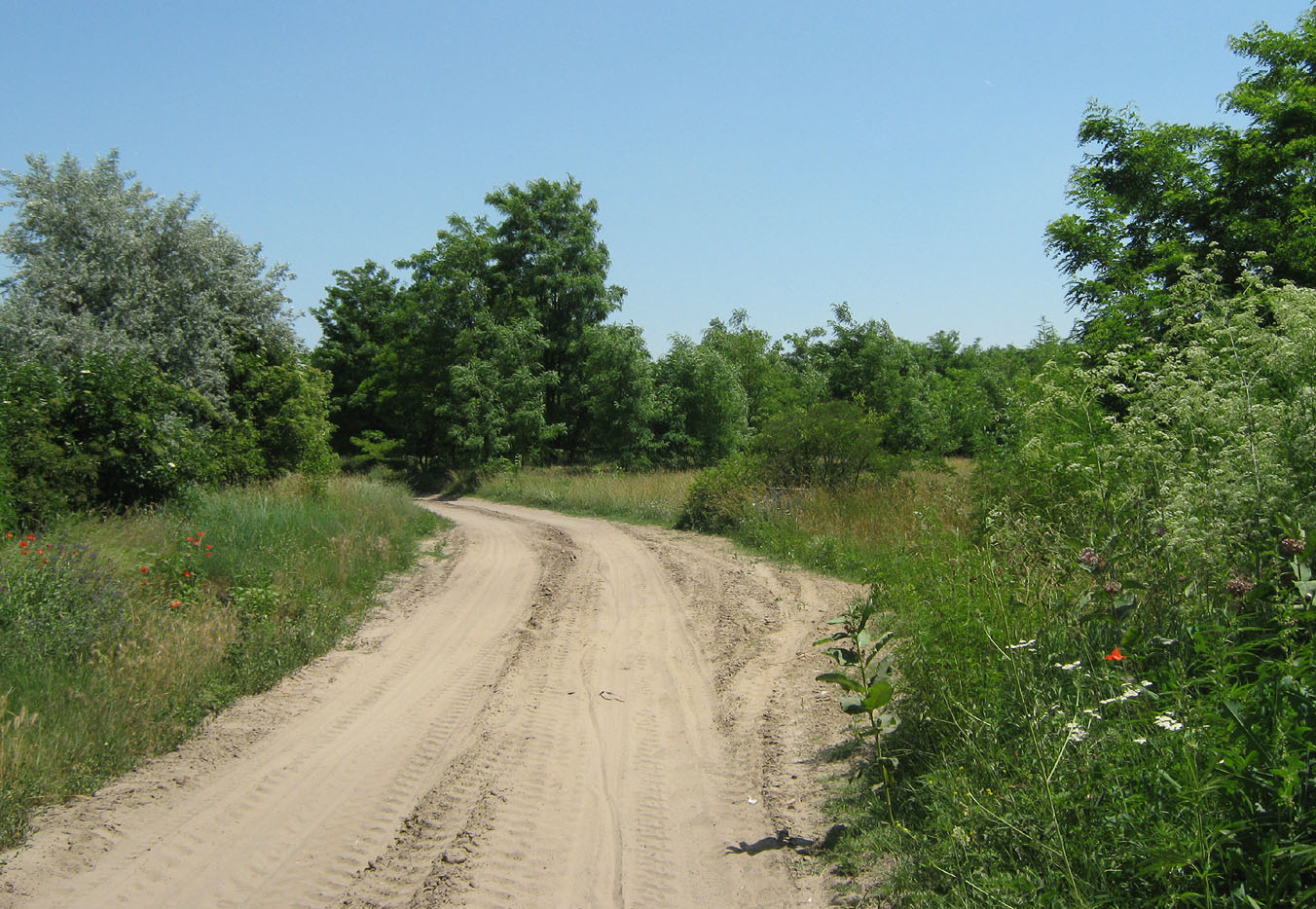
Subotička Peščara

Subotička Peščara (Serbian Cyrillic: Суботичка пешчара) or Subotica Sands is an inland dune habitat located in northern Serbia, along the border with Hungary. The area stretches across the far north of the Bačka region, in the municipality of Subotica. It is protected as a landscape of outstanding features "Subotičko-horgoška peščara", occupying an area of 53.70 km^{2}. Today's undulating sand dunes are a result of the past aeolian activity; the area has been largely forested. The planned forestation of the Subotica Sands began in the late 18th century. Today the habitat constitutes a mix of forest, steppe and wetland. The eastern part of the area is made up of banks of the border river Kereš.

== Biodiversity ==
Traces of primeval vegetation from the Subotica Sands provide valuable testimony to the plant life of the ancient Pannonian Plain. Among the preserved species is the Meadow Saffron which has its only growing spot in Serbia in the Subotica Sands.

A number of rodent species have been recorded in the Subotica Sands, most notably the lesser mole rat. A total of around 170 different bird species have been observed here. This is the reason why the area is part of the international important bird areas conservation programme.

== See also ==
- Deliblatska Peščara
