= Šupljak =

Šupljak Шупљак (Serbian) Ludas (Hungarian)
- Village (Selo)
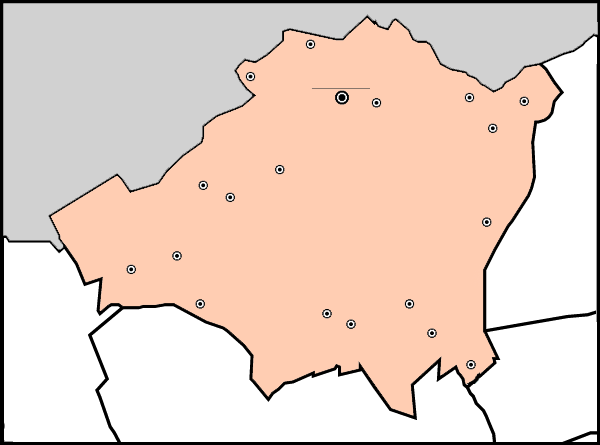

- Location within Vojvodina Location within Serbia Location within Europe
- Country: Serbia
- Province: Vojvodina
- District: North Bačka District
- Municipality: Subotica

Population (2022)
  - Total: 863
- Time zone: UTC+1 (CET)
  - Summer (DST): UTC+2 (CEST)

Šupljak (Serbian Cyrillic: Шупљак, Hungarian: Ludas) is a village in Serbia. It is situated in the Subotica municipality, in the North Bačka District, Vojvodina province. The village has a population of 863 people (2022 census).

== Demographics ==
=== Historical population ===
- 1961: 2,769
- 1971: 2,246
- 1981: 1,650
- 1991: 1,427
- 2002: 1,310
- 2011: 1,115
- 2022: 863

=== Ethnic groups ===
According to data from the 2022 census, ethnic groups in the village include:

- 763 (88.4%) Hungarians
- 28 (3.2%) Bunjevci
- 27 (3.1%) Serbs
- Others/Undeclared/Unknown

== See also ==
- List of places in Serbia
- List of cities, towns and villages in Vojvodina
