= Lake Palić =

Lake in North Bačka District, Serbia

Lake Palić Palićko jezero / Палићко језеро
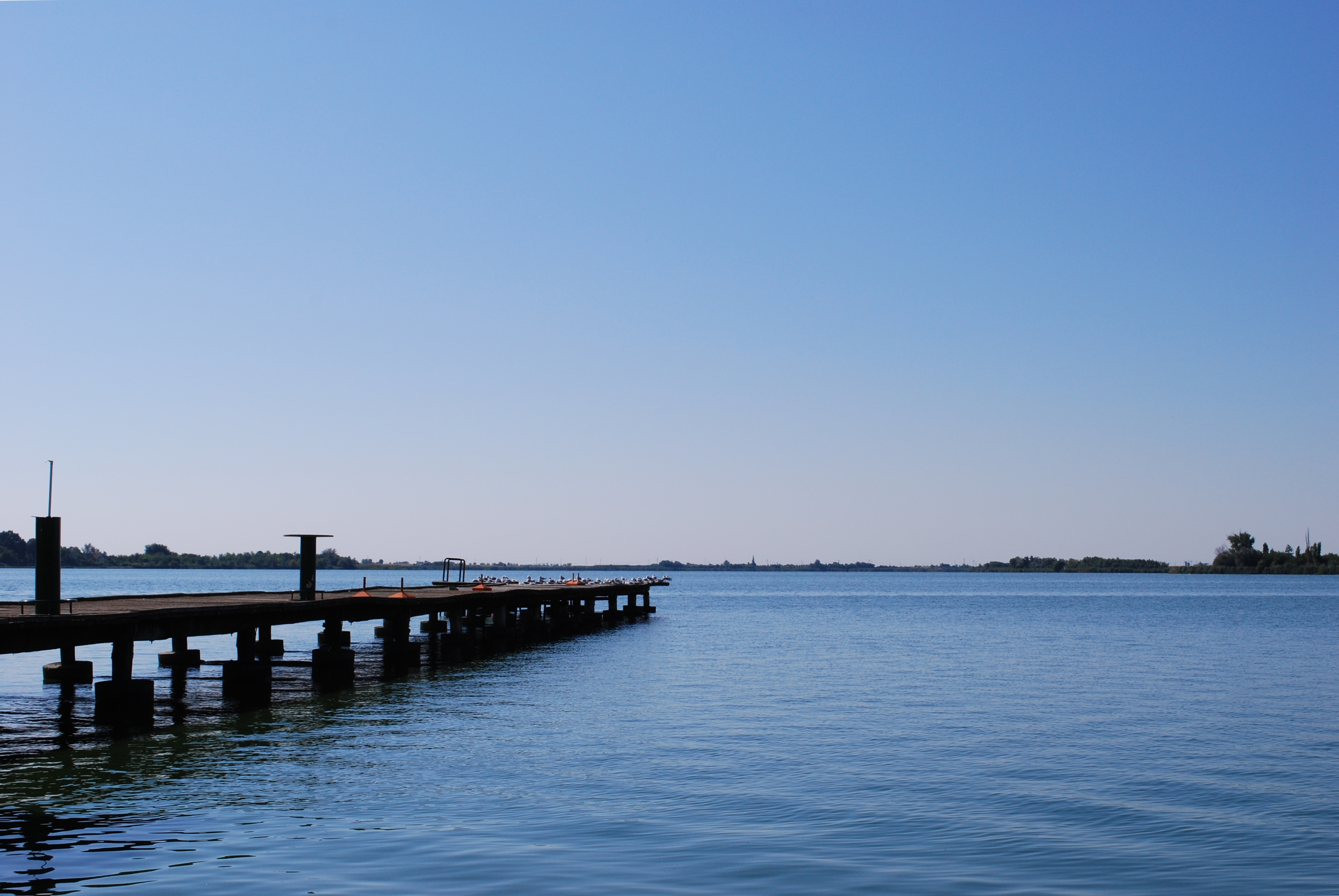

- Location within Serbia
- Coordinates: 46°04′12″N 19°44′51″E
- Basin countries: Serbia
- Max. length: 8 km (26,000 ft)
- Max. width: 1 km (3,300 ft)
- Surface area: 4.2 km^{2} (1.6 sq mi)
- Average depth: 2 m (6.6 ft)
- Max. depth: 3.5 m (11 ft)

Lake Palić (Serbian: Палићко језеро, romanized: Palićko jezero; Hungarian: Palicsi-tó) is a lake 8 kilometres (5.0 mi) from Subotica, near the town of Palić, in Serbia. It covers an area of 3.8 square kilometres (1.5 sq mi). The average depth of the lake is 2 metres (6 ft 7 in). With the surrounding area it forms the protected Nature Park Palić, which covers 7.25 square kilometres (2.80 sq mi).

== Geology ==
Despite popular belief, Lake Palić is not a remnant of the vast Pannonian Sea which covered this area and completely drained out some 600,000 years ago. It is estimated that both the Palić and Ludoš lakes originated in the early Holocene, around 10,000 years ago, when the last major changes in the surrounding terrain occurred. Prior to that, since the draining of the sea, the European climate was much colder, with the exchange of the cold and dry and the warm and wet periods. Alternatively, being frozen and defrosted, the rocks crushed under the ice and crumbled into the dust, which formed sand and loess. The winds would then disperse the loess into the valleys of the Danube and Tisza rivers to the southeast. On the wet grounds, the loess became more compact, becoming thinner and claylike. The surrounding dried land became more and more elevated thus creating the depressions which began to collect water. The process was helped with the erosion which was caused by the water flowing into the depressions. Due to the unstable hydrological regime, the lake constantly disappeared and reappeared through history.

The lake is shallow, with an average depth of 1.5 to 2 m (4 ft 11 in to 6 ft 7 in), while the deepest point is 3.5 m (11 ft). It is 8 km (26,000 ft) long and up to 1 km (3,300 ft) wide. The shoreline is 17 km (11 mi) long.

The idea that the lake was remnant of the sea was influenced by its geographical location (in the bed of the former sea) and the fact that the water in the lake was salty. It is more likely that both lakes and the nearby river of Körös-ér are remnants of the former rivers which spilled over the Pannonian basin. Surveys showed that the loess layers are younger than the alluvial ones, so the lakes can't be remains of the former Danube's flow as the wind would naturally cover them with sand and loess.

== Human history ==
=== Popular local legend ===
The popular local legend of the lake's origin, which also explains the name, says that the shepherd Paul (Pal in Hungarian, Pavle in Serbian) was pasturing his sheep in the area. He had a lamb with the Golden Fleece but the lamb disappeared one day, and the inconsolable Paul cried so much that his tears flooded the pasture and created the salty lake. The lake was then named Paligo Palus in Latin, Palics in Hungarian or Pavlova bara in Serbian.

=== Ancient history ===
The lake was mentioned for the first time in June 1462 when Hungarian king Matthias Corvinus bestowed it to his mother, Queen Mother of Hungary, Erzsébet Szilágyi, as part of the puszta-like Csongrád County. It was mentioned as Palij. In Ottoman inscription from 1580, it was recorded as the village of Palegyhaza in Subotica nahiyah. The writing says the village has 10 houses. and that all pay taxes.

=== Modern history ===
The first, small park along the lake was planted in 1841–1842, in the English style. The Great Park was projected in 1840, in the baroque, English style. In 1845 the first spa bathroom with wooden baths and an inn were built. Data on the quality of the water originate from 1847 when the first chemical analysis was done. The lake became a spa and the water was used for the soda water production. The mud was considered healing. Hot baths were built in 1852–1854, park and hotel Trščara in 1853 and Old Hotel in 1857. Hotel Park was built in 1860, followed by the Little Inn at Ženski Strand in 1885, Hotel Jezero in 1903, and Great Terrace with water tower in 1909–1912. The székely-style gate was built through the water tower, marking entrance into the Great Park and its main alley which extends to the lake itself, the "prestige, Swiss style" Split Alley, built c.1900. All these structures were declared cultural monuments. Also built were the Summer Stage, designed by Baltazar Dulić, Music Pavilion (in 1910), Abacija cinema (in 1925), and Little Inn. After the railway reached Palić in 1869, the lake spa complex became accessible to all parts of Hungary. The train station was built in 1887, the road to the lake was cobblestoned in 1894, and the tram line was established in 1897.

The town of Palić is located on the northern shores of the lake, where in time parks and hotels developed. As it wasn't allowed at the time for men and women to bath together, the Muški Štrand (Male beach) was formed on the east, and Ženski Štrand (Female beach) on the west. They are divided by the small promontory, which is named Ljubavni Rt (Love Cape). On 15 September 1912, a memorial drinking fountain was dedicated in the park. It originally contained lyrics by the poet Dezső Kosztolányi which were later removed, and the originally envisioned lake fairy on top of the fountain was never placed, with jug with flowers being sculptured instead. There is inscription with short history of Palić.

From 1886 to 1889, the swampy banks were arranged, and the semi-circular embankment with a promenade along the lake was built. In 1898, the hydrotherapy sanatorium was opened. The present appears of both town and the lake spa were designed in the 1910s by the architects Marcell Komor and Dezső Jakab in Hungarian Secession style. The complex project included urban and communal arrangement of the park, building and restoration of the edifices, arrangement of the shoreline, etc. At the coast, there is a monument dedicated to Komor and Jakab.

Lake Palić Hungarian Secession buildings

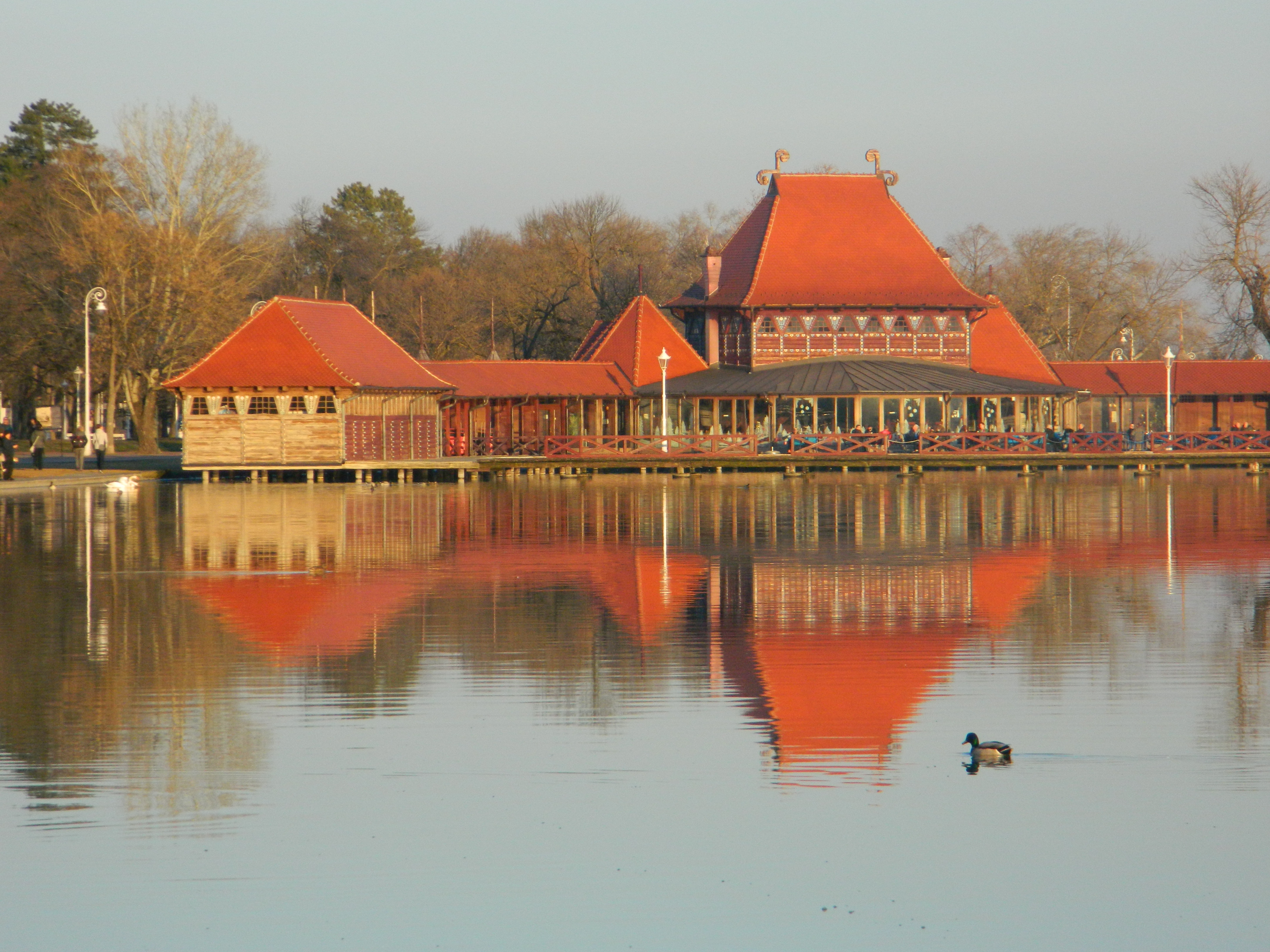
Women's Lido

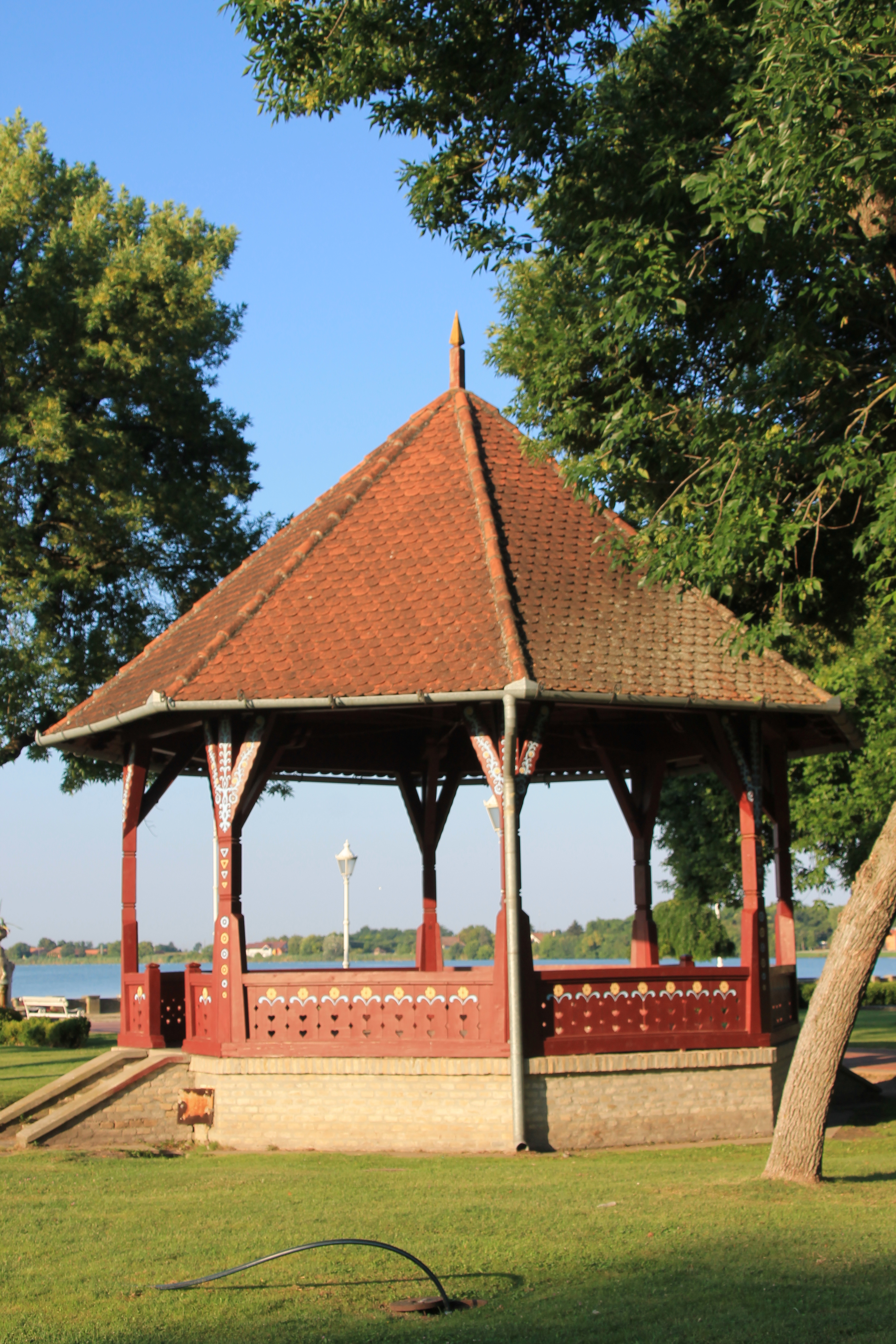
Music pavilion

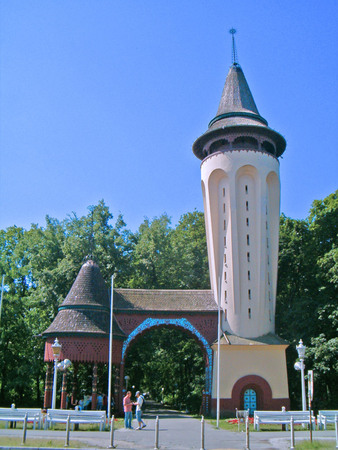
Water tower

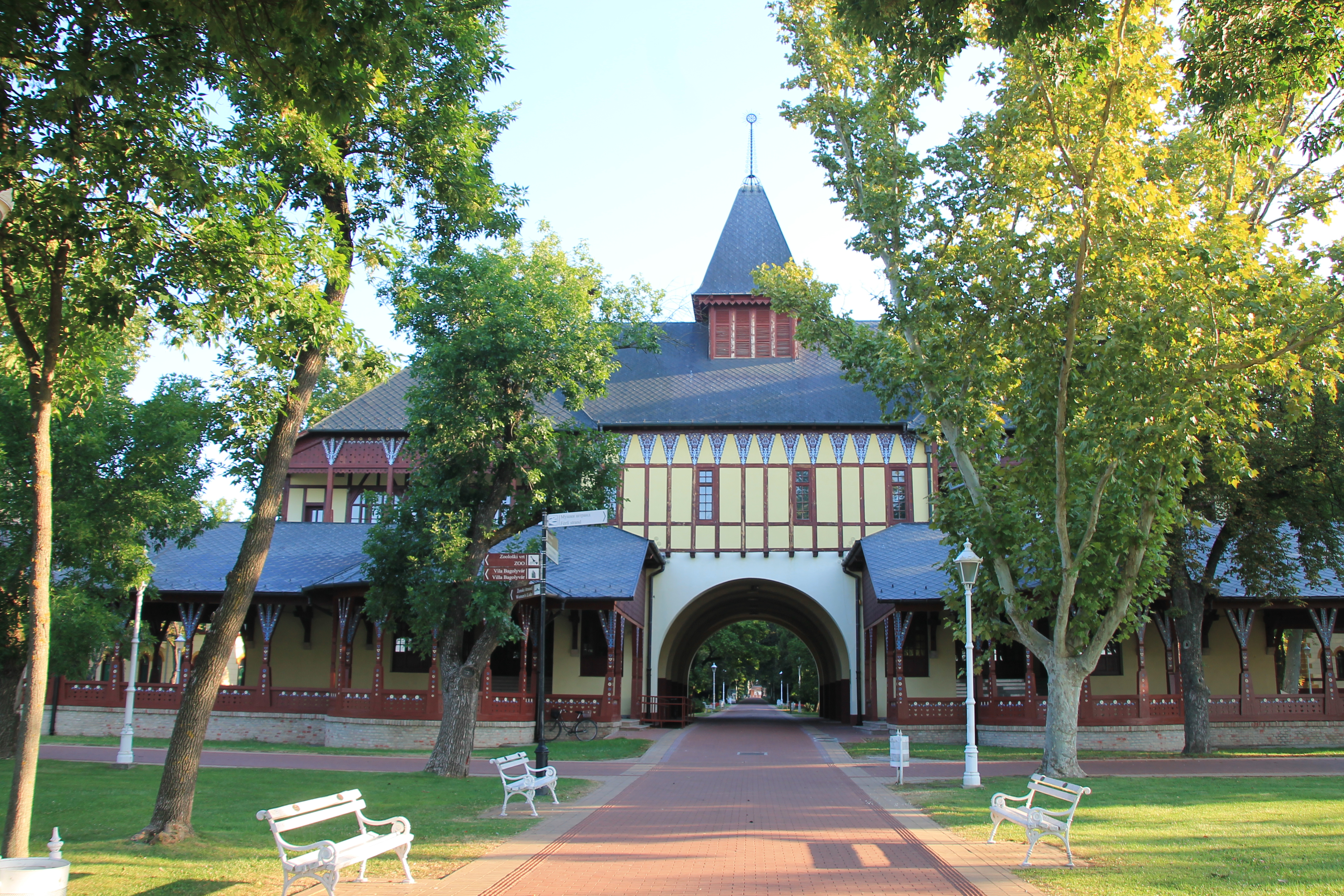
Kursaal

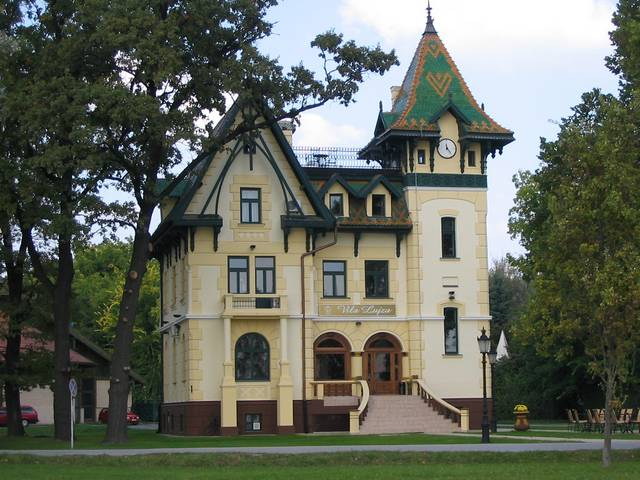
Villa Lujza

From the late 19th and into most of the 20th century, the cyclic development of the overgrowth followed by the fish kill were common. In 1970 the eutrophication reached its peak and almost all the wildlife in the lake died. In 1971 the lake was dried, the sludge was dredged and removed, the filters were placed, and the lake was refilled in 1976, but in the next decades, the lake got polluted again.

After World War II, a settlement made of weekend-houses developed on the eastern shore, south of Muški Štrand. Many houses were built by the state-owned companies which collapsed since the 1990s, so they were left unattended. Known simply as Vikend-Naselje (Weekend-Settlement), but nicknamed Beirut due to its dilapidated appearance, it had 312 houses in 2022, with the total of 380 of houses in the wider area. Demolition began in June 2023, with plans for the new, arranged settlement instead.

In 1936, the Palić weather station became operational. Located at the northeast corner of the lake, it measured the highest temperature on 15 August 1952 (39.6 °C (103.3 °F)), and the lowest on 16 February 1954 (−26.7 °C (−16.1 °F)). The weather station was destroyed in 1999, during the NATO bombing of Yugoslavia, so the new one was built, a bit further to the east.

Since the late 2010s, construction of the pedestrian pathway, which would connect all attractions in the touristic zone along the lake, began. The work was continued in the summer of 2023, after several years of pause. Made of decorative, red bricks, the path will be 3 km (1.9 mi) long.

=== Olympic games ===
Along the lake, the “first modern Olympic games” were held on 26 August 1880, sixteen years before the 1896 Summer Olympics, the first modern Olympics. The games included fencing, running, stone throwing, wrestling and bicycle riding around the lake, which became a traditional event. The games were organized by Lajoš Vermeš, a school friend and a roommate of Pierre de Coubertin, the founder of modern Olympism. Named the "Palić Olympics", the games became international in 1884 when first athletes from Serbia participated, as the lake was part of Austria Hungary at the time.

Starting in 1891, Vermeš invested into the construction of various sports structures and lodging venues, including the elliptic track, 225 m (738 ft) long, with the bleachers, so it was called the Enclosed Arena. He also constructed and paved the bicycle racing track. Investing his own money, Vermeš went bankrupt, and the games were discontinued with the outbreak of the World War I in 1914. Đuro Stantić, who participated in the Palić games, later won a gold medal at 1906 Intercalated Games which were considered a "proper Olympics" at the time.

One of the structures built by Vermeš to accommodate the participants was Villa Bagoljvar, today colloquially called Sovina Kula ("owl tower"). Built as a precursor of the secession style in 1891, it was designed in the Swiss style, with decorative beaver-tail tiles. Referred to as the first Olympic hotel, there is a monument to Vermeš erected next to it.

== Wildlife ==
Over 200 bird species live in the protected section of the lake. During the emptying and refilling of the lake in the 1970s, artificial island made of the dried sludge were formed. They became known as the birds' islands and are today the only nesting location of black-headed gull in Serbia. Surrounding shrubs are habitats of some of the most endangered birds in Serbia, like the migrating pygmy cormorant and razorbill. There are also the usual inhabitants like ducks, swans and herons. In 2023 the otter sightings in the lake were reported.

== Preservation ==
=== Legal protection ===
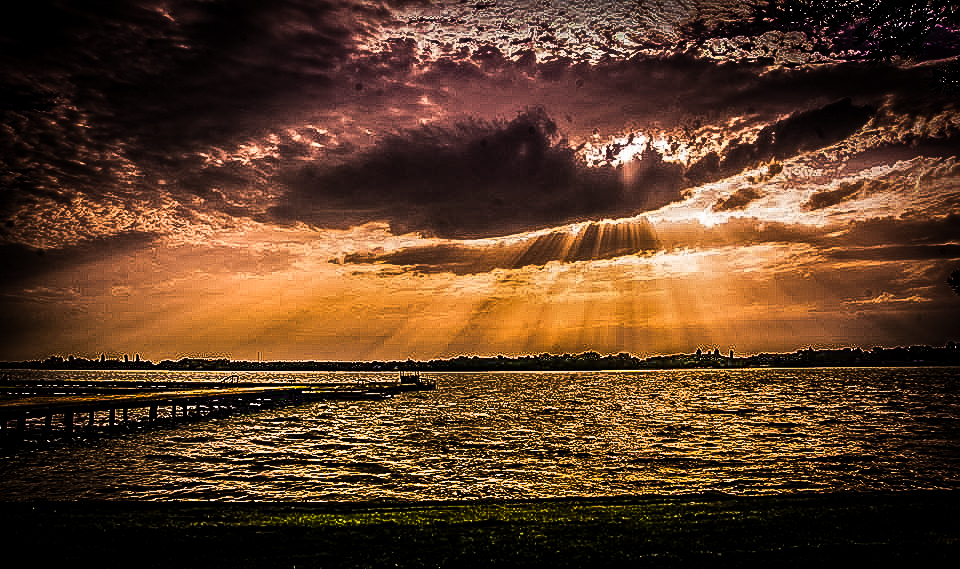
Sunset over the lake

The lake and the surrounding area are placed under the protection as the Nature Park Palić. In August 2022, the protected area was enlarged by 12.35 ha (30.5 acres), to the total of 7.25 km^{2} (2.80 sq mi). The newly formed green belt along the lake was added, while the protection was stripped of the lots in the urbanized touristic zone, where numerous new structures were planned. New addition also includes part of the lake's shoreline, arranged green areas in the central spa area, so as some specific old trees in the park. Being close to the highly urbanized zone (towns of Palić and Subotica), the protective buffer zone which covers 9.86 km^{2} (3.81 sq mi) was declared around the nature park, to prevent "strong anthropogenic influences".

The ecological situation in the lake began to sharply deteriorate in the early 2010s. Only in 2015 a spatial plan was finished, which included the area between the lakes Palić and the neighboring Krvavo Lake, which is divided from Palić by a small embankment. The covered area includes 8.7 ha (21 acres) on which the lots were enlarged in an effort to make it easier for the construction of the future complex (closed and opened swimming pools, aqua park, hotel complex, etc.) All previous plans also include the revitalization of the Palić Spa. Works on improving the lake area include: removal of all sources which pollute the lake with nitrogen and phosphorus, which effectively kills the lake; construction of the sewage system around the lake; creation of the protective 25-metre-wide (82 ft) buffer zone which would prevent the nutrients from the arable land in the vicinity to reach the lake; replacement of the fish species in the lake; tightened regime of the purifying sewage water from Subotica, which still empties into the lake. Some of the experimental works on a small section of the lake which is not opened for tourists showed some success, but as of 2017 everything is still just at the planning stage. Expropriation of the surrounding land is expected to be finished by the end of 2017 which would allow the formation of the buffer zone and the sewage in the town of Palić was to be done by 2018.

The sand filter apparatus (peskolov, "sand catcher") managed to remove enough phosphate from the water to lower it down to below 1 mm/L (0.18 in/imp gal) while the nitrogen level remained a bit above the allowed quantities even though the purifier removed 70% of nitrogen. Still, the pinky foam formed on the lake several times in the 2017-18 period and the results showed that the quality of the water deteriorated. Experts involved in the process of preservation don't have a definite answer why: a long period of previous pollution, weather conditions, draught, several malfunctions of the filter (January–March and August–September 2017), etc. The 2018 tests showed that the major pollutant of the water are fecal bacteria. It is estimated that it will take at least 5 years for the lake to heal. Measurements in July 2022 showed that the water fits the microbiological criteria, but not the physical-chemical and hydrobiological levels as there were still lots of nitrogen, phosphorus and blue-green algae in the water. The water remained unusable for both drinking and swimming.

=== 2019–2022 revitalization ===
In the spring of 2019, it was decided to fish out the Prussian carp, omnivorous and voracious fish, which became abundant in the lake. In several months, over 20 tons of Prussian carp were fished. After the project was done, results showed the first improvement in the quality of the lake water since 1998. Though still categorized as the lowest, fifth category and not suitable for swimming, the water had less ammoniacal and nitrite compounds, and less algae while zooplankton Daphnia, which feeds on phytoplankton, reappeared in the lake. Another problem is the poaching. Apart from the direct damage in reducing number of animals (including the protected European pond turtle), it also affects the natural purification of water. The main catch for the poachers is the zander, which, as a predator, is very important in the lake's food chain. Situation with Prussian carp turned out to be worse than expected: it was estimated that there are 120 tons of this fish in the lake in total, but 190 tons were actually fished out.

Further expropriation needed for the buffer zone was conducted in 2019–2020. The entire surrounding area was already expropriated in 1974, when the lake was emptied. However, the erosion since then eroded the banks, so the privately owned parcels which were further from the lake, are now on its banks. The buffer zone consists of four layers: 1) reed bed, in the water itself, which prevents the erosion of the banks by the waves and forms habitat for the birds; 2) bank slopes, inhabited by the herbaceous plants and habitat for the reptiles; 3) grassy areas, used only by those who administer and watch the protected areas; 4) pedestrian and bicycle path, with benches and stops where possible. In order to create the buffer zone, a monoculture of wild blackberry shrubs which spread all over the lake, had to be eradicated. It was replaced with other plants, mainly alfalfa, which prevent expansion of the invasive herbaceous plants. In February 2020, it was reported that some bird species, previously absent, were spotted at the lake.

Fishing out of Prussian carp showed that small populations of indigenous species survived in the lake, some specimen weighing up to 10 kilograms (22 lb). This prompted the second phase of the biomanipulation of the lake. In December 2021, after 10 years of discontinuation, fish stocking with autochthonous species resumed. Predatory wels catfish was reintroduced first, in order to control the population of invasive Prussian carp. Combined with temporary fish bans, in order to allow for the fish to spawn to greater numbers, and monitoring of the number of fish, future stocking batches will include northern pike, zander, common carp, and later other species. Common reed has also been transplanted in the stocked sections, to provide shelter and spawning areas.

In October 2022, the Serbian-German Prussian carp fishing project "Ekolakus" was officially ended. Over 250 tons were fished out of the lake, though a small population still remained, and it will be fished out intermittently. The fish was used as food for animals in the Palić Zoo. By this time, populations of common carp, common rudd, and zander grew significantly. Pike and zander spread via Krvavo Lake and canals into the Ludaš Lake and further into the channeled Körös-ér river. Restocking of the lake with carp and catfish continued, while disturbed stocking marking prevented restocking with rudd and tench.

The "Ekolakus" project, however, continued till the end of 2022, when the report for the 2019–2022 period was published. A pumping station, 22 km (14 mi) of sewage system, and 5 km (3.1 mi) of delivery lines which push wastewater into the water treatment facility were built. Water was upgraded two classes up, from the V to the III category, which makes it acceptable for recreation. Water in sector I, where purified water is poured into the lake, overtook the water from the touristic sector IV in quality. Waste from 1,500 houses and 1,000 individual septic tanks was directly poured into the Palić-Ludаš canal in 2019. Since then, 682 houses were connected to the Subotica's sewage system, while the wastewater from the canal is conducted into the water treatment facility. Amount of phosphorus in the water was cut in half: from 036 μg/L (0.0025 gr/imp gal) in 2019, to 017 μg/L (0.0012 gr/imp gal) in December 2022. 6,800 seedlings were planted in the buffer zone along the bicycle-pedestrian path along the lake. Instead of expected 50 tons of Prussian carp, a total of 273 tons were fished out of the lake. Still, the report concluded that, despite the progress, it is not realistic to expect that Lake Palić will soon become a clearwater lake, without risk for the swimmers.

In April 2023 it was made public that the farm of the Subotica District Prison was illegally dumping animal waste in the lake. It was overpopulated with pigs and sheep, so the warden Dušan Suvajac ordered digging of the canal, 50 cm (20 in) deep and 15 m (49 ft) long, to conduct the overflow of waste into the lake, instead into the septic tanks. According to the whistleblower and prison guard Đorđe Glušac, the prison's management overpopulated farm animals for their own schemes, and in order to avoid the suspicion of frequent emptying of the septic tanks, they dug a canal. It took a while since he reported this to the ministry of ecology until it was made public as the institutions were just moving the case back and forth. Local authorities refused to comment, but on the very day the case was sent to Subotica the canal was hastily filled and hidden under the bales of hay. Suvajac was sent to retirement in March 2023. In November 2022, an illegal dump right next to the bank was observed. By May 2023 it almost doubled, even though it is on the lot of another public company, Subotica's City communal company.

== Tourism ==
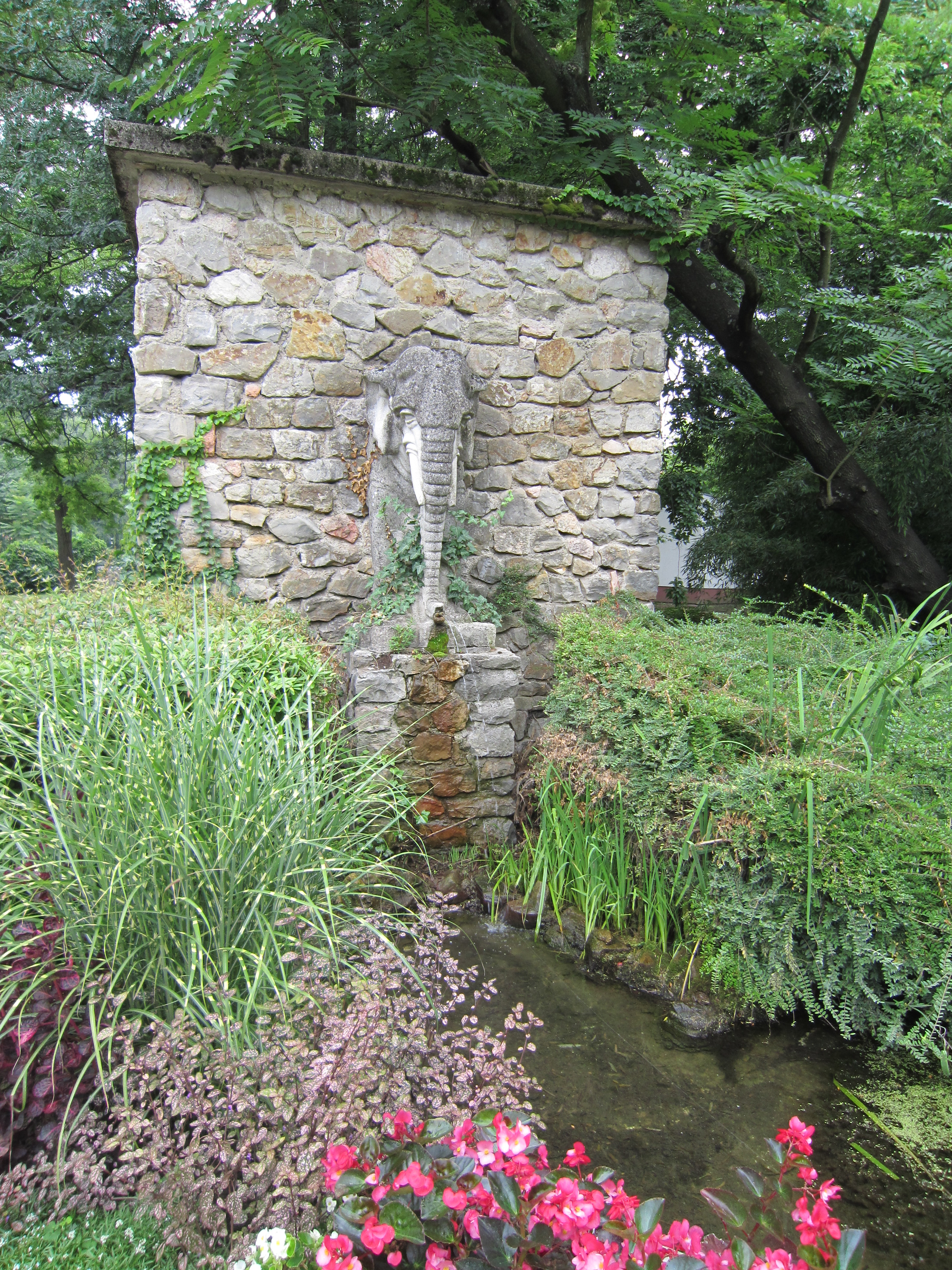
Fountain in Palić Zoo

On 31 May 1950, a small zoo with only three animals (bear, monkey and parrot) was opened above the northwest corner of the lake. By 2020, Palić Zoo grew to 15 ha (37 acres), with 10 ha (25 acres) being available to the visitors, and hundred species with 450 individual specimens. It is known for the vast animal spaces, surrounded by an arboretum with 320 plant species and a nursery garden. Core of the park are several oak trees, planted in the 1710s. The zoo has over 150,000 visitors yearly.

Lake Palić has a relatively short summer season. Influenced by the Hungarian border wellness and spa centers which operate the entire year (Mórahalom, Szeged, Makó, Gyula), the idea of building a wellness complex with the spa was launched in 2006. Master plan for Palić was made in 2007 and the revitalization plan in 2014. Construction of the wellness and spa center began on 15 December 2018. The entire complex will cover an area of 44,000 m^{2} (470,000 sq ft) with 10 swimming pools, water slides and other aqua park attractions. The works stalled so in February 2020 the government stepped inn and changed the contractor giving it deadline of 8 months to finish the works. Despite claims of the local tourist organization that number of tourists grew, the corresponding minister Rasim Ljajić said that the government had to intervene since out of the 18 priority tourist destinations declared by the government, Palić is the only one where number of visitors decreased.

The lake is partially encircled with the 4.5 km (2.8 mi) long pedestrian and bicycle path. Main points of interest, mostly along the northern shore where the town of Palić reaches the lake, include the 19th century Hotel Park, surrounding park made of plane trees planted in the 1910s, former pulmonary sanatorium, luxurious Hotel Jezero, fairy-styled villa Lujza, red-orange castle and the restaurant “Riblja Čarda”, the location of the Vermeš' "Olympic games”. The vicinity of the lake is the location of many vineries, salaš’ adapted for the tourists and the Palić Watertower.

Along the adjoining Krvavo Lake, housing for the participants of the Palić's 1970s Youth work actions was built. In the 1980s the venue housed elementary school pupils and high school students, while in the 1990s it was settled with the refugees from the Yugoslav wars. In 2014, construction of the largest students' resort in Serbia began on this location. It covers an area of 4.5 ha (11 acres), and when completely finished in 2021 it will have a total of 700 beds. The complex also includes sports and conference halls. First visitors were expected in the spring of 2020, but due to the COVID-19 pandemic everything was postponed for March 2021.

As the works on all projects dragged on, local political tensions arose. Local authorities addressed the state government to intervene with the contractors, at the same time announcing construction of the new, luxurious hotel in the same area as the other projects. In June 2022 it was announced that the aqua park will be finished by December 2022, costing almost €14 million in total. This was then prolonged to 31 May, 31 July, and end of August 2023, before the park was finally opened on 15 September 2023.

== See also ==
- Ludoš Lake

== Sources ==
- Seleši, Đ. (2006): Voda Ludaškog jezera, JP „Palić-Ludaš“
- Seleši, Đ (2000): Voda Palićkog jezera od 1781. do 1999. godine
- Treitz, P (1903): A Palicsi tó környékének talajismereti leírasa. - Földtani közlöny, 33. K. 316-321
