= Adorjan, Serbia =

Adorjan Адорјан (Serbian) Adorján (Hungarian)
- Village (Selo)
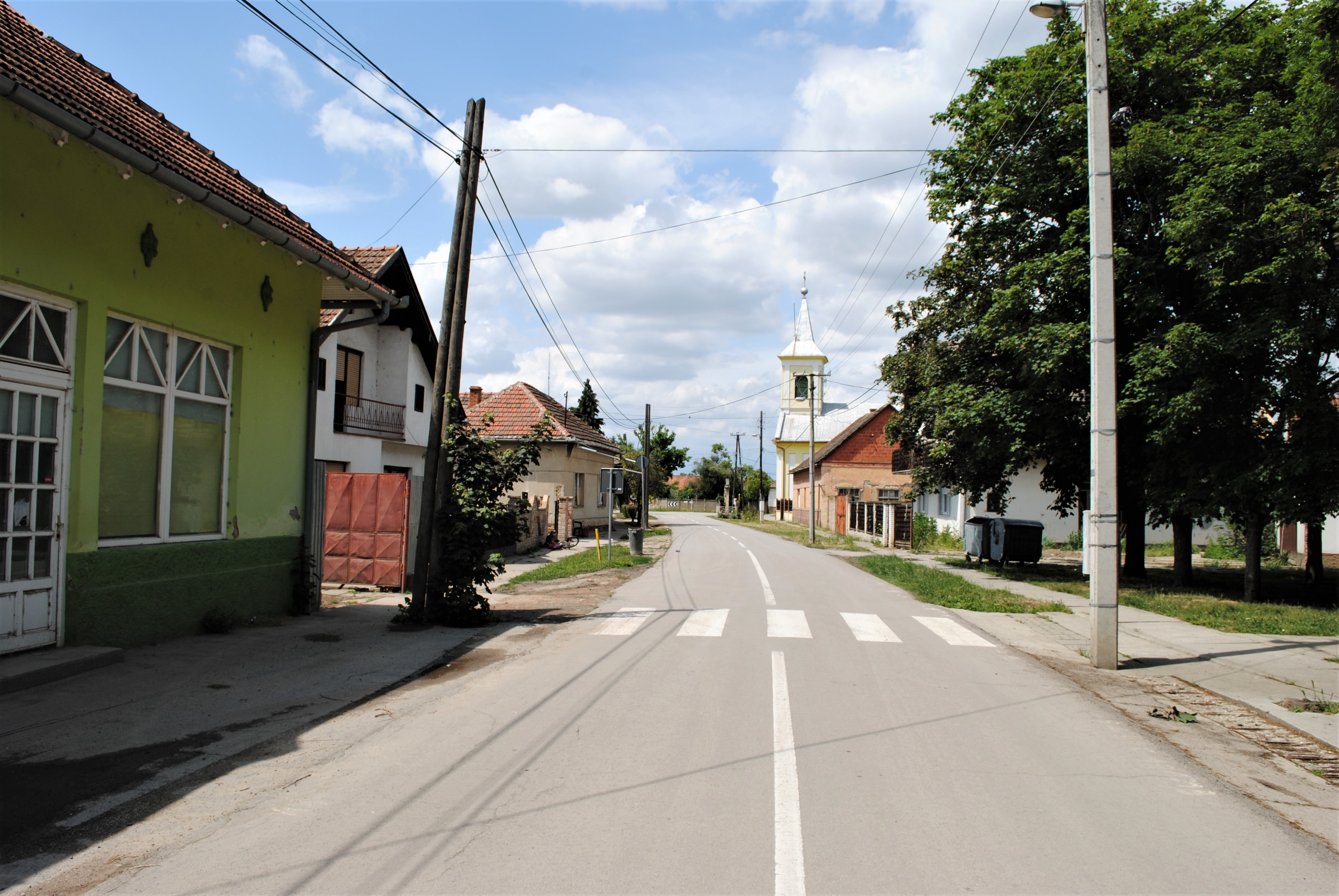
- Main street of the village
- Interactive map of Adorjan
- Location of Adorjan within Serbia Adorjan (Serbia) Adorjan (Europe)
- Coordinates: 45°59′30″N 20°02′15″E
- Country: Serbia
- Province: Vojvodina
- District: North Banat
- Municipalities: Kanjiža
- Elevation: 79 m (259 ft)

Population (2002)
  - Adorjan: 1,128
- Time zone: UTC+1 (CET)
  - Summer (DST): UTC+2 (CEST)
- Postal code: 24425
- Area code: +381(0)24
- Car plates: KA

Adorjan (Serbian Cyrillic: Адорјан, Hungarian: Adorján) is a village in Serbia. It is located in the Kanjiža municipality, in the North Banat District, Vojvodina province. The village has a Hungarian ethnic majority (74.91%) and a population of 1,128 (2002 census).

== See also ==
- List of places in Serbia
- List of cities, towns and villages in Vojvodina
