= State Road 105 (Serbia) =

IIA-class road in northern Serbia

State Road 105
- Serbian: Državni put II reda 105; Serbian Cyrillic: Државни пут II реда 105
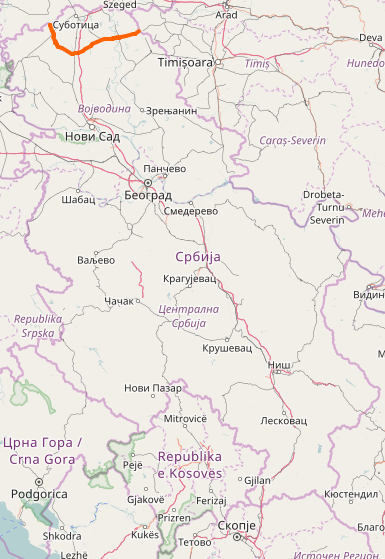

Route information
- Maintained by JP "Putevi Srbije"
- Length: 100.506 km (62.452 mi)

Major junctions
- From: Hungary – Serbia border at Bajmok, Road 5312
- To: Serbia – Romania border at Vrbica, Road DJ682B

Location
- Country: Serbia
- Districts: North Bačka, North Banat

Highway system
- Roads in Serbia; Motorways
← 104	→ 106

State Road 105, is an IIA-class road in northern Serbia, connecting Hungary at Bajmok with Romania at Vrbica. It is located in Vojvodina.

Before the new road categorization regulation given in 2013, the route wore the following names: P 108, M 22.1, P 119, M 24, and P 112 (before 2012) / 103, 102, 120, 101, 11 and 100 (after 2012).

The existing route is a regional road with two traffic lanes. By the valid Space Plan of Republic of Serbia the road is not planned for upgrading to main road, and is expected to be conditioned in its current state.

== Sections ==
Section number	Length (km)	Distance (km)	Section name
10501	8.535 km (5.303 mi)	8.535 km (5.303 mi)	Hungary – Serbia border (Bajmok) – Bajmok
10502	18.606 km (11.561 mi)	27.141 km (16.865 mi)	Bajmok – Bački Sokolac
10503	8.274 km (5.141 mi)	35.415 km (22.006 mi)	Bački Sokolac – Bačka Topola (Kula)
10504	0.389 km (0.242 mi)	35.804 km (22.248 mi)	Bačka Topola (Kula) – Bačka Topola (Bački Sokolac)
10008	0.752 km (0.467 mi)	36.556 km (22.715 mi)	Bačka Topola (Bački Sokolac) – Bačka Topola (Tornjoš) (overlap with)
10505	1.146 km (0.712 mi)	37.702 km (23.427 mi)	Bačka Topola (Tornjoš) – Bačka Topola (Bečej)
10506	4.343 km (2.699 mi)	42.045 km (26.126 mi)	Bačka Topola (Bečej) – Bačka Topola interchange
10507	13.042 km (8.104 mi)	55.087 km (34.229 mi)	Bačka Topola interchange – Tornjoš
10508	15.852 km (9.850 mi)	70.939 km (44.079 mi)	Tornjoš – Gornji Breg (Novo Orahovo)
10204	3.635 km (2.259 mi)	74.574 km (46.338 mi)	Gornji Breg (Novo Orahovo) – Senta (Subotica road) (overlap with)
10509	6.557 km (4.074 mi)	81.131 km (50.412 mi)	Senta (Subotica road) – Čoka (Senta)
01306	0.377 km (0.234 mi)	81.508 km (50.647 mi)	Čoka (Senta) – Čoka (Crna Bara) (overlap with)
10510	12.329 km (7.661 mi)	93.837 km (58.308 mi)	Čoka (Crna Bara) – Crna Bara
10403	2.216 km (1.377 mi)	96.053 km (59.685 mi)	Crna Bara – Crna Bara (Mokrin) (overlap with)
10511	4.453 km (2.767 mi)	100.506 km (62.452 mi)	Crna Bara (Mokrin) – Serbia-Romania border (Vrbica)

== See also ==
- Roads in Serbia
