= State Road 106 (Serbia) =

Road in northern Serbia

State Road 106
- Serbian: Državni put II reda 106; Serbian Cyrillic: Државни пут II реда 106
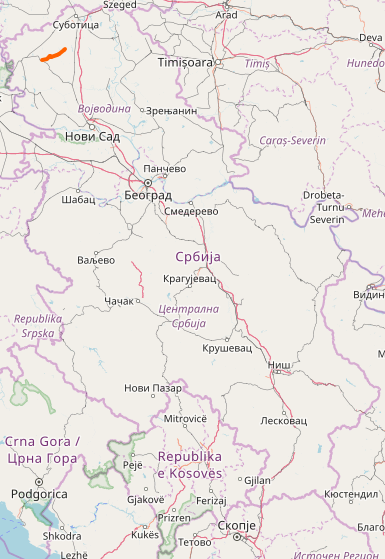

Route information
- Maintained by JP "Putevi Srbije"
- Length: 23.119 km (14.365 mi)

Major junctions
- From: Kljajićevo
- To: Bački Sokolac

Location
- Country: Serbia
- Districts: West Bačka, North Bačka

Highway system
- Roads in Serbia; Motorways
← 105	→ 107

State Road 106, is an IIA-class road in northern Serbia, connecting Kljajićevo with Bački Sokolac. It is located in Vojvodina.

Before the new road categorization regulation given in 2013, the route wore the following names: P 105 (before 2012) / 122 (after 2012).

The existing route is a regional road with two traffic lanes. By the valid Space Plan of Republic of Serbia the road is not planned for upgrading to main road, and is expected to be conditioned in its current state.

== Sections ==
Section number	Length	Distance	Section name
10601	23.119 km (14.365 mi)	23.119 km (14.365 mi)	Kljajićevo (Bački Sokolac) – Bački Sokolac

== See also ==
- Roads in Serbia
