= Crveno Selo =

Coordinates: 46°04′38″N 19°37′41″E

Crveno Selo Црвено село
- Neighborhood
- Interactive map of Crveno Selo
- Country: Serbia
- Province: Vojvodina
- District: North Bačka
- City: Subotica
- Time zone: UTC+1 (CET)
  - Summer (DST): UTC+2 (CEST)

Crveno Selo (Serbian Cyrillic: Црвено село) is a neighborhood of the Mali Bajmok district of Subotica in Serbia. It is populated largely by the Bunjevac minority, and has population of approximately 650.
