= Sándor Mátyás =

Hungarian footballer

Personal information
- Date of birth: 21 March 1973 (age 53)
- Place of birth: Senta, SFR Yugoslavia
- Height: 1.83 m (6 ft 0 in)
- Position: Midfielder

Senior career*
| Years | Team | Apps | (Gls) |
| 1992–1995 | Spartak Subotica | 13 | (0) |
| 1995–1998 | Békéscsaba | 48 | (0) |
- * Club domestic league appearances and goals

Sándor Mátyás (Serbian: Шaндop Maћaш, Šandor Maćaš; born 21 March 1973) is a retired Hungarian professional football midfielder.

Born in Senta, SR Serbia, Yugoslavia, during his career he played for Spartak Subotica, first in the Yugoslav First League, and since 1992 in the First League of FR Yugoslavia. In 1995, he moved to Hungary where he signed with Békéscsaba.
