= Gornji Breg =

Gornji Breg may refer to:

- Gornji Breg (region), a small geographical region in north-eastern Bačka, Vojvodina, Serbia
- Gornji Breg, Senta, a village in Senta municipality, Vojvodina, Serbia
