= Attila Juhász =

Attila Juhász may refer to:

- Attila Juhász (born 1967), Serbian politician, member of the Alliance of Vojvodina Hungarians
- Attila Juhász (born 1976), Serbian politician, member of the Alliance of Vojvodina Hungarians
