= Kevi (disambiguation) =

Kevi is a village in Serbia.

Kevi may also refer to:

- Steven Kevi (born 1968), Papua New Guinean Olympic boxer
- Kevi Luper (born 1990), American women's college basketball player
- Kevi, the lead singer of rap group 1000 Clowns
- KEVI, a member of American music trio Cheat Codes
- The King Edward VI School, Morpeth (KEVI), a school in Morpeth Northumberland
- Quévy (kevi), a municipality of Wallonia in the province of Hainaut, Belgium
- a branch of the Banuchi Pashtun/Afghan tribe
