= Hajnalka Burány =

Serbian politician

Hajnalka Burány (Serbian: Хајналка Бурањ, romanized: Hajnalka Buranj; born 30 March 1980) is a Serbian politician from the country's Hungarian community. She has been the mayor of Senta since July 2024 and previously served in the Vojvodina provincial assembly on an almost uninterrupted basis from 2020 to 2024. Burány is a member of the Alliance of Vojvodina Hungarians (VMSZ).

== Early life and career ==
Burány was born in Senta, in what was then the Socialist Autonomous Province of Vojvodina in the Socialist Republic of Serbia, Socialist Federal Republic of Yugoslavia. She graduated from the University of Novi Sad's department of Hungarian language and literature, after which she returned to Senta to work as a Hungarian language teacher. She later passed the state exam for civil servants and worked as a registrar.

== Politician ==
=== Early years ===
Burány joined the VMSZ in 2012 and was president of its women's forum in Senta. She appeared in the sixtieth position on the party's electoral list in the 2014 Serbian parliamentary election. Election from this position was not a realistic prospect, and she was not elected when the list won six seats.

She appeared in the ninth position on the VMSZ's list for Senta in the 2016 Serbian local elections and was elected when the list won a plurality victory with eleven out of twenty-nine seats. The VMSZ formed a coalition government with the Serbian Progressive Party (SNS) after the election, and Burány served as part of its assembly majority. (Note: Burány's party biography indicates that she stood down from the local assembly in 2018, but this seems to be an error: there is no indication in Senta's official gazette that she left the assembly, and the municipality's website listed her as an assembly member until the end of the 2016–20 term.) She was promoted to the fourth position on the VMSZ's list for Senta in the 2020 local elections and was re-elected when the list won thirteen seats. She resigned from the local assembly on 21 August 2020.

Burány became the president of the VMSZ's women's forum in October 2019.

=== Provincial assembly member ===
Burány received the ninth position the VMSZ's electoral list in the 2020 Vojvodina provincial election and was elected when the list won eleven seats. The SNS and its allies won a majority victory and afterward formed a new coalition government that included the VMSZ. In her first term, Burány was a member of the committee for culture and public information and the committee for gender equality.

The Vojvodina assembly was dissolved in November 2023 to permit an early provincial election in December of that year. Burány was promoted to the third position on the VMSZ's list and was re-elected when the list won nine seats. In her second term, she was a member of the committee for science and education.

=== Mayor of Senta ===
Burány led the VMSZ's list for Senta in the 2024 Serbian local elections and was re-elected when the list won fourteen seats. The VMSZ continued its alliance with the SNS after the election, and Burány was chosen as the municipality's new mayor on 10 July 2024. By virtue of holding this position, she was required to resign from the provincial assembly, which she did on 18 July.
