= Bogaraš (Senta) =

Bogaraš Богараш (Serbian) Bogaras (Hungarian)
- Village (Selo)
- Location of Vojvoda Zimonić within Serbia Bogaraš (Serbia) Bogaraš (Europe)
- Coordinates: 45°56′02″N 19°55′23″E
- Country: Serbia
- Province: Vojvodina
- District: North Banat
- Municipalities: Senta
- Elevation: 110 m (360 ft)

Population (2022)
  - Bogaraš: 436
- Time zone: UTC+1 (CET)
  - Summer (DST): UTC+2 (CEST)
- Postal code: 24408
- Area code: +381(0)24
- Car plates: SA

Bogaraš (Serbian Cyrillic: Богараш, Hungarian: Bogaras or Karjad-Gádorfalu) is a village in Serbia. It is situated in the Senta municipality, in the North Banat District, Vojvodina province. The village has a Hungarian ethnic majority (80.11%) with a present Romani minority (12.43%) and its population numbering 436 people (2022 census).

== See also ==
- List of places in Serbia
- List of cities, towns and villages in Vojvodina
