= State Road 107 (Serbia) =

Road in northern Serbia

State Road 107
- Serbian: Državni put II reda 107; Serbian Cyrillic: Државни пут II реда 107
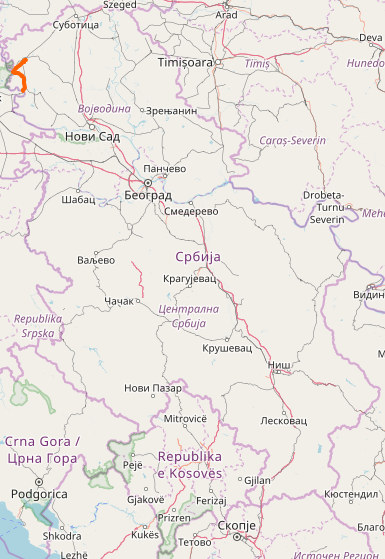

Route information
- Maintained by JP "Putevi Srbije"
- Length: 37.662 km (23.402 mi)

Major junctions
- From: Sombor
- To: Bogojevo

Location
- Country: Serbia
- Districts: West Bačka

Highway system
- Roads in Serbia; Motorways
← 106	→ 108

State Road 107, is an IIA-class road in northern Serbia, connecting Sombor with Bogojevo. It is located in Vojvodina.

Before the new road categorization regulation given in 2013, the route wore the following names: P 101 (before 2012) / 19 (after 2012).

The existing route is a regional road with two traffic lanes. By the valid Space Plan of Republic of Serbia the road is not planned for upgrading to main road, and is expected to be conditioned in its current state.

== Sections ==
Section number	Length	Distance	Section name
10701	37.662 km (23.402 mi)	37.662 km (23.402 mi)	Sombor (Apatin) – Bogojevo (Apatin)

== See also ==
- Roads in Serbia
