= Vrbica, Čoka =

Village in Vojvodina, Serbia

Vrbica Врбица (Serbian) Egyházaskér (Hungarian) Verbița (Romanian)
- Village (Selo)
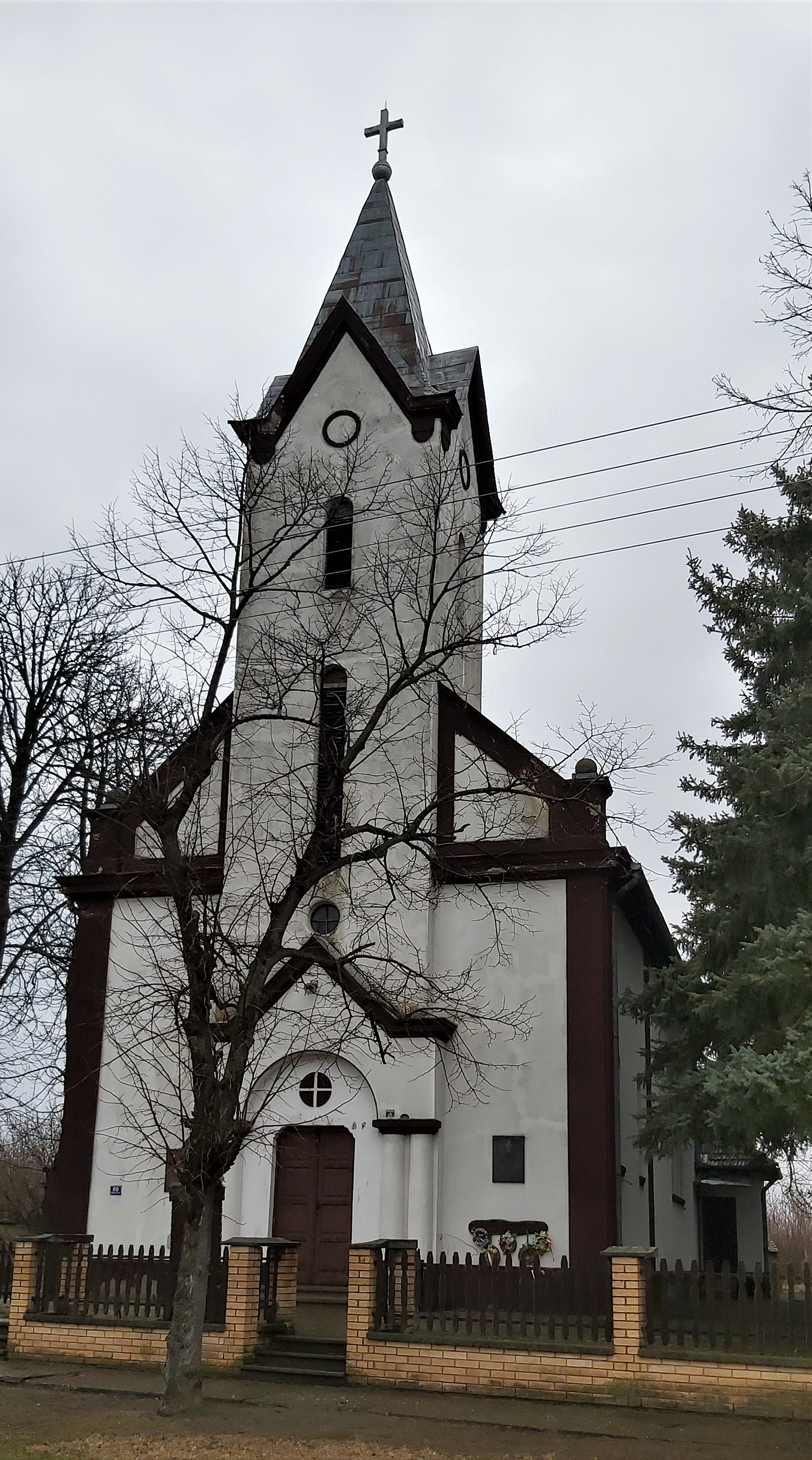
- The Birth of St. John the Baptist Catholic Church

- Location of Vrbica within Serbia Vrbica (Serbia) Vrbica (Europe)
- Coordinates: 46°00′24″N 20°18′28″E
- Country: Serbia
- Province: Vojvodina
- Region: Banat
- District: North Banat
- Municipality: Čoka
- Elevation: 69 m (226 ft)

Population (2011)
  - Vrbica: 404
- Time zone: UTC+1 (CET)
  - Summer (DST): UTC+2 (CEST)
- Postal code: 23329
- Area code: +381(0)230
- Car plates: KI

Vrbica (Serbian Cyrillic: Врбица, Hungarian: Egyházaskér, Romanian: Verbița) is a village in Serbia. It is situated in the Čoka municipality, North Banat District, Vojvodina province. The village has a Hungarian ethnic majority (92.07%) and its population according to the 2002 census numbering 404 people.

== Historical population ==
- 1961: 1,220
- 1971: 988
- 1981: 654
- 1991: 548
- 2002: 404

== See also ==
- List of places in Serbia
- List of cities, towns and villages in Vojvodina
