= Bački Sokolac =

Bački Sokolac Бачки Соколац (Serbian)
- Village (Selo)
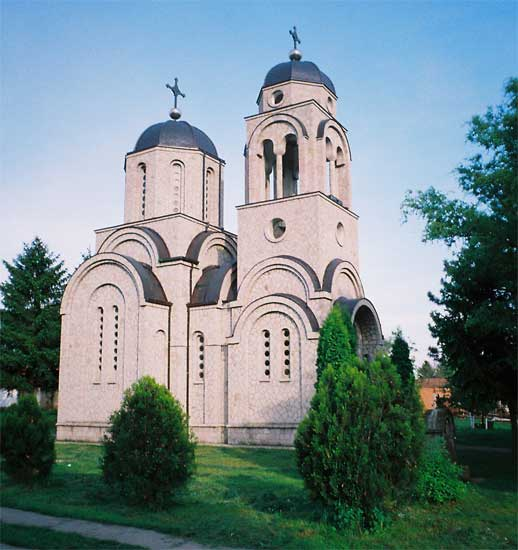
- Serbian Orthodox church

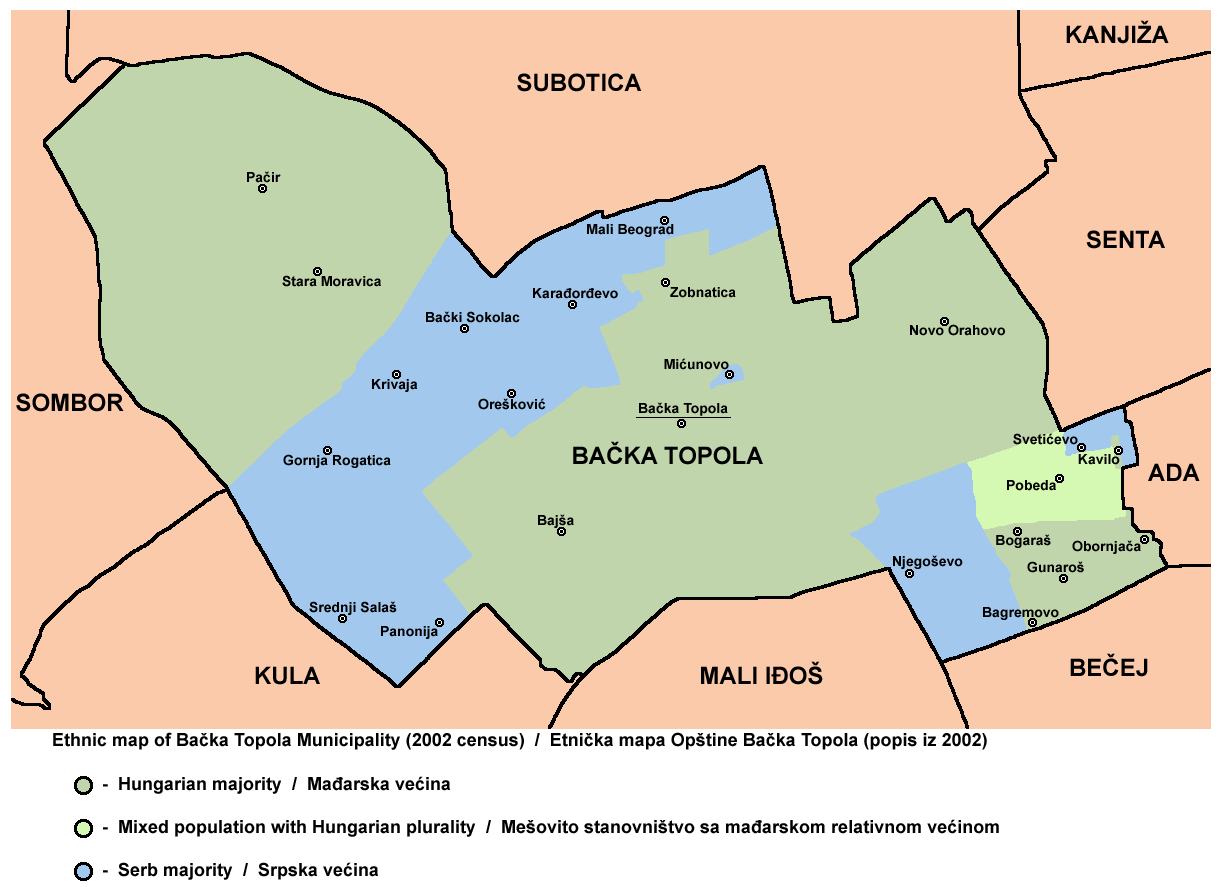
- Map of the Bačka Topola municipality showing the location of Bački Sokolac

- Location within Vojvodina Location within Serbia Location within Europe
- Coordinates: 45°51′N 19°32′E
- Country: Serbia
- Province: Vojvodina
- District: North Bačka District
- Municipality: Bačka Topola

Population (2002)
  - Total: 609
- Time zone: UTC+1 (CET)
  - Summer (DST): UTC+2 (CEST)

Bački Sokolac (Serbian Cyrillic: Бачки Соколац, Hungarian: Bácsandrásszállás) is a village in Serbia. It is situated in the Bačka Topola municipality, in the North Bačka District, Vojvodina province. The village has a Serb ethnic majority and its population numbering 609 people (2002 census).

== Historical population ==
- 1961: 1,051
- 1971: 1,108
- 1981: 525
- 1991: 497
- 2002: 609

== See also ==
- List of places in Serbia
- List of cities, towns and villages in Vojvodina
