= Tornjoš =

Tornjoš Торњош (Serbian) Tornyos (Hungarian)
- Village (Selo)
- Location of Vojvoda Zimonić within Serbia Tornjoš (Serbia) Tornjoš (Europe)
- Coordinates: 45°52′25″N 19°49′32″E
- Country: Serbia
- Province: Vojvodina
- District: North Banat
- Municipalities: Senta
- Elevation: 114 m (374 ft)

Population (2002)
  - Tornjoš: 1,766
- Time zone: UTC+1 (CET)
  - Summer (DST): UTC+2 (CEST)
- Postal code: 24352
- Area code: +381(0)24
- Car plates: SA

Tornjoš (in Serbian Cyrillic: Торњош, in Hungarian: Tornyos) is a village in Serbia. It is situated in the Senta municipality, in the North Banat District, Vojvodina province. The village has a Hungarian ethnic majority (82.21%) with a present Romani minority (14.49%) and its population numbers 1,766 people (2002 census).

== See also ==
- List of places in Serbia
- List of cities, towns and villages in Vojvodina
