= Kevi =

Kevi Кеви (Serbian) Kevi (Hungarian)
- Village (Selo)
- Location of Vojvoda Zimonić within Serbia Kevi (Serbia) Kevi (Europe)
- Coordinates: 45°51′01″N 19°52′29″E
- Country: Serbia
- Province: Vojvodina
- District: North Banat
- Municipalities: Senta
- Elevation: 113 m (371 ft)

Population (2022)
  - Kevi: 565
- Time zone: UTC+1 (CET)
  - Summer (DST): UTC+2 (CEST)
- Postal code: 24407
- Area code: +381(0)24
- Car plates: SA

Kevi (in Serbian: Кеви or Kevi, in Hungarian: Kevi) is a village in Serbia. It is situated in the Senta municipality, in the North Banat District, Vojvodina province. The village has a Hungarian ethnic majority (96.95%) and its population numbering 565 people (2022 census).

== See also ==
- List of places in Serbia
- List of cities, towns and villages in Vojvodina
