= Attila Juhász (born 1967) =

Hungarian politician

Attila Juhász (Serbian: Атила Јухас, Atila Juhas) (born July 15, 1967 in Senta, SAP Vojvodina, SR Serbia, SFR Yugoslavia) is an ethnic Hungarian politician in Serbia. He was the president of Senta municipality as a member of Alliance of Vojvodina Hungarians (VMSZ).

He graduated in 1996 from the University of Novi Sad as a teacher of Hungarian language and literature. He worked for the Radio Novi Sad and contributed to the Napló newspaper. He was the mayor of Senta from 1997 to 2008, and he served in the Serbian parliament in the 2001–04 term.

== Personal life ==
His parents are Ferencz Juhász and Mária Kurin. He is married. His wife is Kornélia Juhász Lassu. They have two daughters, Boglárka and Orsolya.
