= Gornji Breg (Senta) =

Gornji Breg Горњи Брег (Serbian) Felsőhegy (Hungarian)
- Village (Selo)
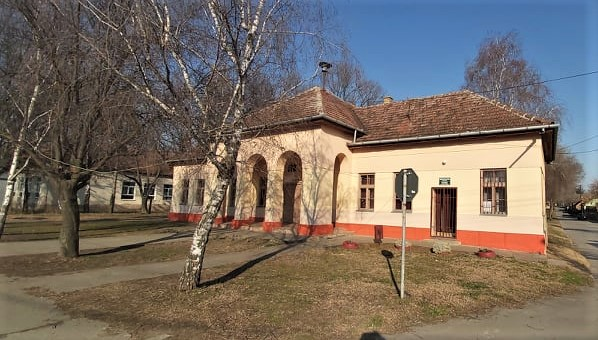
- Cultural center

- Location of Vojvoda Zimonić within Serbia Gornji Breg (Serbia) Gornji Breg (Europe)
- Coordinates: 45°55′05″N 20°00′00″E
- Country: Serbia
- Province: Vojvodina
- District: North Banat
- Municipalities: Senta
- Elevation: 87 m (285 ft)

Population (2002)
  - Gornji Breg: 1,889
- Time zone: UTC+1 (CET)
  - Summer (DST): UTC+2 (CEST)
- Postal code: 24406
- Area code: +381(0)24
- Car plates: SA

Gornji Breg (Serbian Cyrillic: Горњи Брег, Hungarian: Felsőhegy) is a village in Serbia situated in the Senta municipality, in the North Banat District; province: Vojvodina which is 5 km (3.1 mi) west of the Tisa river. The village has a Hungarian ethnic majority and a population of about 1,889 people (2002 census). The number of inhabitants is constantly decreasing.

The village and railway station, named Hódmezővásárhelykutasipuszta, were used for filming the 1955 film: I Often Think of Piroschka (Ich denke oft an Piroschka) starring Liselotte Pulver and Gunnar Möller.

== Geography ==
It is located on the right bank of the River Tisa in northern Bačka. It lies 4 kilometers west of the town of Senta and about 7 kilometers from the river on the Senta—Subotica railway.

== History ==
The oldest reliable information about the village dates from 1738, when it was under Austrian rule, being administratively part of the Military Frontier. The local church was built in 1890. During the 1960s and 1970s, the village was urbanized and a nursery school was built.

It is one of the newer settlements in the region since the space where this village was located was abandoned for a long time after Ottoman rule had ended. The Hungarian population that settled here came from Dorozsma, and Felsőmegye, which are located in modern-day Hungary. The first settlers had planted the hills with grapes and fruit trees, hence they named it Felsőszőlőhegy. After the desolation of grapes, the name of the settlement was shortened into Felsőhegy.

== Economy ==
The main occupation of the resident population is agriculture. The majority deals with vegetables and market gardening as well as glasshouse culture.

== Culture and events ==
The local church is dedicated to Saint Joseph, and a high mass is organized every May to celebrate the aforementioned saint. Besides the church's feast day, there is an annual fair throughout the village, which also attracts the surrounding towns and villages. There is a primary school “Csokonai Vitéz Mihály” across the church. Near the school, there is a community center, where different programs and ceremonies are held every year.

Every year, the village organizes a harvesting festival. There are many different sporting events during the day, and when the evening comes, there is a "Harvester’s Ball". The other festival is the "Shearer Festival". This event includes a cooking contest where you can taste the lamb stew, which gathers a lot of attention.

== Demographics ==
According to the last census, it has 1,889 inhabitants. 97,14% of the population is of Hungarian nationality, 1,27% have Serbian nationality, and 1,59% of the population claim they have other nationalities. It is mostly an ethnic Hungarian village and all of the population speaks the Hungarian language fluently. Gornji Breg has 1,497 adult citizens. The average age of the inhabitants is approximately 40 years. The village has 739 households with an average of 2,56 members per house.

== Other village characteristics ==
There's a park behind the school where you can find a playground which was built several years ago. Besides these, there is a sanitary office, three shops, two bakeries a nice mill and two agricultural co-operations. There is not much to see in the village, since there are no official sights.

== See also ==
- List of places in Serbia
- List of cities, towns and villages in Vojvodina
- Official website of Senta
