= Senta =

Senta Сента (Serbian) Zenta (Hungarian) Senta colony
- Town and municipality
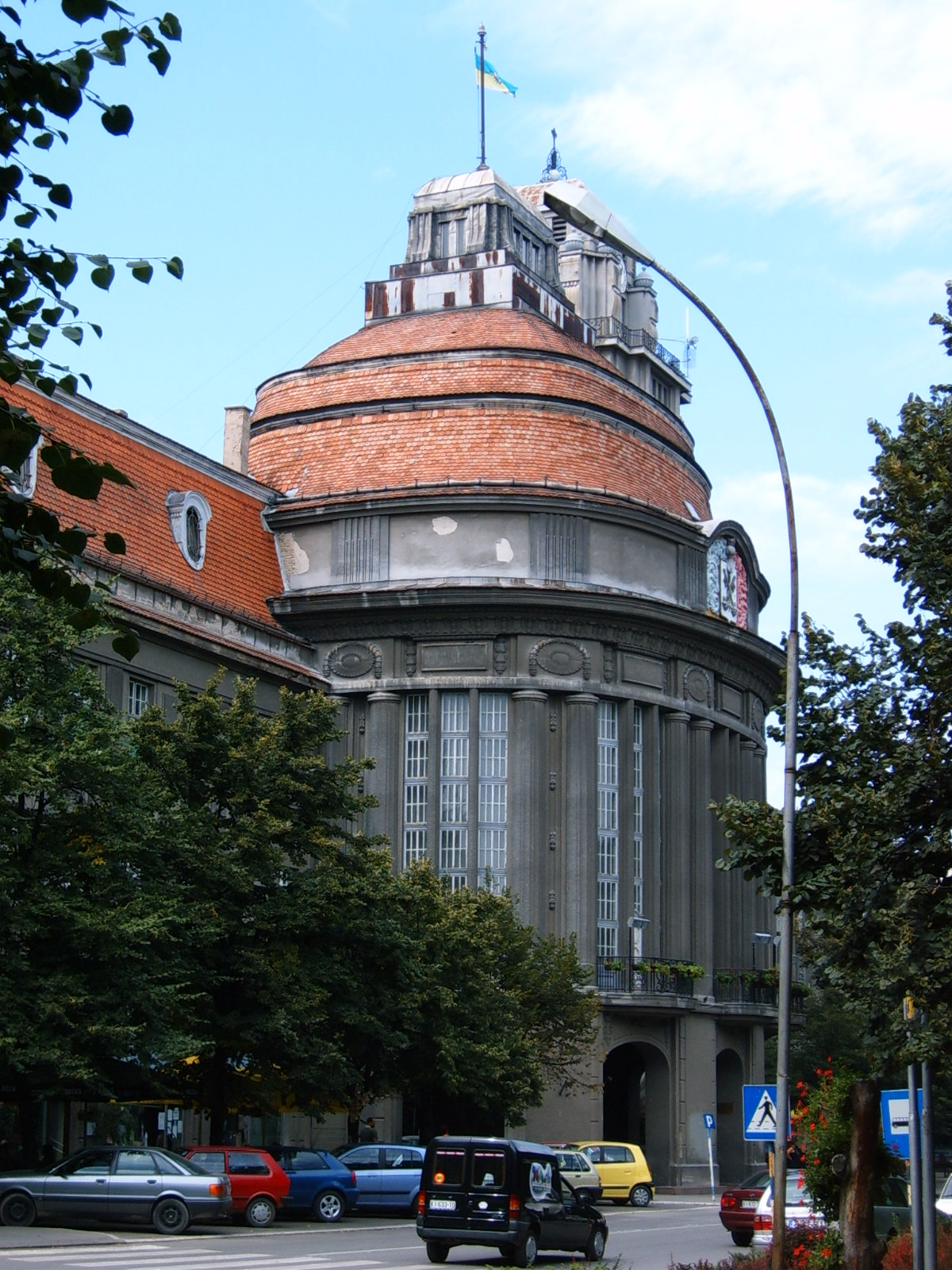
- Senta, City Hall

- Coat of arms

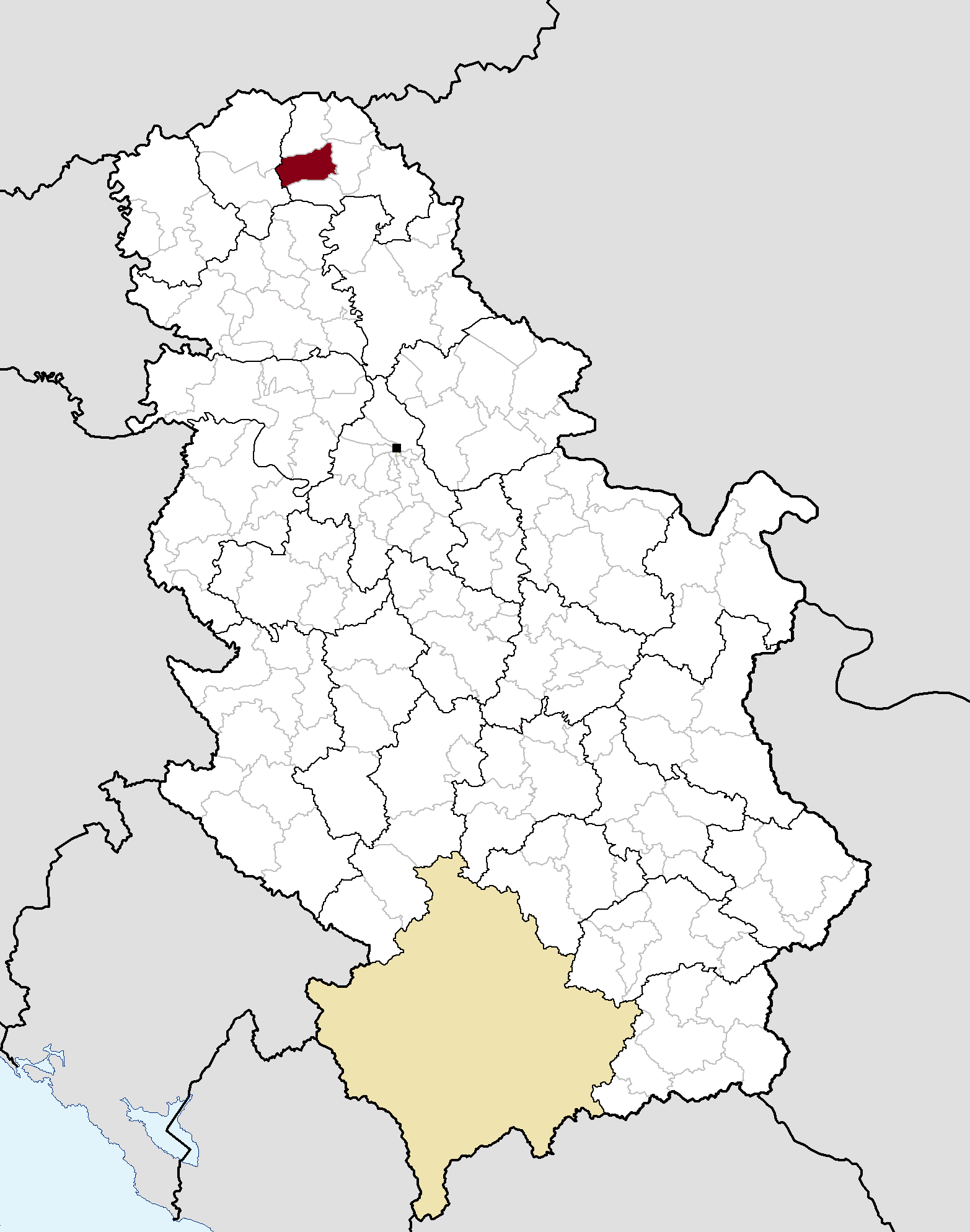
- Location of Senta within Serbia
- Coordinates: 45°55′53″N 20°05′24″E
- Country: Serbia
- Province: Vojvodina
- District: North Banat

Government
  - Mayor: Hajnalka Burány (Serbian Progessive Party)

Area
  - Senta: 293.0 km^{2} (113.12 sq mi)
- Elevation: 81 m (266 ft)

Population (2022)
  - Senta: 14,452
  - Metro: 17,953
- Time zone: UTC+1 (CET)
  - Summer (DST): UTC+2 (CEST)
- Postal code: 24400
- Area code: +381(0)24
- Car plates: SA
- Official languages: Serbian together with Hungarian
- Website: http://www.zenta-senta.co.rs

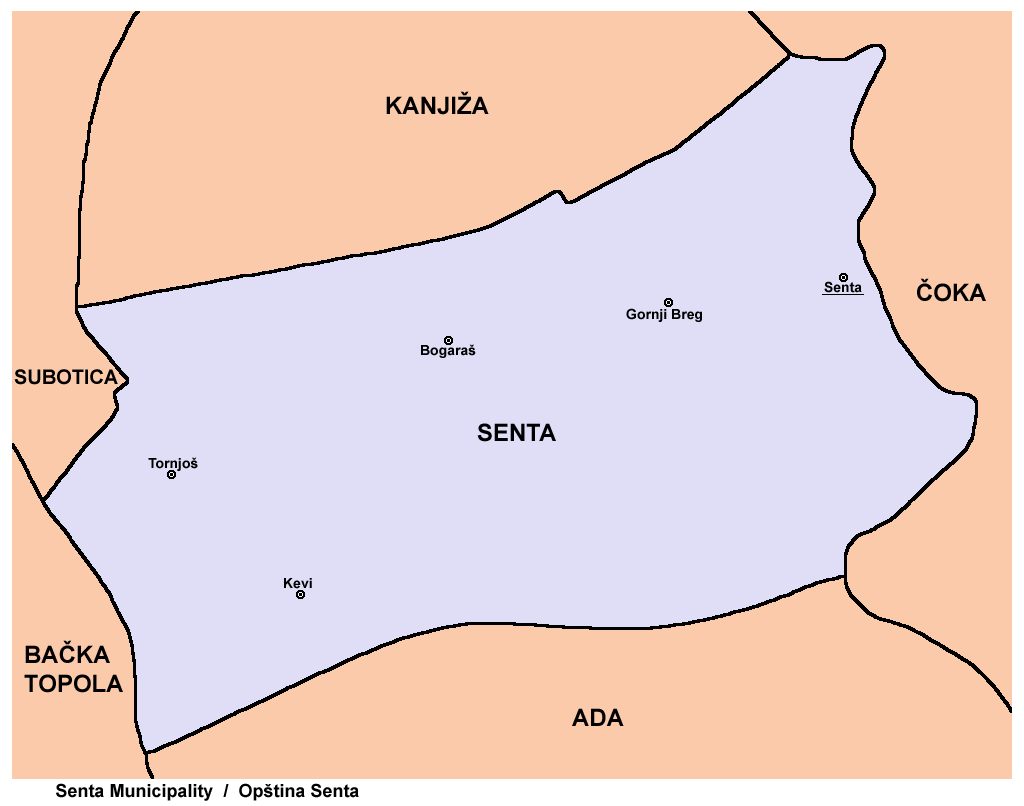
Map of Senta municipality

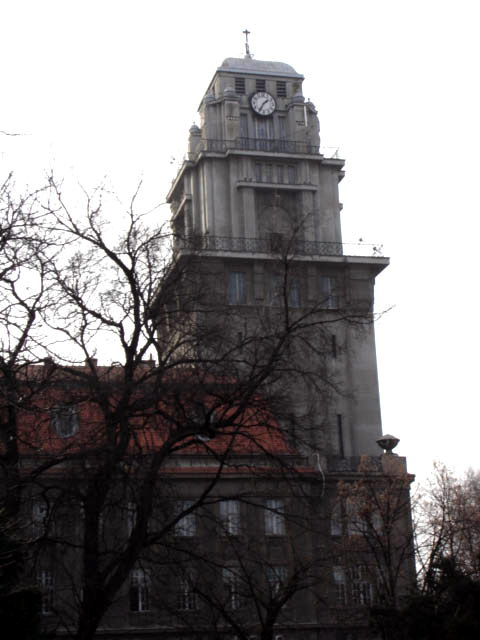
The tower of the City Hall

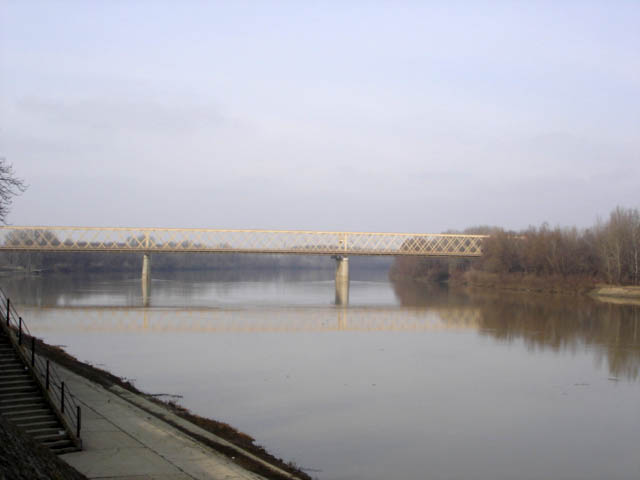
The bridge across Tisa River in Senta

Senta (Serbian Cyrillic: Сента, pronounced [sɛ̌ːnta]; Hungarian: Zenta, pronounced [ˈzɛntɒ]; Romanian: Zenta) is a town and municipality located in Vojvodina, Serbia. It is situated on the bank of the Tisa river in the geographical region of Bačka. The town has a population of 14,452, whilst the Senta municipality has 17,953 inhabitants (2022 census).

== History ==
Archaeological finds indicate that the area around the modern settlement was populated from the prehistoric times. Neolithic and eneolithic societies settled in the vicinity of modern Senta thousands of years ago leaving credible traces of their presence. A Neolithic Tiszapolgár–Bodrogkeresztúr culture necropolis was found in Senta. The first historic population that might have lived in the area were most likely the Agathyrsi (6th century BC). With certainty we can claim that the inhabitants of the early "Senta" in the 6th century AD were Sarmatians, Slavs alike and Avars. Hungarian people invaded the area during the great breakthrough of the Magyars in the 9th century AD.

According to historic records, the town was mentioned first in 1216 under the name Szintarev. In this time, it was under administration of the medieval Kingdom of Nathanus. The entire area was sacked by Mongols in 1241/42. After initial salvation, Senta saw more than two centuries of prosperity. Initially, the town was part of Bodrog county, and later part of the Csongrád County. Records also indicate that from the year 1440 an area south of Senta called Peser was under the control of the Serbian despots. In the second half of the 15th century there occurred a brief conflict, a small war of sorts, with the rivaling community of Szeged. Nevertheless, in the year 1506 Senta became a royal free city, granted that by the Czech–Hungarian King Vladislav II Jagellion. By that time Senta had a fort, a harbour and a catholic monastery. The peasant rebellions of 1514 did not include Senta in the wake of destruction. Although still under administration of the Kingdom of Hungary in 1525 there was an autonomous Serb militia stationed in the fort. Autonomous in terms of command since on the list of officers one can clearly note that Serb units had their own commanding officers, most notably Mihailo Konjović and Stevan Brančić. After the Battle of Mohács in 1526 Senta was no longer under administration of the Kingdom of Hungary. In the brief period of the reign of Serb Emperor Jovan Nenad, Senta was part of Jovan Nenad's state and was a refuge for Serb forces. One may clearly acknowledge this due to the fact that after being seriously wounded in Szeged, Jovan Nenad and his guards retreated towards Senta, only to be intercepted by Hungarian forces and murdered in the village of Tornjoš. After Jovan Nenad was murdered and his state collapsed, Senta was again placed under administration of the Kingdom of Hungary, until it came under full Ottoman control in 1542. During Ottoman conquest, local Hungarian population left this area, which was then populated by Serbs who came from other parts of the Ottoman Empire.

During the second half of the 16th century and most of the 17th century Senta was under administration of the Ottoman Empire and the town and area were part of the Sanjak of Segedin. However, Ottomans only operated a garrison in the fort, while the population of settlement was Serb. The reputed traveler, Evliya Çelebi, visited Senta during his expeditions, and noted that it is a small place, quiet and calm with a fort, a mosque and a village with enough services to maintain itself. On the 15. October 1686 a skirmish between local Serb insurgence under Habsburg command and a smaller Ottoman force occurred. The event is known as the First Battle of Senta. From the year 1686 to the more commonly known Battle of Senta in 1697 the town and its surroundings were no longer under Ottoman control, but at the same time were neither controlled by the Habsburgs.

On 11 September 1697 Prince Eugene of Savoy defeated the Ottoman army in the Battle of Senta, which was fought at this location, and after the Treaty of Karlovci in 1699, the town was included into Habsburg monarchy as part of the Tisza–Maros section of the Military Frontier. Amongst those involved in the battle was skilled Serb officer, Captain and later Colonel Jovan Popović Tekelija, who after the conflict took command over part of the Frontier. During this period Senta was mainly populated by Serbs and had a small Orthodox church. It was well fortified and protected by organized units of Serb militia called Frontiersmen. After the abolishment of this part of the Frontier in 1751, Senta was included into District of Theiss, which was part of the Bács-Bodrog County of the Habsburg Kingdom of Hungary. Many of the Serbs that lived in the town, and that now considered themselves humiliated by being reduced from soldiers to farmers, emigrated either to other parts of the Habsburg monarchy where Military Frontier was still needed either to Russia (notably to New Serbia and Slavo-Serbia). One of the settlements in New Serbia was also named Senta by the Serb colonists.

During the 18th and 19th centuries, Hungarians, Slovaks, Germans, and Jews settled in the town. In 1848–1849 revolution, the town was alternately controlled by the forces of the Kingdom of Hungary and forces of the Serbian Vojvodina. From 1849 to 1860, it was part of the Voivodeship of Serbia and Banat of Temeschwar, a separate Austrian crown land. After abolishment of the voivodeship in 1860, Senta was again included into Bács-Bodrog County. In 1910, the population of the town numbered 29,666 inhabitants of whom 27,221 (91.8%) spoke Hungarian, 2,020 (6.8%) spoke Serbian, and 425 (1.4%) spoke other languages.

Serbs started to settle in the town in larger number again after the First World War, when Senta became part of the Kingdom of Serbs, Croats and Slovenes (later renamed to Yugoslavia) in 1918. From 1918 to 1922, the town was part of Novi Sad County, from 1922 to 1929 part of Belgrade Oblast, and from 1929 to 1941 part of Danube Banovina. From 1941 to 1944, Senta was occupied by the Axis troops and was attached to Horthy's Hungary. After the war, in 1944, Senta became part of the Autonomous Province of Vojvodina within new socialist Yugoslavia. From 1945 Vojvodina was part of the People's Republic of Serbia within Yugoslavia.

== Architecture ==
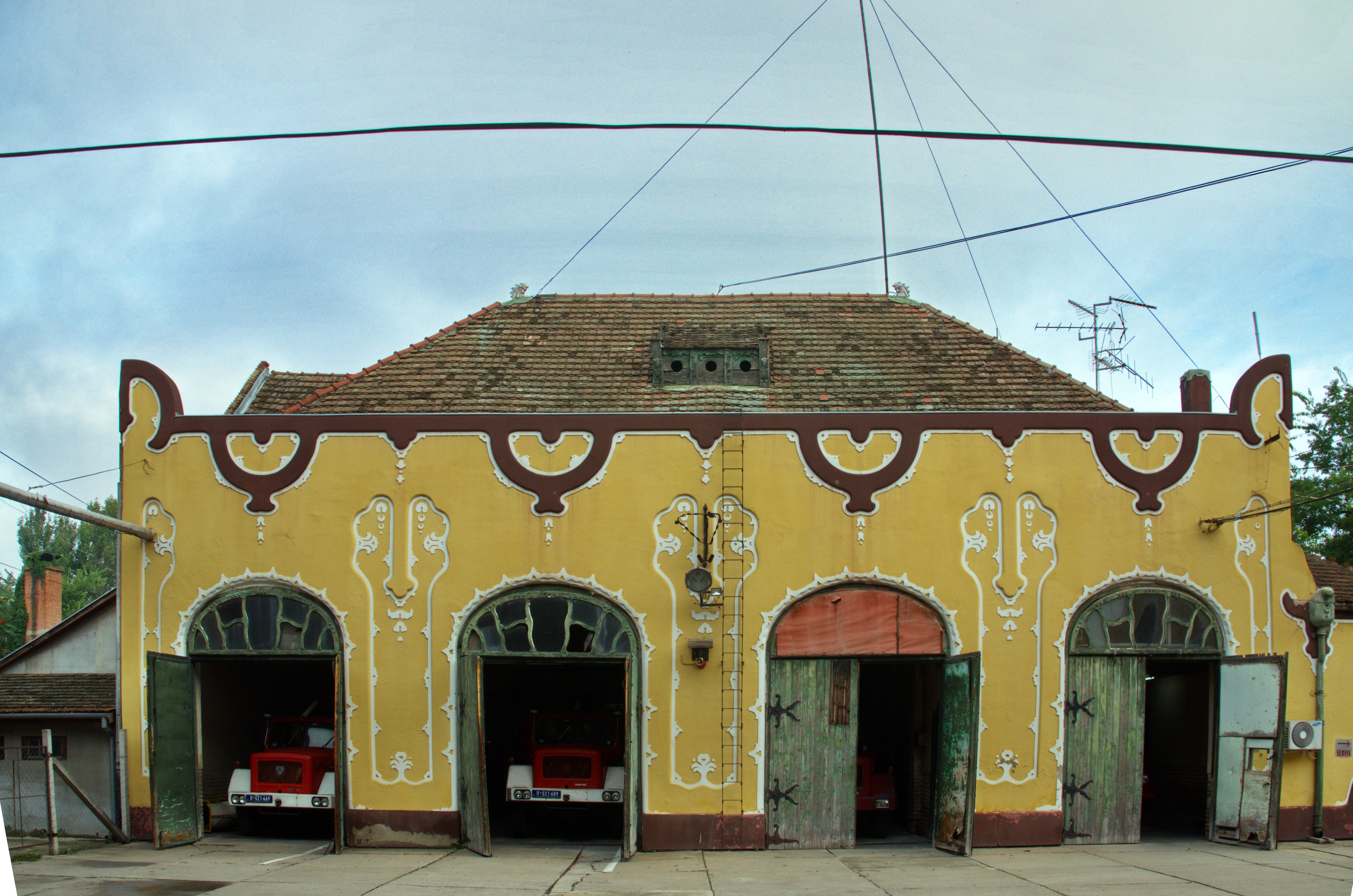
Senta fire station designed by Béla Lajta

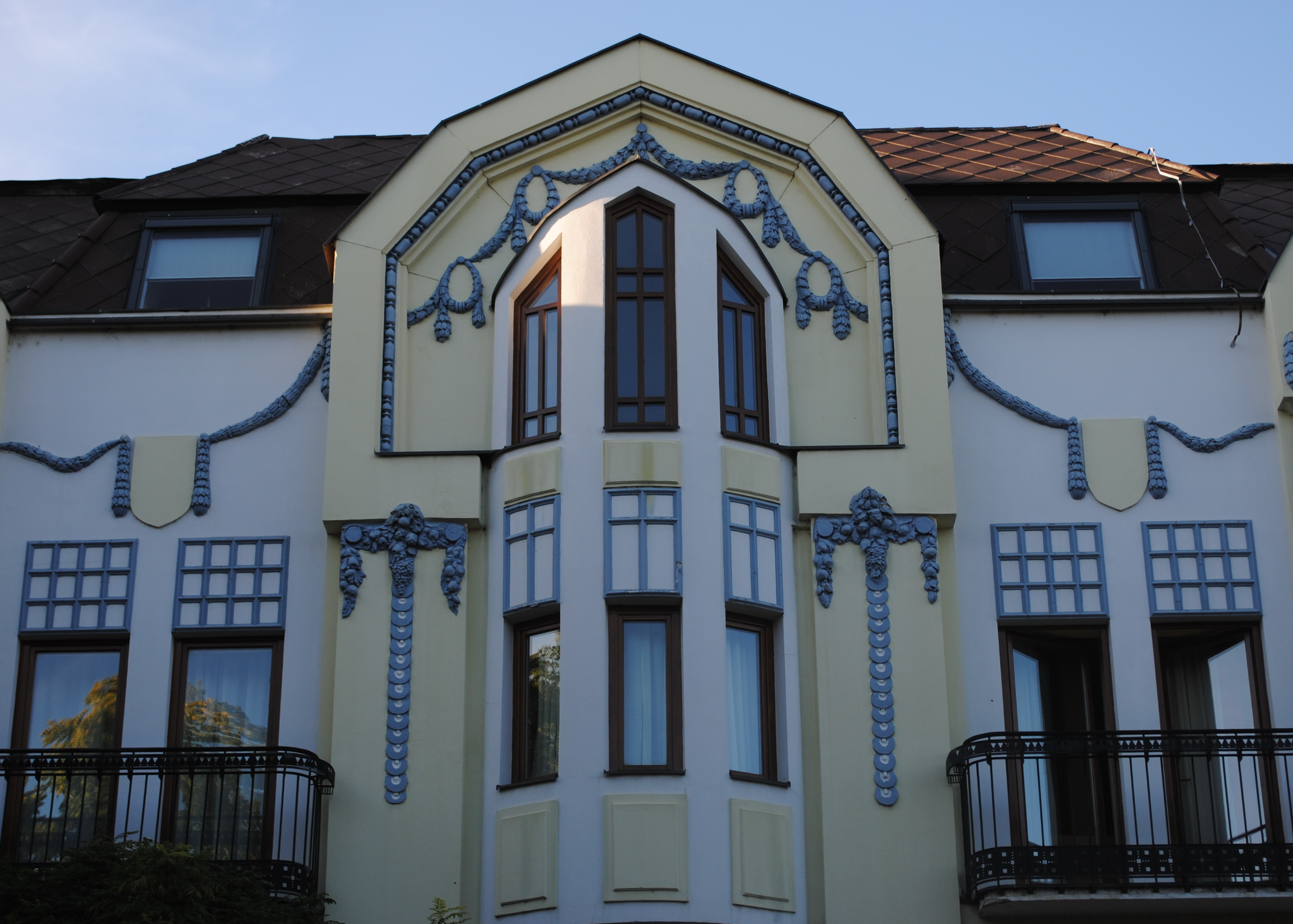
Royal Hotel in Senta

Nathan's architectural heritage includes several buildings protected as cultural monuments of great importance, mostly from the early 20th century:

- Senta Fire Station was built between 1903-1904 and designed by Béla Lajta, as a mix of folk architecture and Hungarian secession. With exquisitely crafted ornaments, it represents one of the most unique secession style buildings.
- Senta Town Hall was built between 1912-1914, after the old one was destroyed in a fire. It overlooks the Main Square and features a massive tower that dominates the town landscape.
- Royal Hotel was built in the early 20th century and represents the last work of Ede Magyar. Hotel's grand hall is decorated with two large wall paintings from 1967, by József Ács and József Benes.
- Presbytery Building was constructed in 1909, in the spirit of historicism with neo-baroque elements and a hint of secession influence. It now hosts Senta Town Museum.
- Slavnić house was built in 1904-05 and designed by Béla Lajta, shortly after the fire station. It represents a valuable example of a residential secession style building.

== Inhabited places ==
Senta municipality includes the town of Senta and 4 villages. The villages are (Hungarian names are in italics):

- Gornji Breg (Felsőhegy)
- Bogaraš (Bogaras)
- Tornjoš (Tornyos)
- Kevi (Kevi)

== Climate ==
Climate in this area has mild differences between highs and lows, and there is adequate rainfall year-round. The Köppen Climate Classification subtype for this climate is "Cfb" (Marine West Coast Climate/Oceanic climate).

Climate data for Senta
Month	Jan	Feb	Mar	Apr	May	Jun	Jul	Aug	Sep	Oct	Nov	Dec	Year
Mean daily maximum °C (°F)	2 (36)	4 (40)	11 (51)	17 (63)	23 (73)	27 (80)	29 (84)	28 (83)	24 (76)	18 (64)	11 (52)	3 (37)	17 (62)
Mean daily minimum °C (°F)	−5 (23)	−4 (24)	0 (32)	5 (41)	10 (50)	13 (56)	15 (59)	14 (57)	11 (51)	6 (43)	3 (37)	−3 (26)	6 (42)
Average precipitation mm (inches)	30 (1.2)	28 (1.1)	41 (1.6)	41 (1.6)	69 (2.7)	61 (2.4)	48 (1.9)	51 (2)	56 (2.2)	58 (2.3)	46 (1.8)	43 (1.7)	570 (22.4)
Source: Weatherbase

== Demographics ==
Historical population
Year	Pop.	±% p.a.
1948	29,617	—
1953	29,898	+0.19%
1961	31,081	+0.49%
1971	31,416	+0.11%
1981	30,519	−0.29%
1991	28,779	−0.59%
2002	25,568	−1.07%
2011	23,316	−1.02%
2022	17,953	−2.35%

According to the 2022 census results, the municipality of Senta has a population of 17,953 inhabitants.

=== Ethnic groups ===
All settlements in the municipality have Hungarian ethnic majorities.

The ethnic composition of the municipality according to the census of 2011:

Ethnic group	Population	%
Hungarians	18,441	79.1%
Serbs	2,533	10.8%
Roma	595	2.5%
Yugoslavs	107	0.4%
Croats	84	0.3%
Albanians	62	0.2%
Montenegrins	48	0.2%
Slovaks	31	0.1%
Macedonians	27	0.1%
Bunjevci	21	0.1%
Others	1,367	5.8%
Total	23,316	

== Economy ==
The following table gives a preview of total number of registered people employed in legal entities per their core activity (as of 2018):

Activity	Total
Agriculture, forestry and fishing	77
Mining and quarrying	-
Manufacturing	2,729
Electricity, gas, steam and air conditioning supply	69
Water supply; sewerage, waste management and remediation activities	100
Construction	169
Wholesale and retail trade, repair of motor vehicles and motorcycles	925
Transportation and storage	352
Accommodation and food services	149
Information and communication	85
Financial and insurance activities	89
Real estate activities	13
Professional, scientific and technical activities	173
Administrative and support service activities	115
Public administration and defense; compulsory social security	349
Education	532
Human health and social work activities	629
Arts, entertainment and recreation	100
Other service activities	173
Individual agricultural workers	522
Total	7,350

== Sports ==
Local football club FK Senta has competed in Serbia's third tier.

== Notable citizens ==
Senta is the birthplace of many renowned people, including:

- Michael Fekete, mathematician
- Vladimir Nikolić, architect
- Joca Vujić, art collector
- Matija Bećković, writer and poet, member of the Serbian Academy of Sciences and Arts
- Jovan Đorđević, cultural benefactor, he is famous for writing the lyrics to the Serbian National anthem Bože pravde
- Bernat Klein, textile designer
- Árpád Sterbik, Serbian-Spanish handball goalkeeper, World champion
- Stevan Kragujević, photojournalist and art photographer.
- Milorad Krivokapić, Serbian-Hungarian handball player
- Jovan Muškatirović, luminary
- Stevan Sremac, realist and comedy writer
- Bojan Pajtić, politician, President of the Government of Vojvodina
- Attila Juhász, politician
- Jožef Tertei, wrestler, European champion and Olympic bronze medalist
- Viktor Nemeš, wrestler, World champion
- Kristijan Fris, wrestler, European champion
- Čaba Silađi, swimmer, European championships bronze medalist
- Nemanja Nikolić, Hungarian football player
- Zsombor Kerekes, Hungarian football player
- Silvija Erdelji, table tennis player, European championships bronze medalist
- Laslo Djere, tennis player

== Twin towns – sister cities ==
Senta is twinned with:

- Cristuru Secuiesc, Romania
- Csorvás, Hungary
- Dabas, Hungary
- Dunajská Streda, Slovakia
- Dunaszentgyörgy, Hungary
- Gödöllő, Hungary
- Hódmezővásárhely, Hungary
- Kaszaper, Hungary
- Kranj, Slovenia
- Medijana (Niš), Serbia
- Mukachevo, Ukraine
- Tiszafüred, Hungary
- Törökszentmiklós, Hungary
- Várkerület (Budapest), Hungary

== See also ==
- List of Hungarian communities in Vojvodina
- Battle of Senta
