= North Bačka District =

Administrative district of Serbia

North Bačka District Севернобачки округ
- Administrative district of Serbia
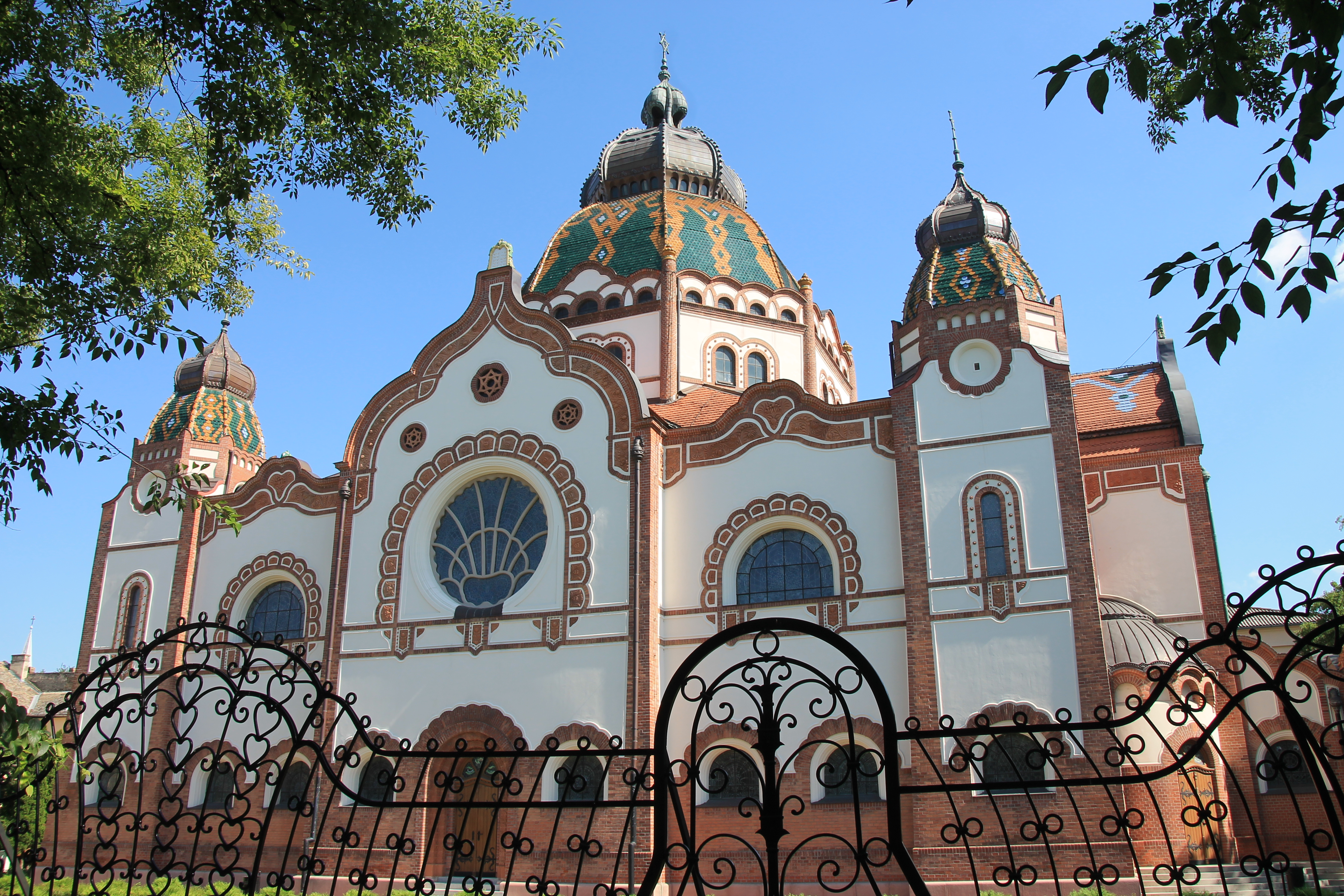
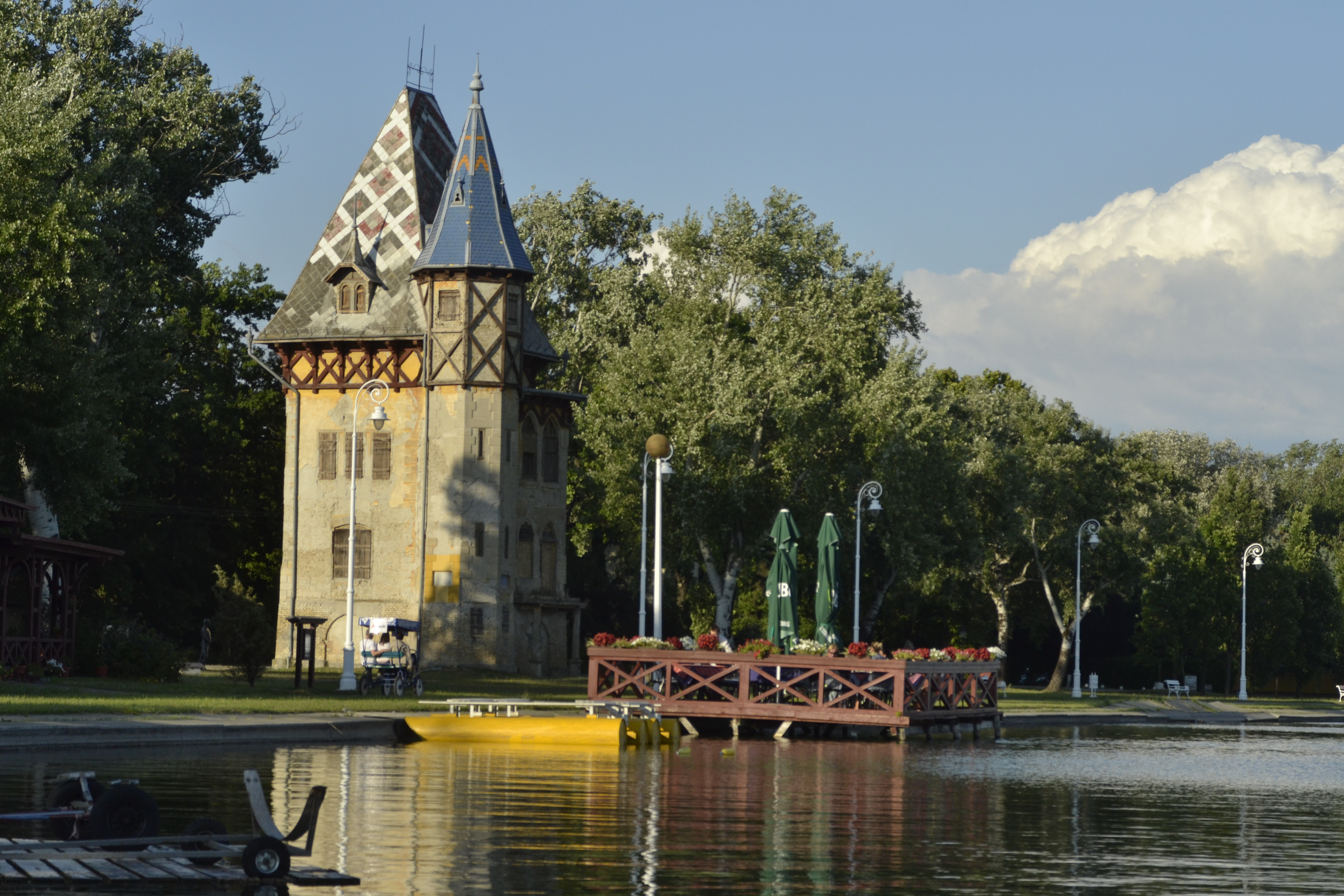
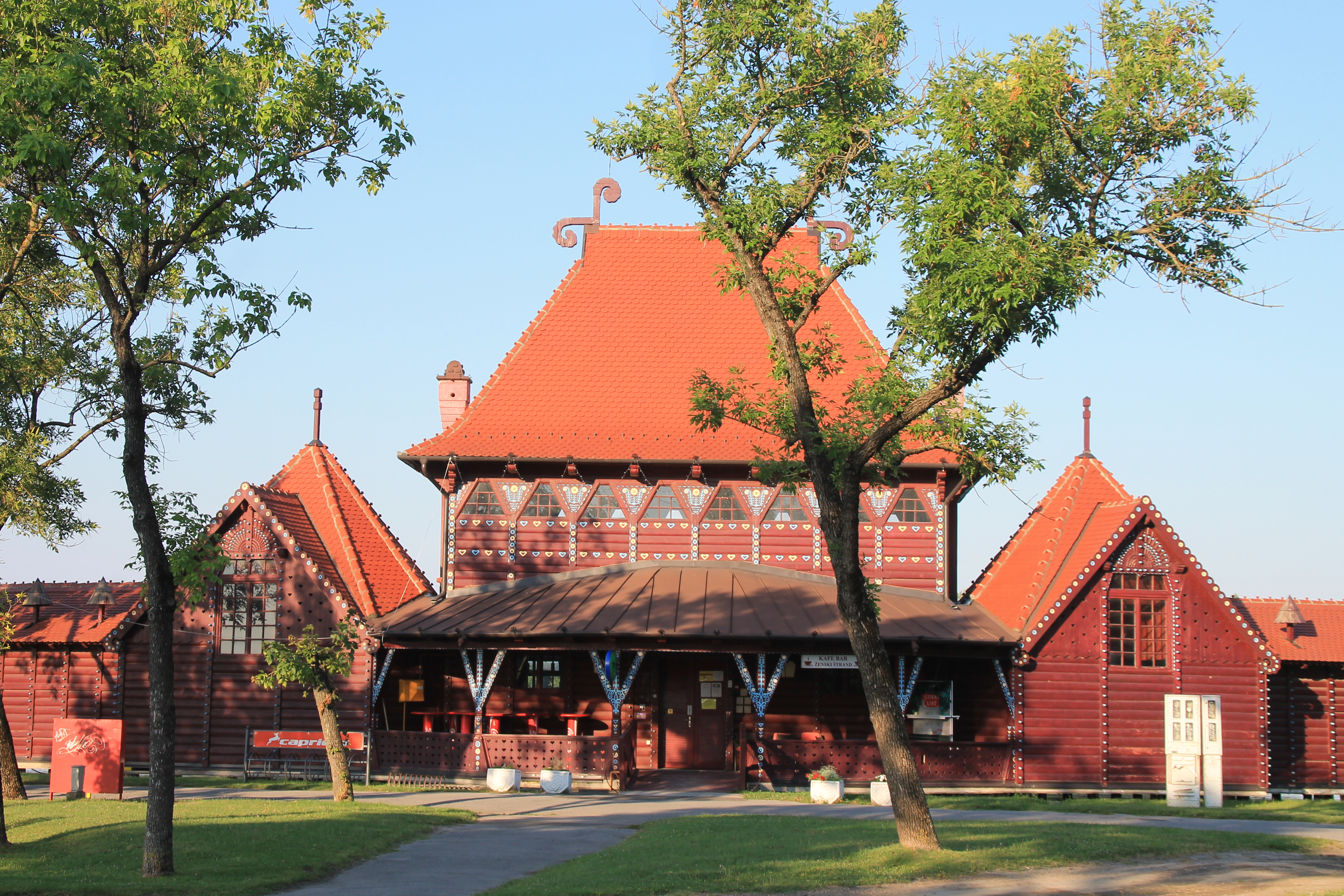
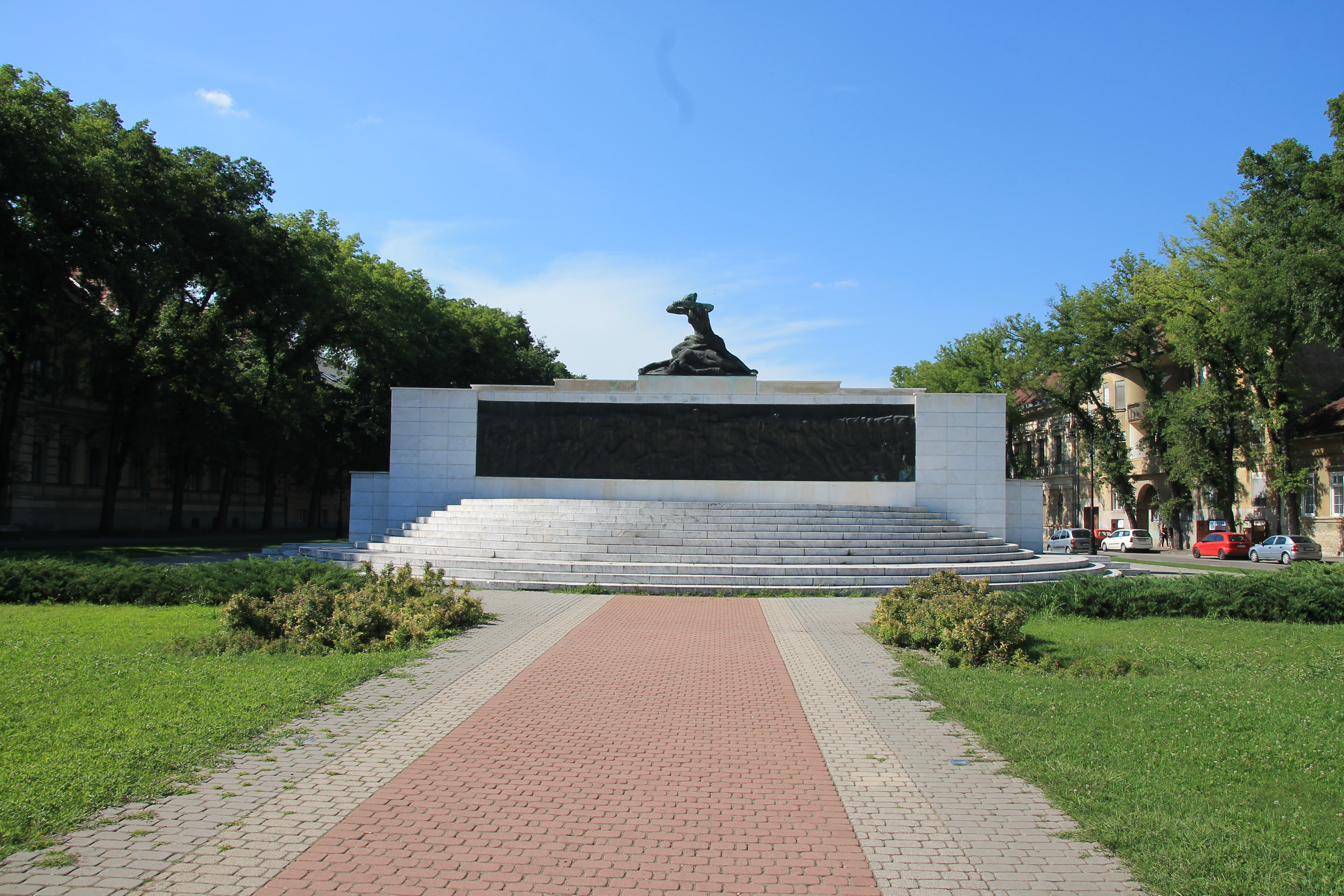
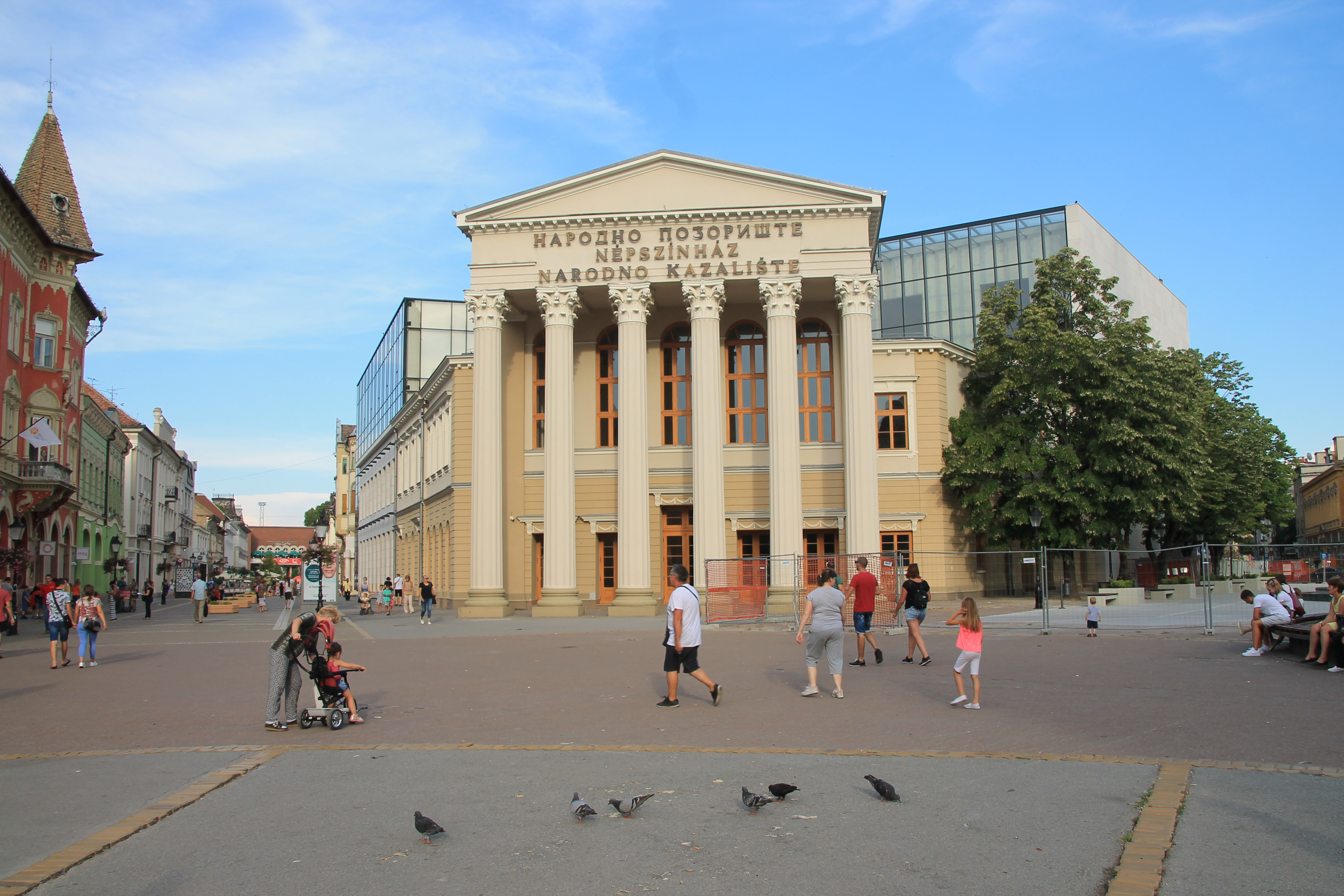
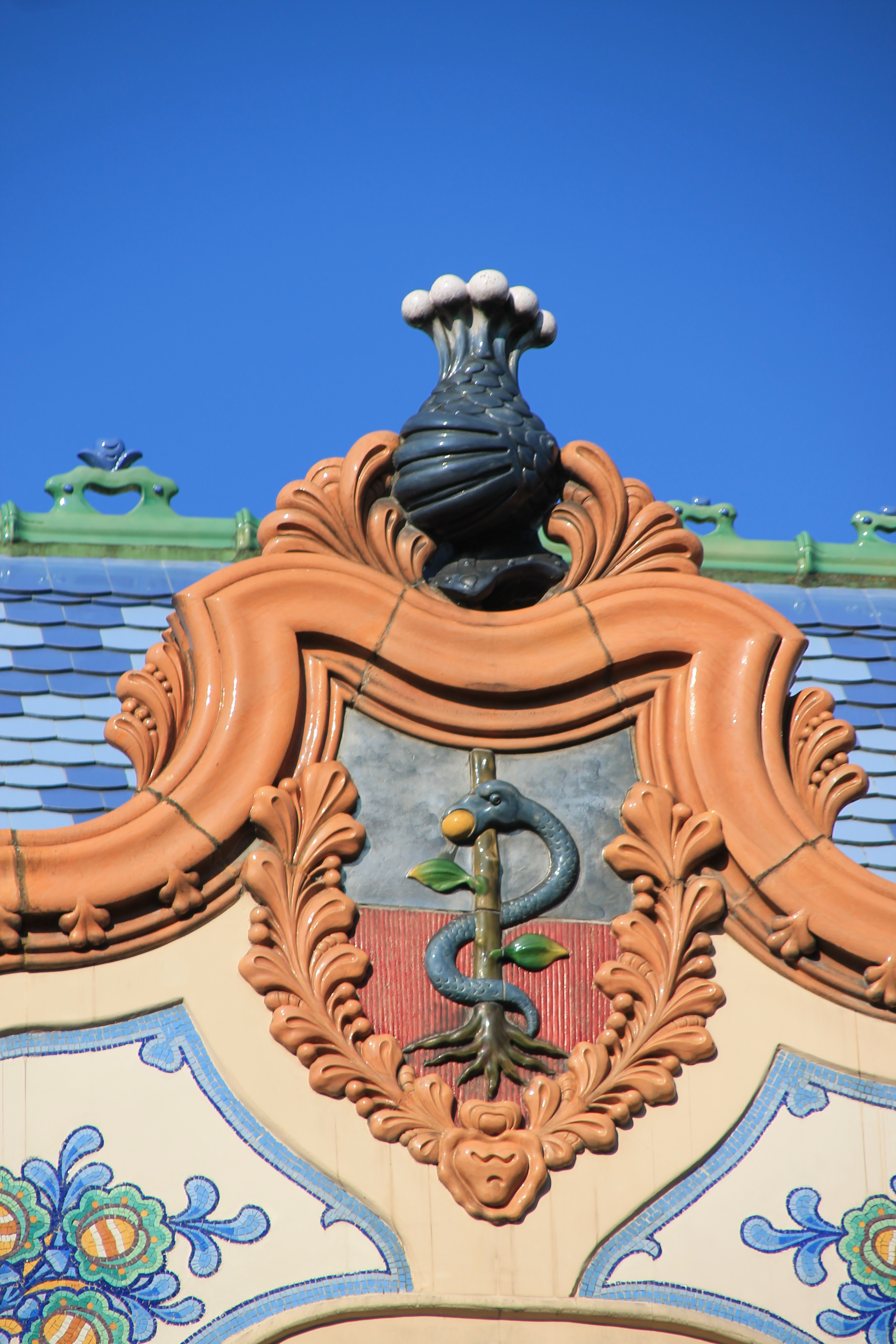
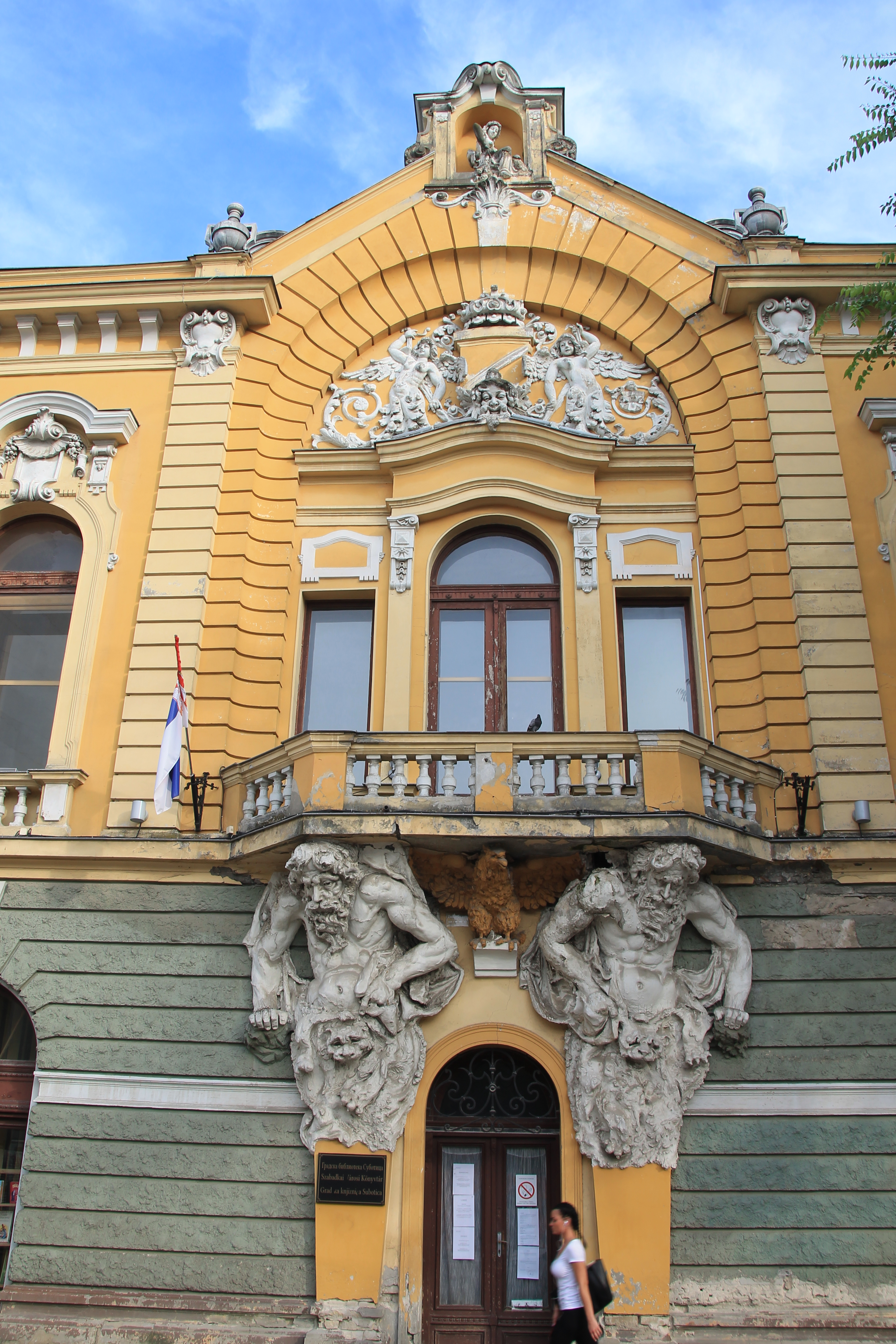
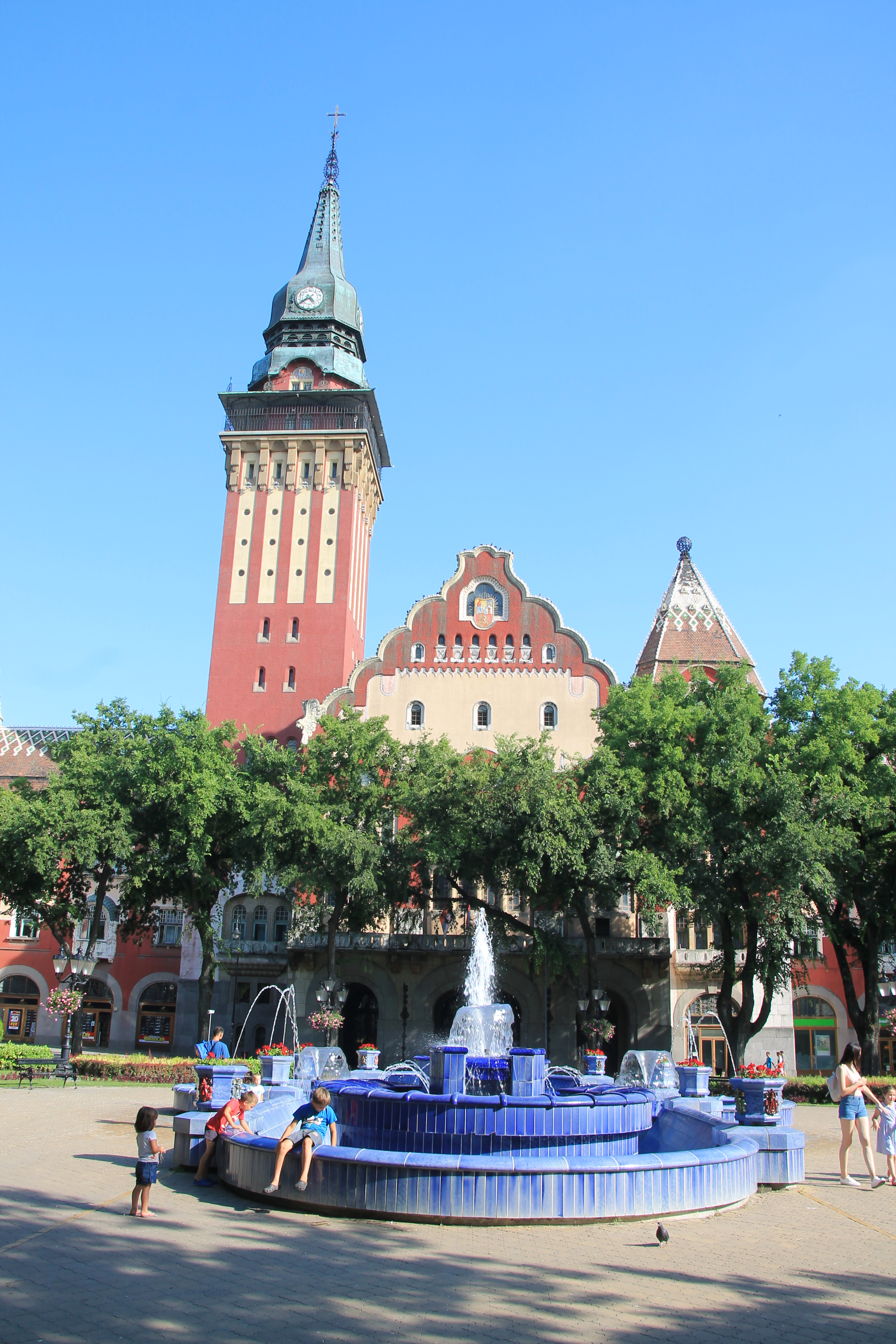
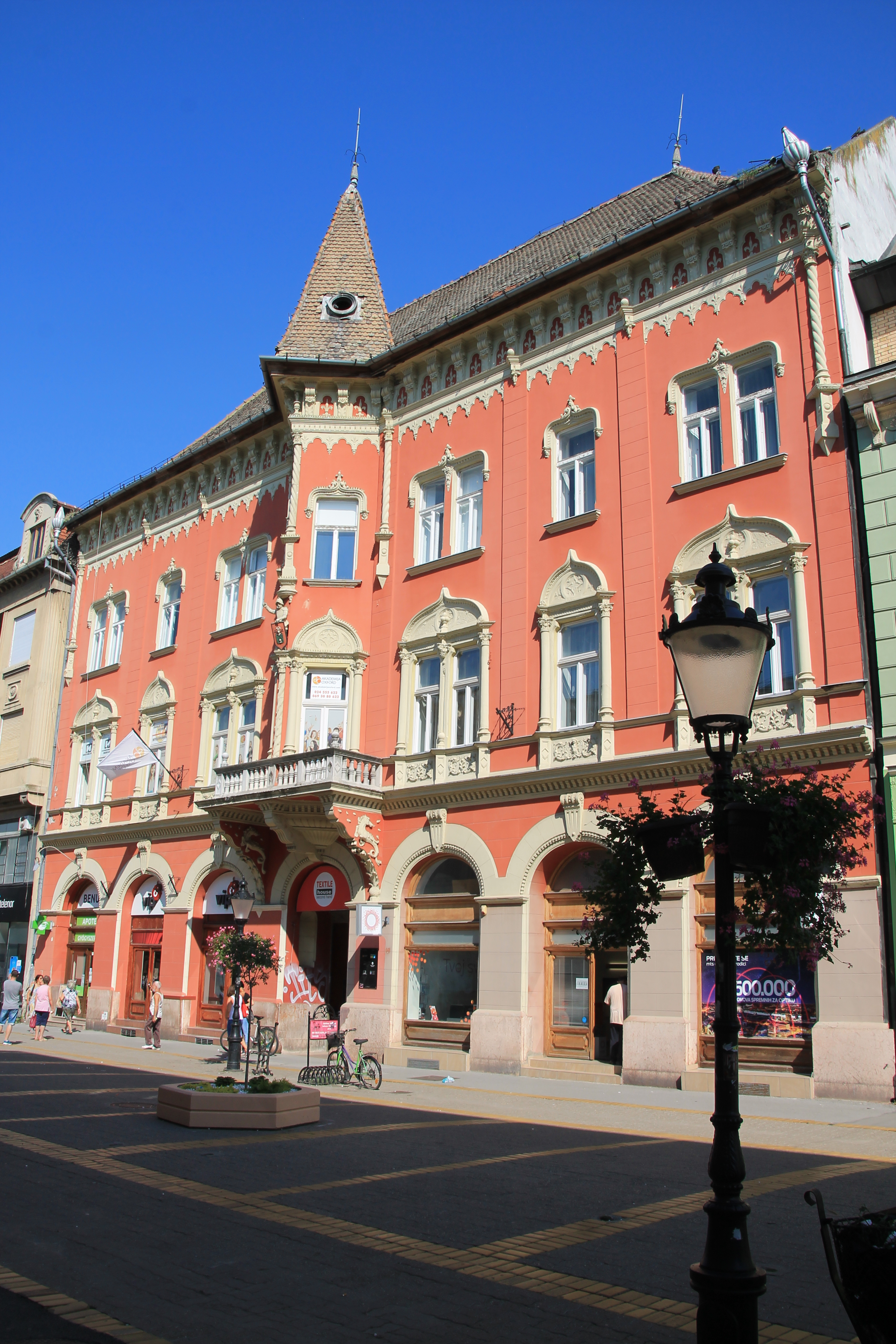
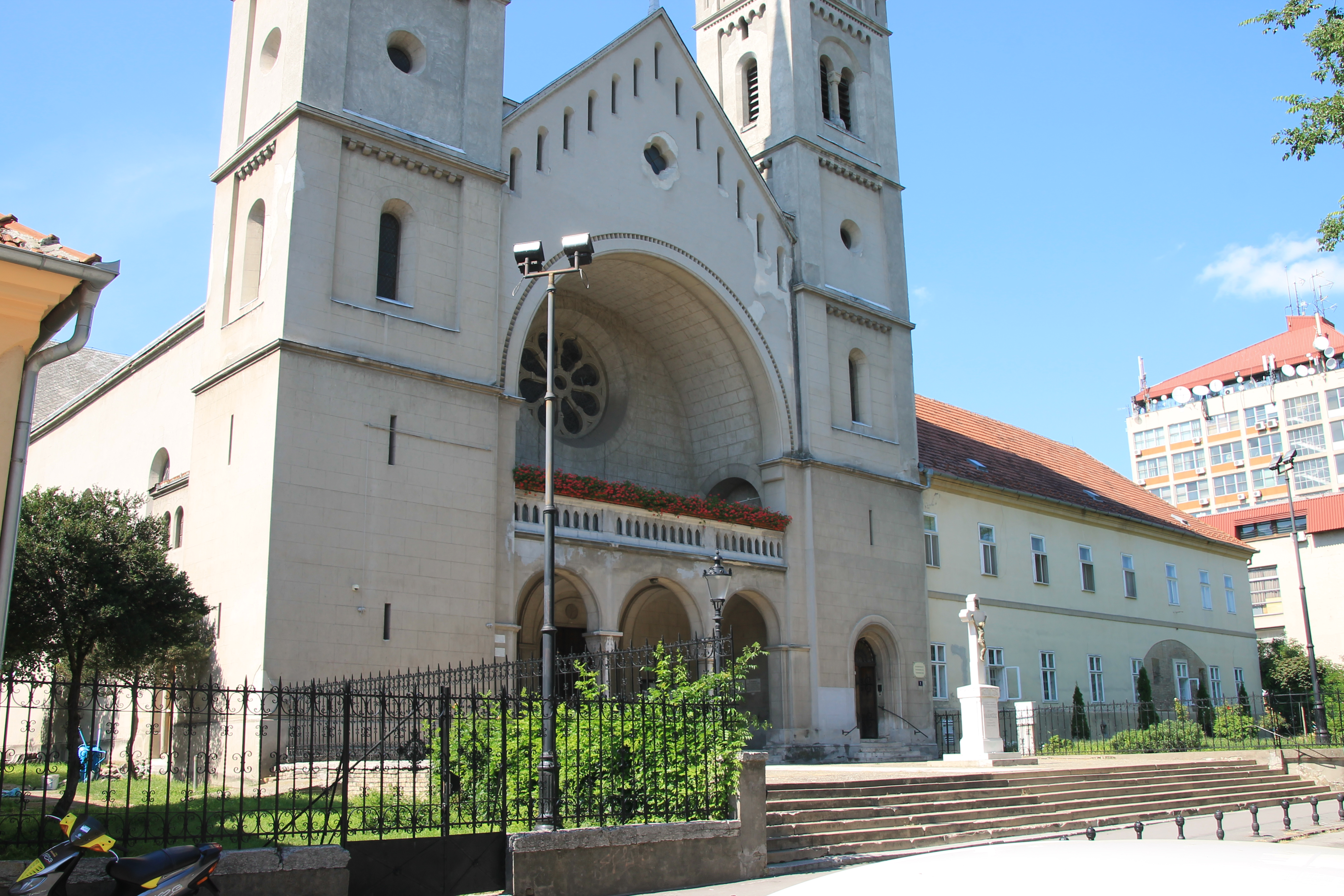
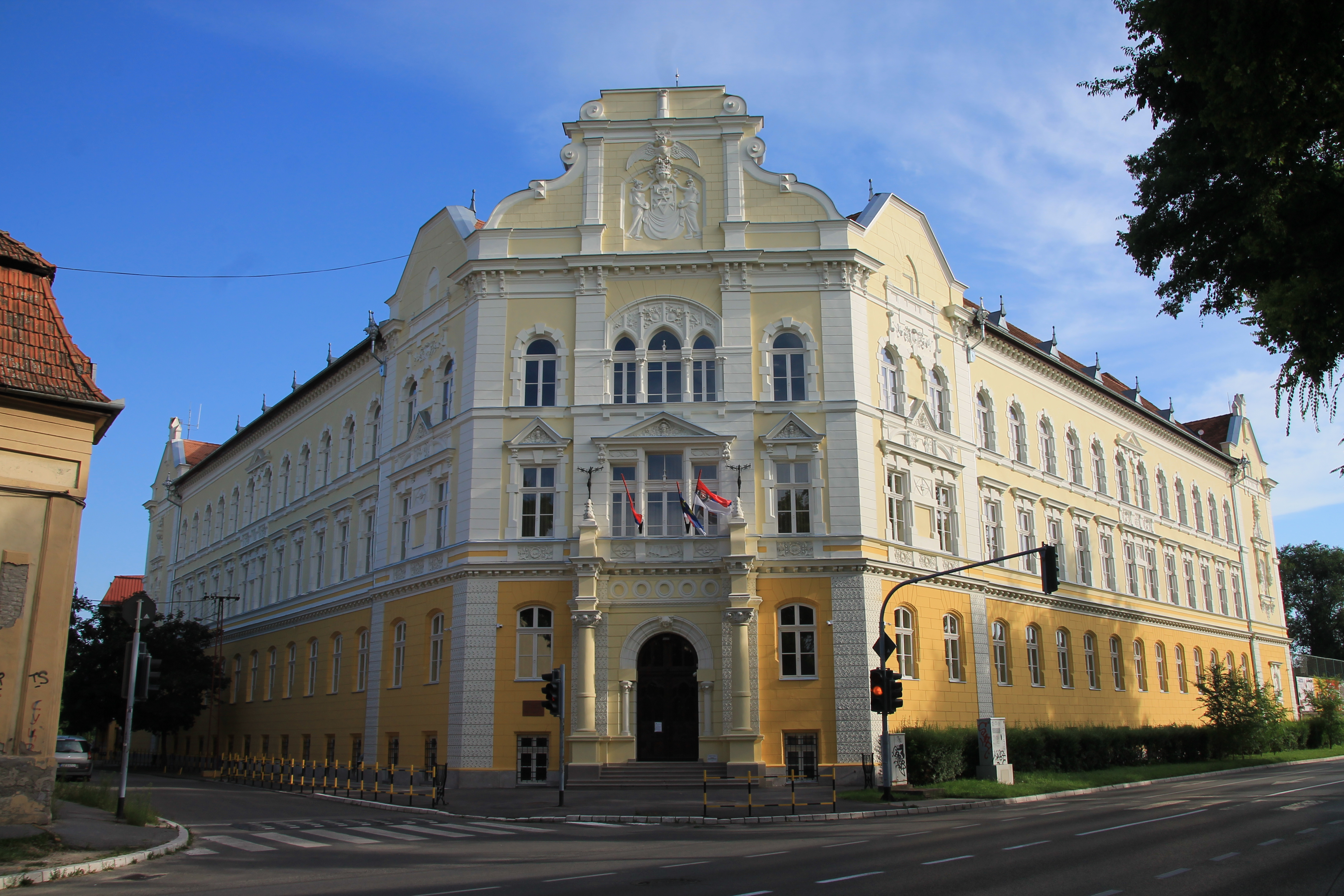
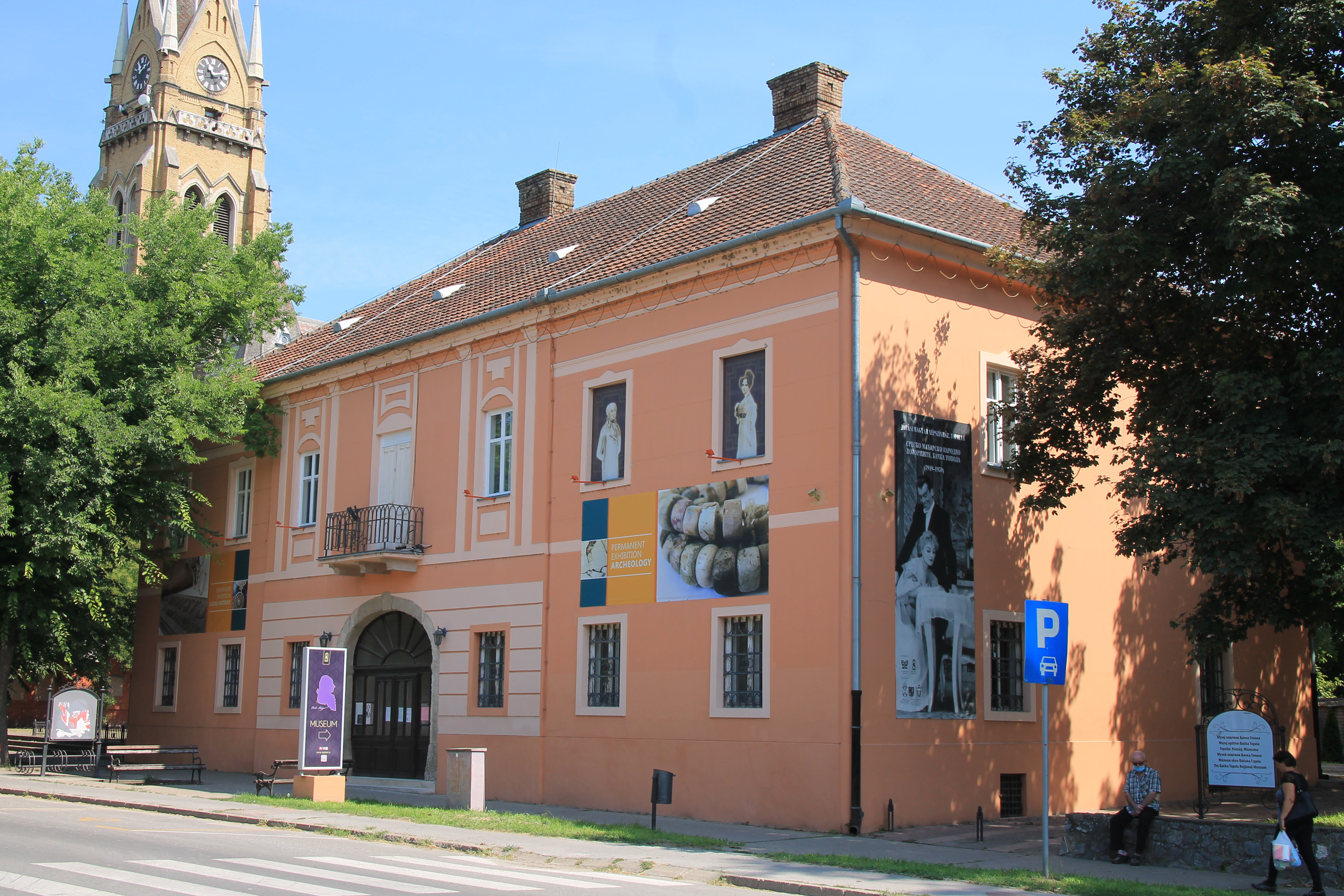
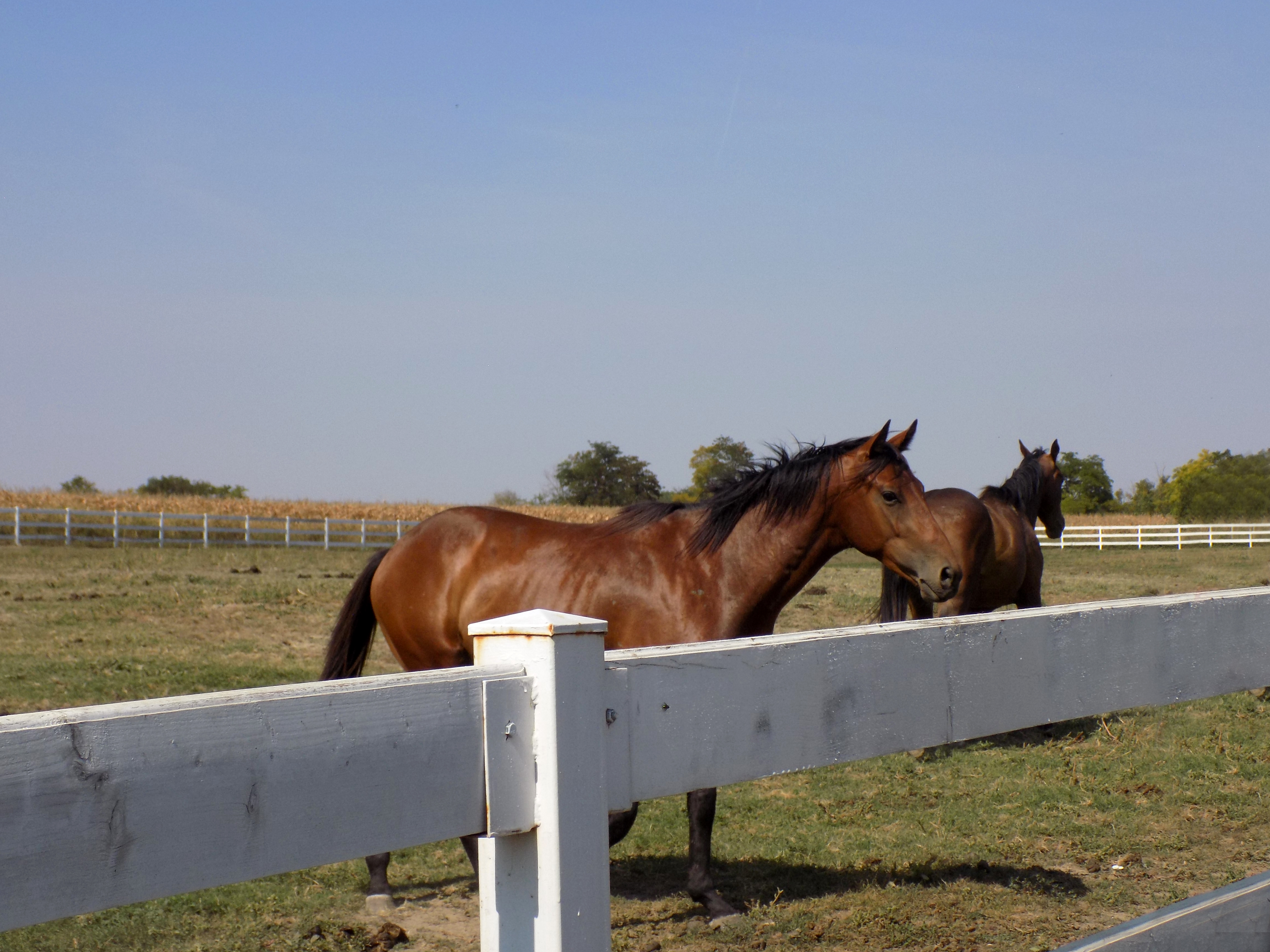
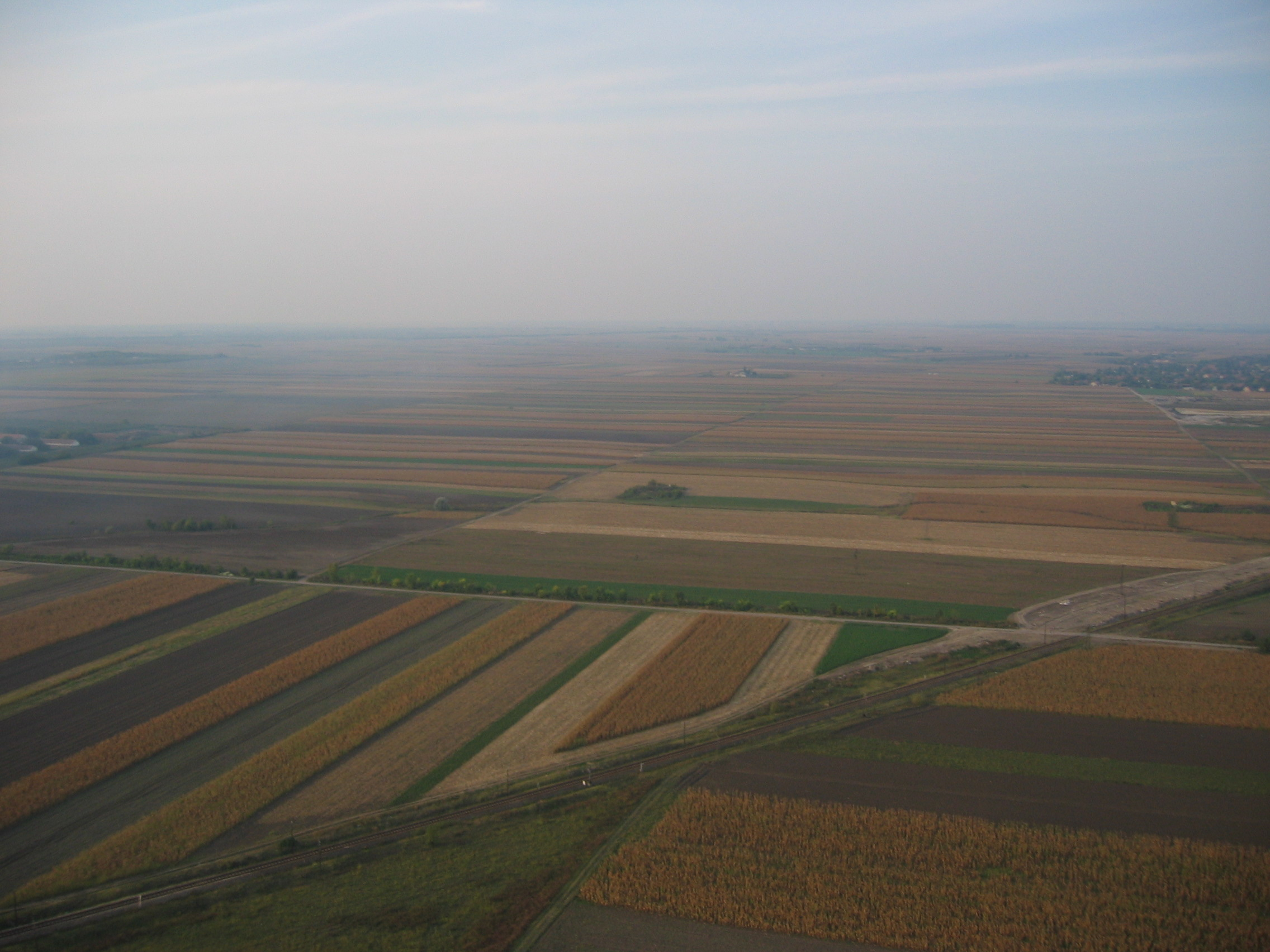
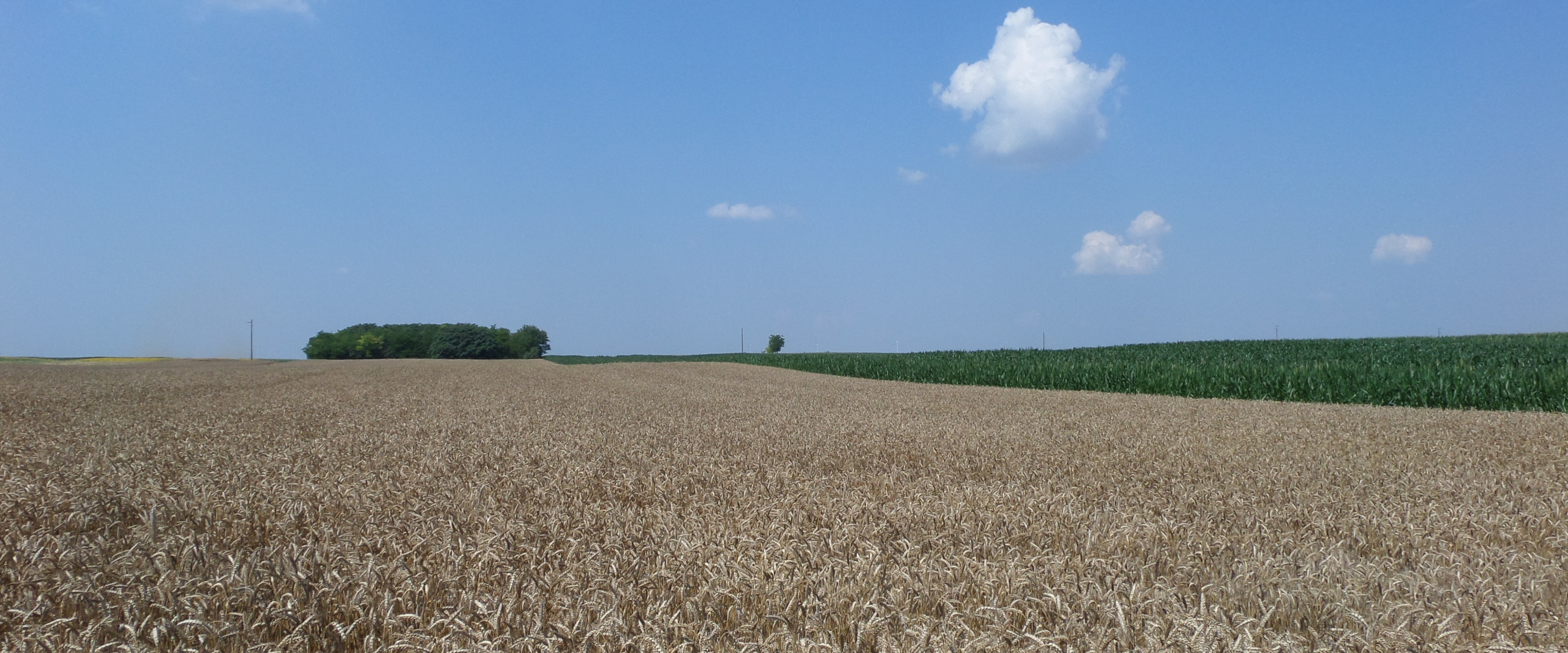
- Images from the North Bačka District

- Location of district in Serbia
- Country: Serbia
- Province: Vojvodina
- Administrative center: Subotica

Government
  - Commissioner: Bojan Šoralov

Area
  - Total: 1,784 km^{2} (689 sq mi)

Population (2022)
  - Total: 160,163
  - Density: 89.78/km^{2} (232.5/sq mi)
- ISO 3166 code: RS-01
- Municipalities: 2 and 1 city
- Settlements: 45
- Cities and towns: 3
- Villages: 42
- Website: severnobacki.okrug.gov.rs

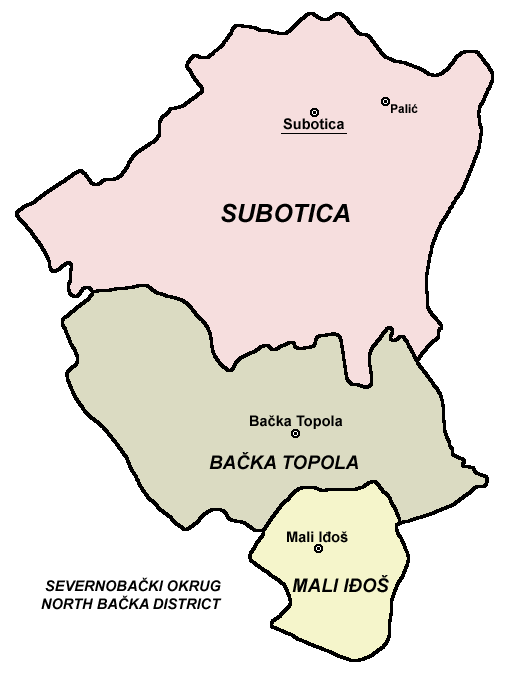
Map of the North Bačka District

The North Bačka District (Serbian: Севернобачки округ, romanized: Severnobački okrug, pronounced [sêʋeːrnobâːtʃkiː ôkruːɡ]) is one of administrative districts of Serbia. It lies in the geographical region of Bačka. According to the 2022 census, the North Bačka District has a population of 160,163 inhabitants. The administrative center of the district is the city of Subotica.

== History ==
In the 9th century, the area was ruled by the Bulgarian-Slavic duke Salan. From the 11th to the 16th century, during the administration of the medieval Kingdom of Hungary, the area was divided between the Bodrogiensis County, Bacsensis County, Csongradiensis County, and Cumania region. From 1526 to 1527, the area was ruled by the independent Serb ruler, emperor Jovan Nenad, while during Ottoman administration (16th to 17th century), it was part of the Sanjak of Segedin.

During Habsburg administration (18th century), the area was divided between the Military Frontier and the Batsch County. The Batsch County was joined with the Bodrog County into the single Batsch-Bodrog County in the 18th century. Since the abolishment of the Theiß-Marosch section of the Military Frontier in 1751, part of that territory was also included into the Batsch-Bodrog County. In the 1850s, the area was part of the Sombor District, and after 1860, it was again included into Batsch-Bodrog County.

During the royal Serb-Croat-Slovene (Yugoslav) administration (1918–1941), the area was part of the Novi Sad County (1918–1922), Bačka Oblast (1922–1929), and Danube Banovina (1929–1941).

During the Hungarian-German Axis occupation (1941–1944), the area was included into Bács-Bodrog County. From 1944, the area was part of the autonomous Yugoslav Vojvodina (which was part of the newly established Socialist Republic of Serbia from 1945). The present-day administrative districts of Serbia (including the North Bačka District) were established in 1992 by the decree of the Government of Serbia.

== Cities and municipalities ==
The North Bačka District encompasses the territories of one city and two municipalities:

- Subotica (Hungarian: Szabadka) (city)
- Bačka Topola (Hungarian: Topolya) (municipality)
- Mali Iđoš (Hungarian: Kishegyes) (municipality)

== Demographics ==
Historical population
| Year | Pop. | ±% |
|---|---|---|
| 1948 | 184,506 | — |
| 1953 | 186,569 | +1.1% |
| 1961 | 198,392 | +6.3% |
| 1971 | 205,929 | +3.8% |
| 1981 | 211,475 | +2.7% |
| 1991 | 205,401 | −2.9% |
| 2002 | 200,140 | −2.6% |
| 2011 | 186,906 | −6.6% |
| 2022 | 160,163 | −14.3% |

=== Towns ===
There are two towns with over 10,000 inhabitants.

- Subotica: 88,752
- Bačka Topola: 11,930

=== Ethnic structure ===
| Ethnicity | Population | Share |
|---|---|---|
| Hungarians | 56,973 | 35.6% |
| Serbs | 48,672 | 30.4% |
| Croats | 10,646 | 6.6% |
| Bunjevci | 9,171 | 5.7% |
| Roma | 3,981 | 2.5% |
| Others | 8,993 | 5.6% |
| Undeclared/Unknown | 21,727 | 13.5% |

Two municipalities have a Hungarian ethnic majority: Bačka Topola (55.6%) and Mali Iđoš (51.8%); while Subotica has Serb relative ethnic majority (34.3%). As for local communities, 20 have a Hungarian ethnic majority, 16 have a Serb ethnic majority, seven have Croatian/Bunjevci ethnic majority, and two are ethnically mixed, with a Hungarian relative ethnic majority.

=== Linguistic structure ===
| Language | Speakers | Share |
|---|---|---|
| Serbian | 72,425 | 45.2% |
| Hungarian | 56,398 | 35.2% |
| Croatian | 4,010 | 2.5% |
| Romani | 3,179 | 2.5% |

=== Religious structure ===
| Religion | Adherents | Share |
|---|---|---|
| Roman Catholic | 75,010 | 46.8% |
| Orthodox | 49,400 | 30.8% |
| Protestant | 6,096 | 3.8% |
| Islam | 3,747 | 2.3% |

== See also ==
- Administrative districts of Serbia
- Administrative divisions of Serbia
