= Battle of Szőreg =

Coordinates: 46°10′44″N 20°12′38″E

- Part of the Hungarian Revolution of 1848
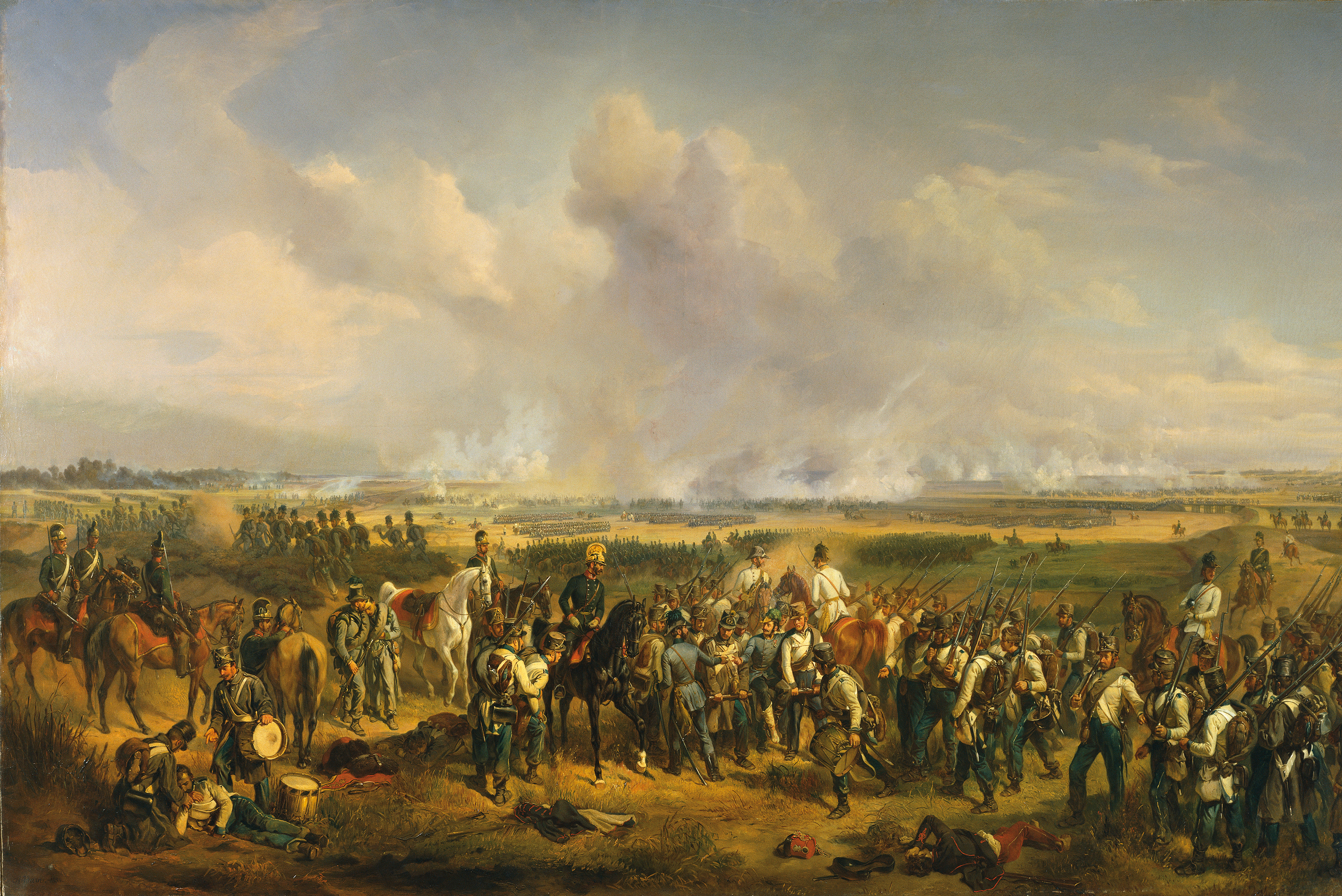
Date	5 August 1849
Location	near Szőreg, Szeged, Torontál County, Kingdom of Hungary
Result	Austrian & Russian victory

Belligerents
Hungarian Revolutionary Army; Polish Legion; Italian legion	Austrian Empire; Russian Empire

Commanders and leaders
Henryk Dembiński; Arisztid Dessewffy; György Kmety	Julius Jacob von Haynau; Ludwig von Benedek (WIA); Feodor Sergeyevich Panyutyin

Strength
Total: 38,672 + ? men: IV. corps: 12,044 + ?; IX. corps: 8,483; X. corps: 13,752; Polish Legion: 1,943; Cavalry division: 2,450; 112 (103) cannons	Total: 46,000 men: I. corps of Franz Schlik; III. corps of Georg Ramberg; IV. (Reserve) corps of Franz Liechtenstein; Cavalry division of Philipp Bechtold; 9. combined Russian division of Fyodor Panyutyin; Other units 284 cannons

Casualties and losses
Total: 640–740 men: 440 dead; 200–300 missing and captured; cannons	Total: 216 men: 46 dead; 170 wounded; 1 missing or captured

The Battle of Szőreg was a battle in the Hungarian Revolution of 1848, fought on 5 August 1849 at Szőreg, Hungary, fought between the Hungarian Revolutionary Army led by Lieutenant General Henryk Dembiński and the main army of the Habsburg Empire led by Field Marshal Julius Jacob von Haynau. The Austrian army was pressing on Szeged, a well fortified city from Southern Hungary. Dembiński decided to leave the fortifications and retreat to Szőreg near the Tisza river, where he placed many artillery batteries in the place named Kamaratöltés, preventing the frontal attack of Haynau's troops. The Austrian commander's response was sending his cavalry to cross the Tisza and flank the Hungarian troops. The cavalry managed to cross the river between Törökkanizsa and Makó, then engaged with the Hungarian cavalry in a huge battle around and in Szőreg, in which Dembiński himself was wounded, and the Hungarians safely retreated.

== Background ==
Starting with June, Hungary's Governor-President Lajos Kossuth's plan was to concentrate the Hungarian troops in southern Hungary, around Szeged, which created a conflict between him and the Hungarian main commander and minister of war Artúr Görgei, who wanted to stop the Austrian armies at Komárom. The result was that Kossuth deposed Görgei from the ministership, allowing him though to lead the Army of the Upper Danube to the concentration point at Szeged. Kossuth's order of concentrating around Szeged was followed by other Hungarian troops too: after securing the region of Bácska with his victory from 14 July in the Battle of Kishegyes, General Richard Guyon arrived there with the IV. corps, joining with the Army of the Middle Tisza of General Mór Perczel and the units of the Reserve Corps, concentrating there 48,000 soldiers. Szeged and its environs were protected by a wide, but not totally finished system of fortifications. In addition to this, the region from Orsova to the Tisza-Danube confluence, was protected by the 7000 soldiers of Colonel József Kollmann, the left bank of the Lower Tisza was guarded by the 7000 men strong troops of Major General György Kmety and the 5000 soldiers of Colonel Lajos Bene. The Austrian held fortress of Temesvár was encircled by the 9300 soldiers of Major General Károly Vécsey, and the fortress of Arad was held by a 1500 strong Hungarian garrison. So the province of Bánság was held by around 78,000 Hungarian soldiers.

After his victory at the Third Battle of Komárom from 11 July, Field Marshal Julius Jacob von Haynau, on 16 July marched from Komárom towards Budapest. Initially he left two corps (28,000 soldiers, 114 cannons) at Komárom, but shortly after that he ordered to one of them (I. corps led by General Franz Schlik) to march to Budapest, and join his troops. As a result, between 21 and 24 July, Haynau marched towards Szeged with 46,000 soldiers and 284 cannons. Haynau learned that Görgei was prevented from marching towards Szeged through the Danube–Tisza Interfluve by the Russian army in the Second Battle of Vác, and had to head towards northwest, followed by the Russian main army. This created for him the opportunity to defeat the Hungarians from around Szeged by himself. For this plan he needed all the troops at his disposal, and because of this, despite the fact that he promised to do so, he did not fulfil the Russians request of sending one of his corps to Szolnok to prevent an eventual crossing of Görgei's troops to the left bank of the Tisza. Another cause of his advance towards Szeged was the defeat of Lieutenant General Josip Jelačić in the Battle of Kishegyes, which threatened total Hungarian occupation of southern Hungary east from the Danube, and he was also concerned about the situation of the Austrian garrison of Temesvár, besieged by the Hungarians.

The troops of Haynau marched in three columns through the Danube–Tisza Interfluve towards Szeged. The main column under the personal leadership of Haynau (the Reserve Corps, the Panyutyin-division, the Bechtold cavalry division), followed the Pest - Kecskemét - Szeged road, the left wing consisting of the I. corps of General Schlik marched on the rout through Cegléd – Nagykőrös – Tiszaalpár – Szentes – Hódmezővásárhely – Makó, and finally the right wing under Lieutenant field marshal Georg Heinrich von Ramberg went through Soltvadkert – Kiskunhalas – Szabadka towards Törökkanizsa.

Haynau's plan was to force the Hungarians to retreat from the fortifications around Szeged by crossing, on 4 August, with his left wing the Maros, and with his right wing the Tisza rivers. But behind the fortifications from Szeged the Hungarians were in an advantageous central position, being able from there to attack the separated Austrian columns. This opportunity was not sensed by the commander Lieutenant General Henryk Dembiński, designated on 30 July for this position after his predecessor Lieutenant General Lázár Mészáros resigned. He took an inexplicable decision to withdraw from the fortifications of Szeged, retreating on the left bank of the Tisza. Dembiński's decision caused outrage among the Hungarian officers: hearing about this decision, Lieutenant General Antal Vetter resigned of the commandement of the Hungarian troops from Southern Hungary. The position could have been defended. However, Dembiński did not wanted to engage Haynau, and he retreated further East behind the dike from Szőreg which was connecting the Tisza and the Maros, leaving only a couple of cannons and several hundreds of soldiers in the bridgehead from Újszeged (New Szeged).

When Kossuth heard about these decisions of Dembiński, and fearing similar actions, he immediately sent an envoy in Transylvania to Lieutenant General Józef Bem, to come to Szeged and take over the high commandment from Dembiński. At the same time he ordered Dembiński to lead the army in forced march to Arad, he ordered to the commander of the siege corps of Temesvár, Major General Károly Vécsey as well to march with his forces to Arad, sending a couple of infantry battalions and hussar companies ahead, to help to defend Arad, threatened by an Austrian corps. In this way Kossuth hoped to gather 80,000 soldiers.

== Prelude ==
At Szőreg, on the northern side of the dike connecting the Maros and Tisza, Dembiński ordered the digging of a 1,2 km long trench, in which he placed 50 cannons, which had the mission to stop the advance of the imperial troops. This section was defended by the IX. corps, the Polish Legion and a division of the X. corps. In order to stop Schlik's I. corps crossing of the Maros river, at Makó stood the division of the X. corps led by János Lenkey, while at Gyála the IV. corps of Richard Guyon and the Italian Legion of Colonel Alessandro Monti had the duty to prevent the crossing of the Tisza by the III. corps led by Lieutenant field marshal Georg Heinrich von Ramberg.

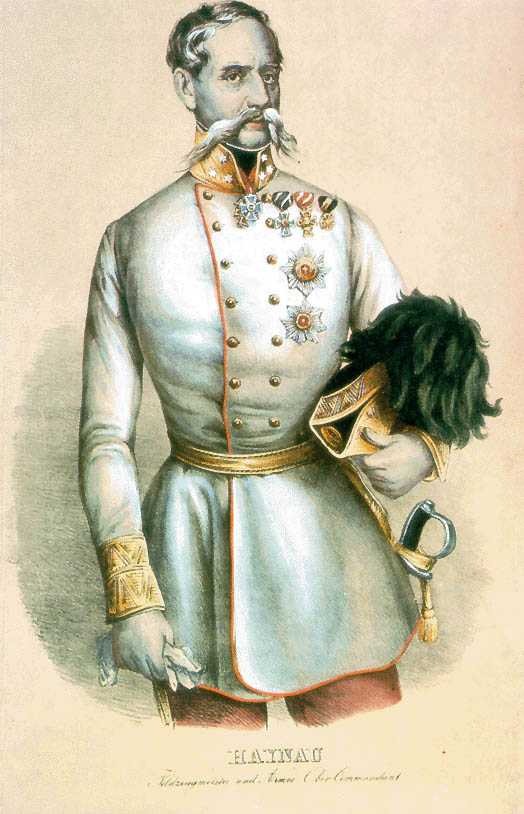
Julius J. von Haynau

Haynau learned about the retreat of the Hungarian troops from their advantageous defensive position from Szeged at 2 August. He sent immediately two of his brigades to occupy it, then in the next day he established there his headquarters. From here he sent the Bechtold cavalry division to Martonos to cross the Tisza there, while he, together with the Reserve corps and the Panyutyin-division started the crossing of Tisza at Újszeged. Haynau gave the task of crossing first the Tisza, to build a bridge on the river, and to secure the bridgehead to two brigades of the Reserve corps and a Russian Jäger. The commander of the Reserve corps Lieutenant General Prince Franz de Paula of Liechtenstein ordered an extensive artillery preparation to ease the job of his units. The four cannons of First Lieutenant Zsigmond Szijjártó tried to withstand to the six time more numerous Austrian artillery, but when the Russian cannons joined the fight and caught the Hungarians in a crossfire, they were forced to retreat. Then, from a place North from szeged two Austrian battalions crossed the Tisza on barges to Újszeged, while the brigade of General Ludwig von Benedek crossed the river between the Szeged castle and the bridgehead, and built a bridge. The Benedek brigade pushed the Hungarian units out of Újszeged, but these dig themselves in the trenches south and east to the locality, and only with the help of the newly arrived Austrian battalions which crossed the Tisza north from Szeged managed Benedek to force them to retreat behind the dike from Szőreg. During these fights, Dembiński remained totally inactive, despite the fact that his subalterns, like Lieutenant Colonel Vilmos Lázár, begged him to attack the not yet fully deployed Austrians, which could easily drive the enemy back, taking back Újszeged, and push a part of the Austrian troops into the Tisza river. Dembiński gave, only after the darkness installed, the order of an uncoordinated attack to merely 4 battalions, and these scattered units lost their way, which forced them to retreat. In that day the Hungarians lost at Újszeged 70 dead, the Austrians lost 4 dead and 19 wounded, while the Russians 3 wounded soldiers.

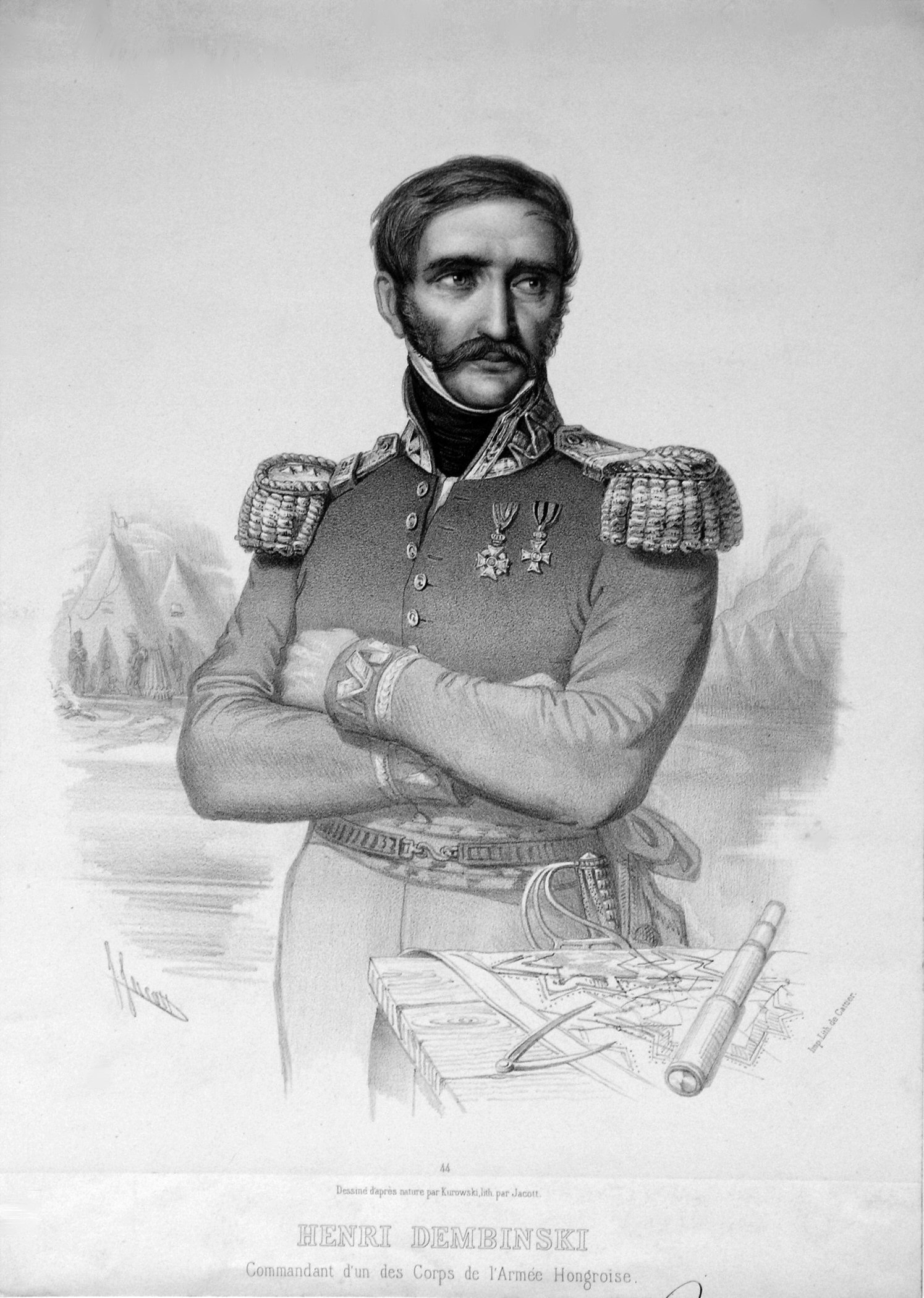
Henryk Dembinski

In the night from 3 to 4 August the Austrians finished the bridges, as a result of which their troops from Szeged could cross the river to Újszeged, then they deployed behind its trenches. The day of 4 August passed peacefully around Szőreg and Újszeged, although Haynau initially wanted to start the decisive attack at that day, but then renounced to it, because he waited for Schlik's and Ramberg's encircling corps to finish their crossings, and to arrive in the vicinity, to influence the future battle. His plan was to encircle from south with his cavalry the Hungarian army, and to sweep them up. The only Austrian combat arms which was active on 4 August, was the artillery, which continued to shoot at the Hungarian positions the whole day, responding to the Hungarian artilleries shootings, which started 7.00 a.m. Dembiński, considering the Austrian artilleries response quite weak, he concluded that the Austrians will not start a decisive attack that day, so he continued to make plans to retreat further eastwards.

In the meanwhile the left and right wings of Haynau's army also approached to their objectives. The I. corps led by General Franz Schlik arrived to the Tisza river on 31 July at Tiszaalpár, then on the next day they crossed unhindered the river, and at Kunszentmárton also the Körös. On 2 August they reached Szentes, and on the 3. Hódmezővásárhely, then on the 4. they marched towards the Maros, in order to cross the river at Makó. At Gajdos Schlik's corps found the rearguard of the Hungarian X. corps's Lenkey division. The 1 infantry battalion, 1 Hussar company and 3 cannons strong Hungarian detachment under the leadership of Major Sándor Szerdahelyi managed to hold back the Austrian corps, until the Lenkey division crossed the Maros, then, dismantling the bridge, retreated on the left bank of the river. Then the Lenkey division retreated to Zombor, where they took position. Schlik occupied Makó, Apátfalva and Magyarcsanád, and started to rebuild the bridge over the Maros river, finishing it only on 6 August.

The III. corps led by Lieutenant General Ramberg entered in Szabadka on 30 July, then on 2 August in Magyarkanizsa, and started to prepare the crossing of the Tisza. But in the afternoon a strong detachment of the IV. corps of Guyon arrived in Törökkanizsa from the opposite shore of the Tisza. Ramberg tried to build a bridge further upstream, but on 3 August around the midnight Haynau ordered him to march towards Horgos, because he heard a rumour that the Hungarians crossed on the right bank of the Tisza, and want to attack his troops from the side. Ramberg prepared for the departure, even sending one of his brigades to march towards Horgos, but on 4 August Haynau sent him another order to remain at Magyarkanizsa, and to try again to cross the river.

On 5 July at dawn the troops of Ramberg started to cross the Tisza, chasing away the one battalion and 3 cannons strong Hungarian detachment from the other side, capturing the cannons, then repulsed the two Hungarian battalions attacking from the direction of Törökkanizsa. A part of the Hungarians retreated to Ráckeresztúr and Gyála the other part through Törökkanizsa towards Oroszlámos, the first group being chased by the smaller, the second by the larger part of Rambergs corps. During the fights around Magyarkanizsa and Törökkanizsa the Hungarians lost around 60 dead and 100 men, while the Austrians lost 3 dead, 25 wounded and 1 missing or captured soldiers. By crossing the river, Ramberg circumvent from the left the Hungarian positions from Szőreg.

On 5 August the IV. Hungarian corps was holding Szentiván, the IX. corps and the Polish Legion stationed at Szőreg, the X. corps at Deszk, the Szerdahelyi detachment was at the dike from Zombor, facing Makó. Hearing that Schlik arrived to Makó, Dembiński wanted to retreat from Szőreg that evening. Believing that a 16,000-20,000 strong enemy corps crossed the Tisza at Csongrád, threatening Arad, and controlling the crossings of the Maros river, eh wrote at 9.30 a.m. a letter to Kmety, in which he informed him, that he wants to retreat on that day to Óbéba and on 6 August to Óbesenyő, then on 7. to Nagykikinda, and ordered him to move towards Nagykikinda, to join on 7 August with him. Dembiński's letter shows that he disregarded Kossuth's aforementioned order to move towards East to Arad to join his forces with Görgei, but he chose to move southwards. But, as shown before, he thought that Haynau will not attack that day, so he waited for the evening. But Haynau's attack at that afternoon derailed his plans.

When he heard about Ramberg's crossing of the Tisza, Dembiński gave the order to his subalterns to retreat from the right wing towards the left, towards Óbéba. With this decision he gave up the way to Arad without being forced by the enemy to do so. Although the retreat initially was postponed twice, at 3 p.m. the X. corps led by Colonel László Gál and the Polish Legion started to retreat, pulling back also the heavy artillery from the left wing.

=== Opposing forces ===
The Hungarian army:

- IV. Corps: 86 infantry companies, 23 cavalry companies (2241+? horses with saddle), 60 (54) cannons (? horses for traction) = 12,044 +? soldiers;
- IX. Corps: 46 infantry companies, 1 cavalry company (172 horses with saddle), 20 cannons (229 horses for traction) = 8483 +? soldiers;
- X. Corps: 73 infantry companies, 2 1/2 cavalry companies (248 horses with saddle), 16 (13) cannons (157 horses for traction) = 13,752 soldiers;
- Polish Legion: 18 infantry companies, 4 cannons (57 horses for traction) = 1943 soldiers;
- Cavalry division: 17 cavalry companies (2291 horses with saddle), 12 cannons (192 horses for traction) = 2450 soldiers;

Total: 223 infantry companies, 43 1/2 cavalry company (4952+? horses with saddle), 112 (103) cannons (635 horses for traction) = 38,672 +? soldiers.

The Austrian army:

- I. Corps: 93 infantry companies, 14 cavalry companies (2241 horses), 48 cannons = 14,414 soldiers;
- III. Corps: 73 infantry companies, 13 cavalry companies, 42 cannons = ? soldiers;
- IV. (Reserve) Corps: 93 infantry companies, 8 cavalry companies, 54 cannons = ? soldiers;
- Cavalry Division: 30 cavalry companies, 12 cannons = ? soldiers;
- Russian division: 64 infantry companies, 48 cannons = ? soldiers;
- Additional units: 7 infantry companies, 76 cannons = ? soldiers;

Total: 330 infantry companies, 65 cavalry companies, 280 cannons = ? soldiers.

== Battle ==
Before the fights started, Haynau sent Lieutenant General Liechtenstein in reconnaissance. The latter informed the commander that the Hungarians are still behind the dike from Szőreg, in battle formations.

In the afternoon of 5 August Haynau started to deploy all the troops at his disposal, consisting of 25,000 soldiers and 160 cannons, in the bridgehead from Újszeged, face to face the Hungarian army positioned behind the dike from Szőreg. Haynau positioned his troops in front of Szőreg as it follows: in the first line was the Lobkowitz division of the IV. corps, with the Benedek brigade on the left side of the road to Arad, while the Jablonowski brigade was on its right side, in the second line was the Herzinger division of the same corps, while in the third line he sent Panyutyin's Russian division. The artillery reserve, protected by the Auersperg cuirassier regiment was deployed right from the Jablonowski brigade. He did not wanted to cause unnecessary losses to his troops with a frontal attack, so he sent the 22 companies and 3 batteries strong Bechtold cavalry division, from the southeastern end of the Úszeged bridgehead, to circumvent the Hungarian left wing.

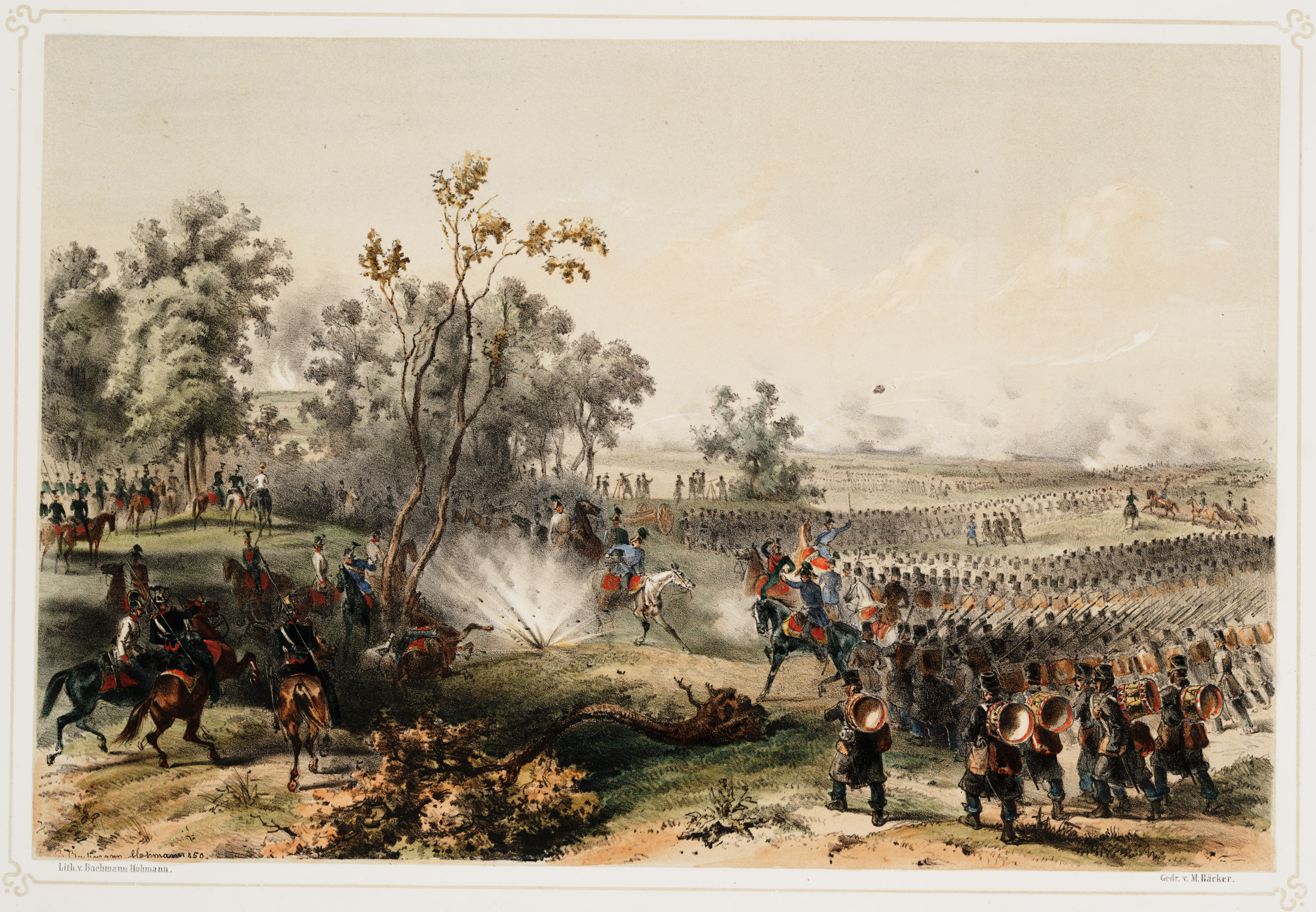
B. Bachmann-Hohmannː Battle of Szőreg (called by Austrians battle of Szeged), 5 August 1849

To support this action Haynau sent 3 Russian jäger battalions of the Panyutyin division supported by 2 cavalry companies and 2 Austrian Congreve rocket batteries, to occupy the woods from Szentiván, and sent 6 Russian cannons on the right bank of the Tisza, facing the forest. The Russian battalions accomplished their task without entering in serious fight with the two Hungarian battalions of the IV. corps, which stationed there, because the latters retreated. The 2 cavalry companies and 2 rocket batteries which were supporting the Russian detachment took position in front of the forest, facing Szőreg and Szentiván.

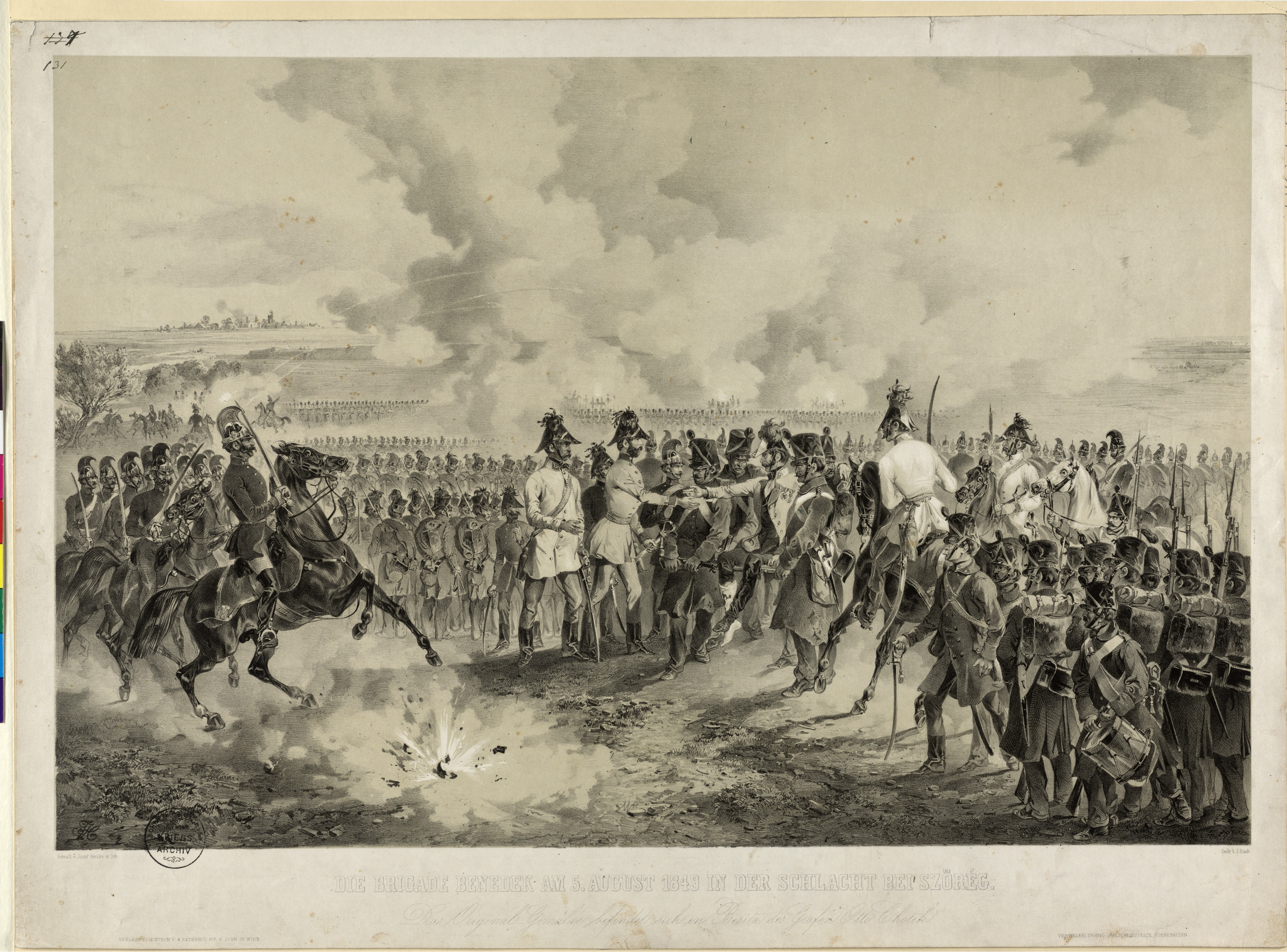
The wounding of Ludwig von Benedek on 5. August 1849 in the Battle of Szőreg

In the meanwhile the Austrian cavalry division of Bechtold, after inexplicably delaying an hour in the bridgehead from Újszőny, finally started its action, repulsing with the Imperial uhlans and a battery the weak attack of the a couple companies of Hungarian hussars of the vanguard of the Hungarian cavalry led by General Arisztid Dessewffy (who, at the beginning of the battle, was sent by Dembiński behind the Hungarian left wing, and if its possible, to cross the dike, and encircle the right wing of the Austrian artillery line), then, finding the dike from Szőreg too high to climb, they tried with their artillery and sappers to open holes and breaches on it.

At 5,30 p.m. Haynau, who was waiting in vain for Bechtold to accomplish his task quicker (because of this he later removed his cavalry commander from his position), loss his temper, and decided to attack the Hungarians from Szőreg from the front. He positioned the artillery of the IV. corps, and the main artillery reserve to their right wing, facing Dembiński's artillery, to 700-1000 paces distance from the dike in semicircular position. This was a risky decision, and if Dembiński would have sent his cavalry against the unprotected 99 Austrian cannons, especially on those from the Austrian firing lines left wing, or if he would have attacked at the right moment the attacking Austrian infantry, he could cause great troubles to the Austrians.

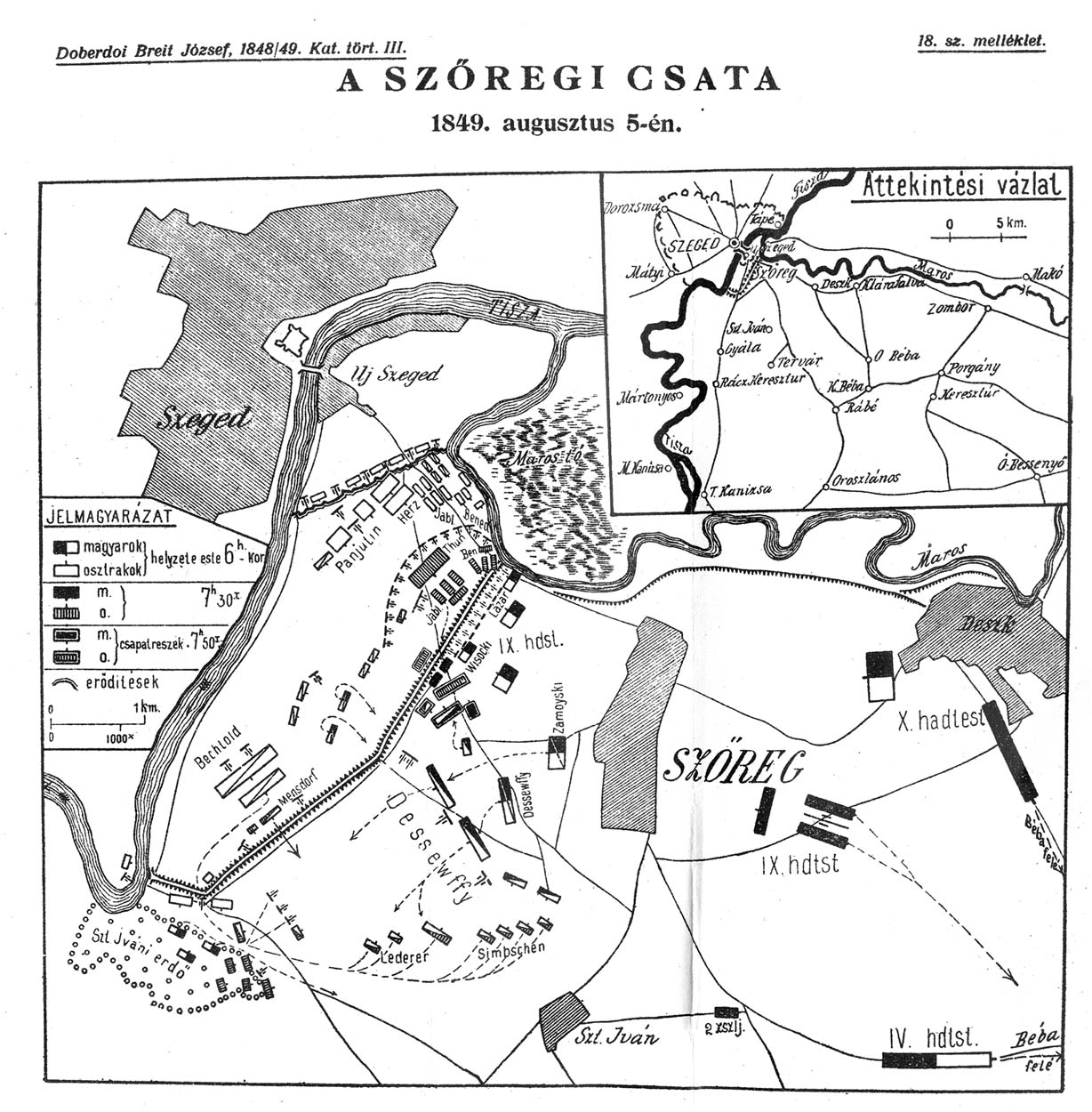
Map of the Battle of Szőreg (5 August 1849)

But he remained inactive. Instead of this, Dembiński was thinking about how to retreat his troops. While the IV. corps led by General Guyon was already marching towards South, after an hour and a half of fighting, he started to pull them out one by one, and send them to Óbéba, leaving his troops without artillery support, and because he sent away also the ammunition, the Hungarian cannons, positioned on the dike, which were anyway inferior to the Austrian ones regarding their number and calibre, now remained without ammunition. The task of covering the retreat was given to the cavalry of General Arisztid Dessewffy. Profiting from Dembiński's surprising decisions, the infantry of the Austrian reserve corps, started its deployment unhindered for a decisive attack. Lieutenant General Franz Liechtenstein with the infantry organized from left to right in echelon formation, with the Benedek brigade on the left wing along the bank of the Maros, followed on his right slightly behind the Jablonowski brigade, more to the right by the Herzinger division organized in two lines, finally more to the right by a brigade of the Panyutyin division, while the 5 battalions and 18 cannons of its other brigade remained behind to take over the bridgehead. Seeing that the Hungarian artillery is about to completely cease to fire, and believing that the infantry is about to retreat, Liechtenstein gave order to the two brigades from the front to charge. Initially the units of the IX. corps led by Lieutenant Colonel Vilmos Lázár pushed them down from the dike. During this charge Lieutenant General Ludwig von Benedek, the commander of a brigade of the reserve corps, was wounded, being replaced by Colonel Siegenthal, who climbed with his soldiers on the dike, finding there no enemy soldiers, but the Jablonowski brigade and the Thun brigade which followed them, met Hungarian resistance.

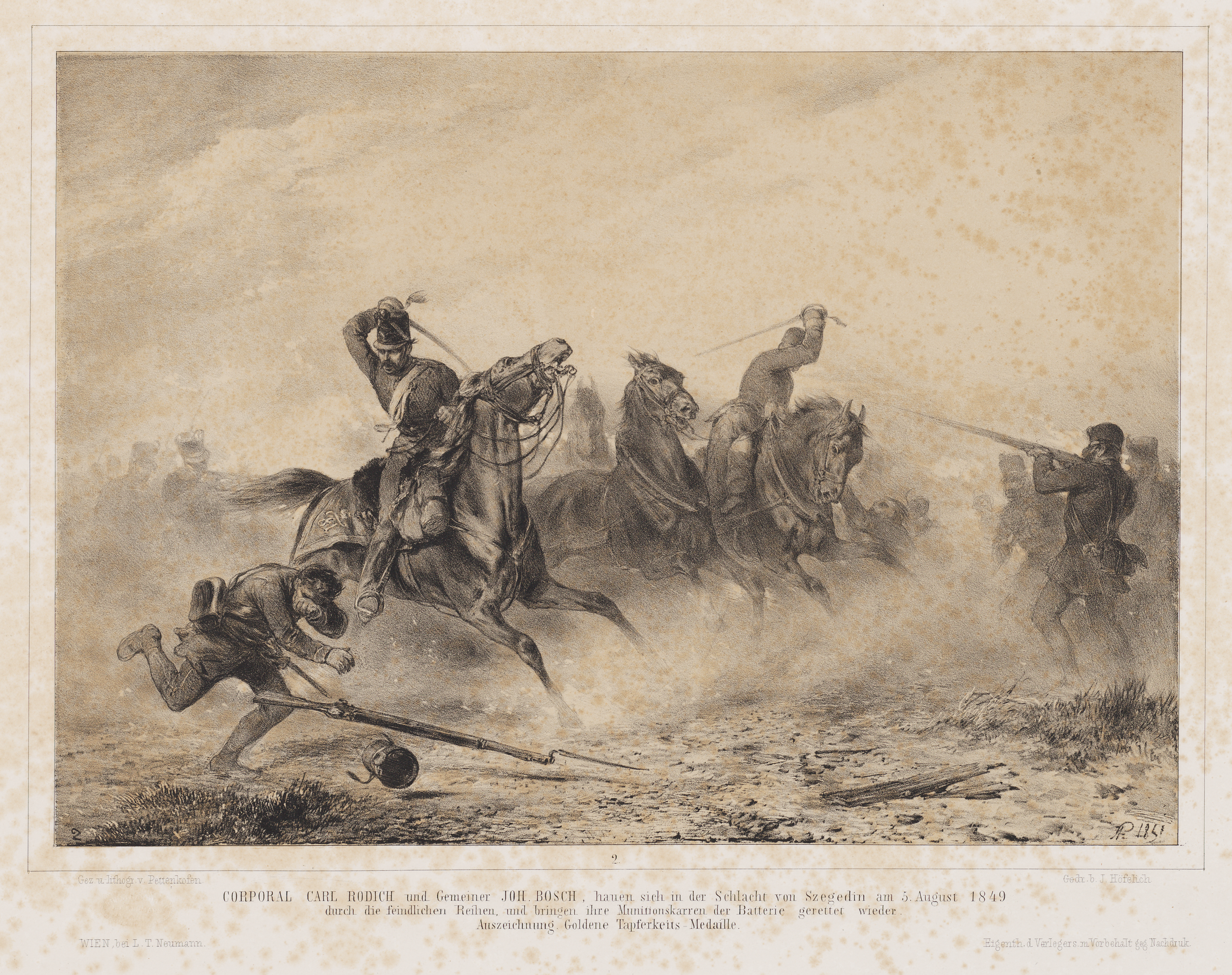
August Xaver Karl von Pettenkofen - Scene from the battle of Szőreg (05.08.1849)

Some battalions and a battery of the division led by General Józef Wysocki was ordered to hold back the Austrians on the dike until the retreating artillery and the infantry were far away from Szőreg. So when the Jablonowski brigade climbed the dike, they were pushed back by the counterattack of these Hungarian battalions. Despite the initial Hungarian successes, the Austrian superiority started to prevail, and the Hungarian infantry, remained without artillery support, was forced to give up the line of the dike, and if Colonel Władisław Zamoyski would have not sent some cavalry companies to their help, the handful of Hungarian soldiers would have been all killed. In the end, thanks to the cavalry support they lost only one cannon and two ammunition wagons.

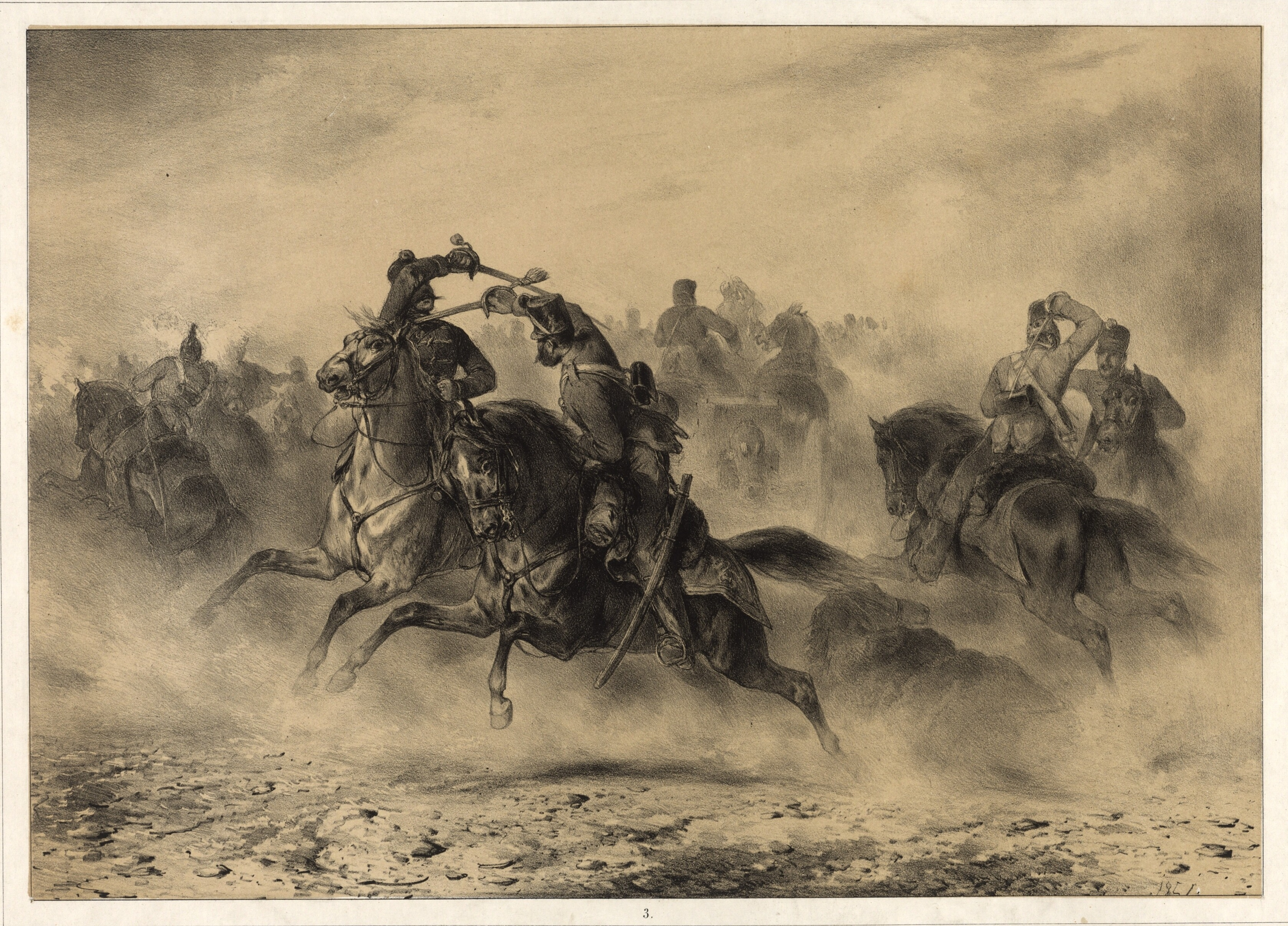
August Xaver Karl von Pettenkofenː Cavalry battle in the battle of Szőreg (05.08.1849)

During these events the Hungarian IV. corps too started to retreat from Törökkanizsa.

Only around these events, after a long delaying, the Bechtold's Austrian cavalry division decided to climb the dike, and the Imperial Uhlans led by General Karl von Simbschen headed towards Szentiván, followed slightly to left by the Lederer cavalry brigade, and around 1000 paces behind, in front of the szentiván forest the 21/2 battery took position, while 4 companies of Liechtenstein chevau-légers with a half battery, joined also by a Russian infantry battalion and an Austrian rocket battery remained behind the dike in order to cover an eventual retreat of the Bechtold division. Against them General Arisztid Dessewffy deployed the Hungarian cavalry between the southeastern end of Szőreg and the dike, facing the Szentiván woods. Simbschen's units attacked the left wing of the Hungarian cavalry, pushing back the weak units from here, but the Hungarian batteries prevented them to advance further. In the meanwhile the other units of the Hungarian cavalry line attacked the Lederer brigade, while the Austrian batteries positioned in their back towards left, were attacked by the Bocskay Hussars, being in danger to be captured. But to their luck, the Lichtenstein chevau-légers came to their rescue, after they quickly crossed the dike and appeared on the Bocskay Hussars left wing, while the Jablonowski brigade and the Austrian batteries, also crossed the dike and entered in fight with the hussars, forcing them to retreat. But the fight was not over, and the Hungarian Hussars and Polish cavalrymen under the lead of Major General Arisztid Dessewffy and Colonel Władisław Zamoyski beat back several times Bechtold's Austrian cavalry, and the Jablonowski brigade at Szőreg's Western edge, retreating to Óbéba only after Dembiński gave the order to the infantry to retreat, where the Hungarian army spent the night. The Hungarian artillery kept their positions to the last minute, and they retreated only when the Austrian infantry threatened them with capture.

The Bechtold division and the Benedek and Jablonovski brigades did not chase the Hungarian army because night approached.

== Battle maps ==
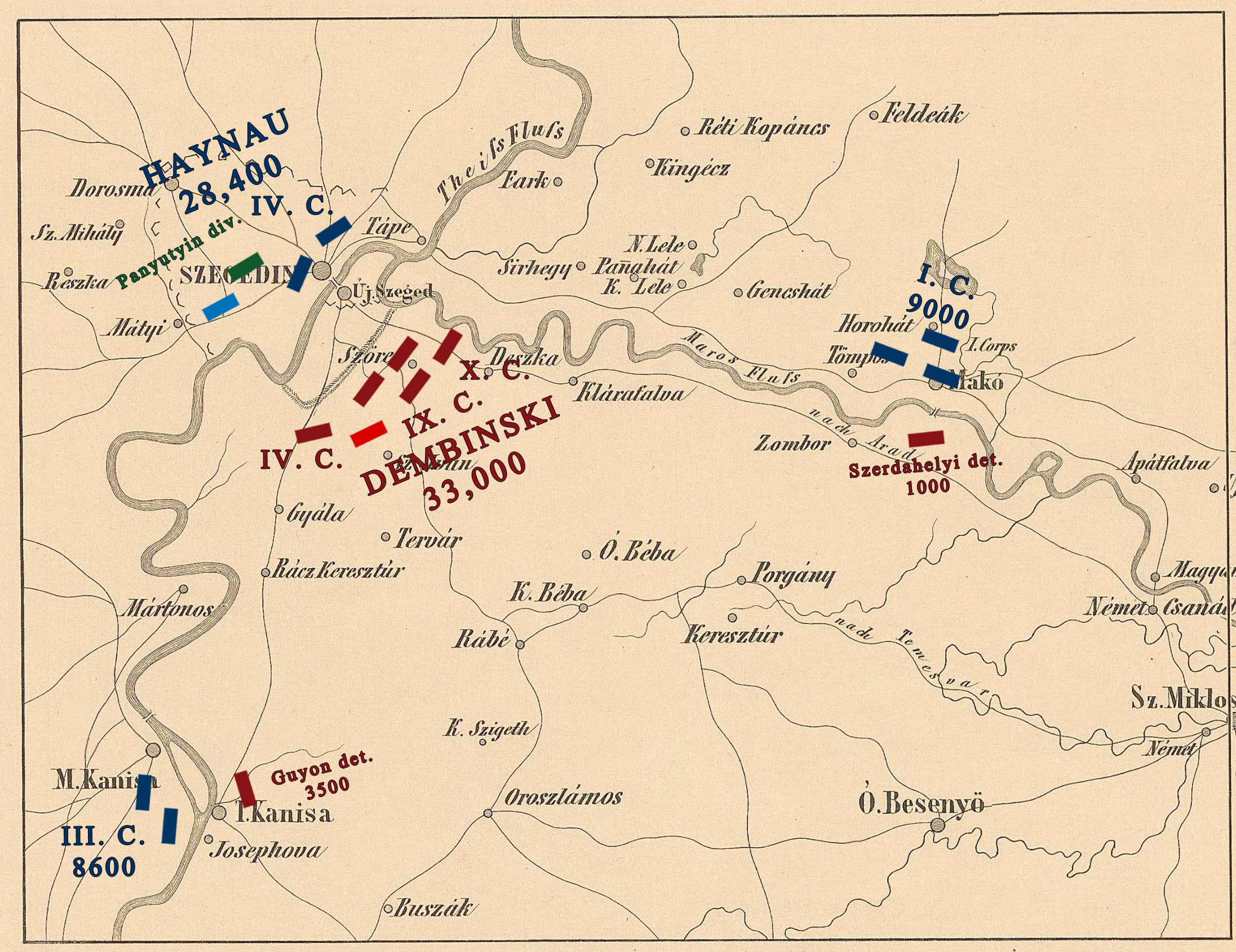
The Battle of Szőreg. The situation on the wider battlefield before the battle. Red - the Austrian troops, Blue - the Hungarian troops. Green - the Russian troops.

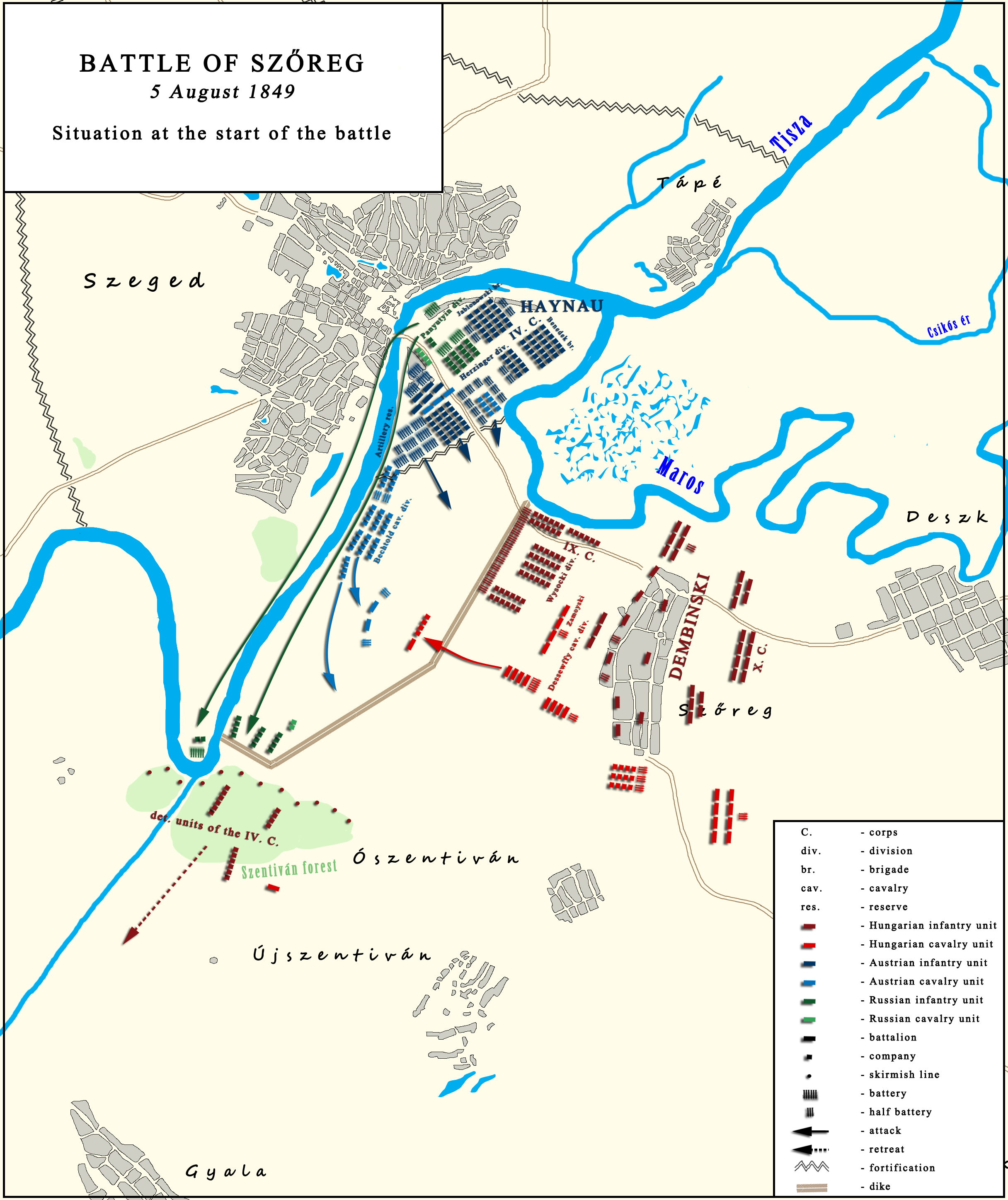
Battle of Szőreg. The start of the battle. Red - the Austrian troops, Blue - the Hungarian troops. Green - the Russian troops.

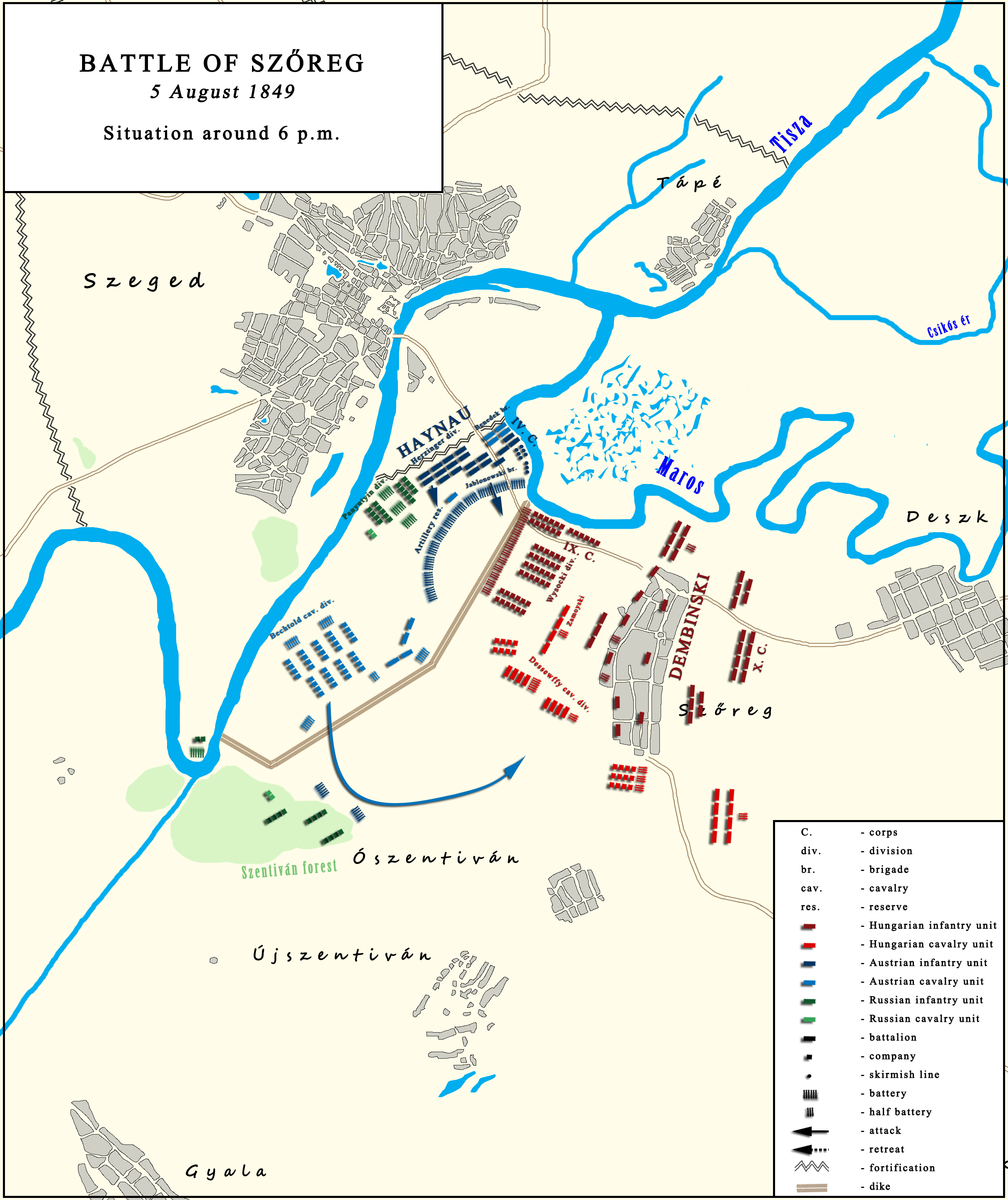
Battle of Szőreg. The situation around 6 p.m. Red - the Austrian troops, Blue - the Hungarian troops. Green - the Russian troops.

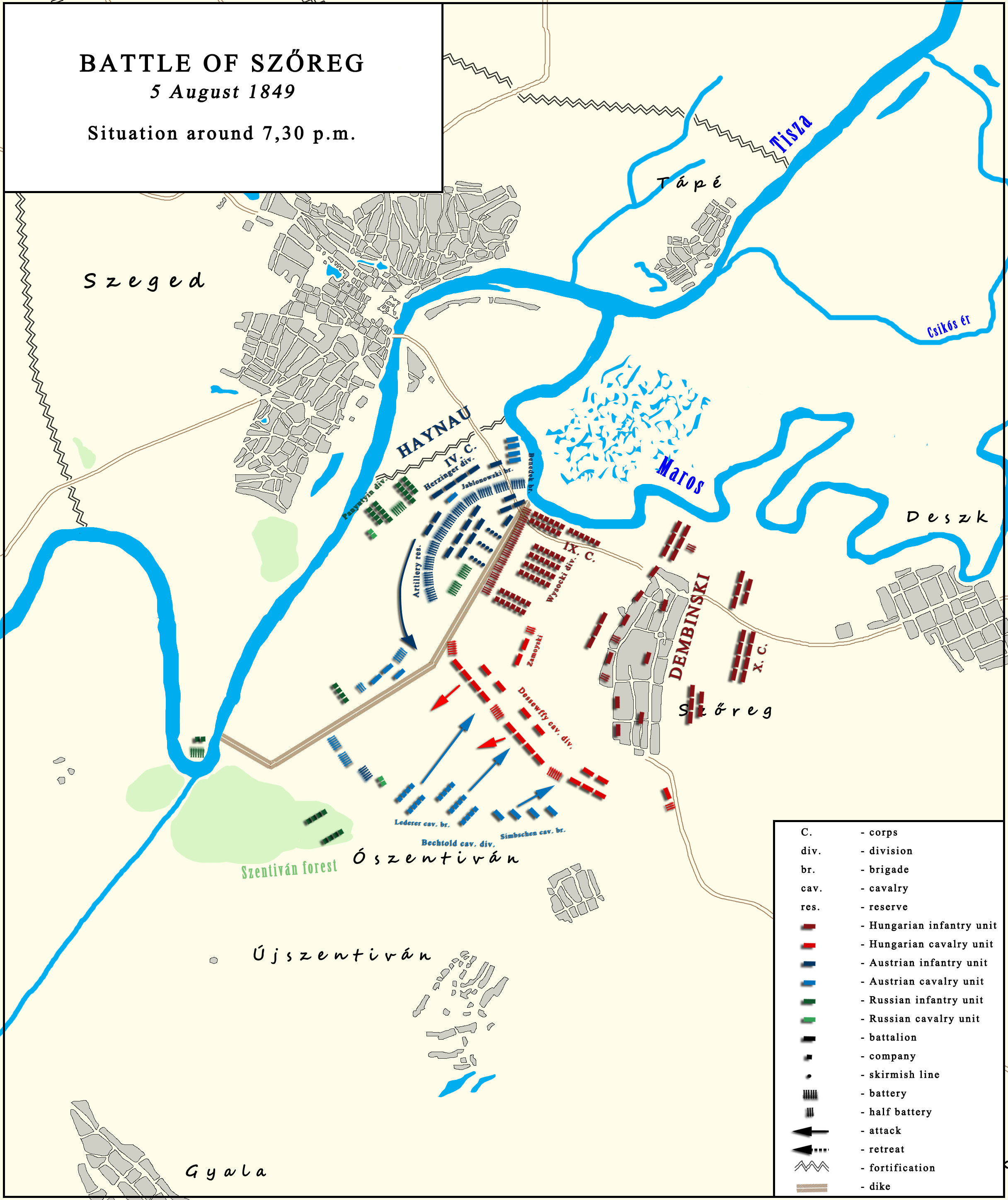
Battle of Szőreg. The situation around 7:30 p.m. Red - the Austrian troops, Blue - the Hungarian troops. Green - the Russian troops.

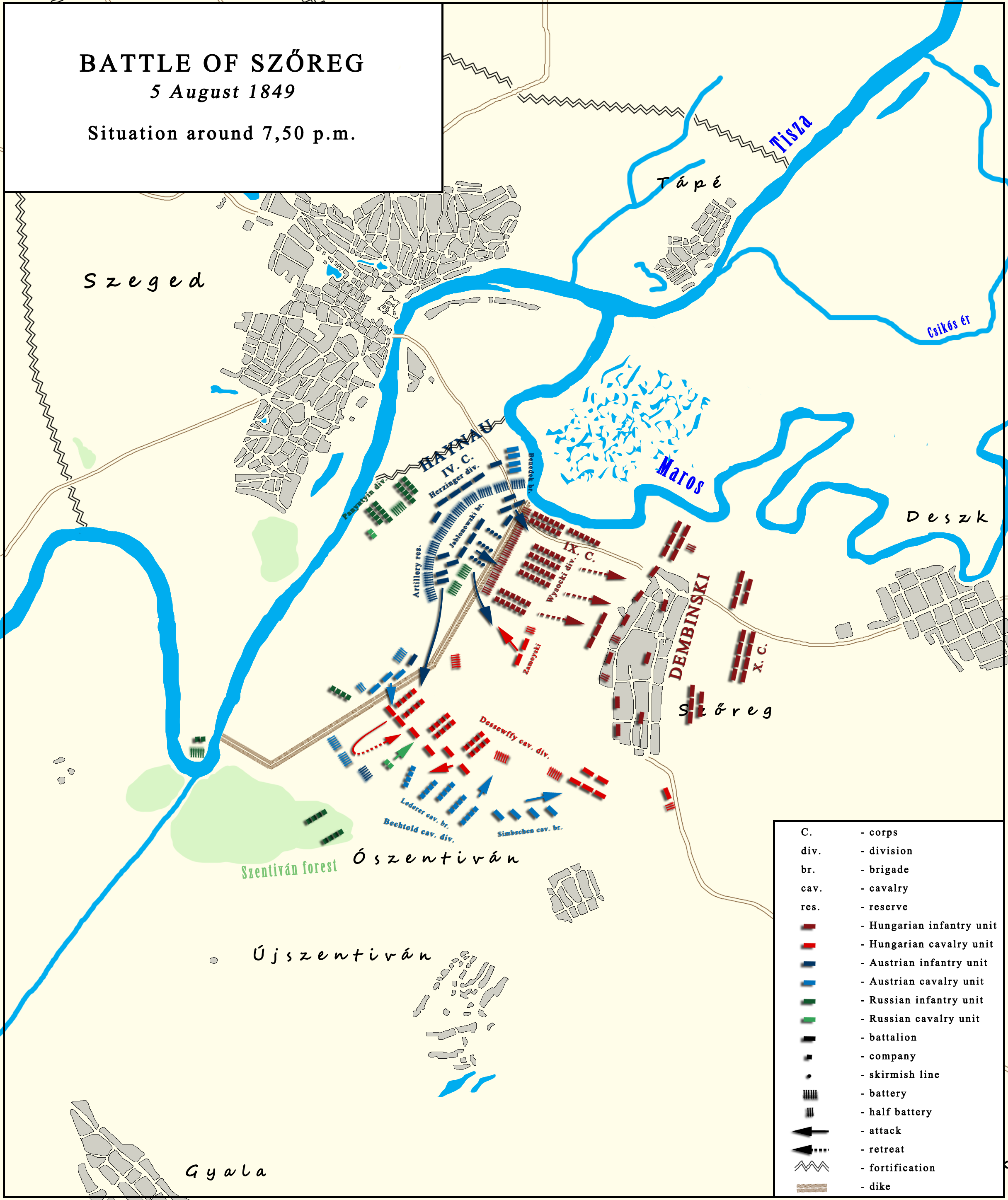
Battle of Szőreg. The situation around 7,50 p.m. Red - the Austrian troops, Blue - the Hungarian troops. Green - the Russian troops.

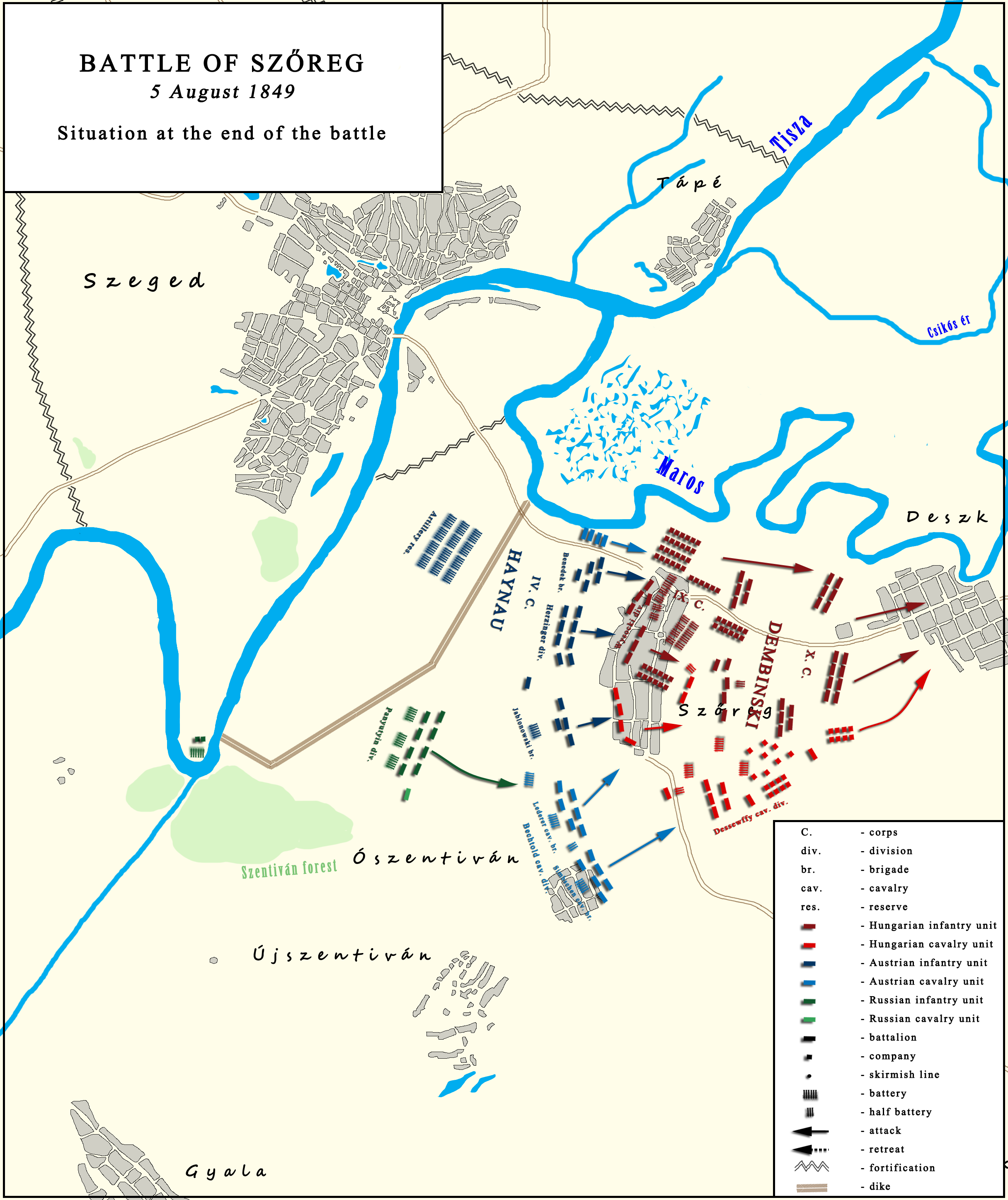
Battle of Szőreg. The end of the battle. Red - the Austrian troops, Blue - the Hungarian troops. Green - the Russian troops.

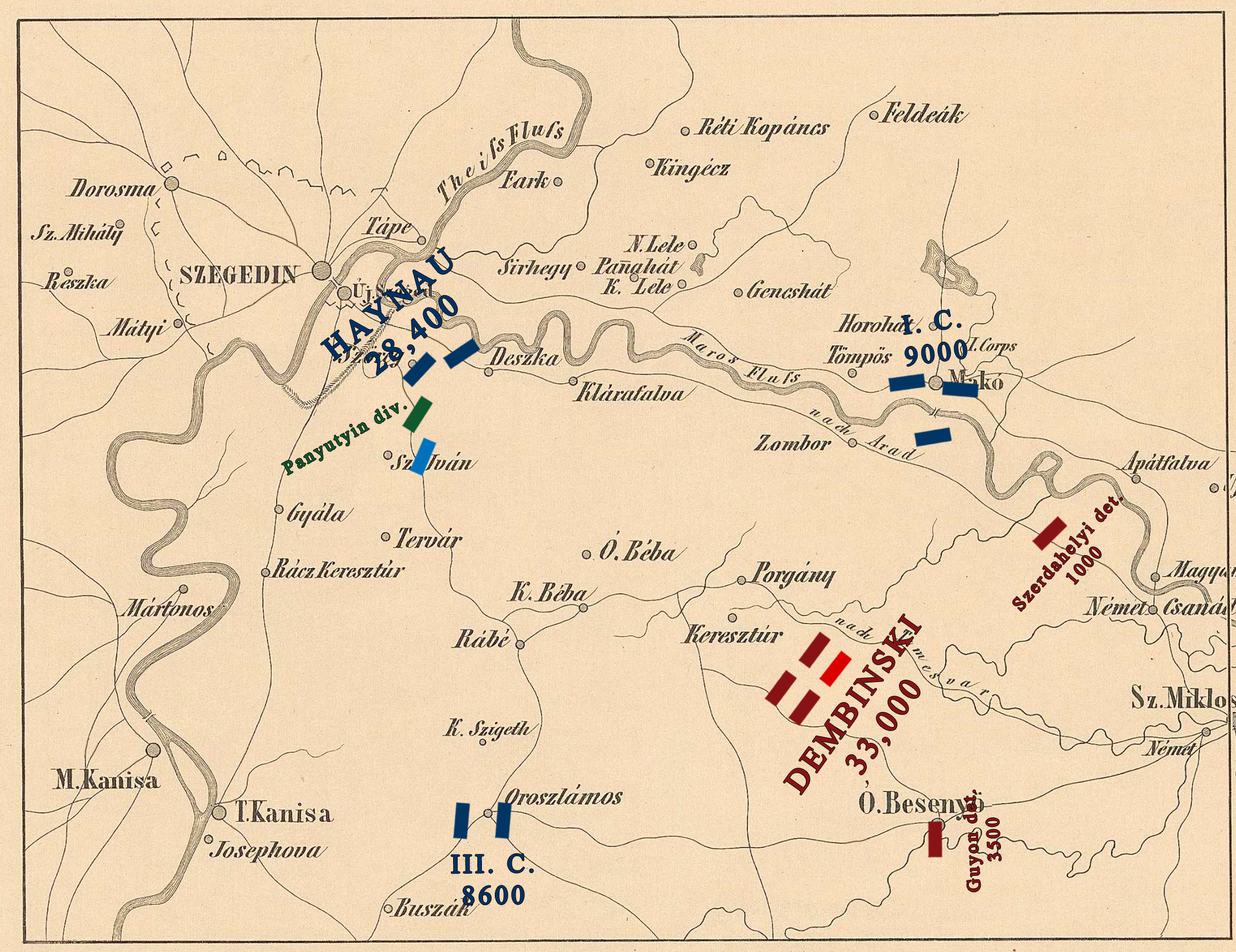
The Battle of Szőreg. The situation on the wider battlefield after the battle. Red - the Austrian troops, Blue - the Hungarian troops. Green - the Russian troops.

== Aftermath ==
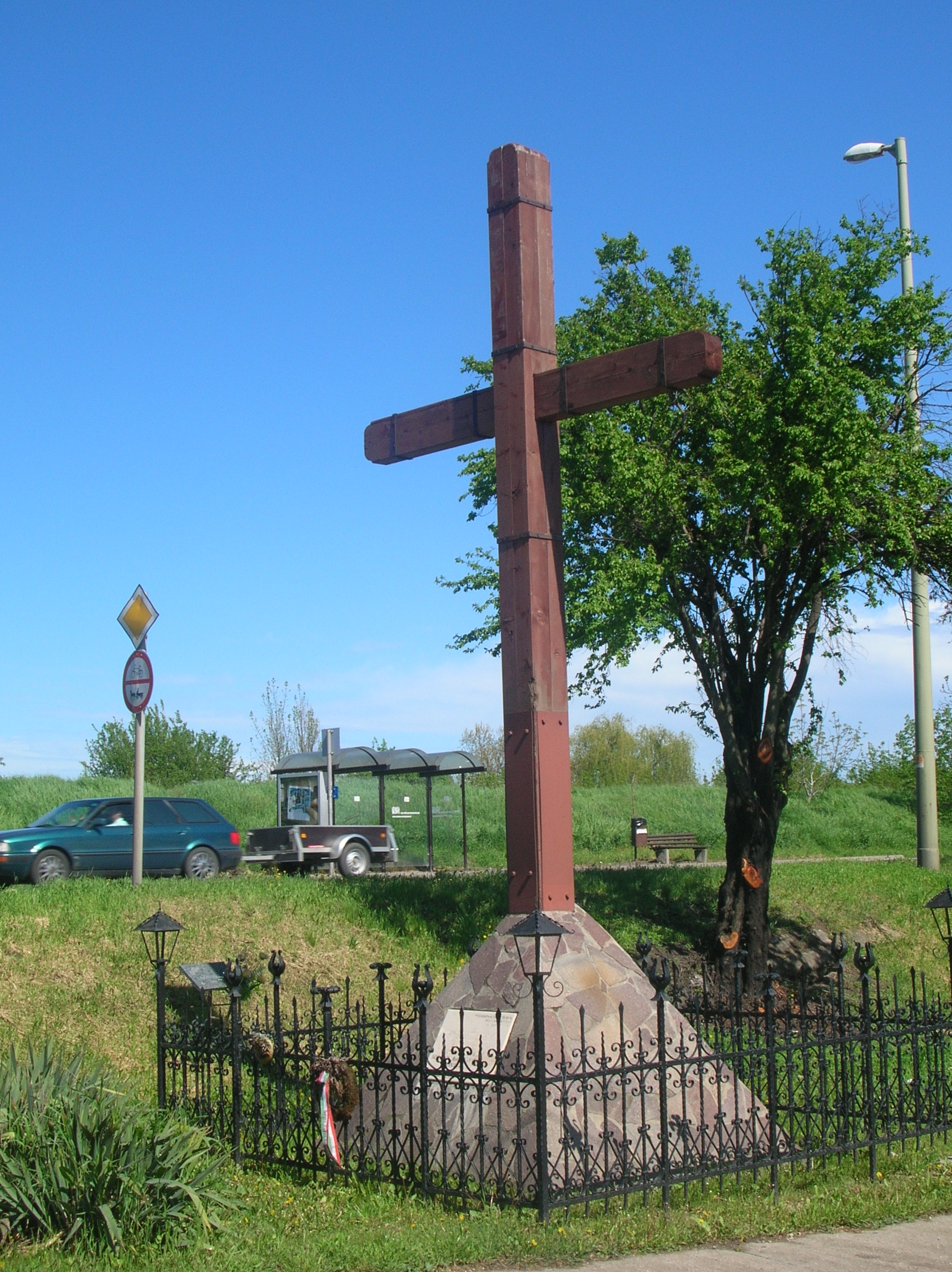
This cross of remembrance at Kamaratöltés erected on the 150th anniversary of the battle.

The Hungarian troops fought quite well, and if their commander had shown some initiative to lead his troops, Haynau's troops would have faced serious problems. Unfortunately, confused also by Kossuth's orders to retreat towards Arad, the Polish born Hungarian commander showed a disastrous leadership, which, as it was shown before, these started long before the battle. First he retreated his troops from the well defendable bridgehead from Újszeged, then he let Haynau to cross the Tisza unhindered, then on 4 August he did nothing to push back the Austrian troops after their crossing, then his failure to lead the Hungarian troops in the battle of Szőreg, in which with his hasty decisions, with his given then taken back retreat orders, with sending away the artillery ammunition, with his disparitions in the most important moments of the battle, he managed to maneuver his troops in a situation that it is a miracle that they escaped the annihilation. Dembiński was saved by the failure of Bechtold to encircle the Hungarian left wing, and to beat their cavalry, so he could retreat his troops in safety.

But his gravest mistake, which influenced the outcome of the whole Hungarian freedom war, was yet to come. After the battle instead of leading the Hungarian army following the line of the Maros upstream towards Arad, like Kossuth asked from him, where he could join his troops with the Army of the Upper Danube led by Artúr Görgei, he sent them towards south through Óbéba, Óbesenyő and Nagykikinda towards Temesvár. With this he enabled to Haynau's troops to join, and foiled the possibility to join his forces with Görgei's.

On the other hand, although Haynau by splitting his troops in three, while he marched from Pest to Szeged and the battle of Szőreg, he took an important risk, but this risk later only augmented his success. He probably understood from Dembiński's movements, that his opponent is not able to use the opportunities resulting from his decisions, and decided to take those risks for a greater success. Haynau won the battle even before this started, because Dembiński would have been forced to retreat from Szőreg even without Haynau's attack, thanks to the enveloping movements of Schlik's and Ramberg's two corps.

After the battle Haynau positioned his troops as it follows: the former Benedek brigade led now, because of its commanders wounding, by Major General Eduard Freiherr Bersina von Siegenthal was positioned between Szőreg and Deszk, the Herzinger division inside and behind Szőreg, the Panyutyin division south from Szőreg, the former Bechtold cavalry division led now, thanks to its commanders replacement because of Haynau's dissatisfaction towards his way of leadership during the battle, by Lieutenant Field Marshal Karl von Wallmoden-Gimborn pitched camp at Szentiván, establishing connection with the detachment of the III. corps from Ráckeresztúr. The bulk of the III. corps held Oroszlámos, while the I. corps remained at Makó.

== Sources ==
- Bánlaky, József (2001). A magyar nemzet hadtörténelme (The Military History of the Hungarian Nation) (in Hungarian). Budapest: Arcanum Adatbázis.
- Bona, Gábor (1996), Az 1848-49. évi szabadságharc története ("The history of the Hungarian Revolution of 1848-49") (in Hungarian), Budapest: Videopont, ISBN 963-8218-20-7
- Görgey, Artúr (2004). Életem és működésem Magyarországon 1848-ban és 1849-ben- Görgey István fordítását átdolgozta, a bevezetőt és a jegyzeteket írta Katona Tamás (My Life and Activity in Hungary in 1848 and in 1849). István Görgey's translation was revised by Tamás Katona, and also he wrote the Introduction and the Notes. Neumann Kht.
- Hermann, Róbert (2004), Az 1848-1849-es szabadságharc nagy csatái ("The Great Battles of the 1848-1849 Freedom War") (in Hungarian), Budapest: Zrínyi, ISBN 963-327-367-6
- Hermann, Róbert (2001), 1848-1849 a szabadságharc hadtörténete ("Military History of 1848-1849") (in Hungarian), Budapest: Korona, ISBN 963-9376-21-3
