= Richard Guyon =

British-born Hungarian soldier

Richard de Beaufré comte de Guyon
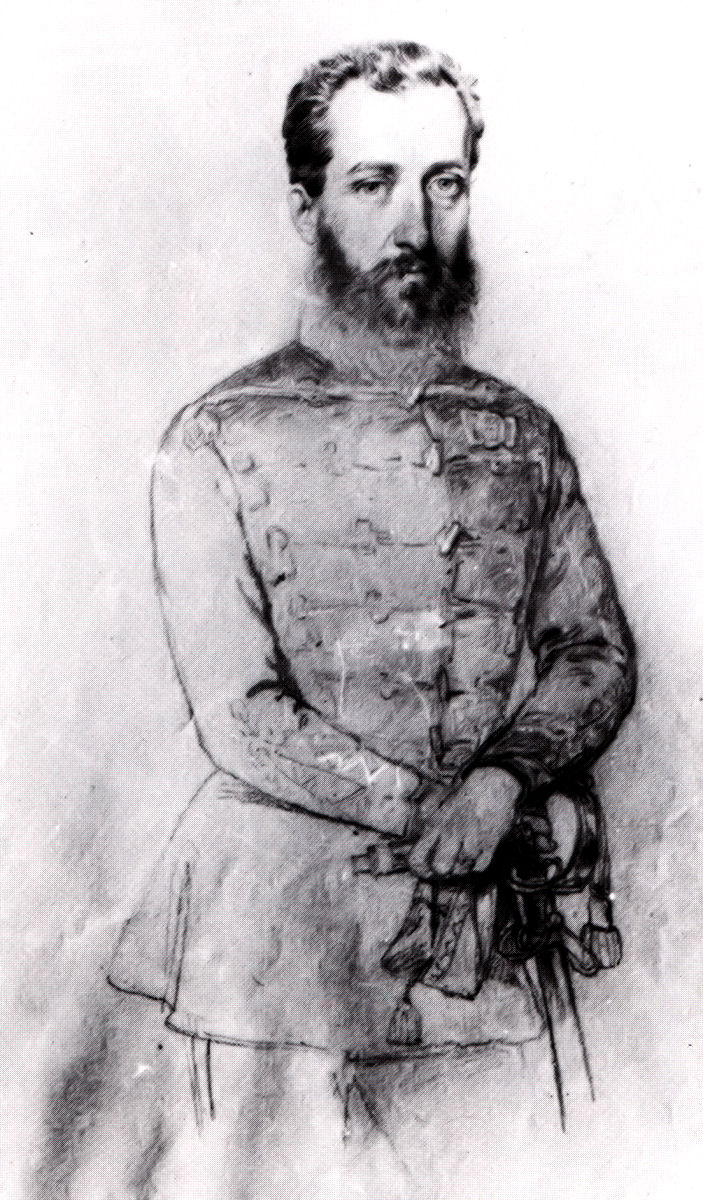
- Born: 1813; Walcot, Somerset, England
- Died: 12 October 1856; Scutari, Constantinople, Ottoman Empire
- Military career
- Allegiance: Hungary
- Rank: General
- Battles: Battle of Pákozd; Battle of Schwechat; Battle of Kapolna; Battle of Hegyes; Battle of Szőreg; Battle of Temesvár
- Other work: Governor of Damascus

Richard de Beaufré comte de Guyon (1813 – 12 October 1856) was a British-born Hungarian soldier, general in the Hungarian revolutionary army and Ottoman pasha (Kurshid Pasha).

== Biography ==
=== Early life ===
He was born at Walcot, near Bath, Somerset, the son of Commander John Guyon RN (1767–1844), a shipmate and friend of the Duke of Clarence (later William IV of Britain), and descended from a French noble family.

After receiving a military education in England, Guyon fought against Dom Miguel in the Liberal Wars in Portugal.

In 1832 Guyon entered the Austrian service joining the Hungarian Hussars; and was attached as aide-de-camp to General Baron Ignác Splényi (1772–1840), who had served at the Battle of Marengo and was captain-in-chief of the Hungarian noble bodyguard, and Standard Bearer of Hungary. Guyon married Baron Splényi's daughter, Baroness Marie, on 22 November 1838. They had two sons and a daughter together: Victor, Edgar and Marie Anne.

Until the outbreak of the Hungarian Revolution, Guyon led the life of a country gentleman on his estates near Komárom.

=== Hungarian Revolution ===
At the outbreak of the Hungarian Revolution, Guyon was among the first to offer his services to the national government as an officer of the Royal Hungarian Army, and played a prominent part in the struggle for independence during the Hungarian Revolution of 1848.

He won great distinction in the Battle of Pákozd (29 September 1848) and the Battle of Schwechat (30 October) and after the Battle of Kapolna (26 and 27 February 1849) was made a general.

During the retreat of Artúr Görgey's army in the winter of 1848–1849, Guyon carried the mountain-pass of Branyiszkó on 5 February 1849, and by that daring feat of his re-established the communication with the government at Debrecen, as also with the several other Hungarian army corps.

When, in April 1849, the garrison of the besieged Fortress of Komárom was to be apprised of the victorious approach of the national army, Guyon, with a detachment of hussars, cut his way through the enemy's lines, and announced the approaching relief.

On 14 July 1849, Guyon defeated the imperial army led by Josip Jelačić in the Battle of Hegyes, one of the last Hungarian victories of the freedom war, which assured Southern Hungary for the revolutionary army keeping the road open for the leaders of the revolution to escape in the Ottoman Empire.

The bloody Battle of Szőreg (5 August 1849) allowed General Henryk Dembiński, protected by the self-sacrificing ten battalions of Guyon, to retire to Temesvár, where the Battle of Temesvár, the last in the campaign, was fought and lost on 9 August. Guyon escaped to Turkey.

Two streets in Budapest are named after Count Guyon: Guyon Richárd utca, and Guyon köz. Guyon's Hussar uniform is preserved on display at the Museum of Military History in the Buda Castle Quarter.

=== Ottoman Empire ===
In 1852 Guyon entered the service of the Sultan without being required to change his faith.

Under the name of Kourshid Pasha, he, as a general of division, was Governor of Damascus, and at the beginning of the Crimean war, did much to organise the army of Kars. Guyon died of cholera at Scutari in 1856. According to the Oxford Dictionary of National Biography he was "the first Christian to obtain the rank of pasha and a Turkish military command without being obliged to change his religion".

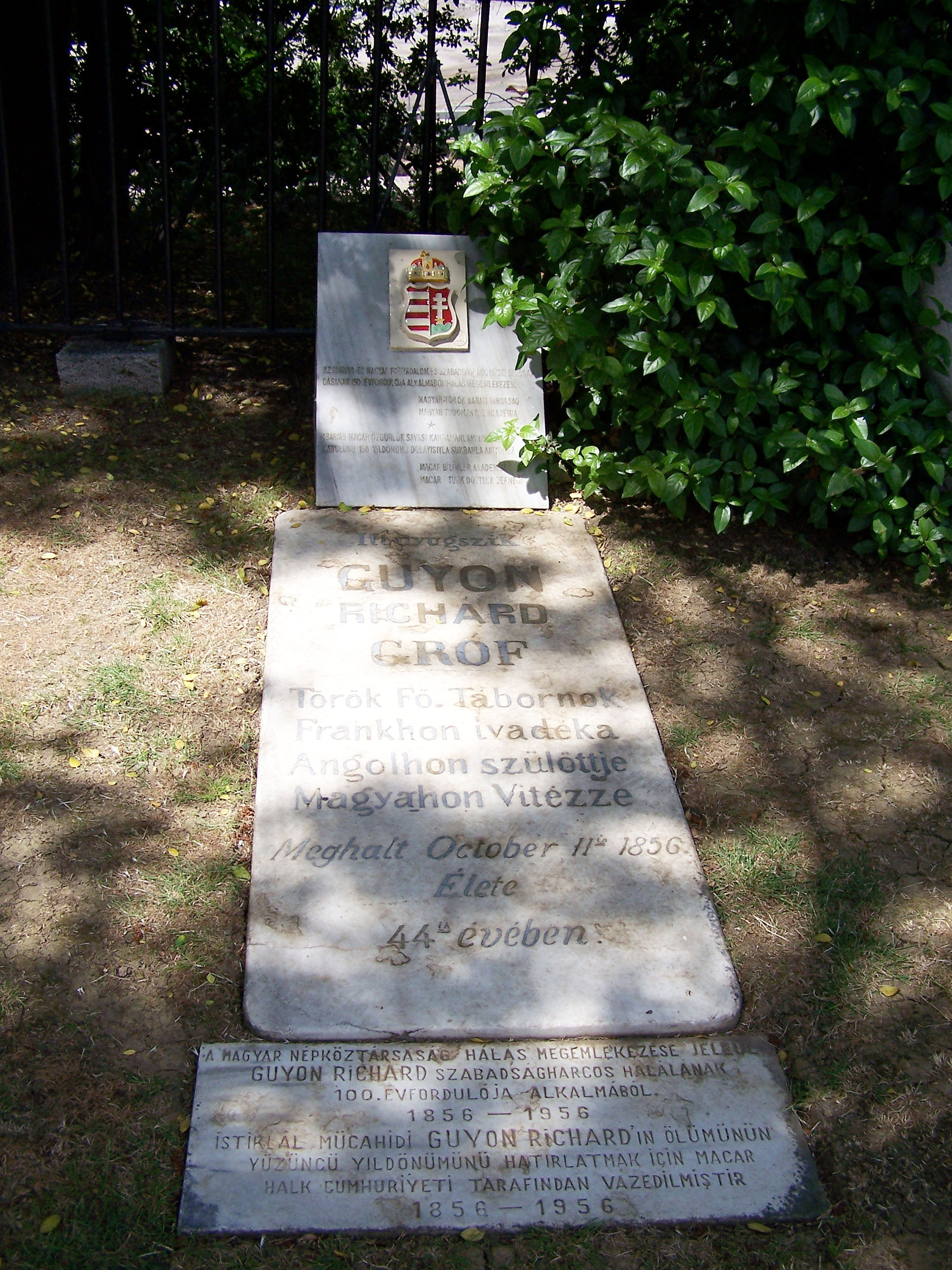
Grave of Richard Guyon at the Haydarpaşa Cemetery in Istanbul, Turkey

The 1863 Chambers Encyclopaedia states "Indomitable courage, and an incessant care for the comfort of the troops under his command, were the chief features in Guyon's character".

The Istanbul Military Museum holds a memorial bust of Guyon together with other Hungarian artifacts.
