= List of Hungarian communities in Serbia =

The following is a list of municipalities and cities in Serbia, in which ethnic Hungarians form majority or significant minority (i.e. over 10% of the total population). Hungarians constitute 2.7% of Serbia's total population and 10.5% of that of the province of Vojvodina, where they are largely concentrated.

| Municipality | Hungarian name | Hungarian population | Share of total population |
|---|---|---|---|
| Kanjiža | Magyarkanizsa | 16,740 | 83.1% |
| Senta | Zenta | 13,590 | 75.7% |
| Ada | Ada | 9,666 | 72.7% |
| Bačka Topola | Topolya | 14,599 | 55.6% |
| Mali Iđoš | Kishegyes | 5,174 | 51.8% |
| Čoka | Csóka | 3,835 | 44.8% |
| Bečej | Óbecse | 12,482 | 40.7% |
| Subotica | Szabadka | 37,200 | 30% |
| Novi Kneževac | Törökkanizsa | 1,956 | 22.6% |
| Temerin | Temerin | 5,607 | 21.7% |
| Srbobran | Szenttamás | 2,609 | 18.1% |
| Žitište | Begaszentgyörgy | 2,286 | 17% |
| Nova Crnja | Magyarcsernye | 1,247 | 15.3% |
| Novi Bečej | Törökbecse | 2,915 | 14.6% |
| Sečanj | Torontálszécsány | 1,246 | 10.8% |
| Plandište | Zichyfalva | 913 | 10.2% |
| Novi Sad | Újvidék | 9,792 | 2.6% |

Note: Novi Sad, although it does not reach the 10% threshold, is also listed, as it has one of the largest Hungarian communities in Serbia.

== See also ==
- Hungarians in Serbia
