= Mali Iđoš =

Mali Iđoš Мали Иђош (Serbian) Kishegyes (Hungarian)
- Village and municipality
- Cultural centre in Mali Iđoš

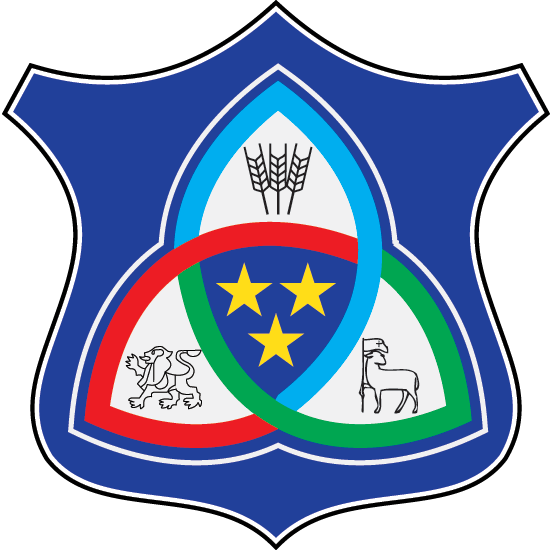
- Coat of arms

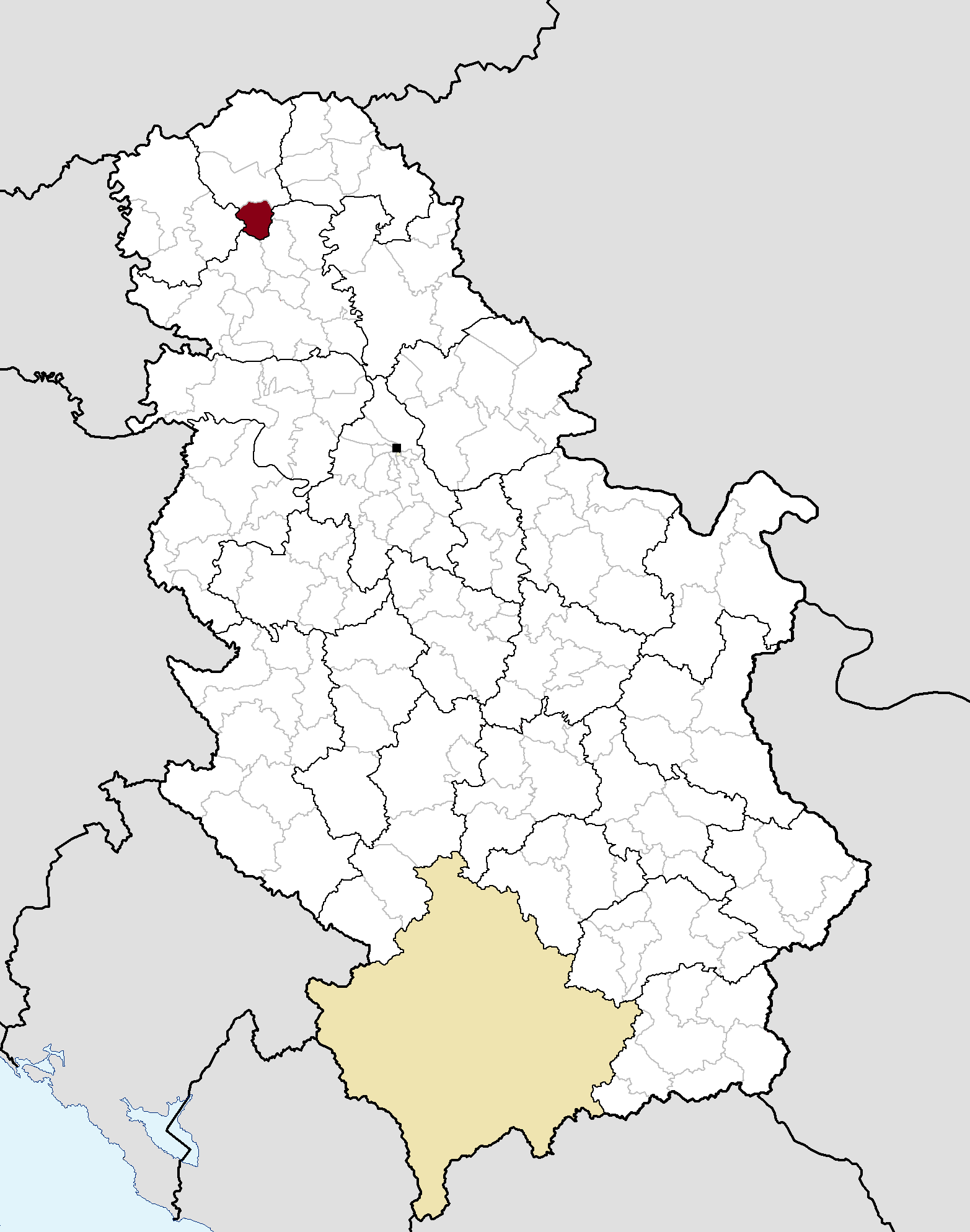
- Location of the municipality of Mali Iđoš within Serbia

- Location within Vojvodina Location within Serbia Location within Europe
- Coordinates: 45°42′25″N 19°39′52″E
- Country: Serbia
- Province: Vojvodina
- District: North Bačka
- Settlements: 3

Government
  - Mayor: Marko Lazić (SNS)

Area
  - Municipality: 175 km^{2} (68 sq mi)
- Elevation: 88 m (289 ft)

Population (2022 census)
  - Town: 4,118
  - Municipality: 9,983
- Time zone: UTC+1 (CET)
  - Summer (DST): UTC+2 (CEST)
- Postal code: 24321
- Area code: +381 24
- Car plates: SU

Mali Iđoš (Montenegrin/Serbian Cyrillic: Мали Иђош, pronounced [mâːliː îdʑoʃ]; Hungarian: Kishegyes, pronounced [ˈkiʃhɛɟɛʃ]) is a village and municipality located in the North Bačka District of the autonomous province Vojvodina, Serbia. The village has a population of 4,118, of whom 3,307 (80.31%) are Hungarians, 294 (7.14%) are Serbs and 200 (4.86%) are Romani people.

== Name ==
The first part of the name of the village, "mali" ("little" in English), was given in contrast to the village with similar name (Iđoš), which is situated in northern Banat. The etymology goes back to the Hungarian name, 'Kishegyes', consisting of 'kis' (little) and 'hegyes' (mountainy [place]).

== Inhabited places ==
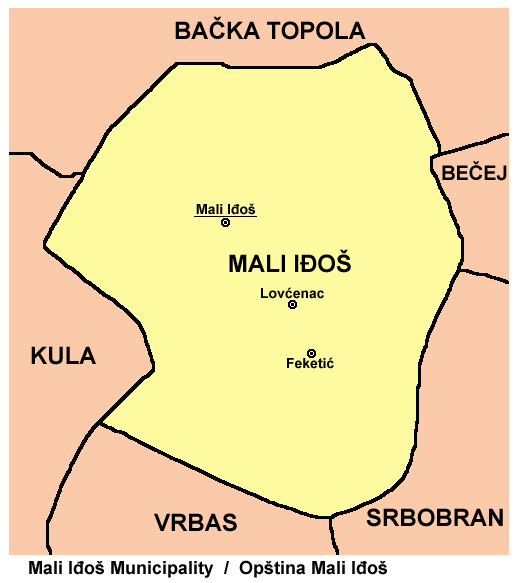
Map of Mali Iđoš municipality

Mali Iđoš municipality includes the following villages:

- Mali Iđoš (Hungarian: Kishegyes)
- Lovćenac (Hungarian: Szeghegy)(Montenegrin: Ловћенац)
- Feketić (Hungarian: Bácsfeketehegy)

== Demographics ==
Historical population
Year	Pop.	±% p.a.
1948	17,683	—
1953	16,767	−1.06%
1961	17,144	+0.28%
1971	15,651	−0.91%
1981	14,975	−0.44%
1991	14,394	−0.39%
2002	13,494	−0.59%
2011	12,031	−1.27%
2022	9,983	−1.68%

According to the 2022 census results, the municipality of Mali Iđoš has a population of 9,983 inhabitants.

=== Ethnic groups ===
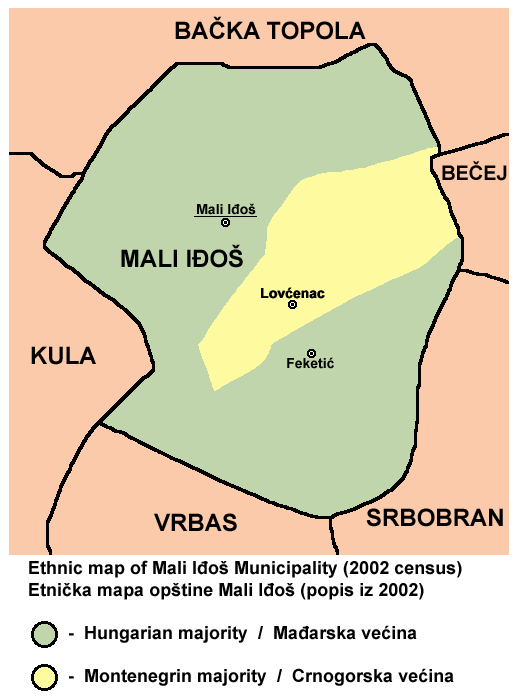
Ethnic map of the Mali Iđoš municipality

Local communities with a Hungarian majority are Mali Iđoš and Feketić. There is one local community with a Montenegrin majority: Lovćenac.

The ethnic composition of the municipality:

Ethnicity	Population	Share
Hungarians	5,174	51.8%
Serbs	2,313	23.1%
Montenegrins	1,226	12.3%
Roma	372	3.7%
Albanians	45	0.4%
Muslims	33	0.3%
Yugoslavs	29	0.3%
Croats	22	0.2%
Rusyns	20	0.2%
Macedonians	11	0.1%
Others	738	7.4%
Total	9,983	

== History ==
The name of Kishegyes was first mentioned in historical documents in 1476, without naming the shire, when the estates of the Maróthi family in the region of the Tisza river were counted. On 16 February 1462 Matthias Corvinus gave the settlements listed in the document as a present to his mother, Erzsébet Szilágyi. The destruction of the village started in 1514. The riot of György Dózsa required not only material damages, demolitions, driving away of cattle, but also a huge number of human victims. All this was followed by the defeat of Mohács. After the battle, the victor, the general of sultan Suleiman the Magnificent withdrew between the Danube and the Tisza rivers. The institutional Turkish subjection started after the fall of Buda, in 1541. The village became totally destroyed under Turkish occupation in the 16th century. The later Turkish tax assessment registers mention Kishegyes in the nahije of Szabadka with 18 houses to pay taxes in 1580–82 and 1590–91, and 17 in Nagyhegyes in 1580 and 23 houses in 1590. In 1652 the inhabitants of Hegyes paid taxes to Ferenc Wesselényi. It was repopulated in 1769 by 81 Roman Catholic Hungarian families from Békésszentandrás. During the Hungarian Revolution of 1848 in Battle of Hegyes, the Hungarian soldiers gained a victory in Kishegyes on 14 July 1849. The region is extremely well suited for agriculture and the village increased in wealth and population until the 1980s. In the 1990s the local economy was ruined and young people began to emigrate to Hungary. Today the rate of unemployment is appr. 30 percent, and the Agricultural Cooperative and the Commercial Company went bankrupt. After the end of the civil war in Croatia and Bosnia (1995–96) Serbian refugees arrived to Mali Iđoš (Kishegyes). There are no ethnic tensions between native Hungarians and the Serbian refugees.

== Sights ==
The oldest building in Mali Iđoš is the baroque Roman Catholic Church of St. Anne (1788) on the Main Street. There is an old Calvary, the obelisk of the Battle of Hegyes and the ruins of the Pecze Mansion. The natural attractions are the River Krivaja and the imposing loessal walls of the Hills of Telečka.

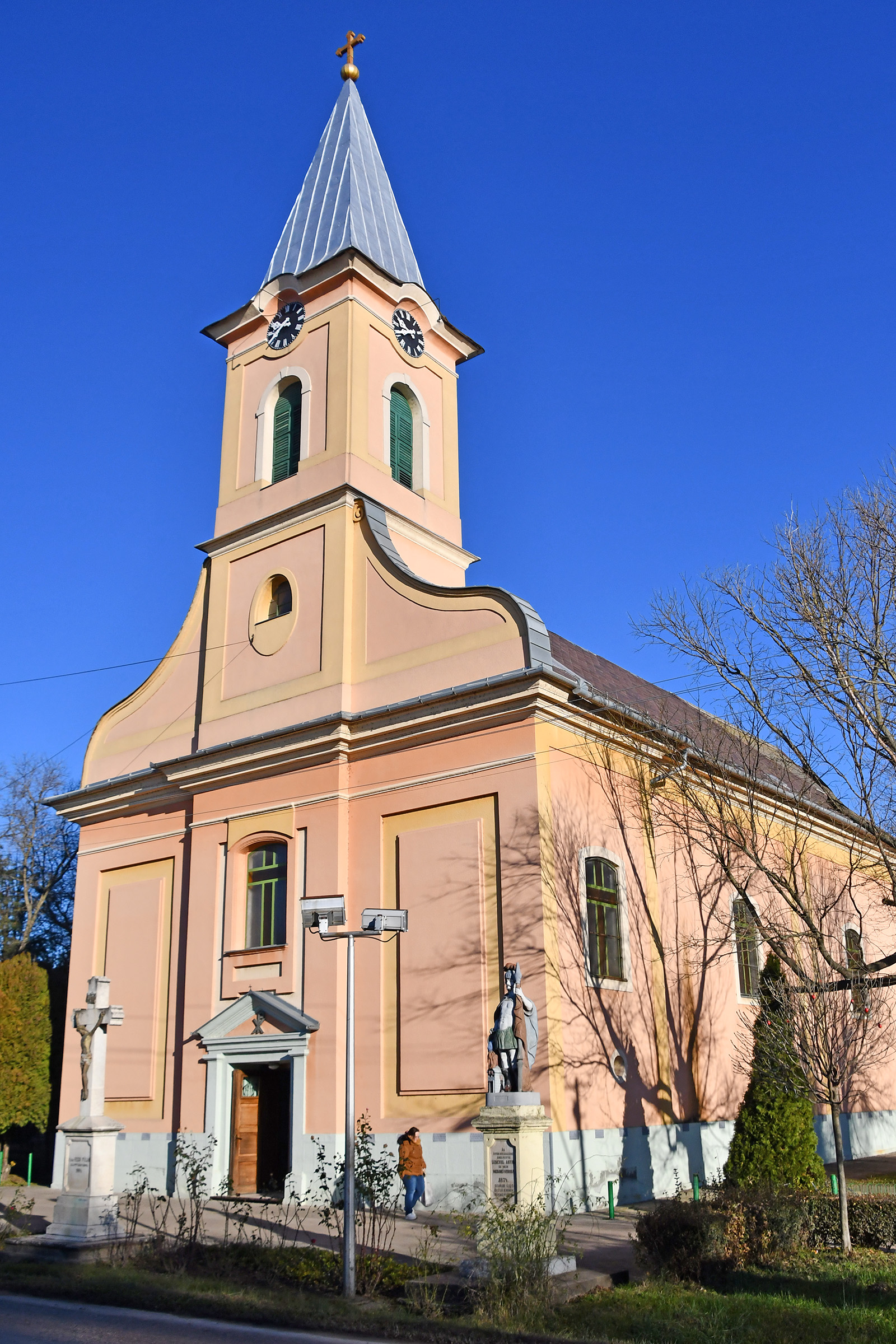
Church of Saint Anne in Mali Iđoš

== Notable people ==
- The Hungarian singer Magdolna Rúzsa grew up in Mali Iđoš. She won Megasztár, Hungary's version of Pop Idol in 2006 and represented Hungary at the Eurovision Song Contest 2007 in Helsinki, Finland.
- István Dudás is a former Serbian professional footballer, who currently works as Goalkeeper coach for R.O.C. de Charleroi-Marchienne.
- Félix Lajkó is a violinist, grew up in Mali Iđoš
- Adriana Világos is a javelin thrower, she was raised and currently live in Mali Iđoš

== International relations ==
=== Twin towns – sister cities ===
Mali Iđoš municipality is twinned with:

- Bar, Montenegro
- Cetinje, Montenegro
- Gádoros, Hungary
- Sokobanja, Serbia
- Solnechnogorsk, Russia

== See also ==
- List of places in Serbia
- List of cities, towns and villages in Vojvodina
- List of Hungarian communities in Serbia

== Other sources ==
- Slobodan Ćurčić, Broj stanovnika Vojvodine, Novi Sad, 1996. OCLC ocm39963150
