= Battle of Kishegyes =

Battle in the Hungarian Revolution of 1848

Coordinates: 45°41′26.5″N 19°40′04.8″E

Battle of Kisegyes
- Part of the Hungarian Revolution of 1848
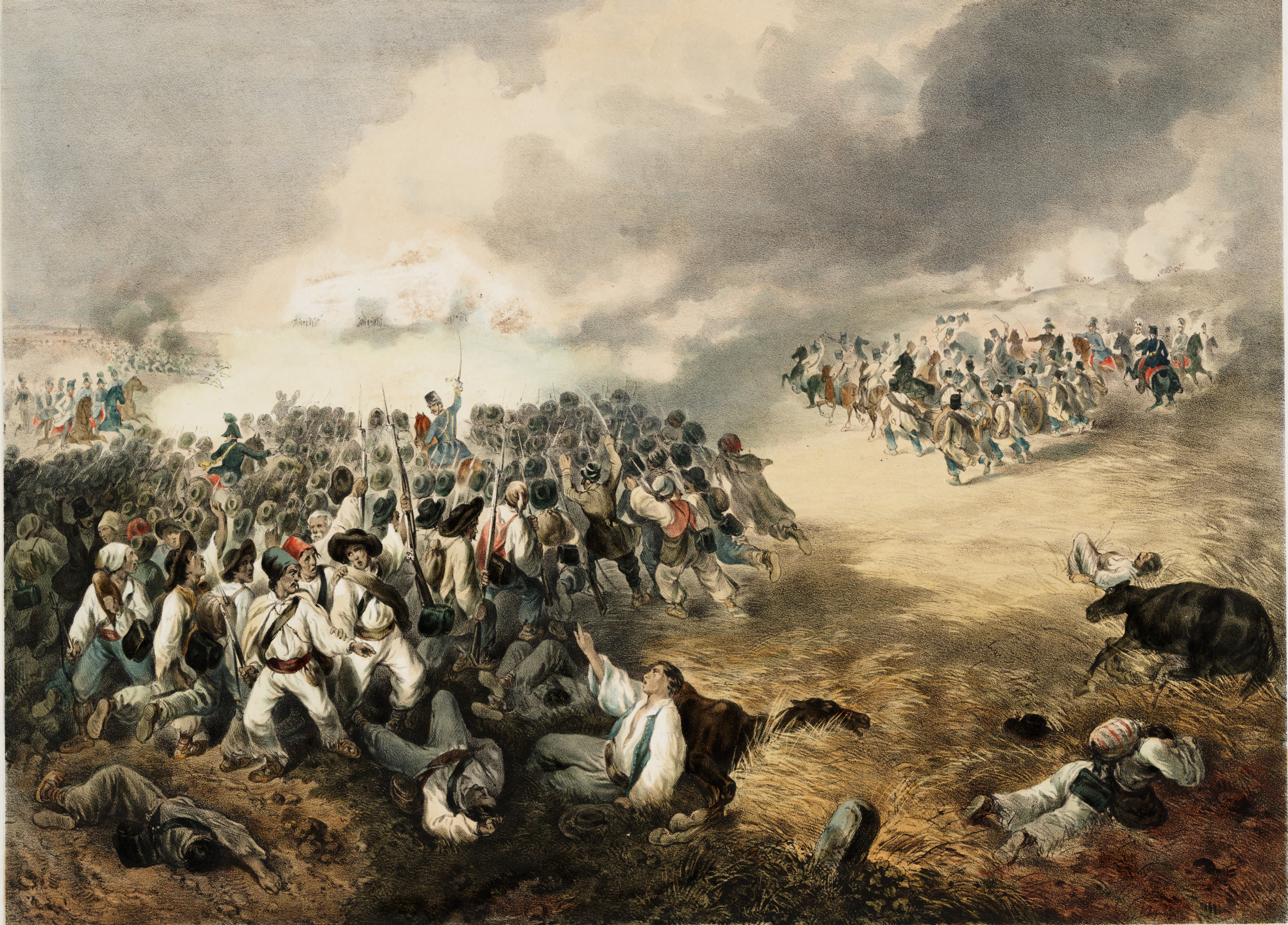
- Battle of Kishegyes July 14, 1849
Date	July 14, 1849
Location	Hegyes, Bács-Bodrog County, Kingdom of Hungary
Result	Hungarian victory

Belligerents
Hungarian Revolutionary Army	Austrian Empire: Croatia

Commanders and leaders
Antal Vetter; Richard Guyon	Josip Jelačić

Strength
Total: 8,360 + ? (61 infantry companies, 14 cavalry companies); 46 cannons Did not participate: 6,603 (37 infantry companies, 8 cavalry companies); 17 cannons	17,994 men (112 infantry companies, 30 cavalry companies); 73 cannons

Casualties and losses
Total: 226; 81 dead, 145 wounded	Total: 985; 164 dead, 473 wounded, 348 missing and captured

The Battle of Kishegyes (modern-day Mali Iđoš, Vojvodina, Serbia) was a military engagement during the Hungarian Revolution of 1848. Fought from 11–15 July 1849, the battle pitted the Hungarian Revolutionary Army, commanded by Generals Antal Vetter and Richard Guyon, against the Imperial Habsburg Corps led by Lieutenant Field Marshal Josip Jelačić, Ban of Croatia, whose forces included allied Croatian and Serbian units.

The conflict began when Jelačić, attempting a surprise night attack on Hungarian positions, inadvertently encountered their defensive lines. Hungarian forces swiftly counterattacked, routing Jelačić’s army and compelling its retreat to the Serbian-fortified Titel Plateau.

The Hungarian victory reversed territorial losses in Bácska incurred after the Battle of Káty (modern-day Kati, Serbia) and reestablished Hungarian control over key areas. It also revitalized the Hungarian army’s strategic initiative on the Southern Front, marking a turning point in the latter stages of the revolution.

== Background ==
Following defeats at the Battle of Káty (7 June 1849) and First Siege of Budapest (25 June 1849), Lieutenant General Antal Vetter was appointed commander-in-chief of the Hungarian Revolutionary Army. Vetter established his headquarters at Topolya and began reorganizing his forces. By 12 July, reinforcements arrived, including Major General György Kmety's division (redeployed from western Hungary after the Hungarian defeat at the Battle of Ihász on 27 June) and the Pereczi Brigade, bolstering Hungarian strength to 20,000 troops.

Vetter devised a plan to counterattack Josip Jelačić, commander of the Habsburg-Croatian-Serbian forces. His strategy involved feinting attacks along the Ferenc Channel (Hungarian: Ferenc csatorna; German: K.K. Franzens Schiffahrts Canal) to divert Jelačić’s attention, while Kmety’s division crossed the channel at Szivác to flank Austrian positions at Kula. Simultaneously, the IV Corps under General Richard Guyon would assault the Austrians frontally.

Jelačić, wary of Hungarian intentions and fearing an attack from the Fortress of Pétervárad to his rear, dispatched reconnaissance forces: the Ottinger Cavalry Brigade to Kishegyes and the Horváth Cavalry Brigade to Zombor on 5 July. After skirmishing with Hungarian units, Ottinger withdrew to Verbász, while Horváth retreated from Zombor on 10 July upon Kmety’s arrival.

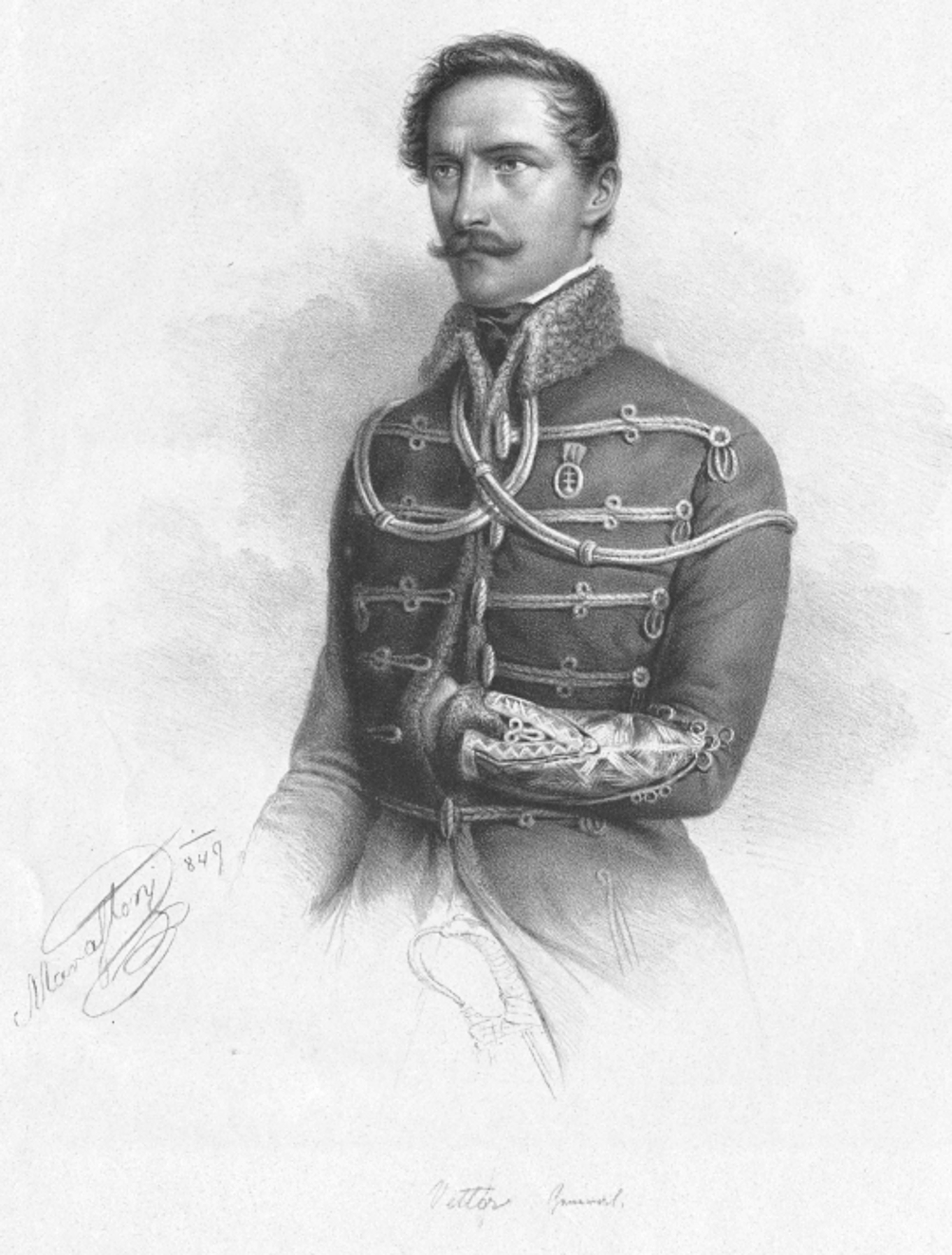
Vetter Antal Marastoni József

Anticipating a Hungarian pincer movement as Guyon’s and Kmety's forces converged, Jelačić faced three options: maintain a defensive line along the Ferenc Channel (risking encirclement), retreat to the fortified Titel Plateau, or preemptively strike the Hungarians using defeat in detail tactics. He chose to attack Guyon's isolated units at Kishegyes, Szeghegy, and Feketehegy—closest to his position— hoping to secure his army until General Julius Jacob von Haynau's main Austrian force arrived from Komárom in 2–3 weeks.

To mitigate risks, Jelačić ordered the Draskovich Brigade to construct a rescue bridge at Futak across the Ferenc Channel and stationed rear guards at Bácsföldvár, Szenttamás, Verbász, and Kula under Lieutenant General Kriegern.

=== Hungarian preparations ===
General Guyon, aware of Jelačić's plan, fortified Kishegyes with 8,000 troops but lacked support from Kmety's 4,000 soldiers, who were advancing toward Kula. The Hungarian position spanned the Krivaja Creek valley:

- Szeghegy (right bank) and Kishegyes/Feketehegy (bisected by the creek) formed the defensive line.
- The Pereczi Division held Kishegyes and Szeghegy, while the Igmándy Division defended Feketehegy.
- A reserve force remained at Topolya.

Guyon's strategy aimed to pin Jelačić's forces at Kishegyes with his right wing, then flank the Austrians using his center (Szeghegy) and left wing (Feketehegy). Meanwhile, the Bánffy Division at Perlasz (across the Tisza River, opposite the Titel Plateau) played an indirect role in the upcoming battle.

== Prelude ==
Lieutenant Field Marshal Josip Jelačić devised a plan to launch a night attack on Kishegyes, aiming to seize the village before pivoting southeast to assault Hungarian positions at Szeghegy and Feketehegy. His forces commenced their advance at 23:00 on 14 July, organized in a columnar formation: the Castiglione Cavalry Brigade and artillery formed the vanguard, followed by the Puffer and Budisavljević Infantry Brigades (part of the Dietrich Division) on the right and left flanks, respectively. The rear comprised the Rastić Infantry Brigade, screened by the Horváth Cavalry Brigade on the left and a dragoon regiment on the right. Approximately one hour into the march, Jelačić diverted three battalions and an artillery battery to investigate reports of Hungarian activity near Kucura—7 km from his supply depot at Kiskér—before resuming the march toward Kishegyes.

General Richard Guyon, commanding the Hungarian IV Corps at Kishegyes, had reportedly been alerted to the impending attack. Historian József Bánlaky claims Guyon hosted a champagne party to feign complacency, deliberately withholding patrols while positioning his troops in darkness with weapons ready to ambush the Austrians. Conversely, historian Róbert Hermann contends Guyon omitted patrols due to underestimating the likelihood of an assault. Guyon's force consisted of 61 infantry companies, 14 cavalry companies, 1,485 horses, 46 cannons, and approximately 8,360 soldiers. Notably absent was Major General György Kmety's division (6,603 troops with 37 infantry companies, 8 cavalry companies, 832 saddle horses, and 17 cannons), which remained en route to Kula during the battle. Jelačić, by contrast, marched with 112 infantry companies, 30 cavalry companies, 4,923 horses, 73 cannons, and 17,994 troops, significantly outnumbering Guyon's contingent.

== Battle ==
At approximately 03:00 on 15 July 1849, Hungarian outposts near Kishegyes reported suspicious noises resembling artillery movement to their commander, Colonel Antal Frummer, who ordered cannon fire toward the source. Austrian officers exacerbated their exposure by shouting orders audibly to Hungarian forces, prompting Frummer to intensify artillery bombardments and deploy skirmishers. The ensuing gunfire alerted Hungarian troops, who illuminated the battlefield with flares and opened fire on Jelačić's advancing column.

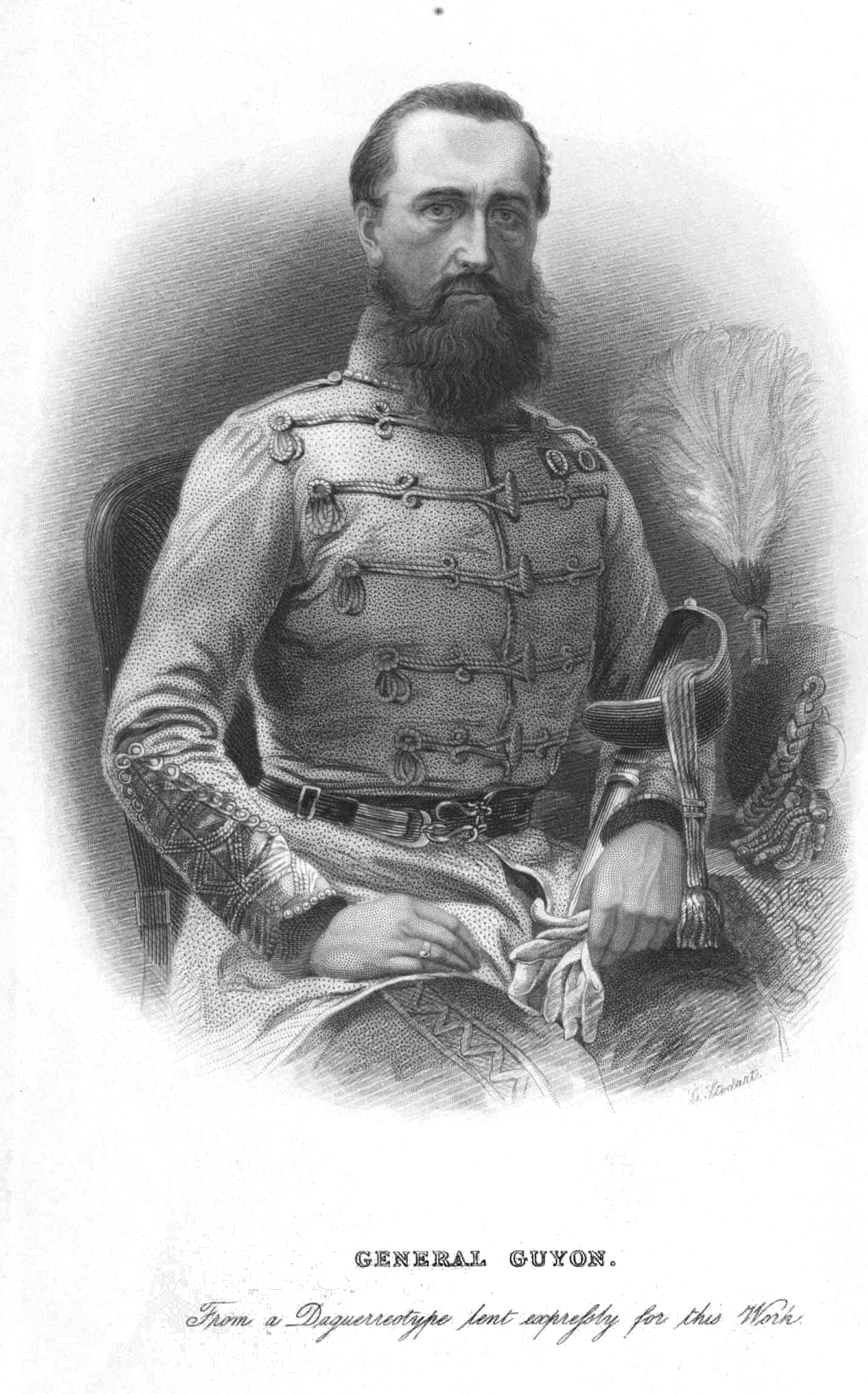
Guyon Richard

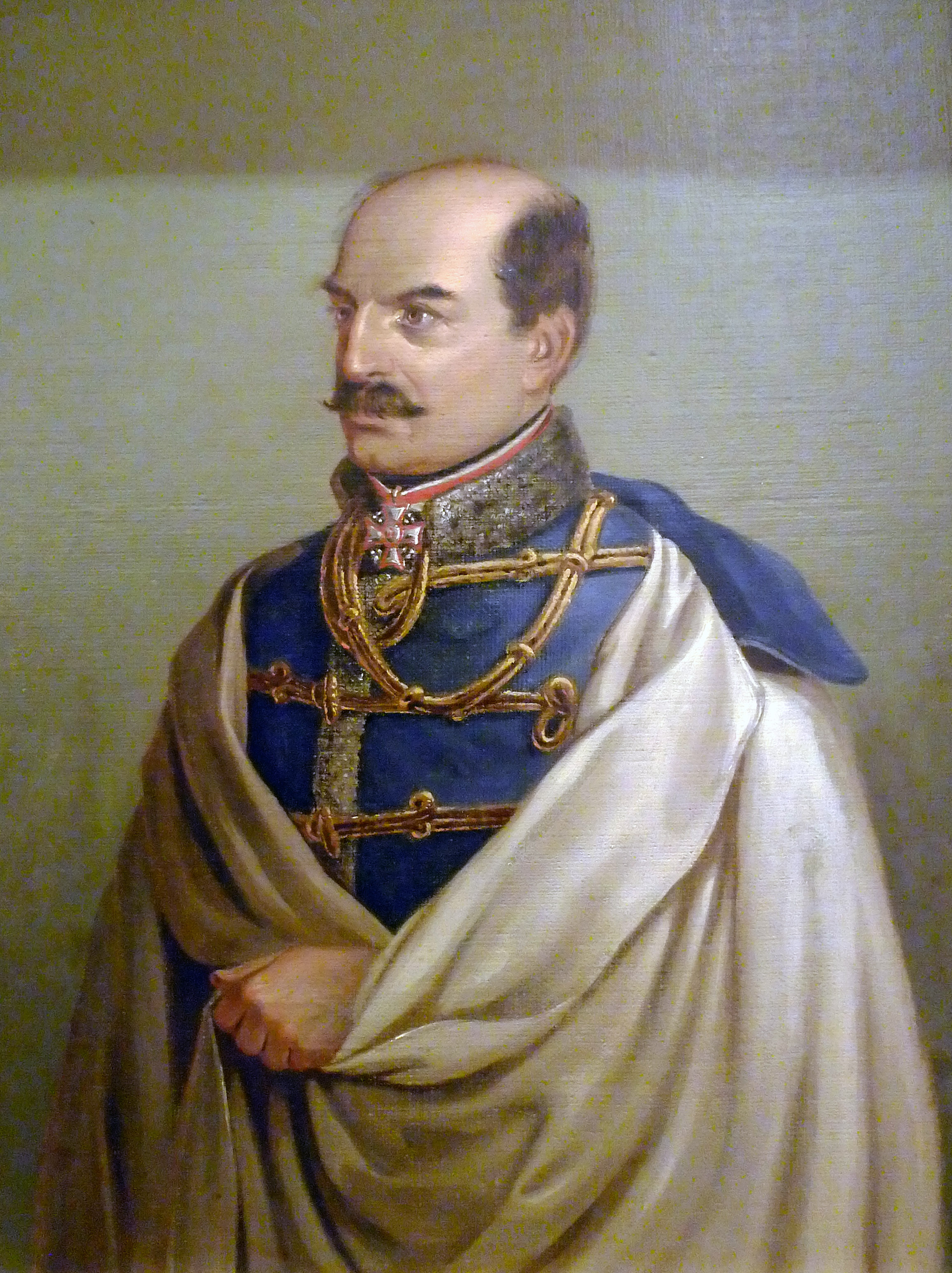
Josip Jelačić painting 1850

Though Hungarian volleys caused minimal casualties due to the range, the loss of surprise demoralized Jelačić's forces. Undeterred, Jelačić deployed his troops parallel to Hungarian lines:

- Left Wing: Lieutenant General Ferenc Ottinger's Castiglione cuirassier Brigade.
- Center: The Dietrich Division, with the Puffer Infantry Brigade (right flank) and Budisavljević Infantry Brigade (left flank), supported by interspersed artillery.
- Right Wing: Horváth Cavalry Brigade and imperial dragoons.
- Reserve: Major General Daniel Rastić's infantry and remaining artillery.

Jelačić ordered the Dietrich Division to assault Kishegyes, with cavalry flanking and the Puffer Brigade targeting Szeghegy. Hungarian forces responded by withdrawing skirmishers and unleashing concentrated artillery fire, halting the Austrian advance. Elements of the Budisavljević Brigade retreated under fire but regrouped after the Hungarian right wing withheld a counterattack. General Richard Guyon then dispatched two infantry battalions to threaten the Austrian right flank, forcing the Budisavljević Brigade to mount a renewed—and ultimately futile—assault under heavy artillery support.

As Hungarian cavalry charged the retreating Austrians, Licca Battalion and the 4th Ban’s Regiment halted them with disciplined volleys. Guyon shifted infantry to Szeghegy to flank Jelačić's forces, delegating command of the right wing to Colonel Ágoston Tóth. Concurrently, four Hungarian hussar companies sallied from Feketehegy, scattering Austrian supply units near Verbász until driven back by dragoons and artillery.

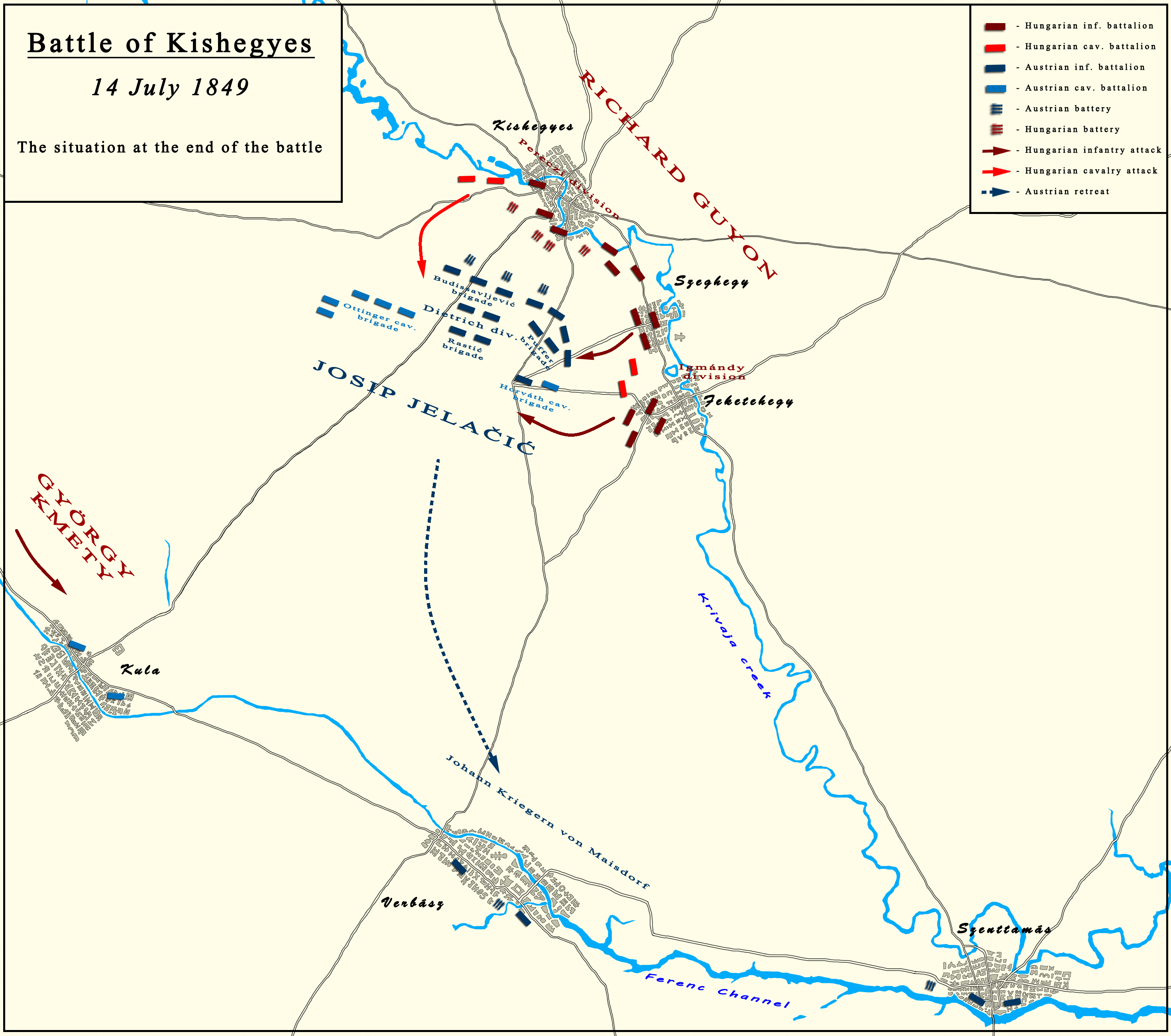
Battle of Kishegyes from July 14, 1849

=== Collapse of Jelačić's offensive ===
By mid-morning, Jelačić's retreat route across the Krivaja Creek risked encirclement. A final assault by the Dietrich Division collapsed under Hungarian artillery, while coordinated attacks from Kishegyes, Szeghegy, and Feketehegy threatened to envelop his army. Jelačić deployed General Horváth with two infantry battalions, six cavalry companies, and three 12-pounder guns to stabilize his flank, enabling a staggered retreat toward Verbász.

=== Strategic diversion at Perlasz ===
That same day, Colonel Bánffy's garrison across the Tisza River launched a diversionary assault on Perlasz, shelling Serbian positions near Titel. Though unsuccessful in capturing the plateau, Bánffy's actions pinned down Serbian reserves, preventing reinforcement of Jelačić's forces.

=== Aftermath ===
Jelačić's escape narrowly avoided total annihilation. Major General György Kmety's 6,600-strong division, delayed by logistical delays, reached Kerény and Szivác too late to block the retreat.

Austrian rearguards at Verbász withstood Hungarian artillery for two hours before retreating south across the Danube, joining the siege of Pétervárad. By 18 July, Habsburg forces retained only the Titel Plateau in Bácska, ceding the region to Hungarian control.

== Aftermath ==
The Battle of Kishegyes resulted in 985 casualties (164 killed, 473 wounded, 348 missing or captured) and 191 horses lost (126 killed, 47 wounded, 18 missing) for Jelačić's Habsburg-Croatian-Serbian corps, while Hungarian forces sustained 226 casualties (81 killed, 145 wounded). The victory restored Hungarian military initiative in the southern theater, forcing Jelačić to retreat to Szerémség (modern-day Srem, Serbia), where his forces remained inactive until the Hungarian surrender at Világos (present-day Șiria, Romania) in August 1849. On 17 July 1849, Hungarian commander Lieutenant General Antal Vetter advanced south, capturing Pétervárad (Petrovaradin, Serbia) and establishing his headquarters. Vetter's initial strategy aimed to break the Austrian encirclement south of the fortress and seize Karlóca (Sremski Karlovci, Serbia) and Szalánkemén (Slankamen, Serbia) to isolate Serbian forces on the Titel Plateau. However, the Hungarian War Ministry ordered a direct assault on Titel instead. On 23 July, General Richard Guyon launched a multi-pronged attack against the plateau but was repelled.

Later that day, Vetter redeployed the IV Corps to Szeged to counter the advancing Austrian main army under General Julius Jacob von Haynau, leaving Major General György Kmety's division in Bácska. The IV Corps departed on 25 July, and by 3 August, Kmety had repositioned his troops to the left bank of the Tisza River, effectively concluding Hungarian military operations in the region.

== Sources ==
- Bánlaky, József (2001). A magyar nemzet hadtörténelme ("The Military History of the Hungarian Nation) (in Hungarian). Budapest: Arcanum Adatbázis.
- Bóna, Gábor (1987). Tábornokok és törzstisztek a szabadságharcban 1848–49 ("Generals and Staff Officers in the War of Freedom 1848–1849") (in Hungarian). Budapest: Zrínyi Katonai Kiadó. p. 430. ISBN 963-326-343-3.
- Hermann, Róbert (2001), 1848-1849 a szabadságharc hadtörténete ("Military History of 1848-1849") (in Hungarian), Budapest: Korona, ISBN 963-9376-21-3
- Hermann, Róbert (2004). Az 1848–1849-es szabadságharc nagy csatái ("Great battles of the Hungarian Revolution of 1848-1849") (in Hungarian). Budapest: Zrínyi. p. 408. ISBN 963-327-367-6.
