= György Kmety =

Hungarian soldier

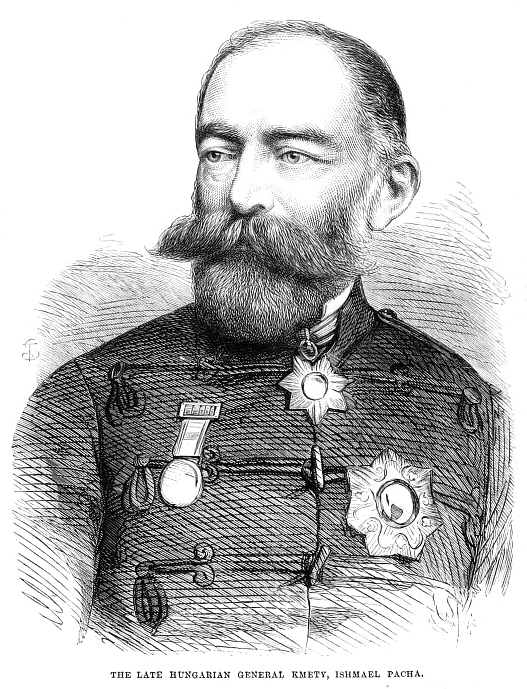
- Ismail Pasha in Ottoman military uniform
- Born: 24 May 1813; Felsőpokorágy (today Vyšná Pokorad, Slovakia)
- Died: 25 April 1865 (aged 51); London
- Military career
- Allegiance: Hungarian Revolutionary Army; Ottoman Empire
- Rank: General
- Conflicts: Battle of Schwechat; Crimean War

György Kmety (Felsőpokorágy, 24 May 1813 – London, 25 April 1865) was a general in the Hungarian Army, and in the Ottoman Army under the name Ismail Pasha.

== Career ==
Kmety's father was a noble but poor Lutheran vicar who died in 1818, so his brother Pál (Paul) brought him up. Kmety completed his studies in Késmárk (today Kežmarok, Slovakia) and in 1833 he joined the 19th Army. At the end of 1847 he was a non-commissioned officer in Joseph Radetzky von Radetz's army as a first lieutenant. On 1 October 1848 in Győr he joined the 23rd Army Corps as a captain.

=== Hungarian Revolution of 1848 ===
Kmety played an important role in setting up the corps, because another captain ended up not enlisting because of illness. Kmety was leading four companies when he went with Lajos Kossuth to János Móga's camp, and with them fought the Battle of Schwechat. For this Kossuth awarded him a captaincy in the 1st Army Corps. Later he was promoted to colonel for defeating a cavalry attack. From 15 February 1849 Kmety was leading a division.

Kmety didn't fight in the Battle of Kápolna because of Henryk Dembiński's poor leadership, although he covered the retreating Hungarian army. On 28 February 1849 Kmety won the battle against Franz Deym at Mezőkövesd. On 14 April 1849 he was promoted to colonel.

Kmety led the Hungarians to recover Buda, but he was injured. After that he was commanded to occupy the banks of the River Rába. On 13 June Kmety defeated the Austrian troops led by Franz Wyss in the Battle of Csorna, and because of this he received the general title. On 27 June Edler von Warensberg defeated Kmety and he had to move towards Vojvodina. Even though Kmety tried to rush his troops he missed the Battle of Hegyes against Josip Jelačić.

On 9 August Kmety joined to the Hungarian army corps at Temesvár (now Timișoara, Romania). On the left flank Kmety advanced successfully, but in other sections of the corps he also had to retreat. On 15 August Kmety defeated the Austrian Army at Lugos (now Lugoj, Romania).

=== After the Revolution ===
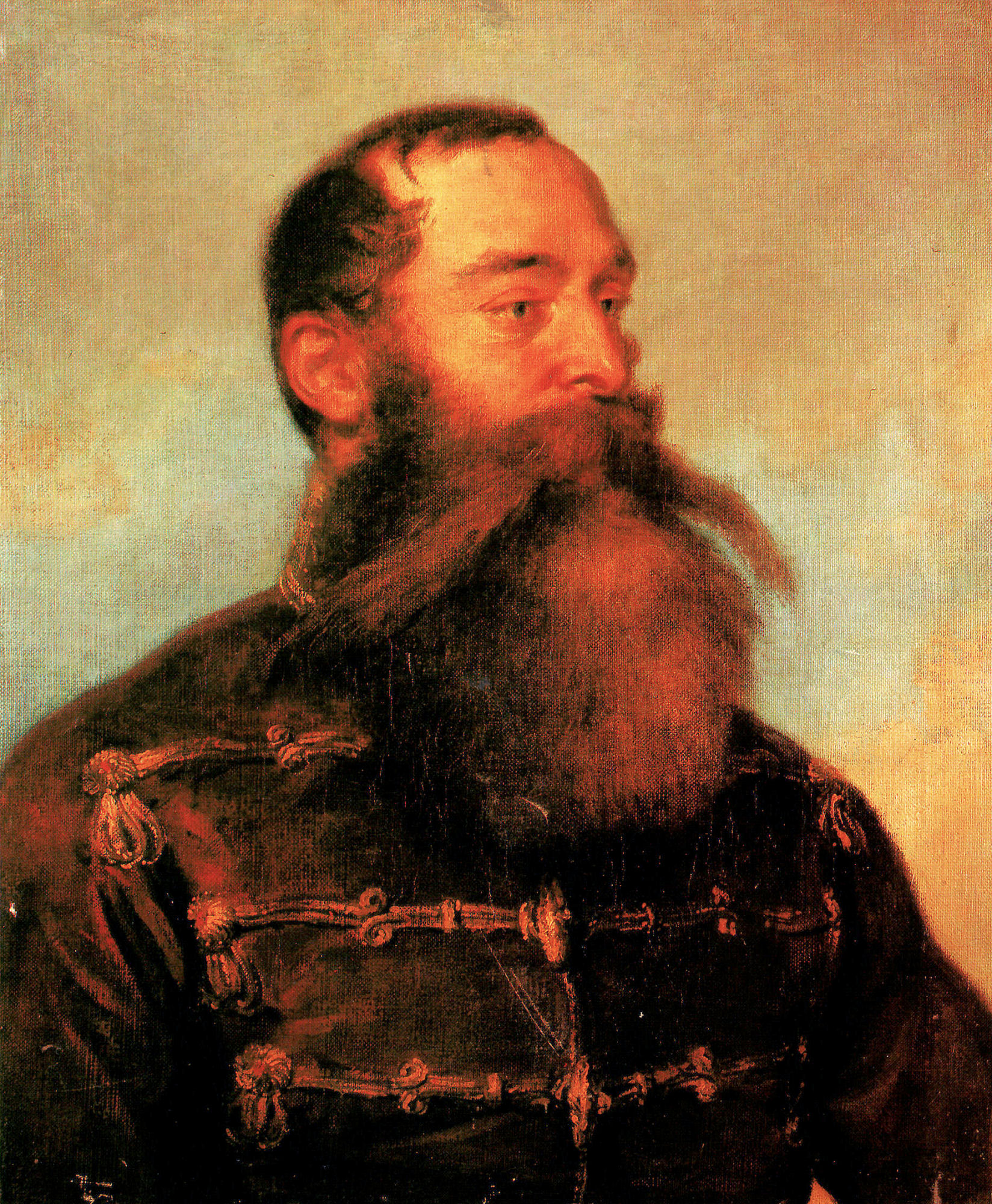
György Kmety painted by Károly Brocky

After the Surrender at Világos Kmety fled to the Ottoman Empire and he joined to the Ottoman army under the name of Isma'il, but he did not convert to Islam. The Ottoman people liked him and asked him to modernise the Ottoman army, which he did. Kmety was transferred to Aleppo with Józef Bem, where they helped to suppress a serious riot.

After Bem's death Kmety moved to London, where his first work was published. At the beginning of the Crimean War Kmety returned to the Ottoman Empire where he was defeated by the Russians at the Siege of Kars on 29 September 1855. (Note: The defeat was the subject of his second book.) When General William Fenwick Williams wanted to give up the castle, Kmety decided to engage combat with the enemy's troops. Because of that Kmety received an award from the Ottoman government.

In 1861 Kmety retired and returned to London where he died in 1865.

=== Legacy ===
In recognition of his help, after Kmety's death the Turks erected a statue that still stands in Kensal Green Cemetery (London). Kmety never married and had no children.

== Works ==
- Kmety, György (1852). A Refutation of Some of the Principal Mistatements in Görgei's 'Life and Actions in Hungary in the Years 1848 and 1849' with Critical Remarks on his Character as a Military Leader. London.
- Görgey, Artur (1852). Mein Leben und Wirken in Ungarn. (Foreword by György Kmety) (in German). Leipzig.
- Kmety, György (1856). A Narrative of the Defence of Kars on the 29th September, 1855. London.

== Sources ==
- Arbanász, Ildikó; Csorba, György. "Kmety György emlékirata Kars erődjének 1855. szeptember 29-i védelméről ("A Narrative of the Defence of Kars on the 29th September, 1855)". Hadtörténelmi Közlemények (in Hungarian). 118 (2005) (1–2).
- Hermann, Róbert (2004). Az 1848-1849-es szabadságharc nagy csatái (in Hungarian). Zrínyi. ISBN 963-327-367-6.
- Bona, Gábor (1999). "Az 1848-49-es honvédsereg katonai vezetői". Rubicon (in Hungarian) (4).
- Hermann, Róbert (1999). Az ihászi ütközet emlékkönyve, 1849-1999 (in Hungarian). MEK. ISBN 9789630378291.
- Kedves, Gyula (1999). "Kmety és Guyon". Rubicon (in Hungarian) (4).
