= Demographic history of Serbia =

This article presents the demographic history of Serbia through census results. See Demographics of Serbia for a more detailed overview of the current demographics.

== Overview ==
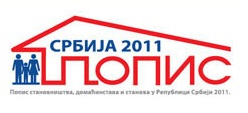
Logo of the 2011 Census

Serbia has a well-established tradition of conducting censuses.

The first census was conducted in 1834 in the Principality of Serbia. The subsequent censuses were conducted in 1841, 1843, 1846, 1850, 1854, 1859, 1863, 1866, and 1874. The 1866 Census is considered the first modern census, the one that covered the entire population of the country. The 1874 Census was more extensive and the collected data were presented in lower territorial units (municipalities and districts). In 1878, Serbia received international recognition of independence, with the territory extended to the Niš, Pirot, Vranje, and Toplica districts. In order to determine the number of people and taxpayers in the new regions, a partial census was carried out in 1879. During the period of the Kingdom of Serbia, six censuses were conducted: in 1884, 1890, 1895, 1900, 1905, and 1910.

In the period between the two world wars, only two censuses were carried out, in 1921 and 1931. The next census was planned for 1941, but due to the World War II it was not conducted. Due to the need to collect data on the damage caused by the destruction of the war in the shortest possible time, in 1948 the so-called "shortened" and in 1953 the first complete post-war census was conducted. Starting from the 1961 census, in accordance with the recommendations from the United Nations, the ten-year periodicals were established, so the following censuses were conducted in 1961, 1971, 1981, and 1991, respectively.

The first census in the 21st century, planned for 2001, was postponed to 2002, due to budget crisis. Due to the COVID pandemic the last census, planned for 2021, was postponed and conducted in 2022.

== 19th century ==
=== 1834 Census (Principality of Serbia) ===
Total population: 678,192

=== 1841 Census (Principality of Serbia) ===
Total population: 828,895

=== 1843 Census (Principality of Serbia) ===
Total population: 859,545

=== 1846 Census (Principality of Serbia) ===
Total population: 915,080

=== 1850 Census (Principality of Serbia) ===
Total population: 956,893

=== 1854 Census (Principality of Serbia) ===
Total population: 998,919

=== 1859 Census (Principality of Serbia) ===
Total population: 1,078,281

=== 1863 Census (Principality of Serbia) ===
Total population: 1,108,568

=== 1866 Census (Principality of Serbia) ===
Ethnicity	Population	Share
Serbs	1,058,189	87.0%
Vlachs	127,545	10.5%
Roma	24,607	2.0%
Others	5,845	0.5%
Total	1,216,219 (Note: According to Milan Milićević, based on statistical studies conducted that year by the statistician Vladimir Jakšić (1824–1899) and published in Glasnik, as well as on data presented in the Almanach de Gotha, the Principality of Serbia had a population of 1,216,346.)	

=== 1875 Census (Principality of Serbia) ===
Total population: 1,352,522

=== 1884 Census (Kingdom of Serbia) ===
Ethnicity	Population	Share
Serbs	1,693,337	89.0%
Vlachs	149,727	9.7%
Roma	34,066	1.8%
Others	24,206	1.2%
Total	1,901,336	

=== 1890 Census (Kingdom of Serbia) ===
Ethnicity	Population	Share
Serbs	1,955,944	90.4%
Vlachs	143,684	6.6%
Roma	37,581	1.7%
Others	24,752	1.1%
Total	2,161,961	

=== 1895 Census (Kingdom of Serbia) ===
Total population: 2,341,675

== 20th century ==
=== 1900 Census (Kingdom of Serbia) ===
Language	Speakers	Share
Serbian	2,298,551	92.2%
Romanian	89,873	3.6%
Romani	46,148	1.8%
Other	58,310	2.3%
Total	2,492,882	

=== 1905 Census (Kingdom of Serbia) ===
Total population: 2,754,859

=== 1910 Census (Kingdom of Serbia) ===
Language	Speakers	Share
Serbian	2,778,706	95.1%
Other	143,552	4.9%
Total	2,922,058	

=== 1948 census (People's Republic of Serbia) ===
Ethnicity	Population	Share
Serbs	4,823,730	73.9%
Albanians	532,011	8.1%
Hungarians	433,701	6.6%
Croats	169,864	2.6%
Vlachs	93,440	1.4%
Montenegrins	74,860	1.1%
Slovaks	72,032	1.1%
Romanians	63,130	0.9%
Bulgarians	59,395	0.9%
Roma	52,181	0.8%
Germans	41,460	0.6%
Rusyns-Ukrainians	22,667	0.3%
Slovenes	20,998	0.3%
Macedonians	17,917	0.2%
Muslims-undeclared	17,315	0.2%
Russians	13,329	0.2%
Others	19,567	0.3%
Unknown	369	0.005%
Total	6,527,966	

Note: in 1948 Census, Muslims of South Slavic ethnic origin were not recognized as a distinct ethnicity and had no separate census category for themselves to declare; they were provided with the following possible categories to declare: "Serb-Muslim", "Croat-Muslim" or "Muslim-undeclared", with Serb-Muslims being categorized in the census results as Serbs, Croats-Muslims as Croats, while Muslims-undeclared were counted separately.

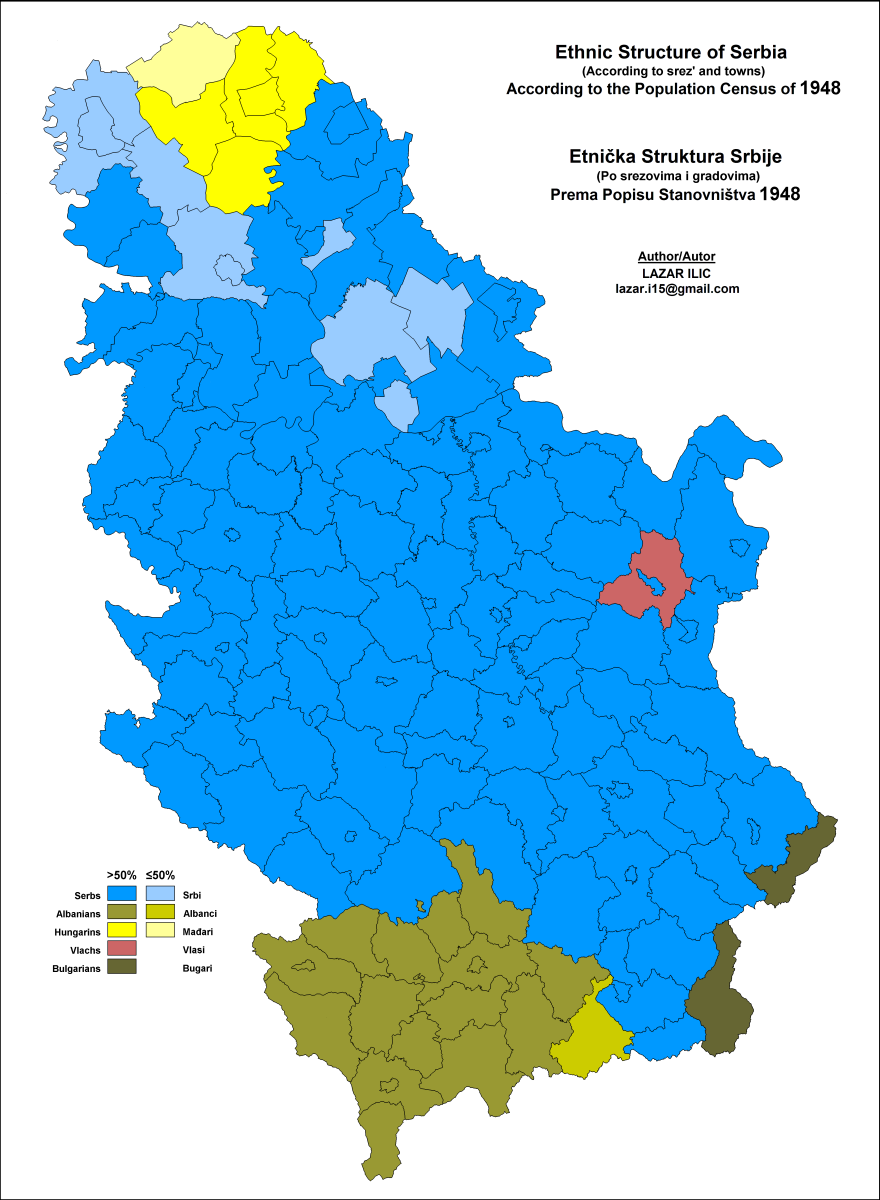
Ethnic map of Serbia by municipalities, 1948

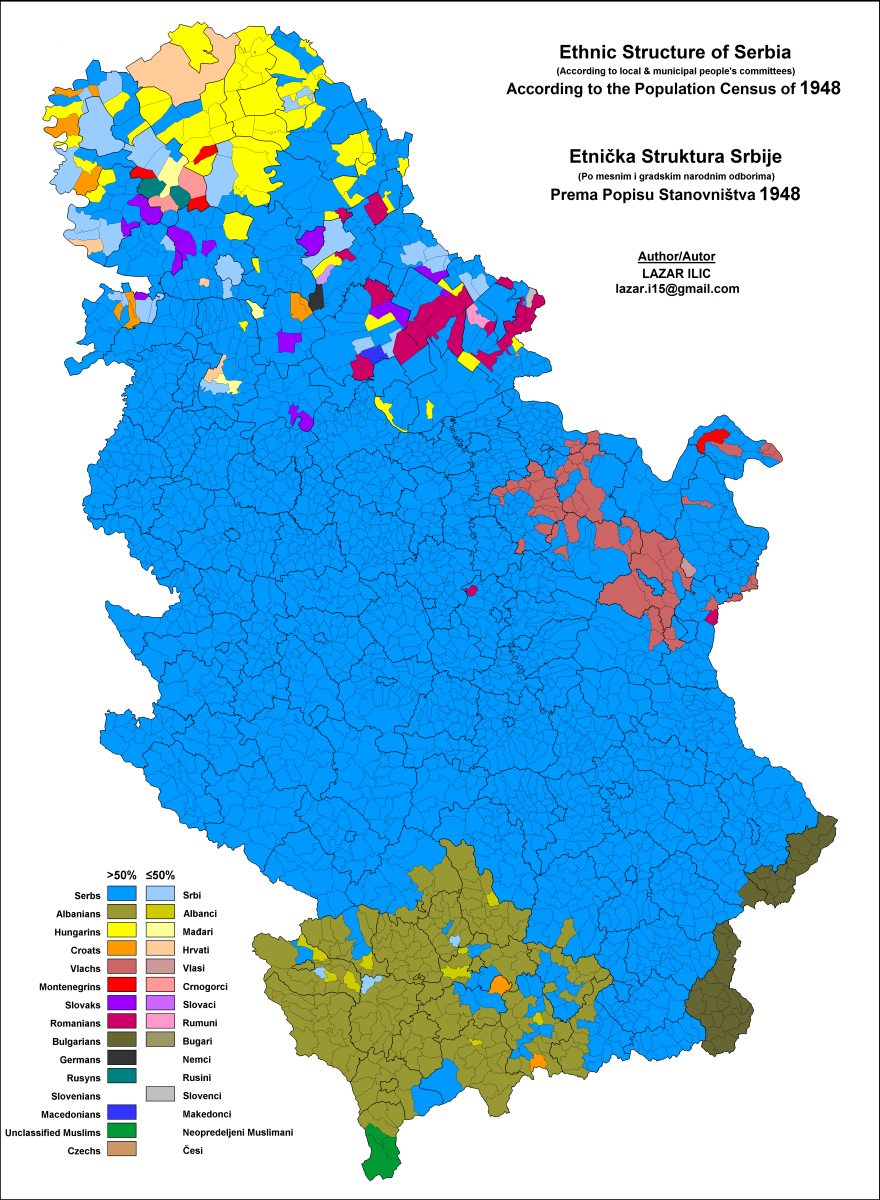
Ethnic map of Serbia by settlements, 1948

=== 1953 Census (People's Republic of Serbia) ===
Ethnicity	Population	Share
Serbs	5,152,939	73.8%
Albanians	565,513	8.1%
Hungarians	441,907	6.3%
Croats	173,246	2.5%
Montenegrins	86,061	1.2%
Yugoslavs-undeclared	81,081	1.1%
Slovaks	75,027	1.0%
Bulgarians	60,146	0.8%
Romanians	59,705	0.8%
Roma	58,800	0.8%
Germans	46,228	0.6%
Vlachs	28,047	0.4%
Macedonians	27,277	0.4%
Rusyns-Ukrainians	23,720	0.3%
Slovenes	20,717	0.3%
Others	22,220	0.3%
Unknown	1,994	0.03%
Total	6,979,154	

Note: in 1953 Census, Muslims of South Slavic ethnic origin were not recognized as a distinct ethnicity and had no separate census category for themselves to declare; they were categorized as "Yugoslavs-undeclared".

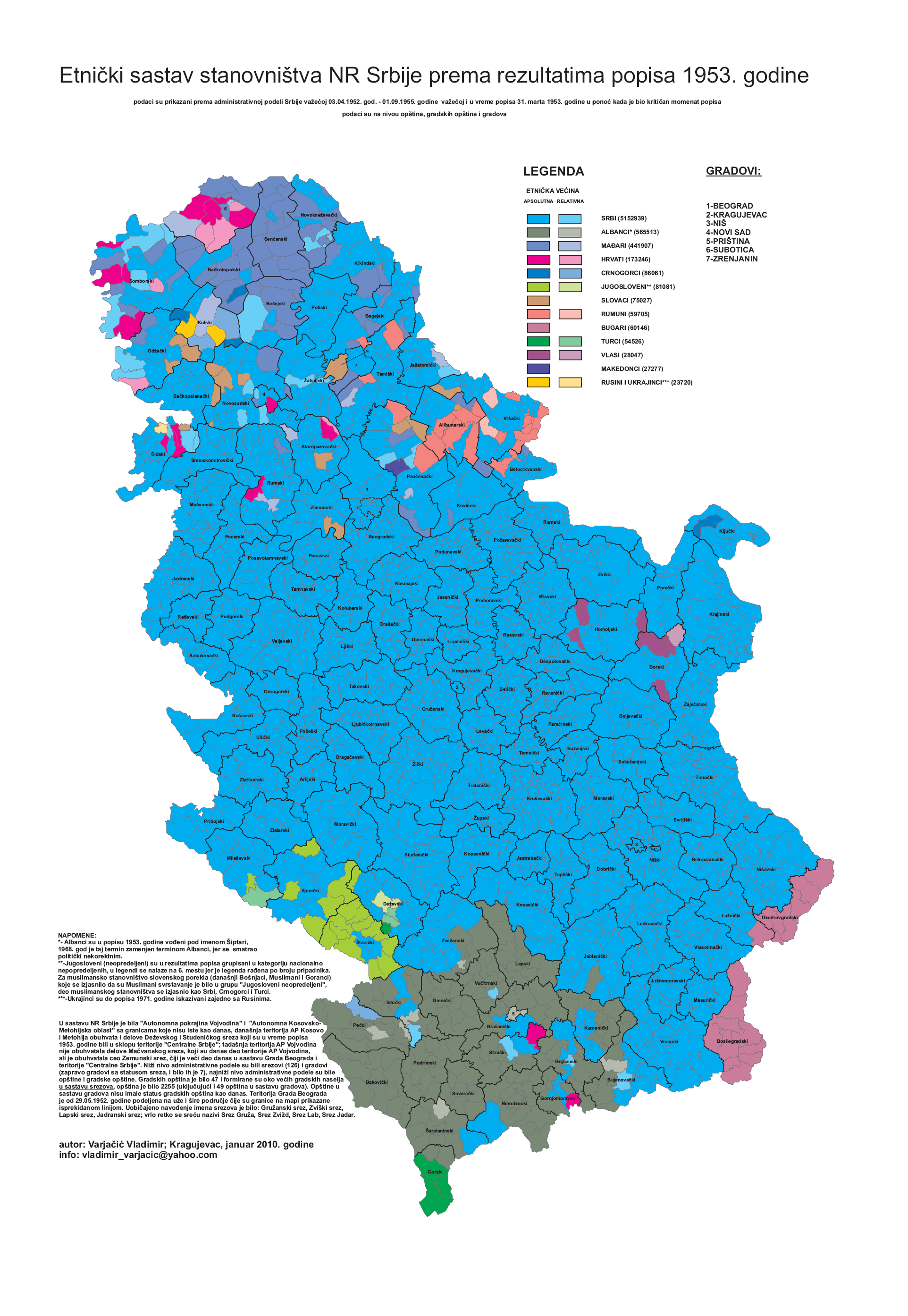
Ethnic map of Serbia by settlements, 1953

=== 1961 Census (People's Republic of Serbia) ===
Ethnicity	Population	Share
Serbs	5,704,686	74.6%
Albanians	699,772	9.1%
Hungarians	449,587	5.9%
Croats	196,409	2.5%
Montenegrins	104,753	1.3%
ethnic Muslims	93,467	1.2%
Slovaks	77,837	1.0%
Romanians	59,505	0.8%
Bulgarians	58,494	0.7%
Turks	44,434	0.6%
Macedonians	36,288	0.4%
Rusyns-Ukrainians	25,658	0.3%
Yugoslavs	20,079	0.2%
Slovenes	19,957	0.2%
Germans	14,533	0.2%
Roma	9,826	0.1%
Others	21,347	0.2%
Unknown	5,604	0.07%
Total	7,642,227	

Note: in 1961 Census, Muslims of South Slavic ethnic origin were not recognized as a distinct ethnicity and had no separate census category for themselves to declare; they were categorized as "ethnic Muslims".

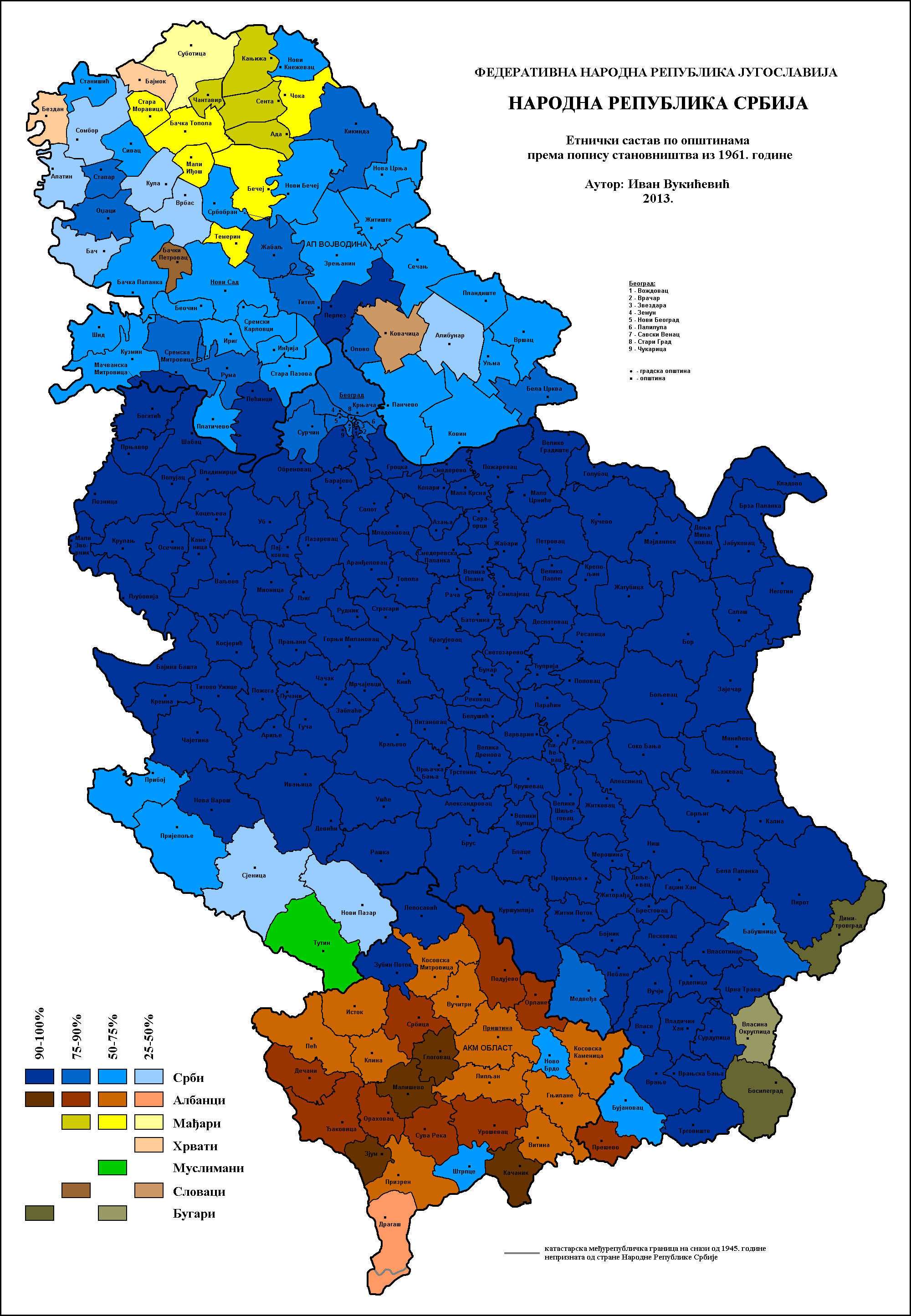
Ethnic map of Serbia by municipalities, 1961

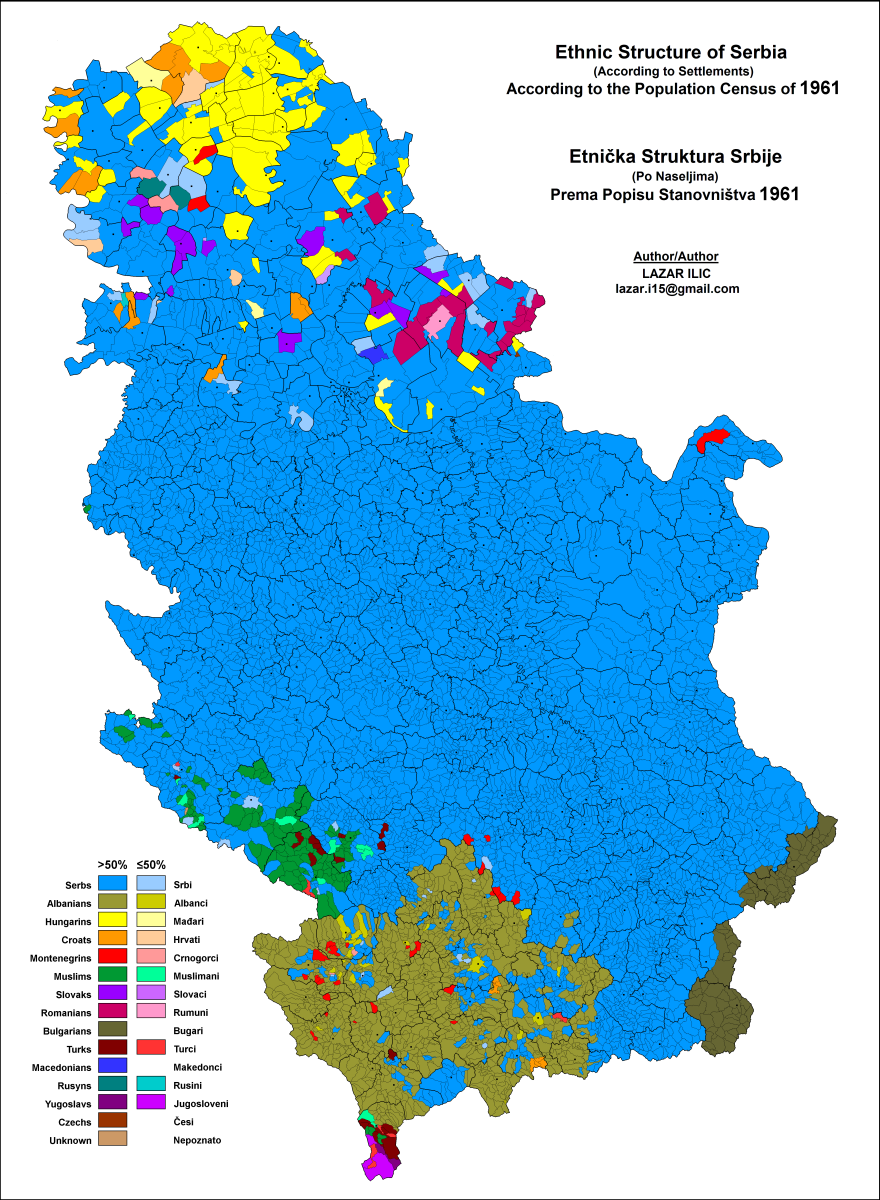
Ethnic map of Serbia by settlements, 1961

=== 1971 Census (Socialist Republic of Serbia) ===
Ethnicity	Population	Share
Serbs	6,016,811	71.2%
Albanians	984,761	11.6%
Hungarians	430,314	5.1%
Croats	184,913	2.2%
ethnic Muslims	154,330	1.8%
Montenegrins	125,260	1.5%
Yugoslavs	123,824	1.4%
Slovaks	76,733	0.9%
Romanians	57,419	0.7%
Bulgarians	53,800	0.6%
Roma	49,894	0.6%
Macedonians	42,675	0.5%
Rusyns	20,608	0.2%
Turks	18,220	0.2%
Slovenes	15,957	0.2%
Vlachs	14,724	0.1%
Germans	9,086	0.1%
Others	22,093	0.2%
Regional identity	10,409	0.1%
Undeclared	4,486	0.05%
Unknown	30,274	0.3%
Total	8,446,591	

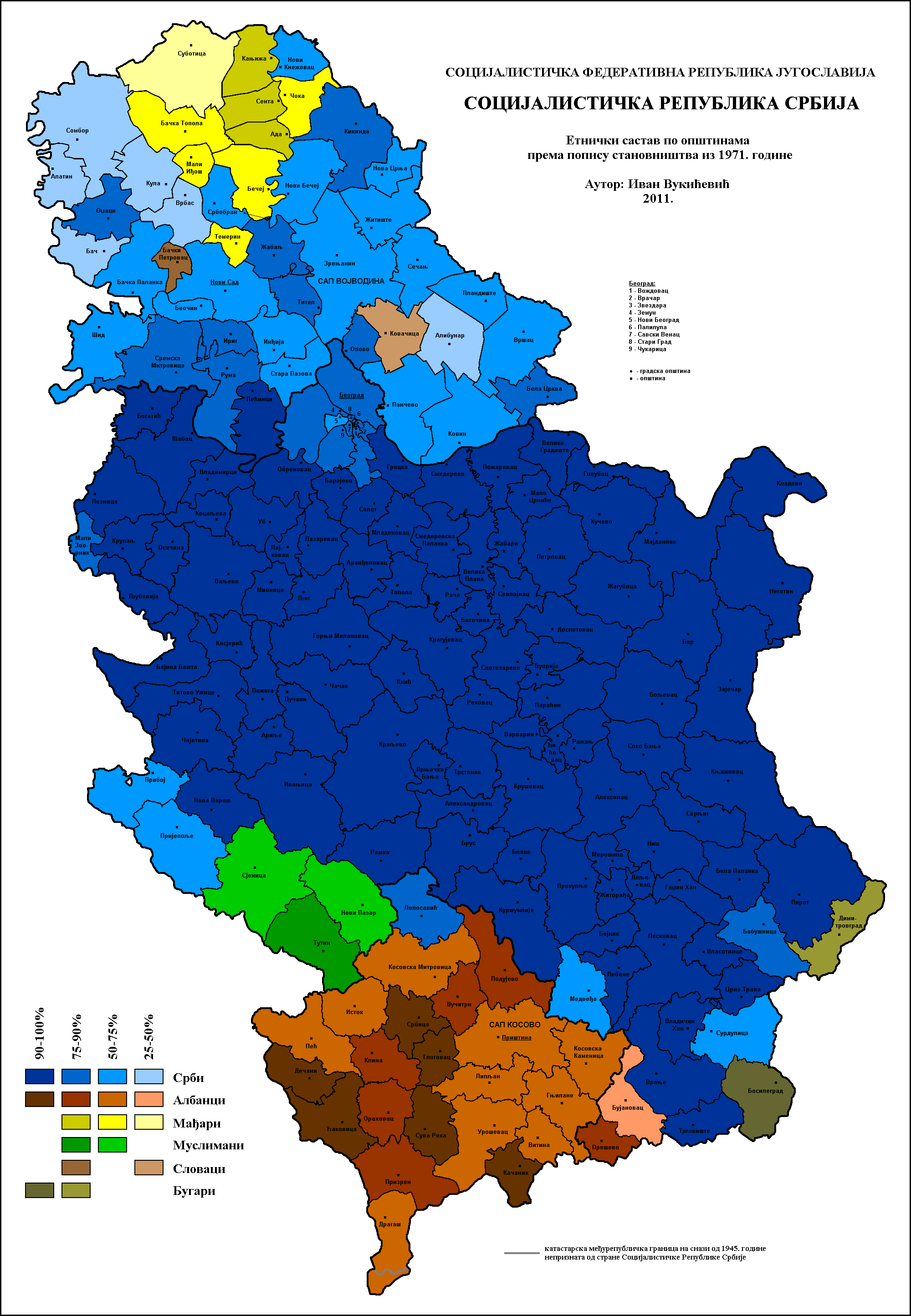
Ethnic map of Serbia by municipalities, 1971

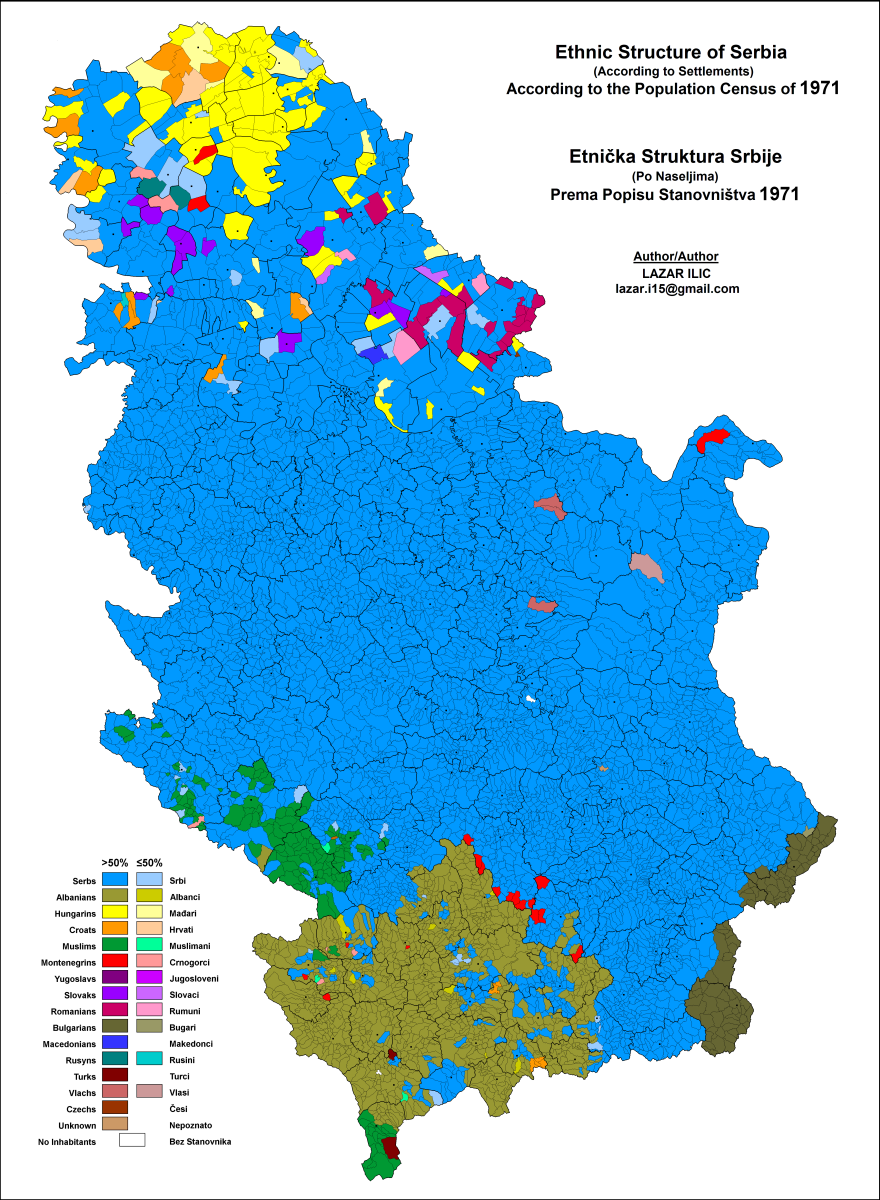
Ethnic map of Serbia by settlements, 1971

=== 1981 Census (Socialist Republic of Serbia) ===
Ethnicity	Population	Share
Serbs	6,182,155	66.4%
Albanians	1,303,034	14.0%
Yugoslavs	441,941	4.7%
Hungarians	390,468	4.2%
ethnic Muslims	215,166	2.3%
Croats	149,368	1.6%
Montenegrins	147,466	1.6%
Roma	110,956	1.2%
Slovaks	73,207	0.8%
Romanians	53,693	0.6%
Macedonians	48,986	0.5%
Bulgarians	33,455	0.3%
Vlachs	25,596	0.2%
Rusyns	19,757	0.2%
Turks	13,890	0.1%
Slovenes	12,006	0.1%
Others	34,624	0.3%
Regional identity	6,848	0.07%
Undeclared	7,834	0.08%
Unknown	43,223	0.4%
Total	9,313,676	

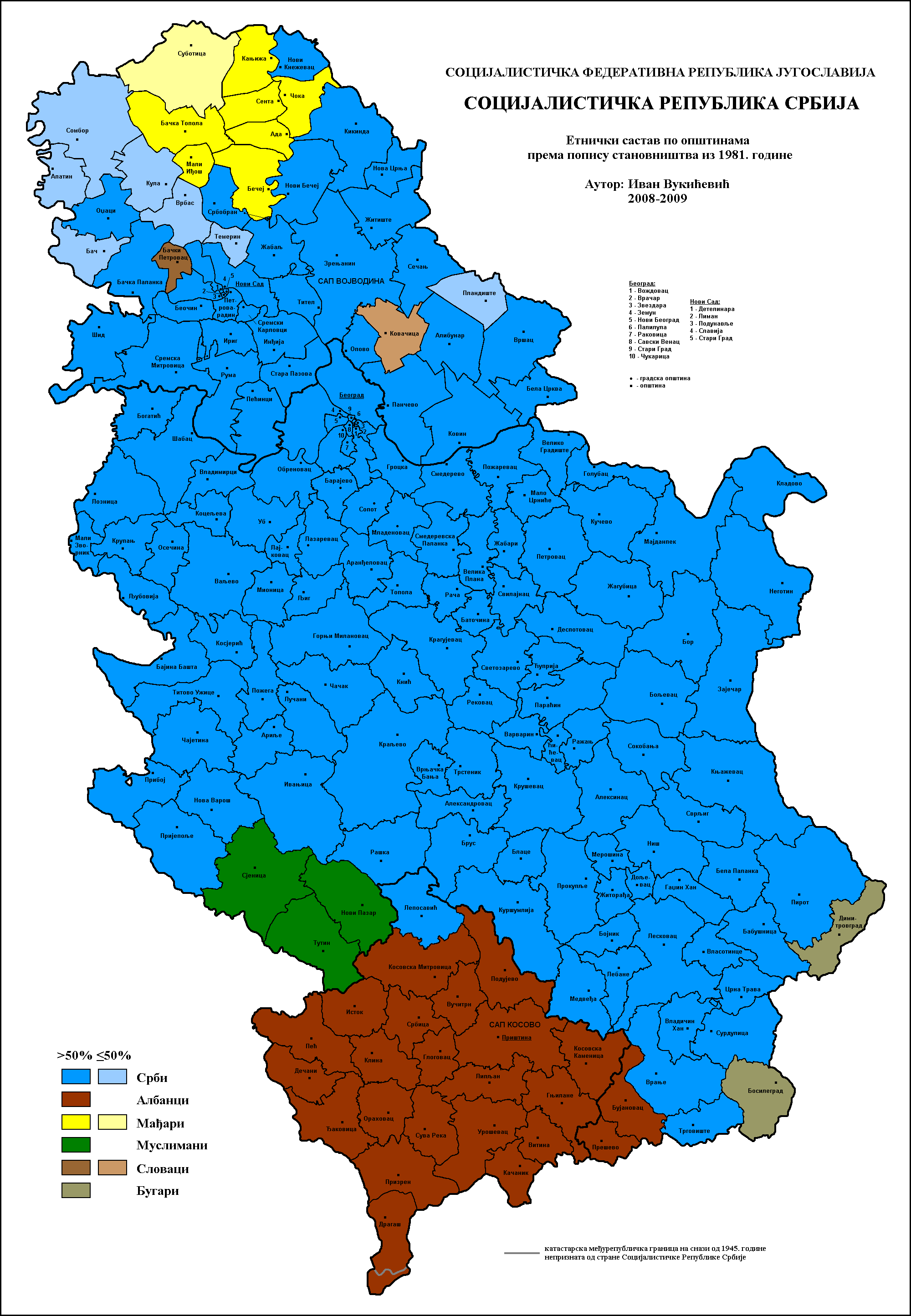
Ethnic map of Serbia by municipalities, 1981

=== 1991 Census (Republic of Serbia) ===
==== Data including Kosovo ====
Ethnicity	Population	Share
Serbs	6,446,595	65.9%
Albanians	1,674,353	17.1%
Hungarians	343,942	3.5%
Yugoslavs	323,625	3.3%
ethnic Muslims	246,411	2.5%
Roma	140,237	1.4%
Montenegrins	139,299	1.4%
Croats	105,406	1.1%
Slovaks	66,798	0.7%
Macedonians	46,046	0.4%
Romanians	42,331	0.4%
Bulgarians	26,876	0.2%
Bunjevci	21,434	0.2%
Rusyns	18,073	0.2%
Vlachs	17,807	0.2%
Turks	11,236	0.1%
Others	42,337	0.4%
Regional identity	4,912	0.05%
Undeclared	10,906	0.1%
Unknown	50,367	0.5%
Total	9,778,991	

Note: ethnic Albanians largely boycotted 1991 Census; their figure is an official estimation by the Statistical Office of the Republic of Serbia.

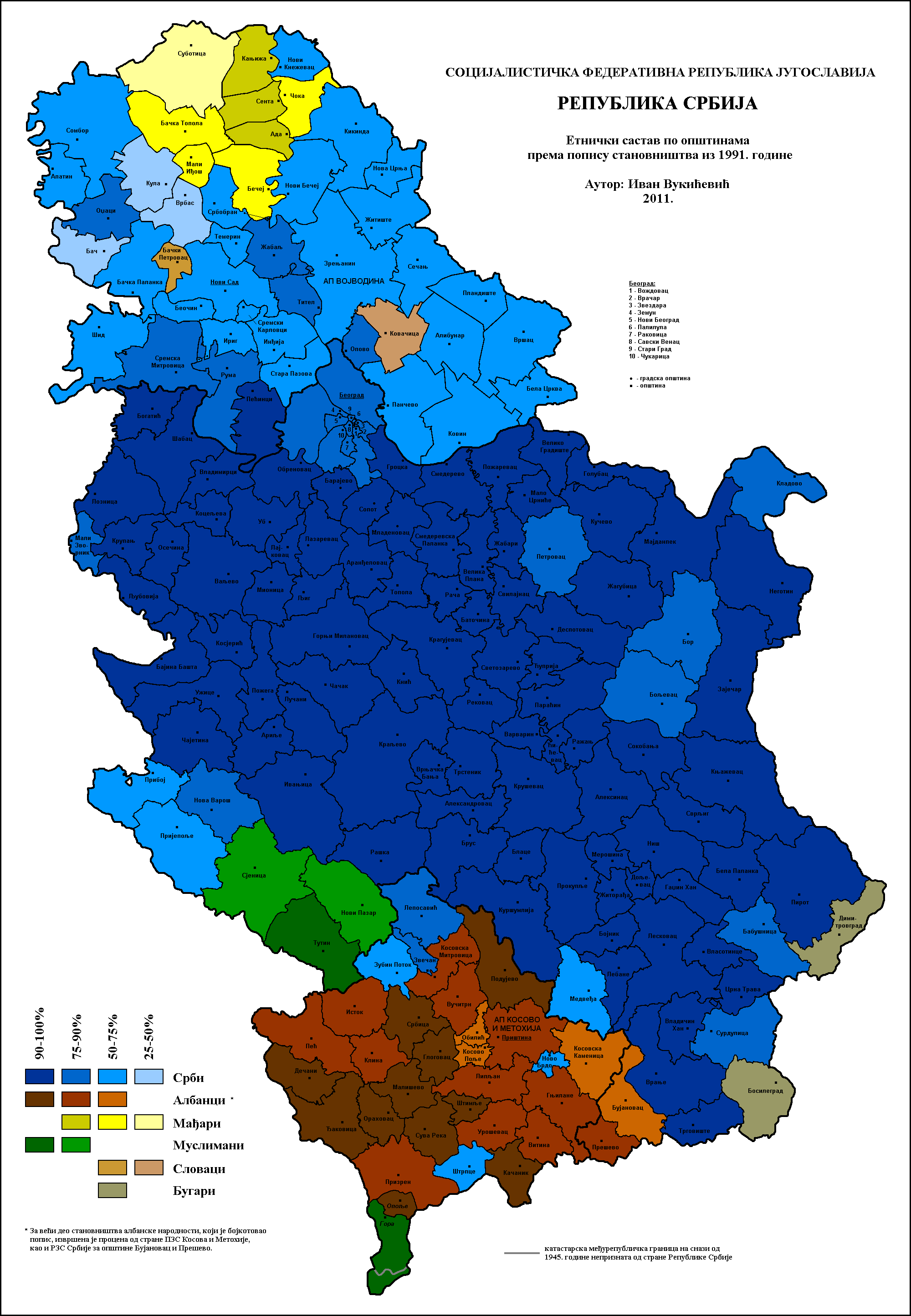
Ethnic map of Serbia by municipalities, 1991

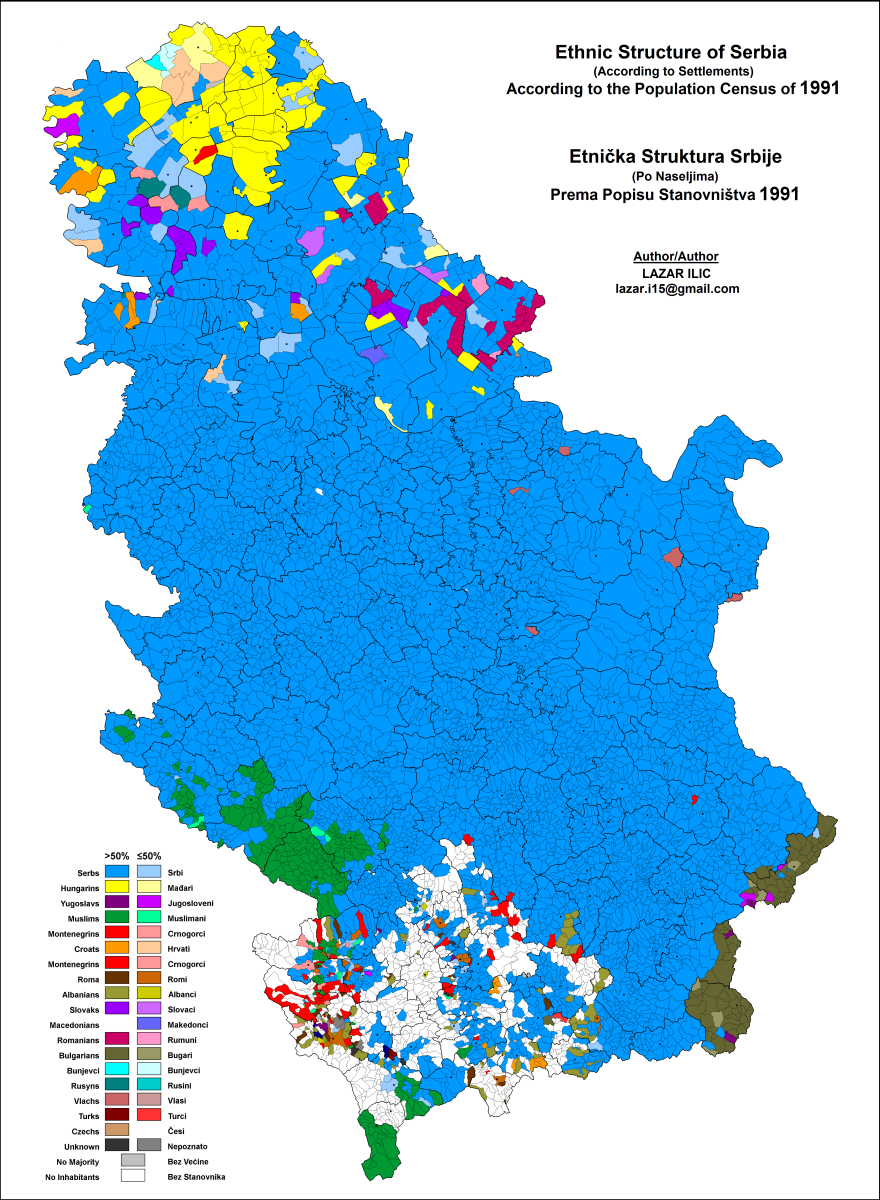
Ethnic map of Serbia by settlements, 1991

==== Data excluding Kosovo ====
Ethnicity	Population	Share
Serbs	6,252,405	79.9%
Hungarians	343,800	4.4%
Yugoslavs	320,186	4.1%
ethnic Muslims	180,222	2.3%
Montenegrins	118,934	1.5%
Croats	97,344	1.2%
Roma	94,491	1.2%
Albanians	78,281	1.0%
Slovaks	66,772	0.8%
Macedonians	45,068	0.6%
Romanians	42,316	0.5%
Bulgarians	26,698	0.3%
Bunjevci	21,434	0.3%
Rusyns	18,073	0.2%
Vlachs	17,804	0.2%
Turks	11,236	0.1%
Others	39,740	0.5%
Regional identity	4,841	0.06%
Undeclared	10,538	0.1%
Unknown	47,949	0.6%
Total	7,822,795	

Note: ethnic Albanians largely boycotted 1991 Census; their figure is an official estimation by the Statistical Office of the Republic of Serbia.

== 21st century ==
=== 2002 Census (Republic of Serbia; excluding Kosovo) ===
Ethnicity	Population	Share
Serbs	6,212,838	82.8%
Hungarians	293,299	4.4%
Bosniaks	136,087	1.8%
Roma	108,193	1.4%
Yugoslavs	80,721	1.1%
Croats	70,602	0.9%
Montenegrins	69,049	0.5%
Albanians	61,647	0.8%
Slovaks	59,021	0.8%
Vlachs	40,054	0.5%
Romanians	34,576	0.4%
Macedonians	25,847	0.3%
Bulgarians	20,497	0.2%
Bunjevci	20,012	0.2%
ethnic Muslims	19,503	0.2%
Rusyns	15,905	0.2%
Others	32,862	0.4%
Regional identity	11,485	0.1%
Undeclared	107,732	1.4%
Unknown	75,483	1.0%
Total	7,498,001	

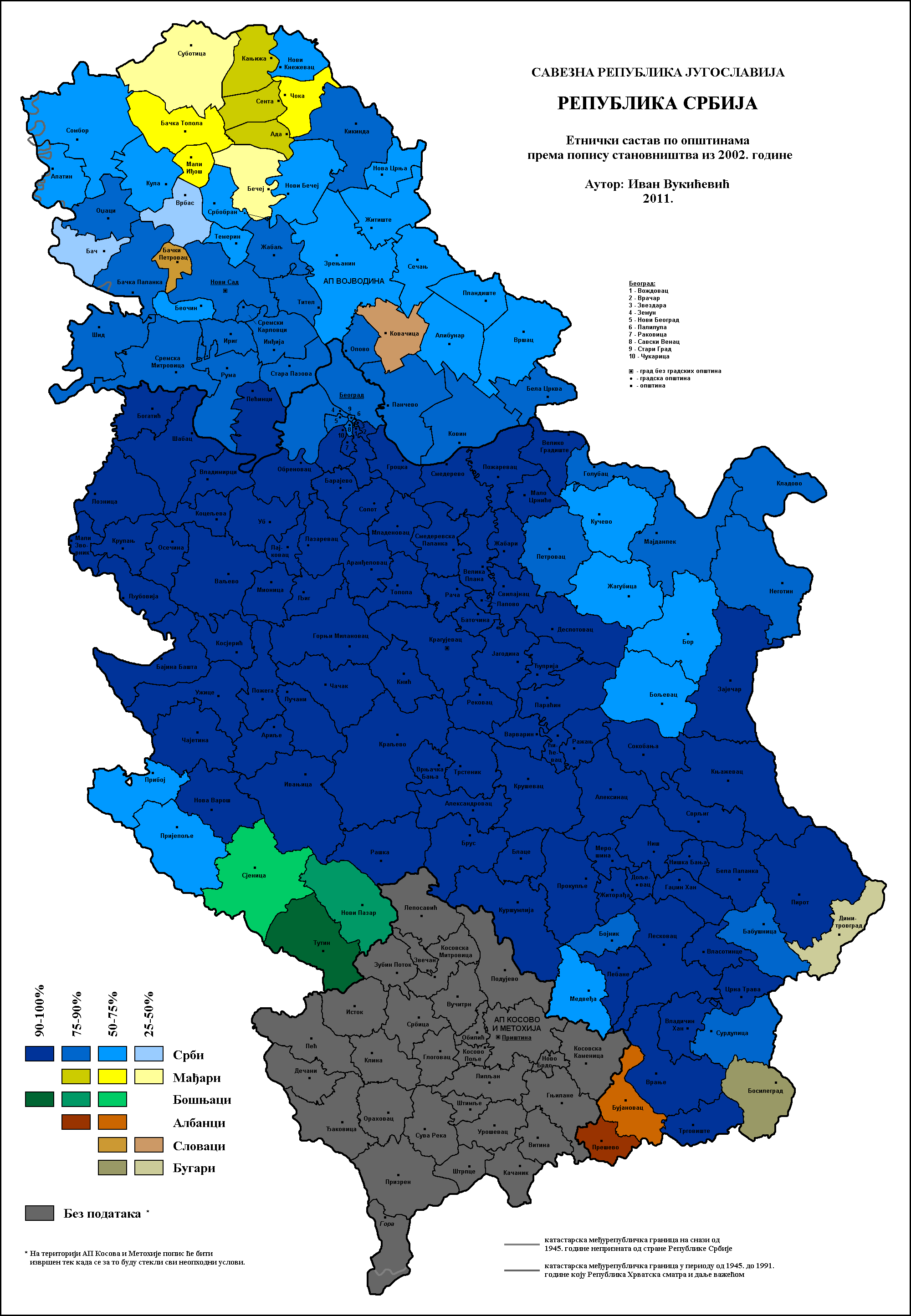
Ethnic map of Serbia by municipalities, 2002

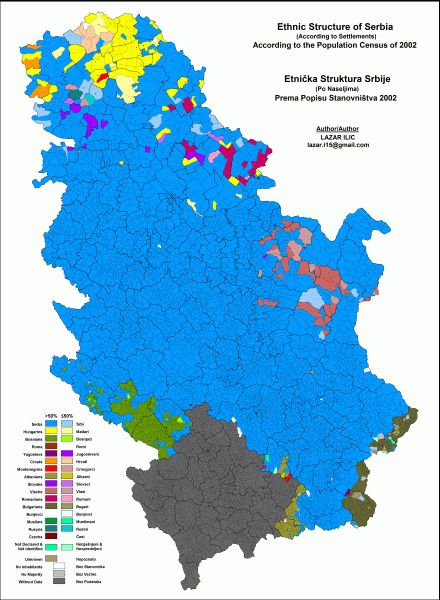
Ethnic map of Serbia by settlements, 2002

=== 2011 Census (Republic of Serbia; excluding Kosovo) ===
Ethnicity	Population	Share
Serbs	5,988,150	82.8%
Hungarians	253,899	3.5%
Roma	147,604	2.0%
Bosniaks	145,278	2.0%
Croats	57,900	0.8%
Slovaks	52,750	0.7%
Albanians	52,566	0.7%
Montenegrins	38,527	0.5%
Vlachs	35,330	0.5%
Romanians	29,332	0.4%
Yugoslavs	23,303	0.3%
Macedonians	22,755	0.3%
ethnic Muslims	22,301	0.3%
Bulgarians	18,543	0.2%
Bunjevci	16,706	0.2%
Rusyns	14,246	0.2%
Others	38,325	0.5%
Regional identity	30,771	0.4%
Undeclared	160,346	2.2%
Unknown	81,740	1.1%
Total	7,233,619	

Note: ethnic Albanians largely boycotted 2011 Census; their figure is an official estimation by the Statistical Office of the Republic of Serbia.

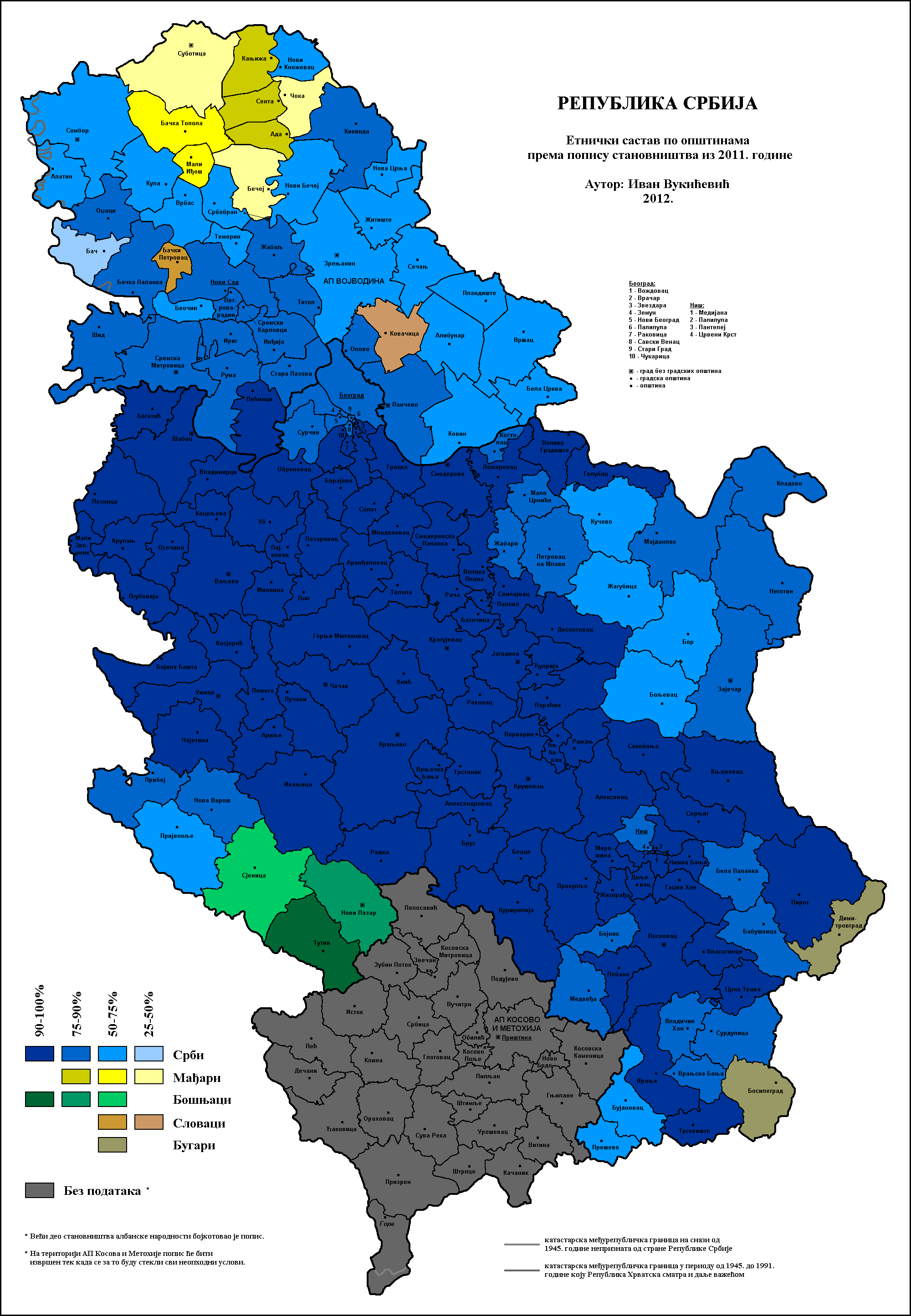
Ethnic map of Serbia by municipalities, 2011

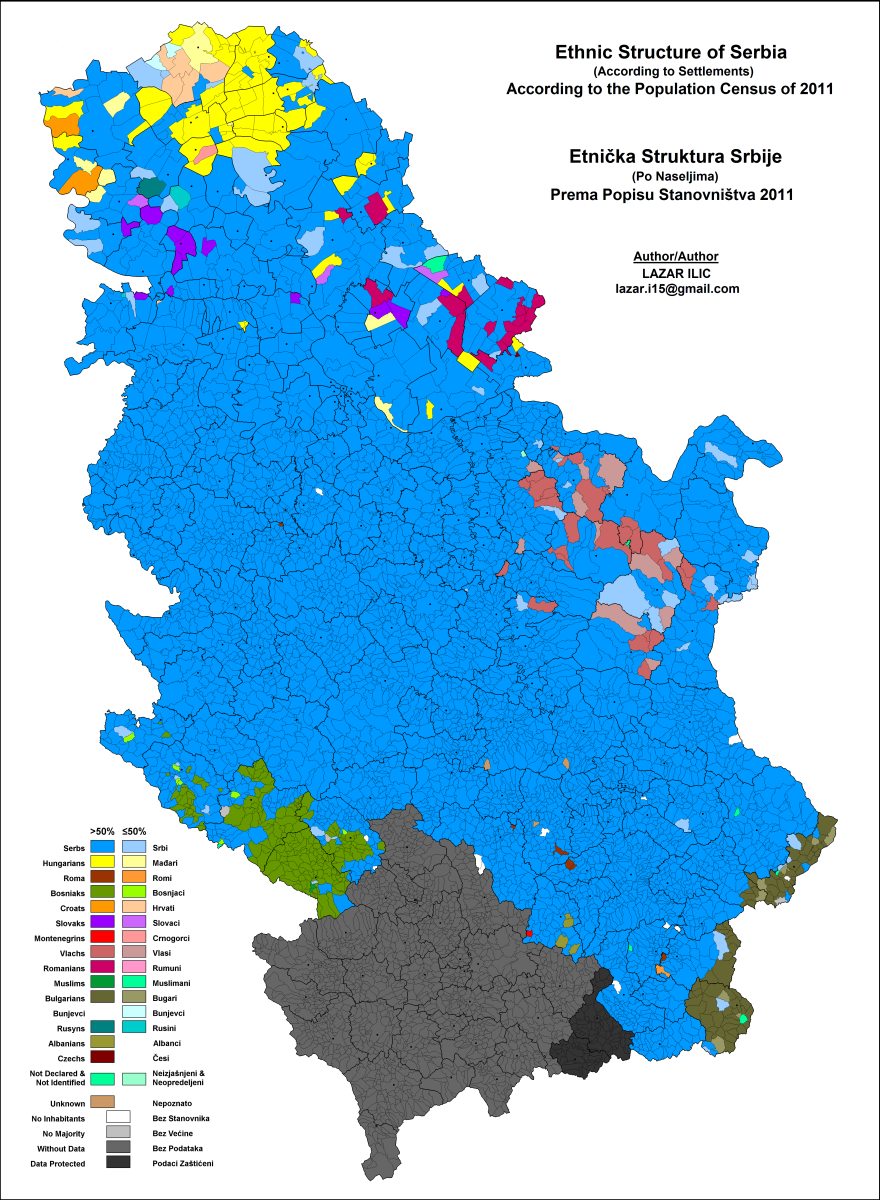
Ethnic map of Serbia by settlements, 2011

=== 2022 Census (Republic of Serbia; excluding Kosovo) ===
Ethnicity	Population	Share
Serbs	5,360,239	80.6%
Hungarians	184,442	2.7%
Bosniaks	153,801	2.3%
Roma	131,936	2.0%
Albanians	61,687	0.9%
Slovaks	41,730	0.6%
Croats	39,107	0.6%
Yugoslavs	27,143	0.4%
Romanians	23,044	0.3%
Vlachs	21,013	0.3%
Montenegrins	20,238	0.3%
Macedonians	14,767	0.2%
ethnic Muslims	13,011	0.2%
Bulgarians	12,918	0.2%
Rusyns	11,483	0.1%
Bunjevci	11,104	0.1%
Russians	10,486	0.1%
Others	21,197	0.3%
Regional identity	11,929	0.1%
Undeclared	136,198	2.0%
Unknown	322,013	4.8%
Total	6,647,003	

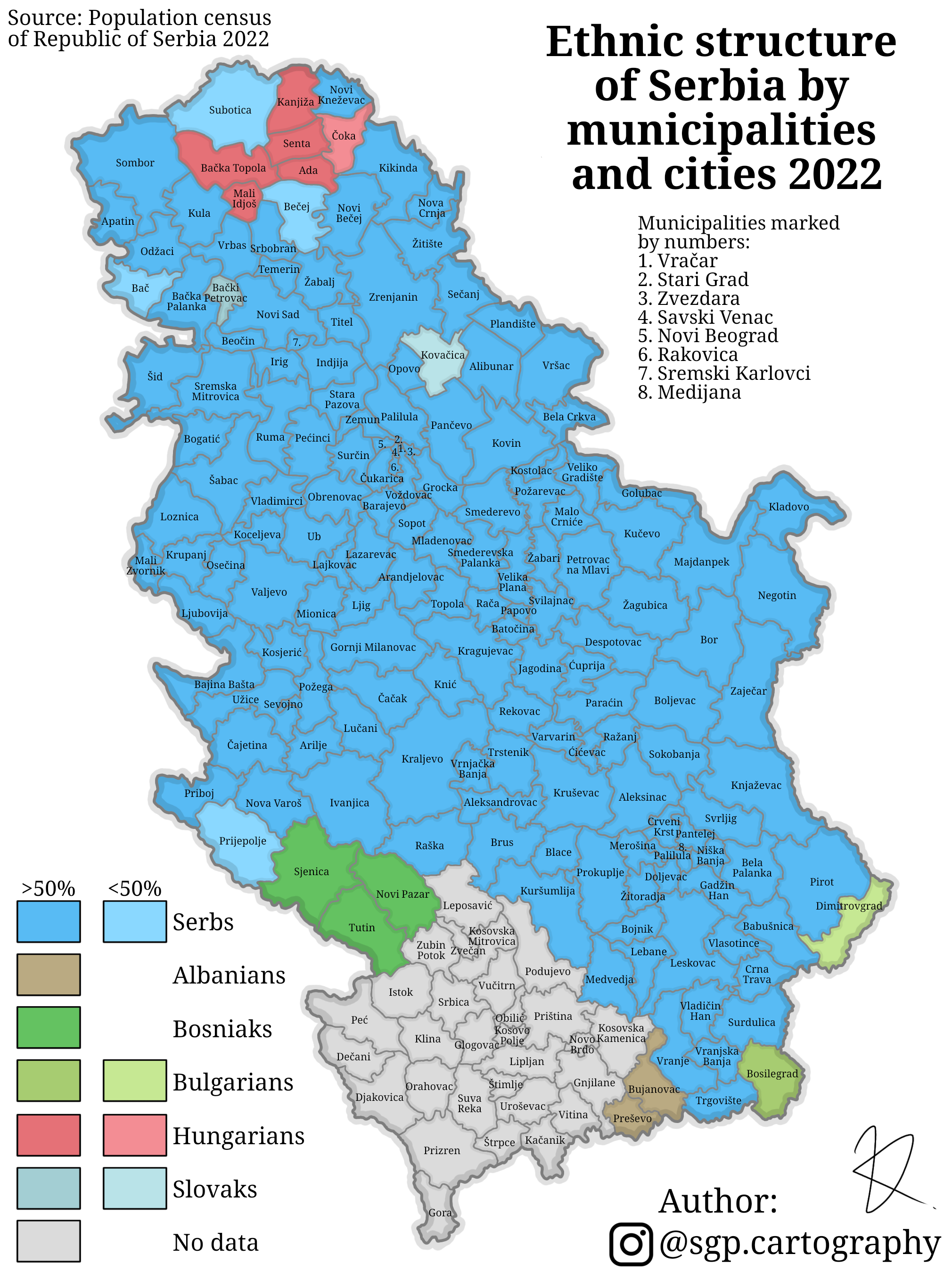
Ethnic map of Serbia by municipalities, 2022

== See also ==
- Demographic history of Vojvodina
- Demographic history of Belgrade
- Demographics of Serbia

== Sources ==
- Milićević, Milan Đ. (1876). Кнежевина Србија: географија, орографија, хидрографија, топографија, аркеологија, историја, етнографија, статистика, просвета, култура, управа [Principality of Serbia]. U državnoj štampariji – via Google Books.
- Републички завод за статистику (2022), ПОПИСИ СТАНОВНИШТВА У КНЕЖЕВИНИ СРБИЈИ (1815–1882) (PDF), Република Србија: Републички завод за статистику
