= Demographics of Belgrade =

- Population pyramid of the City of Belgrade (Belgrade oblast as statistical category) in 2021
- Population: 1,681,405 (2022)

According to the 2022 census, the population of Belgrade city proper stands at 1,197,114, its contiguous urban area has 1,298,661 inhabitants, while population of city's administrative area (which roughly corresponds to its metro area) totals 1,681,405 people.

== Settlements ==
Settlement	Population
Belgrade proper^{a}	1,197,714
Borča^{a}	51,862
Kaluđerica^{a}	28,483
Lazarevac	27,635
Obrenovac	25,380
Mladenovac	22,346
Surčin^{a}	20,602
Sremčica	19,434
Ugrinovci	11,859
Leštane	10,454
Ripanj	10,084
^{a} part of contiguous urban area

== Ethnicity ==
=== Belgrade proper ===
Ethnicity	Population	Share
Serbs	1,016,348	84.8%
Roma	13,302	1.1%
Yugoslavs	9,565	0.8%
Montenegrins	4,480	0.3%
Russians	4,238	0.3%
Croats	3,801	0.3%
Macedonians	3,307	0.2%
Gorani	2,867	0.2%
ethnic Muslims	1,984	0.1%
Bosniaks	1,257	0.1%
Hungarians	1,077	0.09%
Slovenes	961	0.08%
Albanians	699	0.06%
Bulgarians	597	0.05%
Slovaks	582	0.05%
Romanians	476	0.04%
Ukrainians	359	0.03%
Germans	268	0.02%
Vlachs	237	0.02%
Rusyns	189	0.01%
Bunjevci	106	0.01%
Others	7,496	0.6%
Regional identity	831	0.07%
Undeclared	25,002	2.1%
Unknown	97,665	8.1%

=== Belgrade administrative area ===
Ethnicity	Population	Share
Serbs	1,449,241	86.2%
Roma	23,160	1.4%
Yugoslavs	10,499	0.6%
Gorani	5,249	0.3%
Montenegrins	5,134	0.3%
Russians	4,659	0.3%
Croats	4,554	0.2%
Macedonians	4,293	0.2%
ethnic Muslims	2,718	0.1%
Slovaks	1,656	0.1%
Bosniaks	1,515	0.09%
Hungarians	1,386	0.08%
Romanians	1,064	0.06%
Slovenes	1,050	0.06%
Albanians	932	0.06%
Bulgarians	889	0.05%
Vlachs	336	0.02%
Ukrainians	458	0.03%
Germans	341	0.02%
Rusyns	215	0.01%
Bunjevci	119	0.01%
Others	8,900	0.5%
Regional identity	1,007	0.06%
Undeclared	30,130	1.8%
Unknown	121,900	7.2%

== Religion ==
Religion	Adherents	Share
Christianity	1,433,602	85.2%
Eastern Orthodoxy	1,412,207	84.0%
Catholicism	9,041	0.5%
Protestantism	2,453	0.1%
Other Christian	9,901	0.6%
Islam	28,210	1.6%
Judaism	365	0.02%
Other	775	0.04%
Atheism	36,766	2.2%
Agnosticism	4,793	0.3%
Undeclared	42,326	2.5%
Unknown	134,568	8.0%

- Note: data for the administrative area of the City of Belgrade

== Language ==
Language	Speakers	Share
Serbian	1,498,612	89.1%
Romani	14,129	0.8%
Russian	5,235	0.3%
Macedonian	3,053	0.2%
Albanian	3,017	0.1%
Croatian	1,783	0.1%
Slovak	1,338	0.08%
Romanian	953	0.05%
Hungarian	902	0.05%
Montenegrin	717	0.04%
Slovene	647	0.04%
Bosnian	612	0.03%
Bulgarian	370	0.02%
German	310	0.02%
Other	2,117	0.1%
Undeclared	25,002	1.5%
Unknown	97,665	5.8%

- Note: data for administrative area of the City of Belgrade

== See also ==
- Demographics of Serbia
- Demographic history of Belgrade
