= Kruščić =

Kruščić Крушчић (Serbian) Veprőd (Hungarian) Крущич (Pannonian Rusyn)
- Village (Selo)
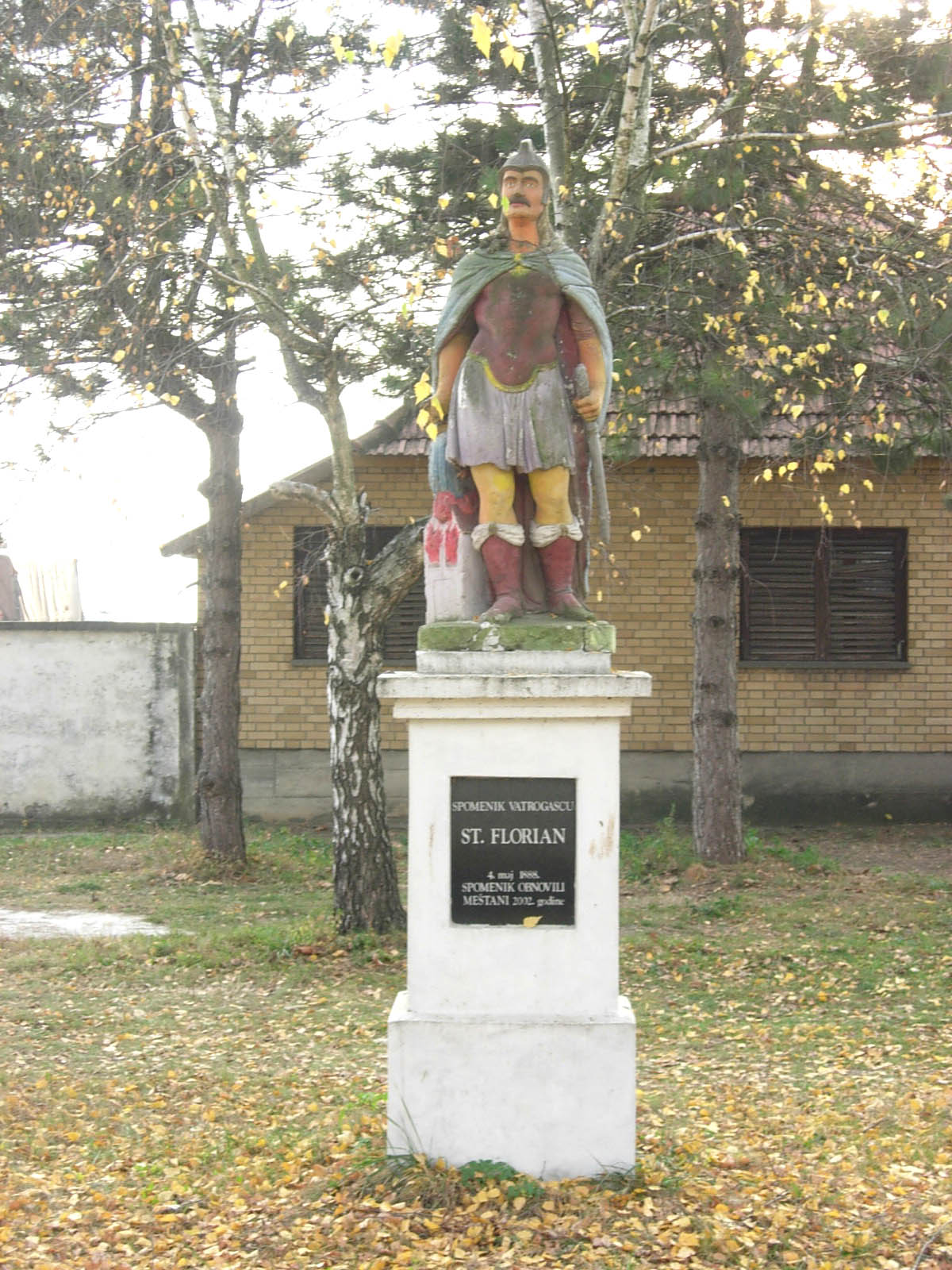
- Statue of Saint Florian

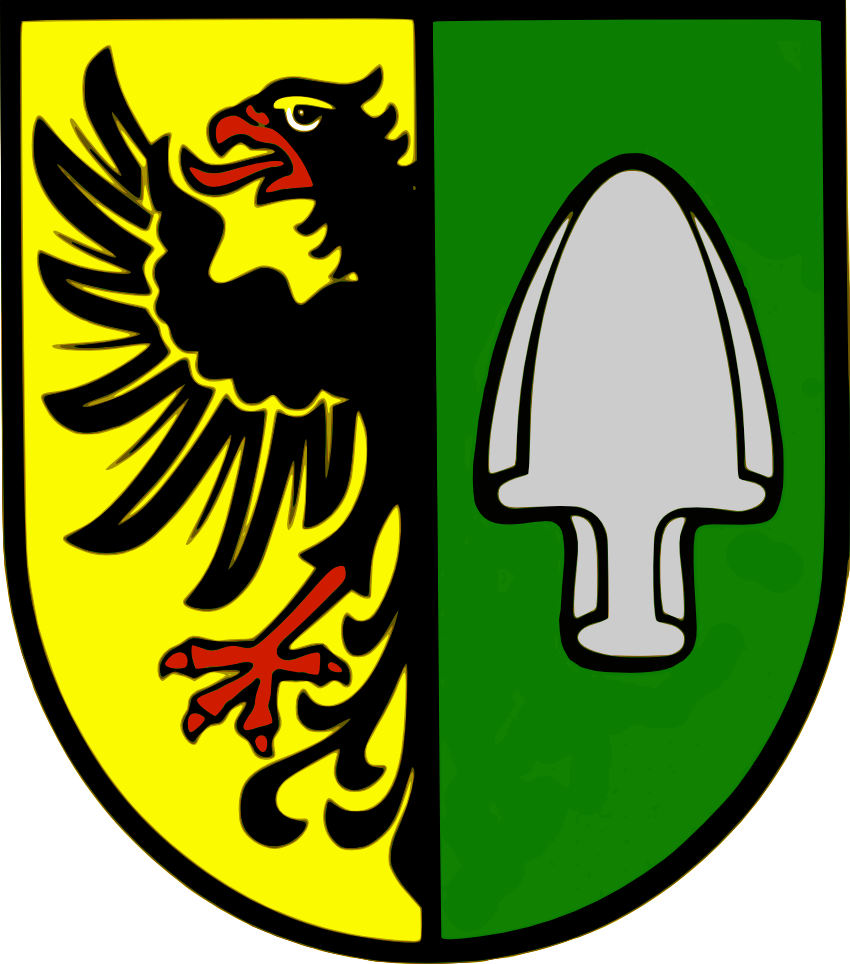
- Seal

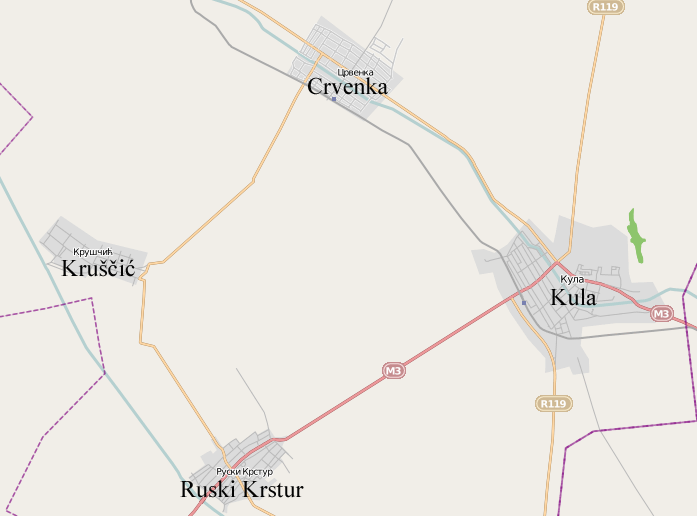
- Map of Kruščić and other settlements in the neighborhood

- Location within Vojvodina Location within Serbia Location within Europe
- Coordinates: 45°37′N 19°22′E
- Country: Serbia
- Province: Vojvodina
- Region: Bačka
- District: West Bačka
- Municipality: Kula

Government
  - Village chief: Radisav Zejak

Population (2022)
  - Total: 1,468
- Time zone: UTC+1 (CET)
  - Summer (DST): UTC+2 (CEST)
- Website: https://naseselokruscic.wordpress.com/

Kruščić (Serbian Cyrillic: Крушчић, Hungarian: Veprőd) is a village in the Kula municipality, West Bačka District, Vojvodina, Serbia. The population of the village is ethnically mixed and numbers 1,468 people (2022 census).

== Name ==
Before the Second World War, the village was called Veprovac (Вепровац) in Serbian, and Вепровач in Pannonian Rusyn, both ultimately deriving from the term for "wild boar" (Serbian вепар / vepar, Rusyn вепер), although possibly sooner connected to Serbian веприна / veprina, "Ruscus aculeatus").

After the war, during colonization, the village was inhabited by colonists, mostly from Kolašin and its surroundings. In 1950, the name of the village was changed to Kruščić, after the national hero from World War II Vukman Kruščić (1909-1942), who was caught and killed on 20 January 1942, along with another 30 or so partisans, by the chetniks of Pavle Đurišić.

In Hungarian, the village is known as "Veprőd", in Ukrainian and Pannonian Rusyn as "Крущич", and in German as "Weprovatz".

== Demographics ==
=== Historical population ===
- 1787: 1,731 (55% Hungarians and Slovaks, 45% Germans)
- 1910: 3,163 (2,458 Germans, 637 Hungarians, 53 Rusyns)
- 1931: 3,158 (2,551 Germans, 489 Hungarians, 118 Slavs)
- 1961: 3,281
- 1971: 2,927
- 1981: 2,658
- 1991: 2,477 (973 Montenegrins, 539 Serbs, 350 Hungarians, 18 Germans)
- 2002: 2,353 (768 Montenegrins, 744 Serbs, 280 Hungarians, 10 Germans)
- 2022: 1,468 (637 Serbs, 236 Montenegrins, 149 Hungarians, 6 Germans)

=== Ethnic groups ===
According to data from the 2022 census, the ethnic groups included are:

- 637 (43.4%) Serbs
- 236 (16%) Montenegrins
- 149 (10.1%) Hungarians
- 108 (7.3%) Ukrainians
- 57 (3.9%) Rusyns
- 37 (2.5%) Croats
- Others/Undeclared/Unknown

== Gallery ==
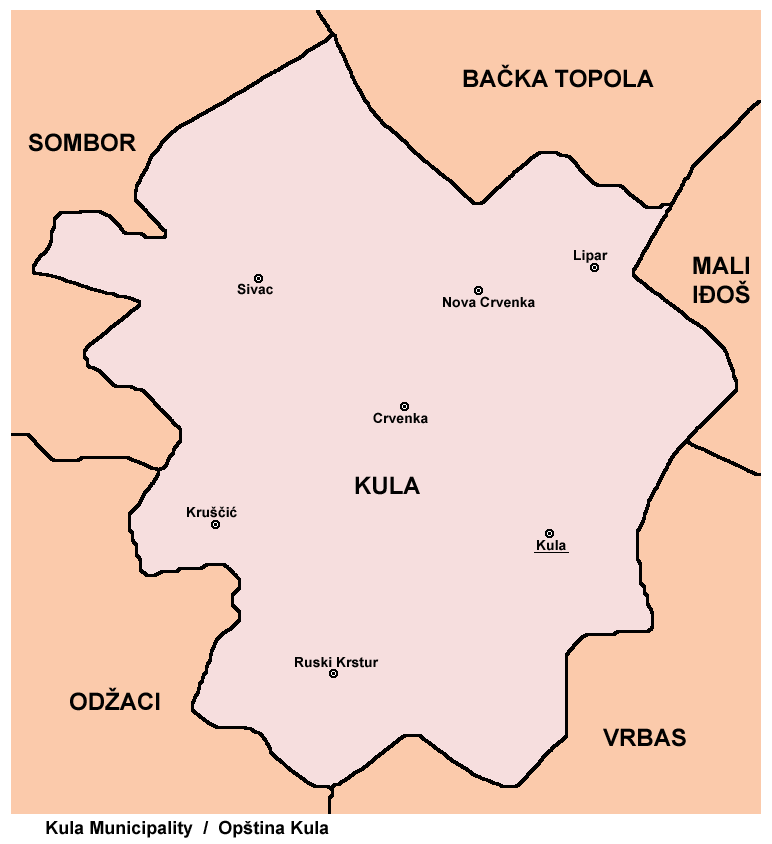
Map of the Kula municipality showing the location of the village

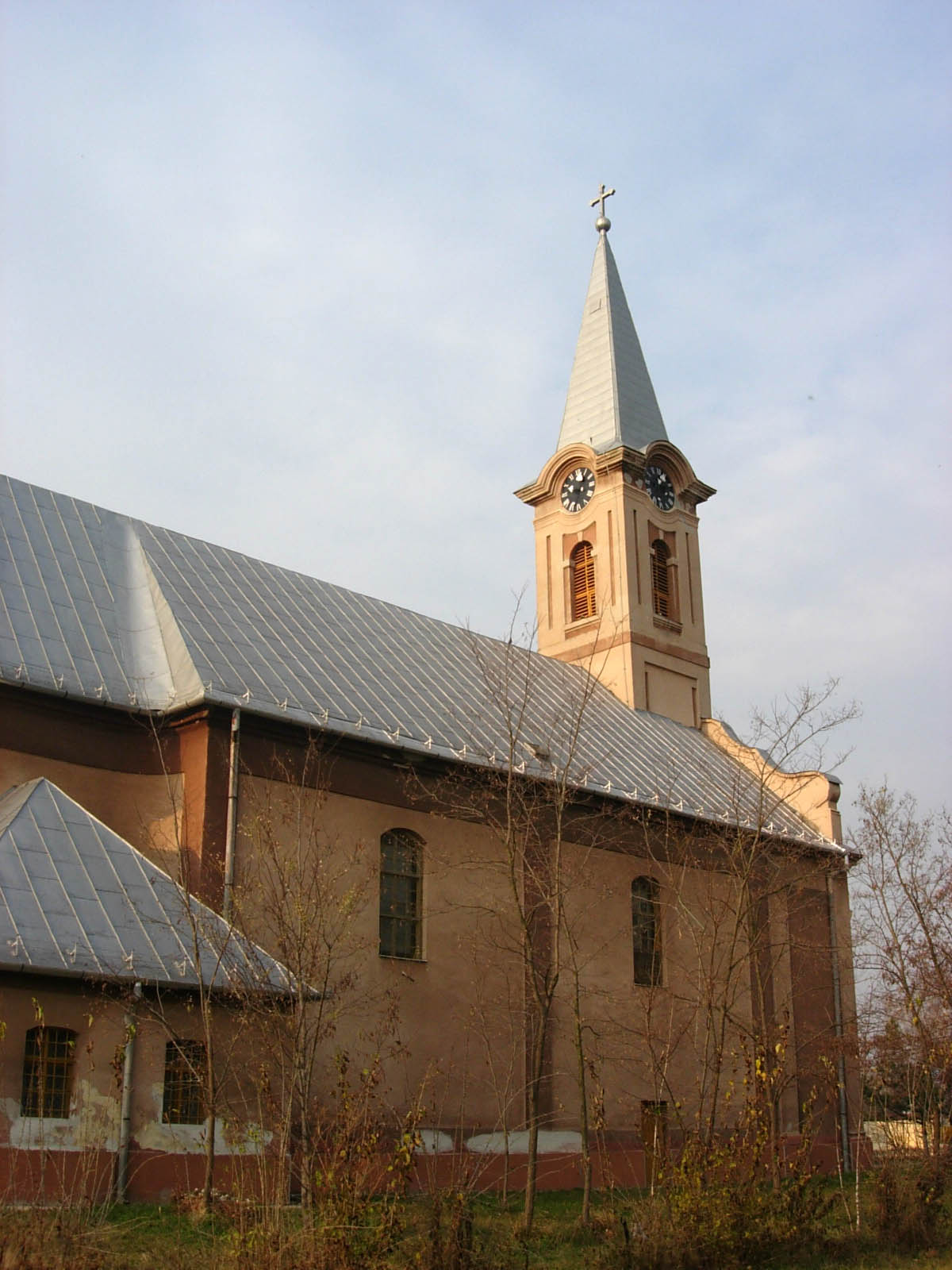
Saint Stephen the King Catholic Church

== See also ==
- List of places in Serbia
- List of cities, towns and villages in Vojvodina
