= Lovćenac =

Lovćenac Ловћенац (Serbian) Hungarian: Szeghegy German: Sekitsch
- Village (Selo)
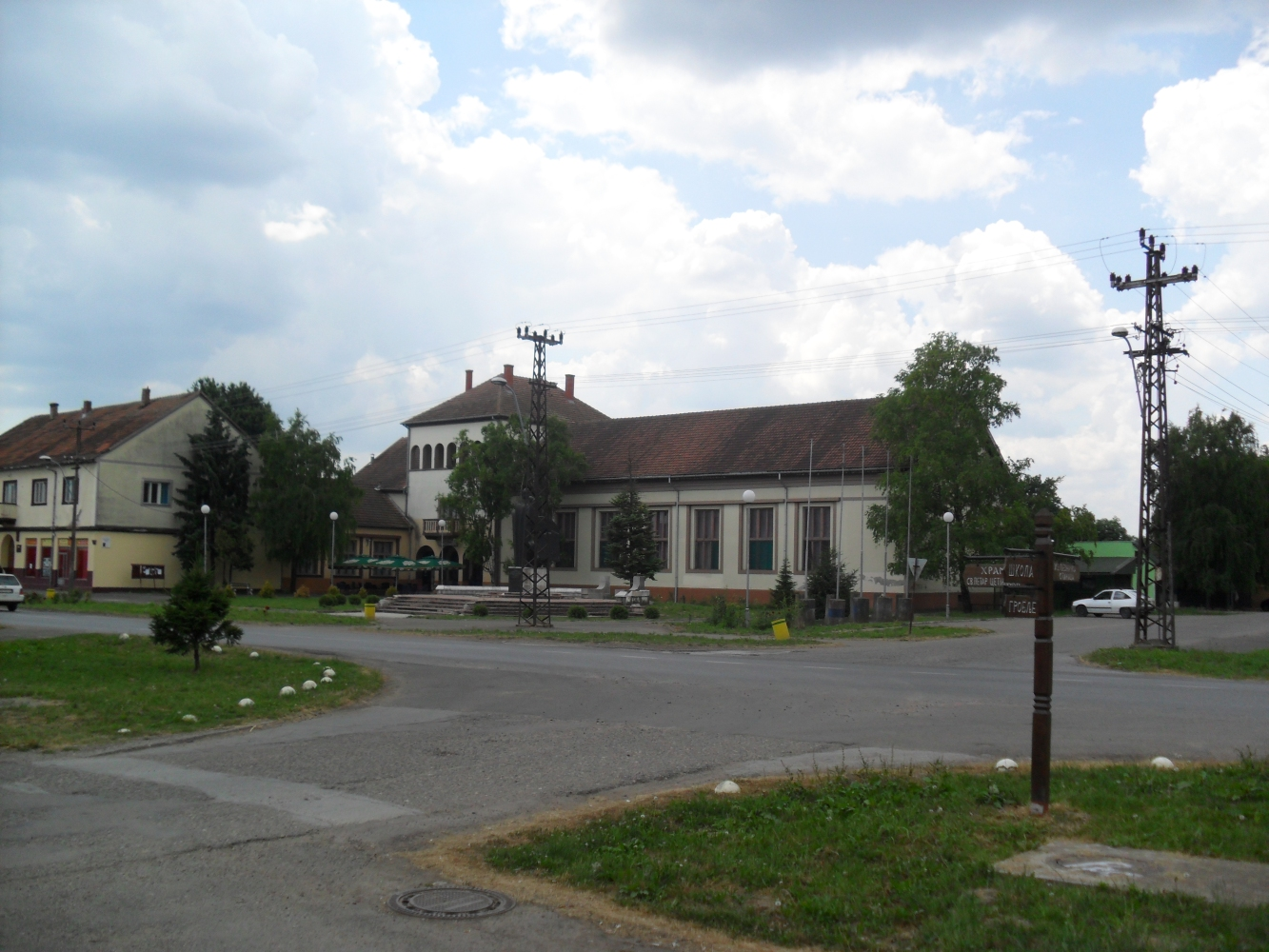
- Intersection in Lovćenac

- Location within Vojvodina Location within Serbia Location within Europe
- Coordinates: 45°41′N 19°41′E
- Country: Serbia
- Province: Vojvodina
- District: North Bačka District
- Municipality: Mali Iđoš
- Founded: 1786

Government
  - Type: Council
  - President: Radovan Milić

Area
  - Total: 38.3 km^{2} (14.8 sq mi)
- Elevation: 89 m (292 ft)

Population (2022)
  - Total: 2,585
  - Density: 67.5/km^{2} (175/sq mi)
- Time zone: UTC+1 (CET)
  - Summer (DST): UTC+2 (CEST)

Lovćenac (Serbian Cyrillic: Ловћенац) is a village located in the Mali Iđoš municipality, North Bačka District, Vojvodina, Serbia. The village has a population of 2,585 people (2022 census).

== Name ==
In Serbian, the village is known as Lovćenac (Ловћенац), in German as Sekitsch (in the past rarely Winkelsberg), and in Hungarian as Szeghegy.

Its former name in Serbian was Sekić (Секић). After the World War II, the village was named Lovćenac by the Montenegrin settlers after Mount Lovćen in Montenegro.

The original Hungarian name of the village was Szeghegy, but Hungarians also used Serbian version of the name in the forms Szikics and Szekics, as well as Germans in the form Sekitsch. One very rare alternative German name was Winkelsberg.

== History ==
After years of Ottoman-Habsburg conflicts a policy of repopulation of the devastated Pannonian Basin was pursued during the reign of Maria Theresa and Joseph II. Ethnic German (predominantly Protestant) colonists known as Danube Swabians (German: Donauschwaben) settled the Bačka region, establishing the village Sekitsch in 1786. The economy and life of the village generally consisted of farming, trading, livestock breeding, viticulture and brewing. In 1849 the Battle of Hegyes (occasionally known as Szeghegy) was fought on the outskirts of the village as part of the Hungarian revolution, and war of independence.

Following World War I and the collapse of the Austro-Hungarian Empire, Sekitsch became part of the Kingdom of Serbs, Croats and Slovenes (later renamed Yugoslavia). This political shift caused ethnic Germans to become one of the largest minorities in Serbia, numbering approximately 330,000 people, or almost 5% of the total Yugoslav population. In 1936 the Summer Olympics torch relay passes through Sekitsch. During the April War of 1941 Hungarian troops entered Sekitsch, subsequently annexing the Bačka to the Kingdom of Hungary. As declared Volksdeutsche the villagers were tolerated by the new authority, though mandatory conscription in the Waffen SS was conducted. Sekitsch also harboured urban children as part of the Kinderlandverschickung program.

Following the war Germans left the country, together with the defeated German army. Those who remained were interned into prison camps. After camps were disbanded in 1948, most of the remaining Yugoslav Germans emigrated to Germany because of economic reasons in the next decades. After World War II, the village was colonized by settlers from Montenegro and Mt. Vlašić, Bosnia. The Montenegrins renamed the village in honor of Mt. Lovćen and account for the majority of the population.

== Demographics ==
Ethnic composition (2022 census)
1. Serbs (48.3%)
2. Montenegrins (37.3%)
3. Hungarians (3.60%)
4. Rusyns (0.60%)
5. Roma (0.40%)
6. Macedonians (0.40%)
7. Yugoslavs (0.30%)
8. Croats (0.30%)
9. Muslims (0.10%)
10. Other (1.90%)
11. Undeclared/Unknown (6.60%)

=== Historical population ===
- 1822: 1,751
- 1850: 2,825
- 1970: 3,377
- 1885: 4,485
- 1900: 4,936
- 1910: 5,394
- 1945: 4,447
- 1948: 4,791
- 1961: 4,800
- 1971: 4,159
- 1981: 4,016
- 1991: 4,049
- 2002: 3,693
- 2011: 3,161
- 2022: 2,585

=== Ethnic groups ===
The village of Lovćenac is predominantly inhabited by descendants of Montenegrins colonists who settled the village in the years following WWII (especially between 1945-48). Those claiming ancestry from Montenegro form majority, with most declaring as Serb whilst others espouse an ethnic Montenegrin identity. Another smaller group of Bosnian Serbs known as Vlašićani, deriving from villages on Mount Vlašić and the Travnik area of Central Bosnia settled in Lovćenac during the 1950s and 1960s.

== Culture ==
Village cultural life features several societies which strive to maintain and celebrate the diverse identity and traditions of Lovćenac. Being the epicentre of the Montenegrin community in Serbia, the village is home to the Association of Montenegrins of Serbia "Krstaš", alongside the Cultural Arts Society "Petar Petrović-Njegoš" and the Montenegrin Cultural and Educational Society "Princeza Ksenija". Since 2013 the Bosnian Serb descendants of Mount Vlašić have assembled within the Native Association "Vlašić". In sports Lovćenac is represented by Football Club Njegoš, which also features basketball and karate sub-branches. A modest collection of artefacts and historical content of the once thriving Danube Swabian community is located in the Sekitsch Museum. Community engagement in various associations and clubs had developed in the 20th century, with football becoming the most popular pastime following WWI when Sekitsch Sport Club was founded. The most important annual event for the ethnic German's was the annually celebration of the Evangelical Church Kirchweih. The majority of Lovćenac villagers today are of the Eastern Orthodox faith, with the Saint Peter of Cetinje Serbian Orthodox Church (SPC) servicing the spiritual needs of the community. In 2008 the canonically unrecognized Montenegrin Orthodox Church (CPC) laid foundations to build a church but construction was postponed due to protests from the SPC. Nevertheless the CPC remains an active party within the Montenegrin ethnic community of Lovćenac.

== Notable people ==
- Mitar Pešikan, linguist and member of the Serbian Academy of Sciences and Arts
- Sofija Pekić, former female Serbian basketball player, Olympic bronze medalist
- Danilo Popivoda, Slovenian football player of Serbian descent
- Nenad Stevović, politician
- Radovan Stevović, author, Yugoslav Partisan and Montenegrin colonist leader
- Peter Max Wagner, Danube Swabian humanitarian and refugee advocate

=== Twin towns – Sister cities ===
Lovćenac is twinned with:

- Cetinje, Montenegro
- Bar, Montenegro

== See also ==
- Montenegrins of Serbia
- List of places in Serbia
- List of cities, towns and villages in Vojvodina

== Gallery ==
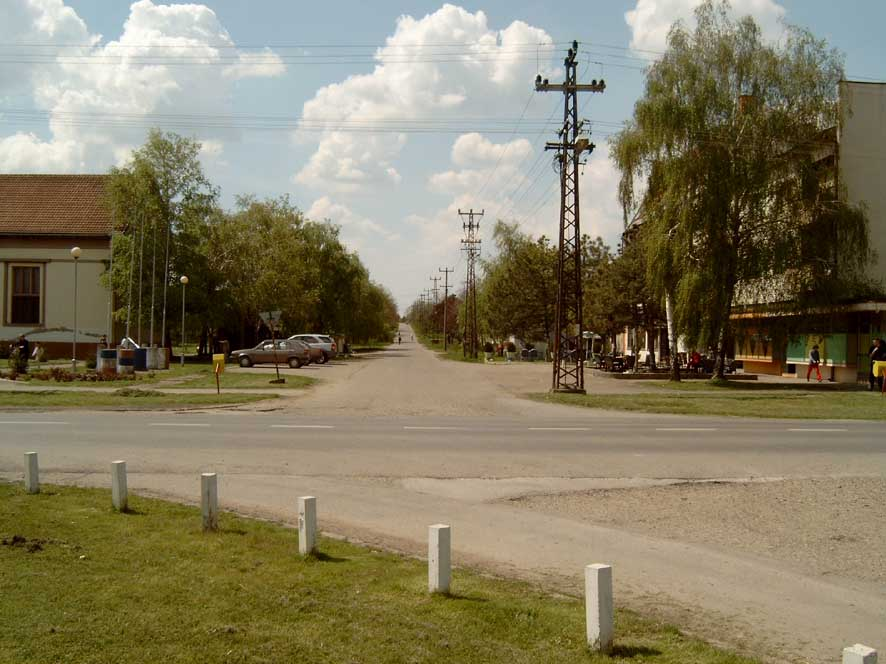
An intersection on the main road in Lovćenac today.

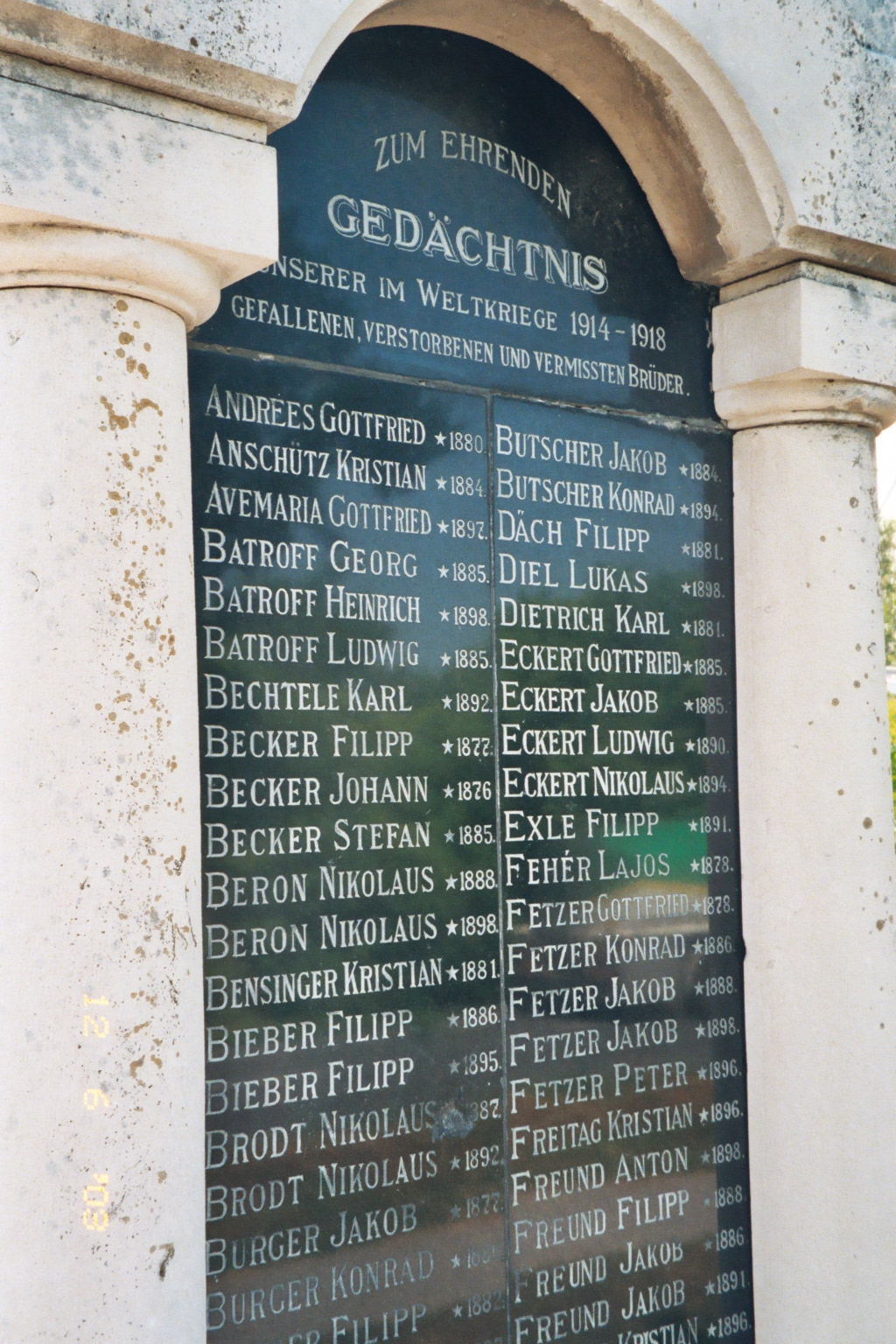
Memorial for soldiers from Lovćenac who died in World War I.

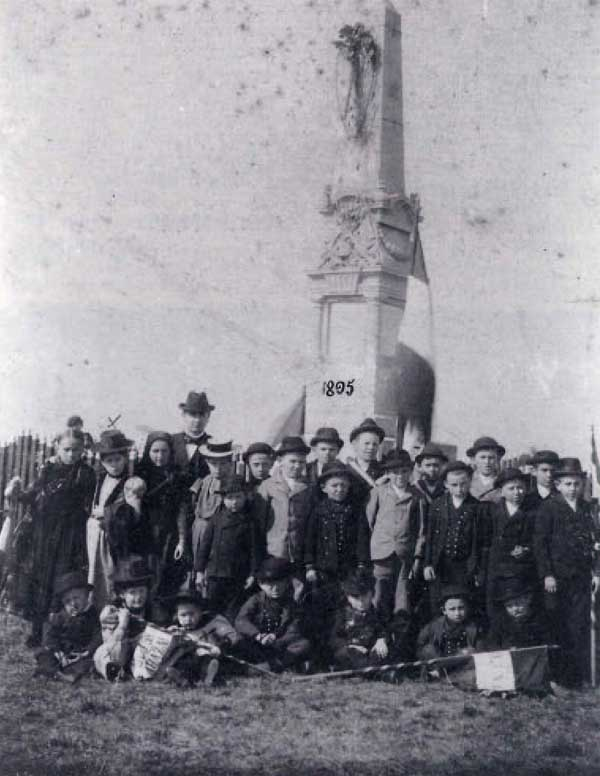
This memorial, referred to as "de Steen", was erected in 1895 to commemorate those who died in a 1849 battle near Lovćenac.

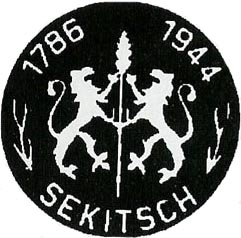
This emblem, commonly featured on books about the German diaspora from Lovćenac, gives the dates of their habitation.

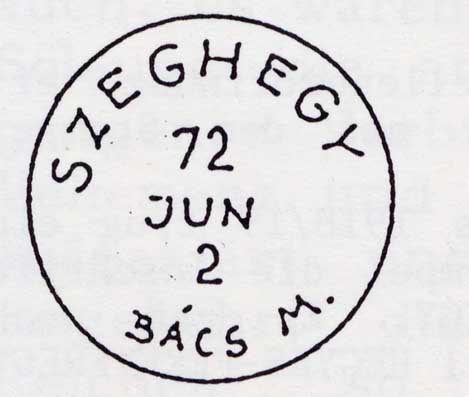
Sekić got its first post office in 1872.
