= Nenad Stevović =

Serbian economist

Nenad Stevović (Montenegrin Cyrillic: Ненад Стевовић; born 1962) is a Serbian politician, publicist, political scientist and a researcher. He is a prominent figure in the Montenegrin community in Serbia and is the founder and the president of the Montenegrin Party.

== Biography ==
He was born in Lovćenac in 1962 to an ethnic Montenegrin family. He was the founder and first president of the Association of Montenegrins of Serbia "Crusader" (2003). He was also the founder and is the president of the Montenegrin Party (2008). He is the initiator and coordinator of the founding of the Montenegrin cultural and educational association "Princess Ksenija" from Lovćenac, the Montenegrin community of Prokuplje, the Montenegrin cultural and educational association "Montenegrina" from Subotica and the Montenegrin cultural center of Belgrade. He was the initiator of the twinning of Cetinje and the Vojvodina municipality of Mali Iđoš, where the settlement of Lovćenac is located (2005).

Stevović was active before and during the referendum campaign for the independence of Montenegro. His activity was especially manifested in the organization of Montenegrin diaspora in Serbia and several European countries. Stevović was the initiator and implementer of the installation of the bust of the Montenegrin bishop and writer Petar II Petrović-Njegoš in Lovćenac (2012). Initiator of the introduction of Montenegrin language into official use in Serbia in the municipalities of Mali Iđoš, Vrbas and Kula. He was the founder, and the editor-in-chief of the magazine "Oganj", a list of the Montenegrin diaspora (2004-2007). Stevović was the founder of the book fund in the Montenegrin language and script in the state libraries in Mali Iđoš, Lovćenac and Feketić. He is a member of Matica crnogorska, Vojvodina Political Science Association and the Independent Association of Journalists of Vojvodina.
