= Demographic history of Belgrade =

Historical view on Belgrade's population statistics

This article is about demographic history of Belgrade, the capital and largest city of Serbia.

== Antiquity ==
Belgrade, known as Celtic Singidunum, was founded in the 3rd century B.C., near the site of a prehistoric settlement of Vinča (Vinča culture), which ranks the city among the oldest ones in Europe and the world. There are some evidence that might show that the city was also a Greek colony in the ancient times although this has not been scientifically verified. The first verifiable mention of the settlement under its ancient name, Singidunum, was in 279 B.C., which some consider to be a founding year of the city.

| Year | Population |
|---|---|
| 170 | 8,000 |
| 1426 | 50,000 |
| 1834 | 7,033 |
| 1846 | 14,371 |
| 1859 | 18,860 |
| 1866 | 24,768 |
| 1874 | 27,605 |
| 1884 | 35,483 |
| 1890 | 54,763 |
| 1900 | 68,481 |
| 1910 | 82,498 |
| 1921 | 111,739 |
| 1931 | 238,775 |
| 1948 | 397,678 |
| 1953 | 477,942 |
| 1961 | 657,302 |
| 1971 | 899,004 |
| 1981 | 1,087,804 |
| 1991 | 1,168,409 |
| 2002 | 1,191,213^{a} |
| 2011 | 1,257,958^{a} |
| 2022 | 1,298,661^{a} |
^{a} contiguous urban area, including adjacent settlements of Borča, Kaluđerica, and Surčin

During the Celtic period it was a small town of several hundred, up to a thousand people, so it was more of a fishing village than a real town, even though it was fortified. On the eve of a new era the city was taken over by the Romans and refortified; in the Roman period the importance of the city as a border- and river port spot will grow, and so would its population. In 86 AD Singidunum became a Roman colony under Legio IV Flavia Felix, and a golden era of the city begun; by the mid-2nd century, when the city has evolved into a municipium, the city has numbered some 10,000 inhabitants, roughly 6,000 of them serving for the Roman Imperial Army, and the rest being civilians. Its fort grew stronger and bigger due to continuous clashes with the Dacians. The city at that time has had its theatres, sewage system, temples and was touched by Christian movement at a very early stage. At one time it abolished its status to Rome and became an independent colony.

3rd century brought turmoil to the Empire, as it was a subject to invasions from the East, by the Goths; the city also crumbled both in population and importance, being a strategic town and suffering numerous invasions. It continued throughout 4th and 5th centuries as well, when the city was included into the Eastern Roman Empire as a guardian of its northern border; it was repeatedly sacked by Huns (under Attila himself), Ostrogoths, Avars, Gepides, Sarmatians, and Serbs. Justinian I retook the city and held it for some 50 years, but the ancient glory was never restored. The name of the city has also been erased from the records by its new conquerors - Serbs, who renamed it "Beograd" (the White city), marking the beginning of a new chapter of its history.

== Middle Ages ==
During the entire course of early-medieval times, Belgrade did not have an opportunity to evolve, as it was a subject of rivalry between the Bulgarian Empire, Byzantine Empire, and Hungarians. Serbs at that time had no interest in the north, as most of their states were in the south: inner Serbia, Zachlumia, Travunija, Zeta etc.; It wasn't until King Stefan Dragutin in 13th century that Belgrade was included into the Kingdom of Serbia and shaped its Orthodox rather than Hungarian Catholic character. Its population gradually started to increase at that time, numbering over 10,000 by the end of the century, and 20,000 by the end of the 14th century. When Serbian Empire collapsed in 1389, more and more refugees from the south sought refuge in Belgrade. In 1403 it became the capital of Serbian Despotate, evolving into a Christian Mecca in Ottoman-occupied Balkans. Under Despot Stefan Lazarević, who was a quintessential knight, poet and artist, Belgrade was a seat of a free Christian state that regulated trade between East and West. Its ancient walls and castles were reconstructed and refortified, its churches raised, its culture experienced a boom due to proximity of Oriental and Western influences, and its population soared reaching 50,000.

In 1430 it became part of the Kingdom of Hungary, and in 1456 it was victorious against Ottomans, when Christian Europe united in the city to put an end to the siege of Belgrade. The golden age of the city continued into the 16th century. However, in 1521 the Ottomans conquered Belgrade. The population slowly started to decrease, as more and more colonists from Anatolia poured into Belgrade, and its culture became a danger to the Porte. In 1594, after a rebellion in Banat, many Serbs moved to the north and west, especially after the burning of Saint Sava's remnants in Belgrade by the Ottomans. Wars in today's northern Serbia, Hungary, Bosnia, and Croatia encouraged many to start moving into those areas which were depopulated, as the Ottoman influence was less intense in those areas. In the following century the Habsburg Empire took over most of these areas (except Bosnia), and the Serbian migration wave reached its peak in 1690 and 1737, when thousands of Serbs from Kosovo and Southern Serbia left their lands to Muslims, moving north of the Danube into Christian Austria. The results of these migrations are still evident to this day, as Serbs became a majority in Vojvodina, much of western Bosnia, but also became a minority in Kosovo and Sandžak. Novi Sad would resume the title of the Serbian capital of culture and liberty in following centuries, thriving in Habsburg Empire while Belgrade entirely deteriorated under Ottoman Empire. Zemun (today's northern suburb of Belgrade) became home to hundreds of refugees from Belgrade.

== Modern period ==
The city was the seat of a revolutionary government, when First Serbian Uprising escalated against Ottomans, after almost three centuries of occupation. It became the seat of education when the Belgrade Higher School was founded, the oldest educational facility in the Balkans that continued to exist still today as the University of Belgrade. At that time, between 1804 and 1813, on its 400th anniversary as a Serbian capital, Belgrade was a seat of the Principality of Serbia. Its population started to grow as the trade with Zemun and Austria were established; Karađorđe was supported by the Russians and French emperor Napoleon I, who came dangerously close to the country. Ottomans reconquered this rebelled province with much bloodshed, but a year later Second Serbian Uprising surprised them and Serbia was finally semi-independent from Ottoman Empire.

In 1817 the autonomy was proclaimed and house of Obrenović started its 90-year reign in Serbia. Belgrade, at the time tiny town of some 7,000 inhabitants, was restored as the national capital in 1839, with its growing importance, being the Orthodox Christian buffer-zone between Catholic Austria Habsburg Empire and Muslim Ottoman Empire. As the feudalism was abolished the city grew rapidly in economy and in population; by 1866 it had some 24,000 residents, and by Serbia's independence in 1878 it reached about 35,000 inhabitants. The city was entirely westernized and rebuilt with nearby Vienna and Budapest being its architectural role models (during the three Habsburg occupations in the past the Baroque buildings were demolished by Ottomans). It also became a cultural and educational hub for people from neighbouring regions that were under foreign domination: Bosnia, Bulgarian, Vardar Macedonia, etc. However, the economy of Kingdom of Serbia was weak and the Serbs were still living in three different states: Serbia, Ottoman Empire, and Austria-Hungary. Serbia lived out of livestock and agriculture, although Belgrade as a city was increasingly modern, getting a train rail in 1882, its trams, electricity, and even cinema, at the end of the 19th century, becoming thus the most developed city in the Balkans. By 1910 the city reached 82,000 inhabitants, ranking fifth in the Balkans only behind Istanbul, Athens, Thessaloniki, and Sofia.

World War I left Serbia devastated, having lost 33% of its entire population. Belgrade, being unprotected and opened to Austria-Hungary with its two rivers, has also been largely demolished. During the war, the population fell down to only about 20,000, but soon after the war ended and Kingdom of Serbs, Croats, and Slovenes was formed, the city gained a large influx of population, largely Serbs from devastated areas but also Serbs from present-day Croatia and Bosnia and Herzegovina. It was the first time in history that two neighbouring towns, Belgrade and Zemun, have had a chance to unite. This occurred in 1929 and the combined population stood at 240,000 inhabitants.

World War II saw a big destruction in Belgrade; thousands have died in Luftwaffe air raids, and tens of thousands in concentration camps on Sajmište, Banjica, and Jajinci. However, Belgrade recovered quite quickly after the war, and as a capital of Yugoslavia, becoming an political and cultural hub of the nation. The population growth was huge; between 1948 and 1971 the city population more than doubled, from nearly 400,000 in 1948 to around 900,000 in 1971, and the city finally passed 1 million mark in 1981. The 1990s saw wars and economic collapse caused by the international sanctions against Serbia and Montenegro; some 300,000 left the country, many from Belgrade, while on the other hand, more than a half a million Serb refugees from Croatia, Kosovo, and Bosnia-Herzegovina have settled in Serbia, and Belgrade in particular. Results from the 2022 census showed that the population of the Belgrade proper is at 1.2 million while population of the Belgrade contiguous urban area (which, besides Belgrade proper, include three adjacent urban settlements: Borča, Surčin, and Kaluđerica) stands at 1.3 million.

== See also ==
- Demographics of Belgrade
- Demographic history of Serbia
