= Montenegrin Party =

Political party in Serbia

Montenegrin Party Црногорска партија Crnogorska partija
- Leader: Milo Milojko
- Founder: Nenad Stevović
- Founded: 18 February 2008
- Headquarters: Novi Sad
- Ideology: Montenegrin ethnic minority interests; Montenegrin nationalism
- Colours: Red; Yellow
- National Assembly: 0 / 250
- Assembly of Vojvodina: 0 / 120

Website
- crnogorska-partija.rs

The Montenegrin Party (Montenegrin: Црногорска партија, romanized: Crnogorska partija, CP) is a political party in Serbia, representing the Montenegrin ethnic minority. The party was founded by Nenad Stevović, who was its leader from 2008 to 2014, when he resigned.

== History ==
The Montenegrin Party was founded on 18 February 2008 and was registered as a political party in the Serbian Ministry of Justice on 22 February 2008, becoming the first political party that represents the Montenegrin minority in Serbia. Montenegrin Party ran as a minority list in the 2008 parliamentary election. However, the party won only 0.07% of votes, failing to obtain a seat in the National Assembly. The party also ran independently in the 2012 and 2014, winning 0.1% and 0.18% votes respectively. In the 2014 election the Montenegrin Party electoral list was headed by Joška Broz, president of the Communist Party and grandson of former Yugoslav leader Josip Broz Tito. The party did not run in the 2016 parliamentary election, and supported the candidacy of Saša Janković in the 2017 presidential election.

== Elections ==
=== Parliamentary elections ===
Year	Popular vote	% of popular vote	Overall seats won	Coalition	Government
2008	2,923	0.07%	0 / 250	—	non-parliamentary
2012	3,855	0.1%	0 / 250	—	non-parliamentary
2014	6,388	0.18%	0 / 250	with KP	non-parliamentary
2016	Did not participate		0 / 250	—	non-parliamentary
2020	30,591	0.95%	0 / 250	UDS	non-parliamentary
2022	Did not participate		0 / 250		non-parliamentary
