= Montenegrins of Serbia =

Црногорци у Србији Crnogorci u Srbiji
- Ethnic flag of Montenegrins of Serbia

Total population
- 20,238 (2022)

Regions with significant populations
- Vojvodina: 12,424
- Belgrade: 5,134

Languages
- Serbian and Montenegrin (standard varieties of Serbo-Croatian)

Religion
- Eastern Orthodoxy (Serbian Orthodox Church)

Related ethnic groups
- Serbs, South Slavs

Montenegrins are a recognized ethnic minority in Serbia. According to data from the 2022 census, the population of ethnic Montenegrins in Serbia is 20,238, constituting 0.3% of the total population.

== History ==
Throughout the 19th and 20th centuries there were multiple waves of migration from Montenegro to Serbia. Following the First Serbian Uprising, there was some migration of Montenegrins into Šumadija. Famine in 1847-48 resulted in hundreds of families migrating to Serbia in caravans, and further waves occurred in the 1870s due to warfare. The first major organized colonization program began in 1919, when land was distributed to Montenegrin families to settle in Kosovo and Vojvodina. The largest colonization program occurred in the immediate aftermath of World War II, following the implementation of a new law in August 1945. By August 1946, 4,899 Montenegrin families were settled in Vojvodina as part of this program, which continued through 1948.

== Demographics ==
The largest concentration of ethnic Montenegrins in Serbia are to be found in Vojvodina and Belgrade. There are 12,424 Montenegrins in Vojvodina or 0.7% of the provincial population. Montenegrin population is particularly present in municipalities of central Bačka: Mali Iđoš (12.3% of population), Vrbas (11.6%), and Kula (5.6%). Settlements with significant share of ethnic Montenegrins include: Lovćenac in Mali Iđoš municipality (37.3%), Kruščić (16%) in Kula municipality, as well as Savino Selo (17.9%) and Bačko Dobro Polje (12%) in Vrbas municipality.

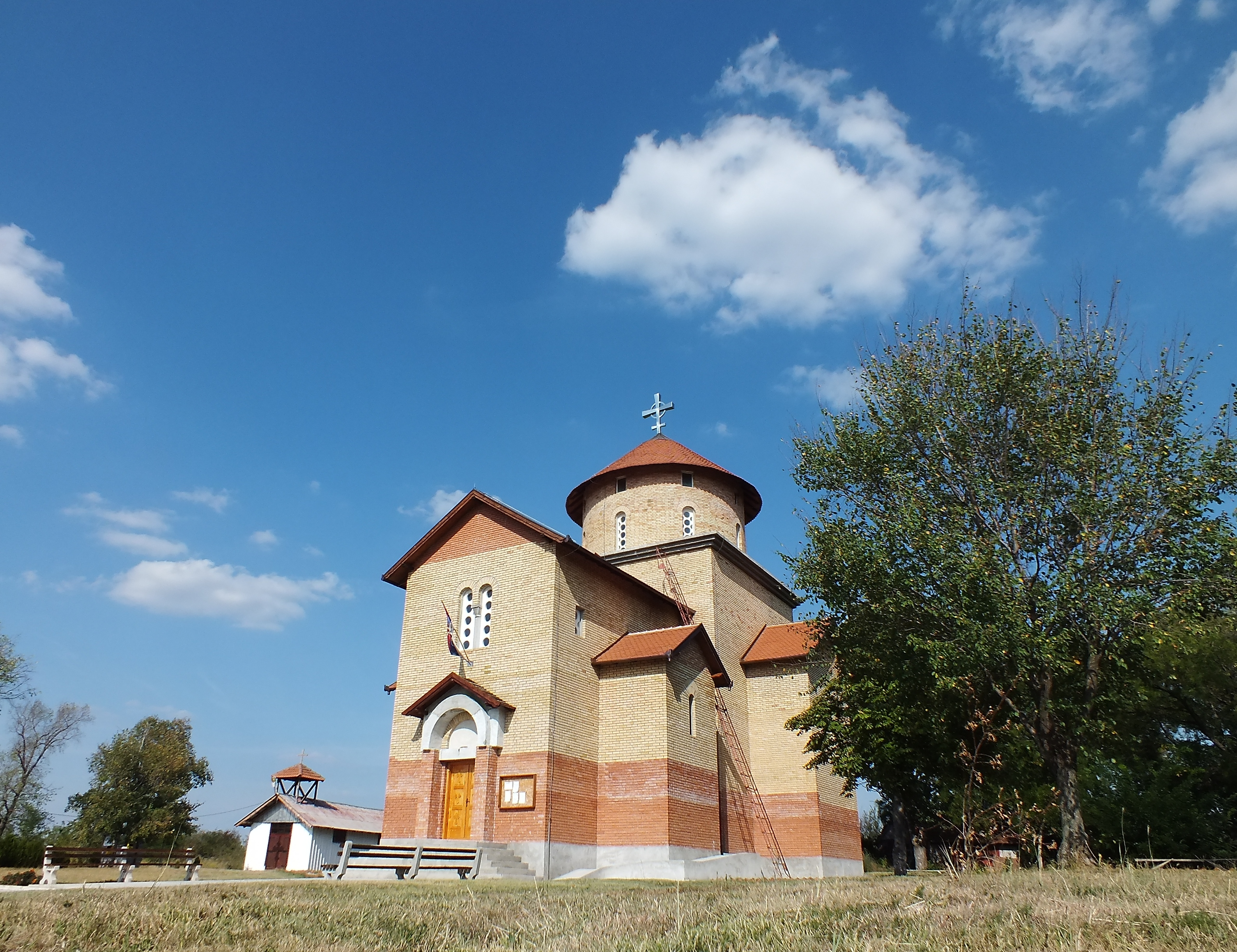
Church of Saint Peter of Cetinje in Lovćenac

| Year | Population |
|---|---|
| 1948 | 74,860 |
| 1953 | 86,061 |
| 1961 | 104,753 |
| 1971 | 125,260 |
| 1981 | 147,466 |
| 1991 | 118,934 |
| 2002 (excl. Kosovo) | 69,049 |
| 2011 (excl. Kosovo) | 38,527 |
| 2022 (excl. Kosovo) | 20,238 |

== Politics ==
The National Council of Montenegrin Ethnic Minority in Serbia is a representation body of Montenegrins, established for the protection of the rights and the minority self-government of Montenegrins in Serbia.

The Montenegrin Party is the ethnic minority party representing interests of Montenegrins in Serbia.

== Culture ==
Montenegrins in Serbia mostly speak Serbian, while some 10% declared Montenegrin as their mother tongue. The Montenegrin language is one of languages in official use in the municipality of Mali Iđoš.

The Association of Montenegrins of Serbia "Krstaš" is a cultural organization based in Lovćenac, dedicated to preserving and promoting Montenegrin cultural identity, language, traditions, and history among Montenegrins in Serbia, particularly in central Bačka.

== Notable people ==
- Duško Vujošević – basketball coach
- Adam Marušić – football player
- Nenad Stevović – politician and publicist

== See also ==
- Serbia–Montenegro relations
- Serbia and Montenegro
- Serbian–Montenegrin unionism
- Serbs of Montenegro
