= Bulgarians in Serbia =

Бугари у Србији Българи в Сърбия
- Ethnic flag of Bulgarians in Serbia

Total population
- 12,918 (2022)

Regions with significant populations
- Bosilegrad: 4,075
- Dimitrovgrad: 3,669

Languages
- Bulgarian and Serbian

Religion
- Eastern Orthodoxy

Bulgarians are recognized ethnic minority in Serbia. According to data from the 2022 census, there are 12,918 ethnic Bulgarians, constituting 0.2% of the total population of Serbia. The vast majority of them live in the southeastern corner of the country, bordering Bulgaria and North Macedonia.

== History ==
The regional names once used by many people in the Torlakian-speaking region was Torlaci and Šopi speaking a transitional speech between Bulgarian and Serbian. Before the Ottoman conquest, the borders of the region frequently shifted between Byzantine, Bulgarian, and Serbian rulers. According to some authors during the Ottoman rule, the majority of native Torlakian Slavic population did not have a distinct national consciousness in the ethnic sense. The first known literary monument, influenced by Torlakian dialects is the Manuscript from Temska Monastery from 1762, in which its author, the monk Kiril Živković from Pirot, considered his language as simple Bulgarian.

A Silesian traveler stated in 1596 that the road of his trip from Sofia to Niš was filled with corpses and described the gates of Niš as standing in front of freshly beheaded heads of poor Bulgarian peasants by the Ottoman army. The Pirot Rebellion broke out in 1836, followed by the Niš rebellion in 1836, which also included Pirot. According to Ottoman statistics during the Tanzimat the greater part of the population up to the Sanjak of Niš was treated as Bulgarian. According to all authors between 1840 and 1872 the delineation between Bulgarians and Serbs is undisputed and ran north of Niš. The Serbian researchers (such as Dimitrije Davidović in 1828 and Milan Savić in 1878) also accepted South Morava river as such delineation and added Niš outside the borders of the Serbian people. It was also stipulated the area to be ceded to Bulgaria according to the Constantinople Conference in 1876 and most of it according to the Treaty of San Stefano in 1878. From 1870 until then the area was part of the Bulgarian Orthodox Church, before that the area had been under the Ecumenical Patriarchate of Constantinople and the Serbian Patriarchate of Peć.

Following World War I, four territories, now known to the Bulgarian community as the Western Outlands, passed to the Kingdom of Serbs, Croats, and Slovenes from Bulgaria as a war indemnity, and the remains of the old border can be seen at Vlasina lake. In the Interwar Period, the Internal Western Outland Revolutionary Organisation, countering Yugoslav rule in the region, was engaged in repeated attacks against the Yugoslav police and army. During World War II Bulgaria retook the Western Outlands, as well as Pirot and Vranje. After the World War II, these regions were returned to Yugoslavia and therefore Serbia, which was constituent republic of Yugoslav federation.

== Demographics ==
According to data from the 2022 census, there are 12,918 Bulgarians in Serbia. They are primarily located in two municipalities near Serbia's border with Bulgaria: in Bosilegrad there are 4,075 Bulgarians i.e. 67.2% of population, while in Dimitrovgrad there are 3,669 Bulgarians or 45.6% of population.

The dominant religion among ethnic Bulgarians in Serbia is Eastern Orthodox. Islam never arrived in areas like Bosilegrad because of the mountainous terrain and most inhabitants dwelled in high mountain villages where they were hard to reach. They use both Serbian and Bulgarian churches due to the low number of Bulgarian clergymen present in the region. There is a church in every village around Bosilegrad, and the oldest ones date to the 11th century.

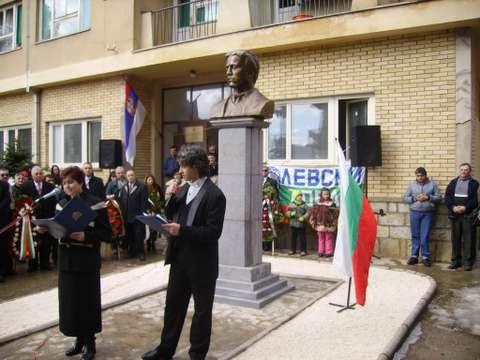
Unveiling of the bust of Bulgarian revolutionary Vasil Levski in Bosilegrad

Year	Ethnic Bulgarians	Bulgarian Speakers
1948	59,472	
1953	60,146	59,166
1961	58,494	
1971	53,800	49,942
1981	33,455	35,269
1991	26,698	25,408
2002 (excl. Kosovo)	20,497	16,459
2011 (excl. Kosovo)	18,543	13,337
2022 (excl. Kosovo)	12,918	7,939

== Notable people ==
- Helena of Bulgaria – regent of Serbia
- Gregory Tsamblak – medieval writer and cleric
- Gru – musician

== See also ==
- Bulgarian diaspora
- Shopi
- Western Outlands
- Bulgaria–Serbia relations
