= Yugoslavs in Serbia =

Југословени у Србији Jugosloveni u Srbiji

Total population
- 27,143 (2022)

Regions with significant populations
- Vojvodina: 12,438
- Belgrade: 10,499

Languages
- Serbo-Croatian

Religion
- Predominately irreligious; Eastern Orthodoxy, Catholicism, Islam

Yugoslavs in Serbia refers to a community in Serbia that view themselves as Yugoslavs with no other ethnic self-identification. According to data from the 2022 census, 27,143 people or 0.4% of population of Serbia declared their ethnicity as exclusively Yugoslav.

== Identity ==
Besides self-declared Yugoslavs, there are also Serbs, Croats, Montenegrins, Bosniaks, and people of other ethnicities in Serbia who identify themselves as Yugoslavs in a broader sense. However, they don't consider themselves to be part of a Yugoslav ethnicity, which is the way the self-declared Yugoslavs identify themselves.

Ahead of the 2022 census, a newly formed organization called National Movement "Yugoslavs" (Narodni pokret “Jugosloveni”) began campaigning to citizens of Serbia to freely self-identify as Yugoslavs, an initiative joined by a number of public figures. One of them is a radio host Daško Milinović, who also announced that work is underway for establishing the National Council of Yugoslavs in Serbia for self-identifying Yugoslavs to enjoy equal ethnic minority rights. According to Milinović, Yugoslavs are a community not in an ethnic sense but a community of common values. Among the younger generations who never lived in former Yugoslavia, identifying as Yugoslav tends to be due to their multi-ethnic background but also in protest against nationalism.

== Demographics ==
People declaring themselves as Yugoslavs are largely concentrated in Vojvodina and Belgrade, where around 85% of all Yugoslavs in Serbia are found.

Year	Population	Share
1971	123,824	1.4%
1981	441,941	4.7%
1991	323,643	3.3%
1991	320,186	4.1%
2002 (excl. Kosovo)	80,721	1.1%
2011 (excl. Kosovo)	23,303	0.3%
2022 (excl. Kosovo)	27,143	0.4%

Region	Population	Share
Vojvodina	12,438	0.7%
Belgrade	10,499	0.6%
Šumadija and Western Serbia	2,327	0.1%
Southern and Eastern Serbia	1,879	0.1%

== Notable people ==
- Lepa Brena – singer, Bosniak parentage
- Oliver Dulić – politician, mixed Serb and Bunjevac parentage
- Predrag Ejdus – actor, mixed Jewish and Serb parentage
