= Germans in Serbia =

Немци у Србији Serbiendeutsche

Total population
- 2,573 (2022)

Regions with significant populations
- Vojvodina

Languages
- Serbian and German

Religion
- Catholicism, Protestantism

Related ethnic groups
- Danube Swabians, Banat Swabians, Germans of Romania, Germans of Hungary, Germans of Croatia

Germans are recognized ethnic minority in Serbia. According to data from the 2022 census, there were 2,573 Germans living in Serbia. The Germans of Serbia usually refer to themselves as Swabian (Schwaben, Švabe), and they are grouped into the Danube Swabians or Banat Swabians in the Vojvodina region, where the majority of the German population in Serbia resides.

== Demographics ==
Most of the Germans are living in Vojvodina region, and to a lesser degree in Belgrade.

Population of ethnic Germans on territory of the present-day Serbia:

Year	Population
1880	285,920
1890	321,563
1900	336,430
1910	324,017
1921	335,902
1931	328,631
1948	44,460
1953	46,228
1961	14,533
1971	9,086
1981	5,302
1991	5,263
2002 (excl. Kosovo)	3,901
2011 (excl. Kosovo)	4,064
2022 (excl. Kosovo)	2,573

== History ==
=== Habsburg rule ===
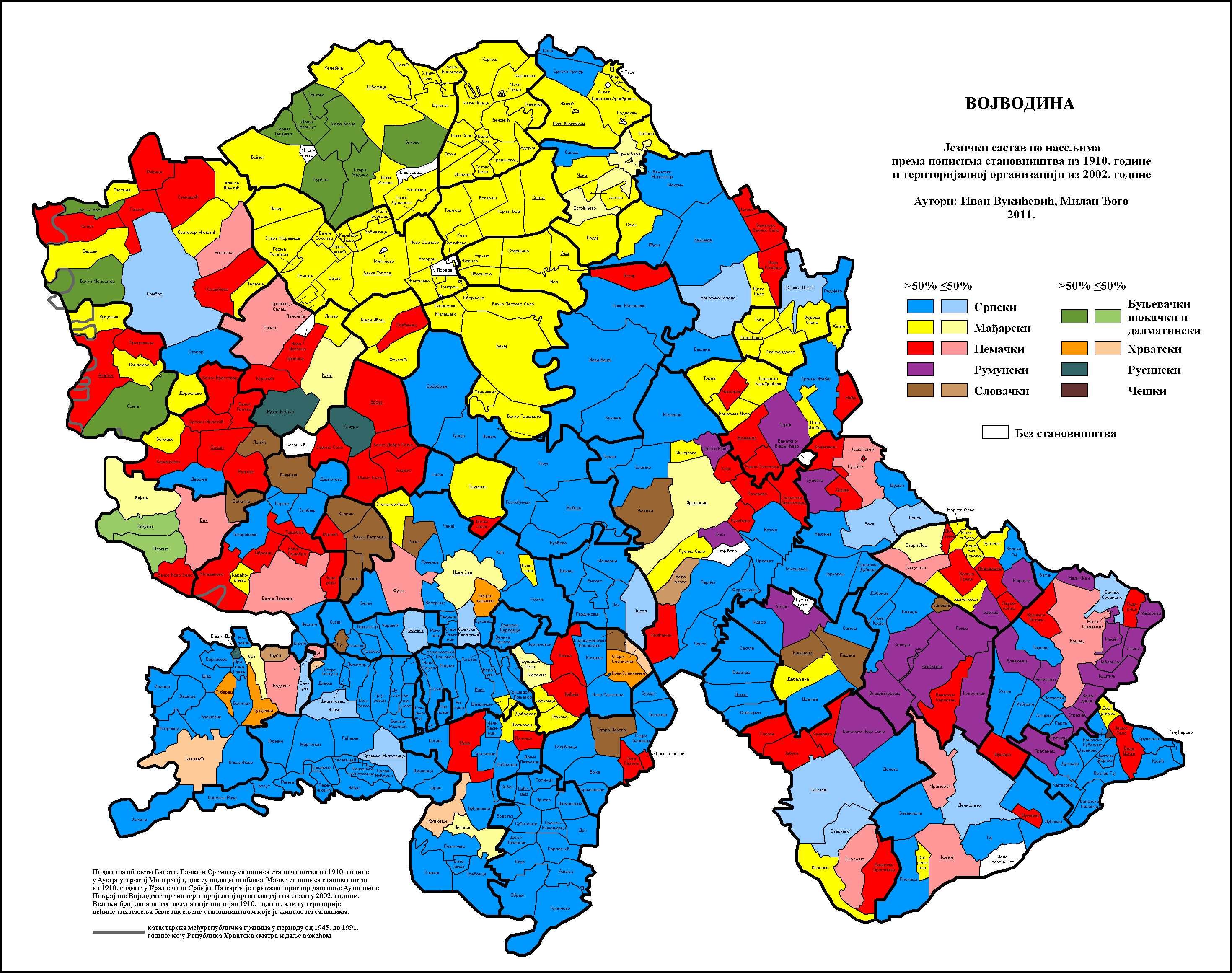
1910 census in the territory of present-day Serbian province of Vojvodina (red: German majority; pink: German plurality)

The history of Germans in the territory of present-day Serbia (in English the population is referred as Danube Swabians, in Serbian as Podunavski Nemci/Švabe, and in German as Donauschwaben) dates back to the turn of the seventeenth century and is connected with the withdrawal of the Ottoman Empire from Pannonian Basin. At that time, the Habsburg monarchy began establishing German settlements in the areas abandoned by the Turks. During Habsburg rule, Germans were privileged nationality in the Monarchy and German language was a lingua franca of the country, used by members of other ethnicities as well. After the Austro-Hungarian compromise from 1867, present-day northern Serbia was included into the Hungarian part of the Austria-Hungary and Hungarian language replaced German as a main language of administration and inter-ethnic communication.

=== Kingdom of Yugoslavia ===
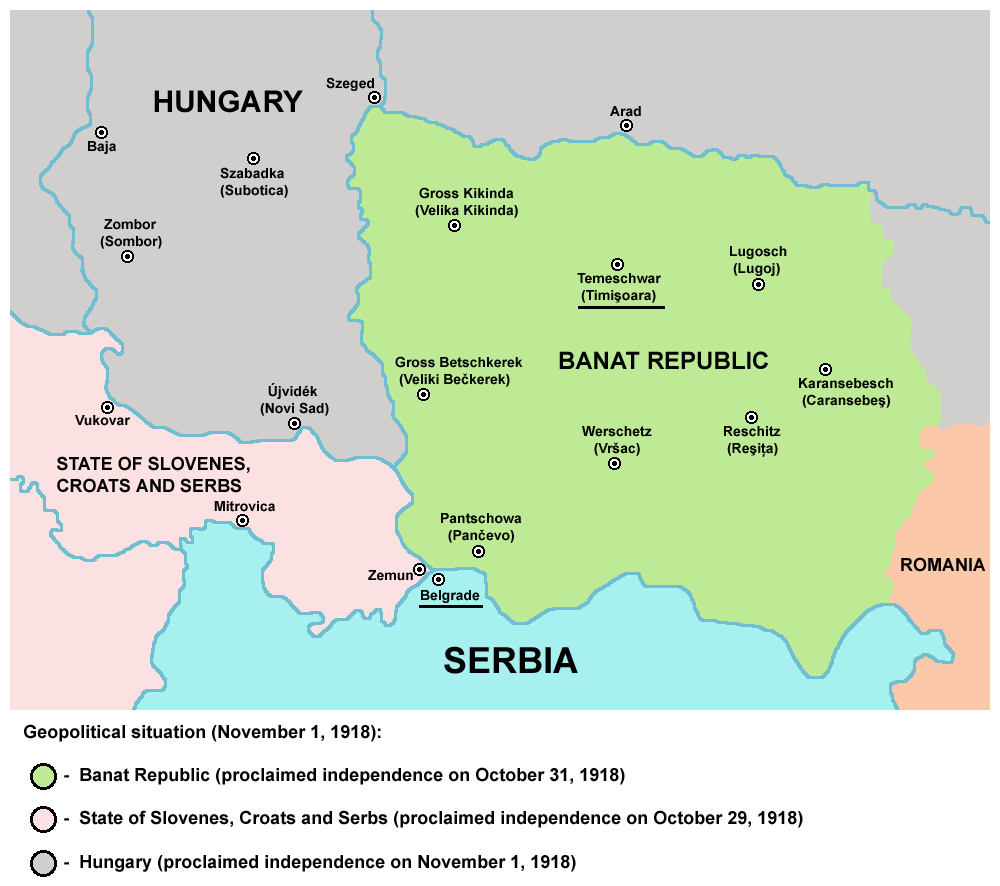
Banat Republic, proclaimed in 1918

In 1918, following the dissolution of Austria-Hungary, a short-lived Banat Republic was proclaimed in Banat region, mainly as an initiative of local Germans. Soon, the territory of this republic was divided between the newly formed Kingdom of Serbs, Croats, and Slovenes and the Kingdom of Romania. In 1929, regions of present-day Serbia that had sizable German population (Banat and Bačka) were included into the newly formed Danube Banovina province.

In the interwar period, Germans were one of the largest ethnic minorities on the territory of present-day Serbia, second only to the Hungarians. According to data from the 1931 census, Germans formed the largest part of population in the districts (srez) of Bačka Palanka, Odžaci, Kula, Apatin, and Sombor. They also formed the largest part of population in several important towns such as Vršac, Ruma, Bačka Palanka, Inđija, Vrbas, Futog, Apatin, Nova Pazova, Bela Crkva, Crvenka, Odžaci, Bački Jarak, Bač, Banatski Karlovac, Plandište, Žitište, Jaša Tomić, Sečanj, as well as in numerous villages.

=== World War II ===
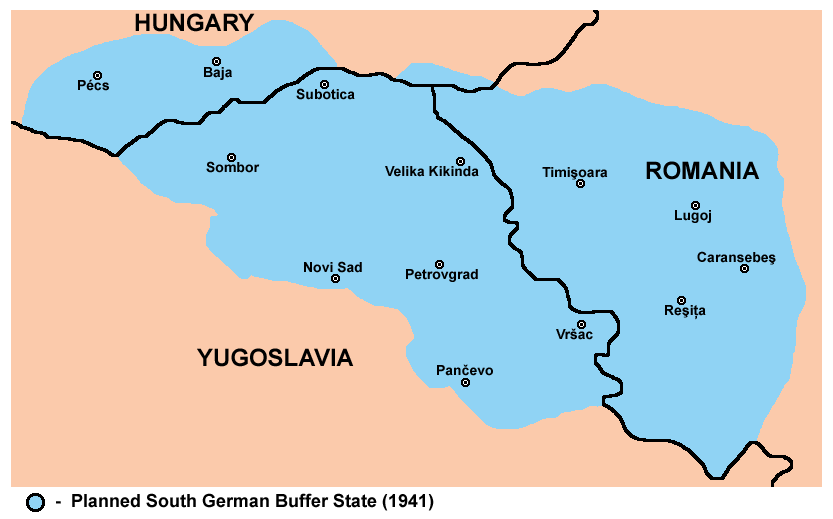
South German Buffer State, proposed in 1941

During the Axis occupation of Yugoslavia, from 1941 to 1944, Banat was an autonomous German-administered region within occupied Serbia, with approximately 120,000 (or one fifth of the Banat's population) of ethnic Germans who were mostly peasants and artisans, the administration of Banat was actually part of an abandoned plan for a South German Buffer State in the area, controlled by the Danube Swabians. The 7th SS Volunteer Mountain Division Prinz Eugen formed in 1941 from Volksdeutsche (ethnic German) volunteers from the Banat was a German mountain infantry division of the Waffen-SS, the armed wing of the German Nazi Party. The notorious SS Division committed massive war crimes against the Serbian civilian population. In 1943 Heinrich Himmler introduced compulsory military service for ethnic Germans in Serbia. The both voluntary involvement and involvement under duress of the Volksdeutsche in the occupied Banat region aided the Nazi regime in their targeted campaign towards the Jewish people.

As a consequence of the World War II events in Yugoslavia, the Yugoslav Communist government took a reprisals on ethnic citizens of German origin in Yugoslavia (including Vojvodina): they had their citizenship revoked and their belongings and houses were nationalized and taken from them. Between 1944 and 1946, a prison camp system was established for Yugoslav citizens of German origin, usually in settlements where they lived. After prison camps were abolished, ethnic Germans of Yugoslavia regained their rights and citizenship and most of them emigrated to Germany or Austria in the following years because of economic reasons.

The German military defeat in World War II resulted in flight or imprisonment of the almost entire Serbian German community (which numbered about 350,000). It is estimated that about 200,000 Germans were evacuated during the retreat of the German army, while about 140,000 who remained in the country were faced with the Yugoslav Communist government reprisals: they were sent to some of the villages cordoned off as prisons or camps where 8,049 people died from disease, hunger, malnutrition, mistreatment, and cold. They had their citizenship revoked and their belongings and houses were nationalized and taken from them. After these prison camps, run by the new communist authorities, were dissolved in 1948, most of the remaining German population left Serbia because of economic reasons. Debate is ongoing as to whether or not the violence that occurred against ethnic Germans in the post-war Yugoslavia during this time was in fact genocide.

=== Contemporary period ===
In 2007, the National Council of the German Ethnic Minority in Serbia was established. In the 2000s several monuments to the pre-World War II German population have been erected. In 2008, the Association of Danube Swabians requested that the local authorities of Sremska Mitrovica exhume the bodies of Germans who died in a post-war camp in the town.

== Notable people ==
- Ivan Bek – football player
- Ignjat Sopron – journalist and publisher
- Đorđe Vajfert – governor of the National Bank of Serbia
- Felix Milleker – historian and museum curator
- Helmar Müller – West German olympic track and field athlete
- Anna Stein – West German olympic artistic gymnast

== See also ==
- German diaspora
- List of German exonyms for places in Serbia
- Germany–Serbia relations

== Literature ==
- Zoran Janjetović (2009). Nemci u Vojvodini. INIS. ISBN 978-86-7005-073-0.
- Nenad Stefanović, Jedan svet na Dunavu, Beograd, 2003.
- Dr Anđelija Ivkov, Demografska slika Vojvodine, Beograd, 2006.
- Saša Kicošev; Drago Njerovan (2013) [2010], Razvoj etničke i verske strukture Vojvodine, Novi Sad: Prometej, ISBN 978-86-87513-20-4
- Borislav Jankulov (2003) [1961], Pregled kolonizacije Vojvodine u XVIII i XIX veku, Matica Srpska
- Dragomir Jankov, Vojvodina - propadanje jednog regiona, Novi Sad, 2004.
