= Ukrainians in Serbia =

Украјинци у Србији Українці в Сербії

Total population
- 3,969 (2022) 22,709 Ukrainian citizens (est.)

Regions with significant populations
- Vojvodina

Languages
- Ukrainian and Serbian

Religion
- Eastern Orthodoxy, Eastern Catholicism

Related ethnic groups
- Pannonian Rusyns, Russians in Serbia, Belarusians in Serbia

Ukrainians are recognized ethnic minority in Serbia. According to data from the 2022 census, there were 3,969 Ukrainians living in Serbia. They mostly live in the region of Vojvodina, more specifically in Bačka and Syrmia.

In addition to ethnic Ukrainians in the strict sense, the Ukrainian ethnic community in Serbia also includes the pro-Ukrainian part of the Rusyns, who declare themselves as Rusyns-Ukrainians, and who are gathered around the Alliance of Rusyns-Ukrainians of Serbia. Those Rusyn-Ukrainians, considered to be the Rusyn branch of the Ukrainian people, should not be confused with the ethnic Rusyns, who identify themselves with a separate Rusyn ethnicity.

== History ==
In the middle of the 18th century, during the Habsburg rule, the process of colonization of the East Slavic people to the area of the then southern Hungary (present-day Serbian province of Vojvodina) began. A part of the population that moved to the Habsburg monarchy after the abolition of the regional self-government in Zaporizhzhia (1775), settled around 1785 in the southern Hungarian areas, and mostly in the Banat Potisje. Although part of that population later returned to their old homeland, during the 19th century there were occasional arrivals of new immigrants, among whom the awareness of the origin from the Ukrainian territory was preserved.

At that time, the national development of the non-Hungarian peoples in Hungary was hampered by the state authorities, who promoted the policy of magyarization. According to the practice of that time, the Austro-Hungarian authorities classified the entire East Slavic population under the term Ruthenians (Ruthenen). When the Ukrainian national idea rose in eastern Galicia, people of Ukrainian descent from other parts of the monarchy joined the movement.

The Ukrainian idea also influenced some Carpathian Rusyns, and among the Rusyn leaders from the southern Hungarian regions who joined the Ukrainian national movement in the early 20th century was the Greek Catholic priest Havryyil Kostelnyk, a native of Ruski Krstur. His example will be followed later by some other Rusyn community leaders.

After the dissolution of Austria-Hungary (1918) and the creation of the Kingdom of Serbs, Croats, and Slovenes (Yugoslavia), more favorable circumstances arose for the development of the Ukrainian community, which was further strengthened during the Interwar period (1918-1941) following the collapse of the Ukrainian People's Republic which led to increased Ukrainian immigration to Yugoslavia. The activities of Ukrainian political immigrants were marked by frequent disputes with influential Russian political immigrants, which indirectly affected the situation among local Ukrainians, and relations within the wider East Slavic community in Yugoslavia became even more complex due to some specific processes among the local Rusyns.

During the Interwar period, the Ukrainian community expanded to include several Rusyn leaders alongside the Ukrainian national movement, resulting in a division into two currents within the then Rusyn People's Educational Society, founded in 1919, the first of which advocated preservation of the Rusyn national identity, while the other advocated the full integration of the Rusyns into the Ukrainian national corps. Under the influence of the then Greek Catholic bishop of Križevci, Dionisije Njaradi, who was a supporter of the Ukrainization of all Rusyns (both Pannonian and Carpathian), local Rusyns were gradually removed from important positions in the Rusyn People's Educational Society, and pro-Ukrainian immigrants were appointed in their place.

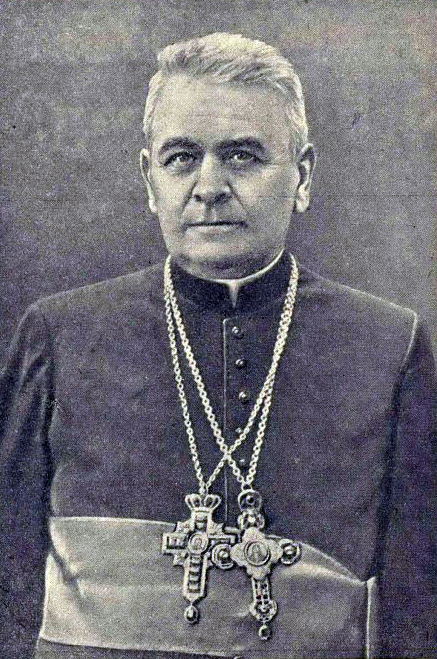
Havryyil Kostelnyk (1886–1948), a Rusyn priest who joined the Ukrainian movement

Due to a series of unresolved issues in the relations between the two communities, Ukrainian and Rusyn, after World War II, a decision was made to classify them in a common census category, so that Rusyns and Ukrainians were shown together in the 1948, 1953, and 1961 censuses, but that practice was then abandoned, starting with the 1971 census. The issue of relations between Ukrainians and Rusyns has been discussed on several occasions at various levels of government in the former Yugoslavia, especially in the area of exercising various minority rights, which related to the use of language and script, which was of particular importance in the field of school education in the mother tongue.

A significant turning point in the history of the Ukrainian community in Serbia occurred in 1990, when the representatives of Ukrainians in the former Yugoslavia reached an agreement with the pro-Ukrainian part of the Rusyns, which led to the creation of a joint organization called the Alliance of Rusyns-Ukrainian. In contrast, another part of the Rusyns, who advocated the preservation of the Rusyn identity, formed its own organization at the end of the same year under the name: Matica rusinska. The creation of the mentioned, clearly profiled organizations marked the beginning of a new phase in the process of differentiation within the Rusyn community, which was definitely divided into two currents: national (gathered around Matica rusinska) and pro-Ukrainian (gathered around the Alliance of Rusyns-Ukrainians).

After the breakup of Yugoslavia and the Soviet Union, the Ukrainian community in Serbia became more directly connected with Ukraine, which after gaining independence took care of the Ukrainian people in the diaspora. Within the wider Ukrainian community in Serbia, the pro-Ukrainian part of the Rusyns, which was gathered together with the Ukrainians in the Alliance of Rusyns-Ukrainian, received special support from the state and educational institutions of Ukraine in charge of working with the diaspora.

The adoption of new legal solutions on the exercise of ethnic minority rights in the then Federal Republic of Yugoslavia in 2002, created the preconditions for the formation of ethnic minorityy councils as special bodies of ethnic minority self-government. On that occasion, the question arose, whether the Rusyns and the Ukrainians will be represented in the joint ethnic minority council or each community will establish its own council. Based on the results of the 2002 census, two councils were established, and the first electoral assembly for the National Council of the Ukrainian Ethnic Minority was held in Kula in 2003.

Since the pro-Ukrainian part of the Rusyn leaders in Serbia, through the Alliance of Rusyns-Ukrainians, opted for the Ukrainian ethnic identity, a special subgroup of Rusyns-Ukrainians was created within the wider Ukrainian community in Serbia which continue to nurture their Rusyn identity which they consider a branch of the Ukrainian ethnicity. Their pro-Ukrainian Rusynism differs from national Rusynism, which is nurtured among members of the Rusyn people. Over time, the pro-Ukrainian part of the Rusyn ethnicity was fully integrated into the Ukrainian national corps within the Alliance of Rusyn-Ukrainians.

Unlike the mentioned Rusyn-Ukrainians, who are part of the Ukrainian ethnicity, ethnic Rusyns in Serbia are still considered part of a separate Rusyn ethnicity, which has its own minority organizations. The uniqueness of the Rusyn people is officially recognized in Serbia and some other countries, but not in Ukraine, which still does not recognize the ethnic uniqueness of the Rusyns.

Although the activities of Ukrainian organizations in Serbia are primarily aimed at developing their own national community, without challenging and endangering the equal rights of other minority communities, in some Ukrainian circles there are occasional tendencies to deny the ethnic identity of Rusyns. Referring to the mentioned phenomena, a former Yugoslav diplomat and one of the prominent Rusyns, Mihajlo Hornjak, stated in 2005 that "to tell a Rusyn that he is Ukrainian is the same as to tell a Ukrainian that he is Russian".

Following the Russian invasion of Ukraine, the Ministry of Internal Affairs of Serbia stated that 22,709 Ukrainian citizens have registered residence in Serbia. These numbers include all temporary passing residence and registered refugees, including statistics from required registration after 90 days of visa free residence. Because of this, actual number of residence with Ukrainian citizenship is smaller from the statistical numbers given by the Ministry of Internal Affairs.

== Demographics ==
Prior to the 1971 census, Ukrainians were classified together with the Rusyns:

Census	Ukrainians
1971	5,643
1981	5,520
1991	5,042
2002 (excl. Kosovo)	5,354
2011 (excl. Kosovo)	4,903
2022 (excl. Kosovo)	3,969

According to the results of the 2011 census, 94.7% of the Ukrainians in Serbia belong to Christian denominations, out of which 57.5% are Eastern Orthodox, 36.1% Greek Catholics, while the rest are adherents of other Christian communities.

== Culture ==
Ukrainians are represented through the National Council of the Ukrainian Ethnic Minority. The realization of the minority rights of the Ukrainian community in Serbia is a special area of mutual cooperation within the relations between Serbia and Ukraine. They speak Ukrainian and use Ukrainian Cyrillic script.

Ukrainians in Serbia speak their mother tongue, Ukrainian, which is officially recognized by state authorities as the language of the Ukrainian ethnic minority. As part of the implementation of the European Charter for Regional or Minority Languages, which was ratified in Serbia in 2006, the status of the Ukrainian language as a full-fledged minority language was confirmed. Despite that, the official recognition of Ukrainian as a minority language in Serbia is not fully respected in the practice of the two Serbian national libraries: National Library of Serbia and the library of Matica srpska. In the practice of the above mentioned libraries, UDC number for Ukrainian literature in Serbia is actually the number for Rusyn literature in Serbia. This practice is incorrect according to the literary work of Ukrainians in Serbia, since the number belonging to them and their literature is used to denote a bibliographic category in whose name the Ukrainian name is not even mentioned. Regional public broadcaster, Radio Television of Vojvodina, airs a TV program in Ukrainian called Ukraijna Panorama.

The most important cultural and educational organization of Ukrainians in Serbia is the Society for Ukrainian Language, Literature, and Culture "Prosveta" (Prosvita).

== See also ==
- Ukrainian diaspora
- Serbia–Ukraine relations
- Serbs in Ukraine
