= Draga Ljočić =

Serbian feminist and physician

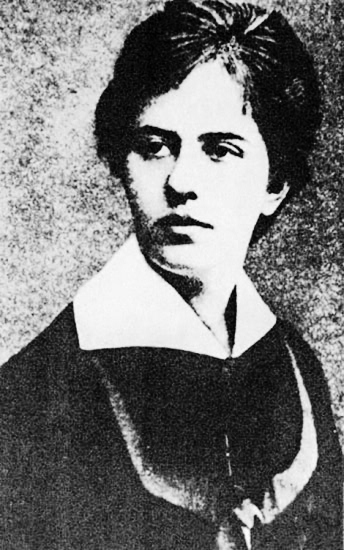
- Ljočić, c. 1885
- Born: 22 February 1855; Šabac, Principality of Serbia
- Died: 5 November 1926 (aged 71); Belgrade, Kingdom of Serbs, Croats and Slovenes
- Occupations: physician, political activist

Draga Ljočić Milošević (22 February 1855 – 5 November 1926) was a Serbian physician and feminist. She became the first Serbian woman to be accepted at the University of Zürich in Switzerland. She worked as a medical assistant in the army and became the first Serbian female doctor in medicine. She was also a leading figure within the newly founded Serbian women's rights movement. She was the first female doctor in the Balkan Wars and the Great War, and one of only a dozen women working as doctors in Europe at that time.

== Biography ==
Draga Ljočić Milošević was a Serbian physician and feminist. She was born on 22 February 1855, in Sabac in Serbia. She graduated from the Belgrade Lyceum in 1872, and that same year became the first Serbian woman to be accepted at the University of Zürich in Switzerland, where she studied medicine. Her brother Đura Ljočić had graduated from the university two years earlier.

During the war between Serbia and the Ottoman Empire, Ljočić worked as a medical assistant in the army and received the grade of a Lieutenant. Returning to her studies afterwards, she graduated in 1879 and thereby became the first Serbian female doctor in medicine. Ljočić studied surgical gynecology under F. Frankenhäuser, and her dissertation was on the surgical treatment of uterine fibromyomas.

Gaining permission to practice was not easy. Ljočić requested that a licence be issued based on her university qualifications, as would have been done for her male colleagues, but her requests were refused several times. Eventually, after the intercession of Queen Natalia and political leader Stojan Bošković, a commission was appointed to examine Ljočić on medical theory and practice. The commission granted her a licence and she was permitted to practice in Serbia in 1881, although she struggled to gain a position. She was appointed to the General State Hospital in 1881, where she managed the women’s ward but on the salary of a medical assistant. After advocating to be appointed to the position that she was performing, of managing the women’s department, she was instead dismissed from the hospital in December 1889, and went into private practice.

Ljočić was a full member of the Serbian Medical Society. She was also the first female doctors in the Balkan Wars and the Great War, and one of only a dozen women working as doctors in Europe at that time. Due to her advocacy for equal pay, she was also a leading figure within the newly founded Serbian women's rights movement. Ljočić also translated works in the field of pediatrics; she translated from Russian Dr. Marija Manasejina's book Raising Young Children, to improve mother's knowledge of how to raise their babies.

She was married to politician Raša Milošević, and the couple had five children together. Both her husband and her brother Đura Ljočić were founder members of the People's Radical Party. She died in Belgrade on 5 November 1926.

== Tribute ==
On 22 February 2016, Google Doodle commemorated her 161st birthday.

== Dissertation ==
- Draga Ljocic: Ein Beitrag zur operativen Therapie der Fibromyome des Uterus, Zürich 1878, OCLC 610734169(Dissertation Universität Zürich 1878, 115 Seiten).

== See also ==
- Maria Fjodorovna Zibold
