= Serbs in Ukraine =

Серби в Україні Срби у Украјини Srbi u Ukrajini

Total population
- 623 (2001)

Languages
- Ukrainian, Russian, Serbian

Religion
- Eastern Orthodoxy

Related ethnic groups
- Serbs in Russia, Serbs in Belarus

Serbs in Ukraine are Ukrainian citizens of ethnic Serb descent and/or Serbia-born persons living in Ukraine. According to the data from the 2001 census, there were 623 people that declared Serb ethnicity, out of whom 219 had Serbian citizenship, 218 Russian, 104 Ukrainian, and 68 other.

== History ==
Numerous Serb names have been recorded in the Zaporozhian Cossack registiry composed during the Khmelnytsky Uprising in 1649. Serb mercenaries were employed by hetman Ivan Vyhovsky. Several military figures of Serb origin served as colonels of the Cossack Hetmanate, most prominently Rodion Dmytrashko-Raycha, who headed the Pereyaslav Regiment in 1667-1677 and 1687-1688. Mykhailo Hrushevsky and other historians theorized, that the development of Ukrainian duma songs could have taken place under the influence of Serb folk singers who travelled to the country during the 15th and 16th centuries.

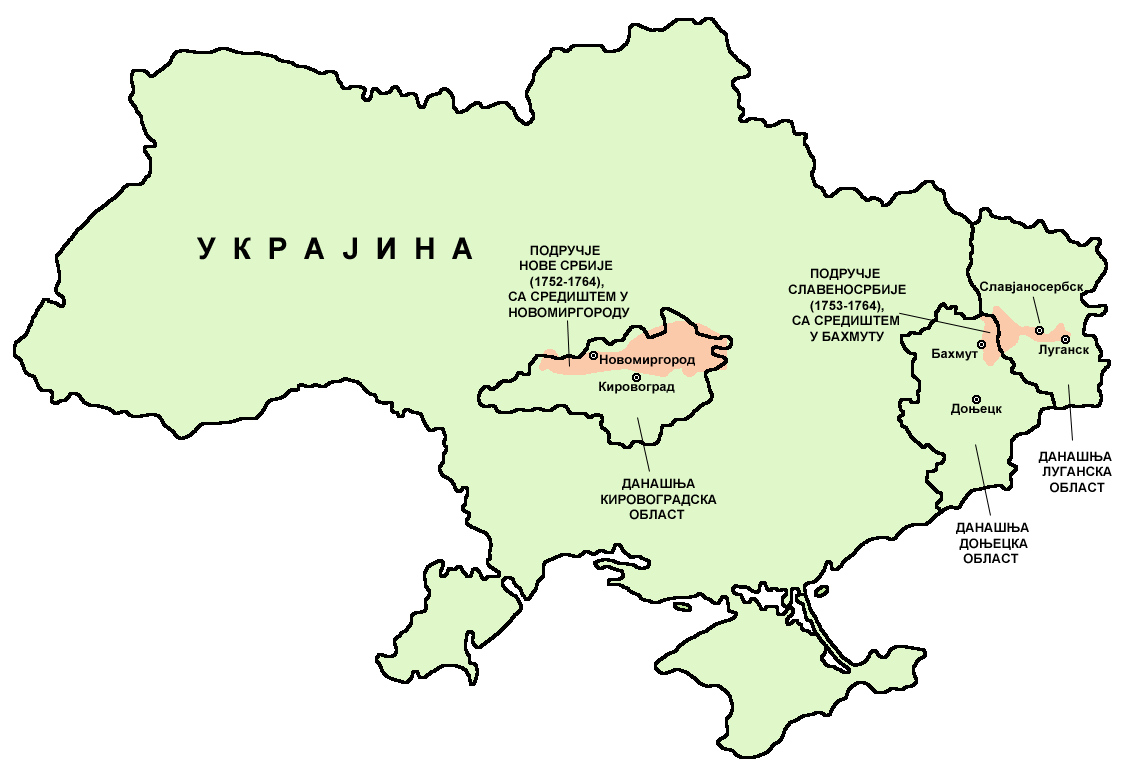
Historical Serb-populated regions in Ukraine (marked in orange)

During the 18th century, numerous Sebs studied at the Kyiv Mohyla Academy, among them Jovan Rajić. Following the Russo-Turkish War of 1711, a number of Serb families (Vladislavić, Miloradović and several others) joined the side of tsar Peter I of Russia and were granted titles of Cossack starshyna, receiving landholdings in Ukraine. Some of their descendants would take an active part in the civic and cultural life of Ukraine under Russian rule.

Serb emigrants from Austrian-occupied territories took part in the colonization of Southern Ukraine during the mid-18th century. In 1752-1753 New Serbia and Slavo-Serbia were established as administrative units populated by Serbs, Vlachs and other immigrants. In 1764 those territories were incorporated by the Novorossiya Governorate. Many Serbs eventually settled in lands of the Zaporozhian Sich, taking part in the haidamak uprisings, including Koliivshchyna; others served in the ranks of Russian Imperial Army. Eventually, most Serbs in the region assimilated with the Ukrainian population.

Serb writer, folklorist and linguist Vuk Karadžić visited Ukraine in 1819 and produced an important influence on the Ukrainian national revival and development of Ukrainian literature. Serb grammar developed by Karadžić became a model for the establishment of Ukrainian phonetic orthography. Several Serbian scientists, among them Aleksandar Belić, Stojan Bošković and Jovan Cvijić, were elected fellows of Shevchenko Scientific Society.

== Notable people ==
- Andrei Miloradovich – military officer
- Mikhail Miloradovich – military officer and governor
- Vasyl Karazin – founder of Kharkiv University
- Nikolai Kibalchich – revolutionary and inventor
- Yevgeny Vuchetich – sculptor
- Marko Devich – football player
- Zlata Ognevich – singer
Marko Dević

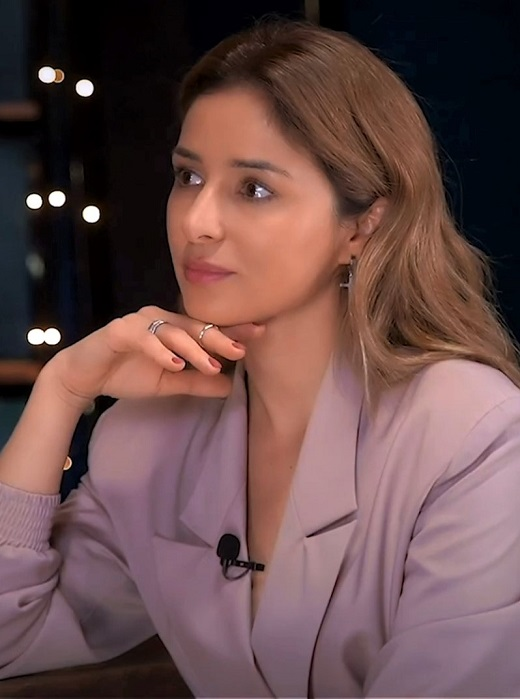
Zlata Ognevich

== See also ==
- Serbia–Ukraine relations
- Serb diaspora

== Sources ==
- Cerović, Ljubivoje (2002). Срби у Украјини. Novi Sad: Muzej Vojvodine: Srpsko-ukrajinsko društvo. ISBN 86-82077-16-7. Archived from the original on 2014-01-11.
- Дмитрієв, В.С., 2006. Серби в Україні (XVIII-початок XIX ст.).
- Стрижок, О., 1993. Серби в Україні. Україна: наука і культура,-К, p. 257.
- Дмитрієв, В.С., 2005. Сербські переселенці в Україні: проблема міжетнічних зв’язків. Вісник Національного університету імені Тараса Шевченка. Історія, pp. 77–79.
