= Belarusians in Serbia =

Белоруси у Србији Беларусы ў Сербіі

Total population
- 5,501 Belarusian citizens (est.)

Regions with significant populations
- Belgrade, Novi Sad

Languages
- Russian and Serbian

Religion
- Eastern Orthodoxy

Related ethnic groups
- Russians in Serbia, Ukrainians in Serbia, Pannonian Rusyns

Belarusians in Serbia are mainly recent immigrants. Following the Russian invasion of Ukraine in 2022, some 5,501 citizens of Belarus arrived in Serbia. This figure includes all temporary passing residence and registered immigrants, including statistics from required registration after 30 days of visa-free residence.

== See also ==
- Immigration to Serbia
- Belarusian diaspora
- Belarus–Serbia relations
