= Kosovo–Ukraine relations =

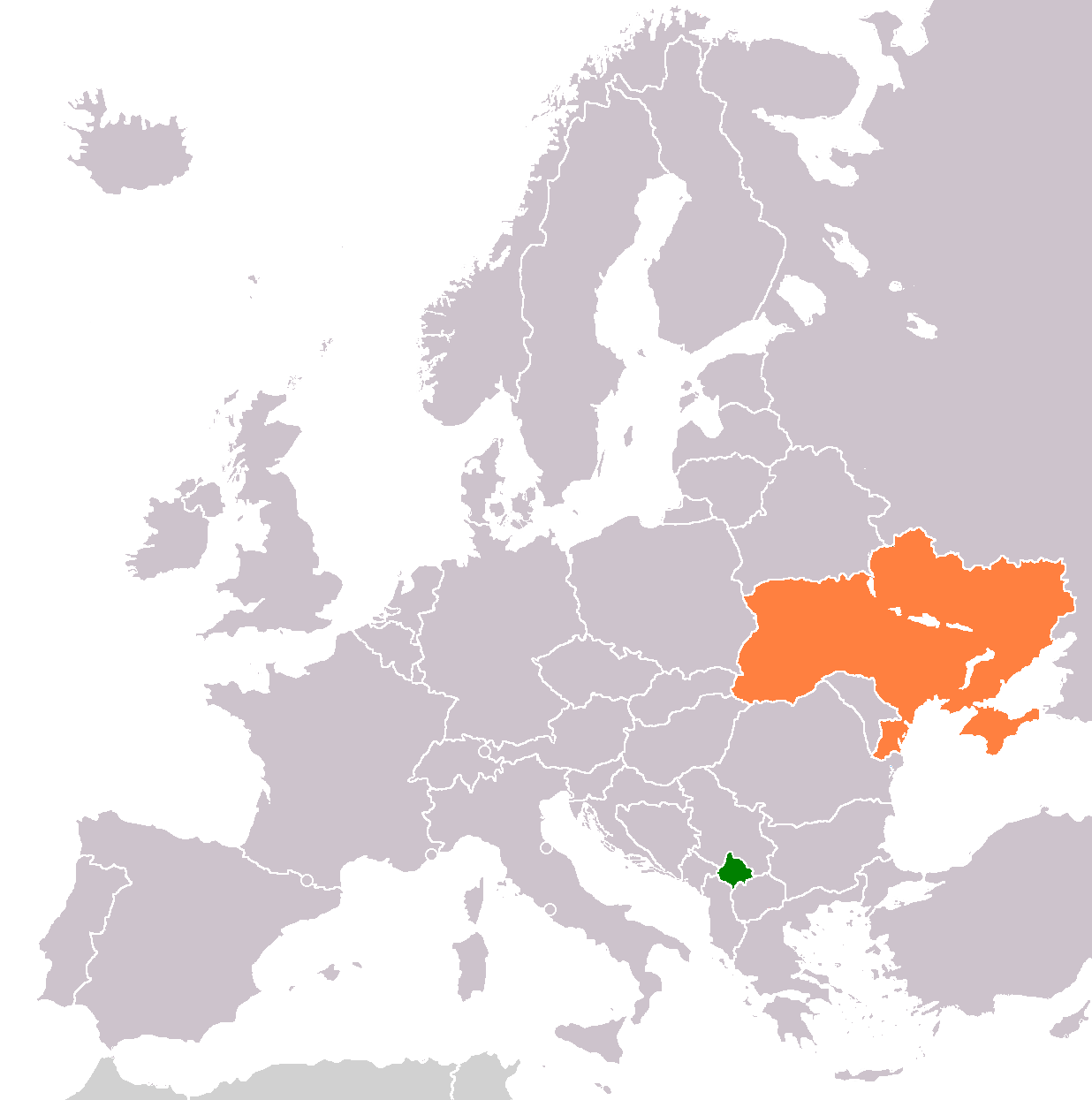
- Kosovo: Ukraine

Kosovo–Ukraine relations are the bilateral diplomatic contacts between Ukraine and Kosovo.

Ukraine does not recognize the independence of Kosovo, considering its territory part of Republic of Serbia. After the Kosovo War, a Ukrainian contingent was stationed in Kosovo as part of the international forces led by NATO. In August 2022, as a result of Russian aggression and the subsequent curtailment of Ukrainian peacekeeping missions around the world, Ukraine requested its withdrawal.

Since 2019 Ukraine recognizes Kosovo's general civil passports, but does not accept diplomatic and service passports.

After Russia recognized the independence of the Donetsk People's Republic (DPR) and Luhansk People's Republic (LPR), Kosovo's Ministry of Foreign Affairs expressed solidarity with Ukraine against Russian aggression, stating that Putin has waged war against democracy. Kosovo also urged the free world to respond to Putin and his proxies with resolve.

Following the annexation of Crimea in 2014 and during the Russian invasion of Ukraine since 2022, the government of Kosovo imposed sanctions against Russia and Belarus. Also in March 2022, the Kosovo authorities decided to abolish visas for Ukrainian citizens.

On 18 January 2024, Kosovo's Ministry of Defence announced that a contingent of 26 instructors would be sent to the United Kingdom to join the program to assist with the training of Ukrainian soldiers.

== See also ==
- Foreign relations of Kosovo
- Foreign relations of Ukraine
- Accession of Kosovo to the EU
- Accession of Ukraine to the EU
- Ukraine's reaction to the 2008 Kosovo declaration of independence
