= Russians in Serbia =

Ethnic group

Руси у Србији Русские в Сербии

Total population
- 10,486 (2022) 53,000 Russian citizens (est.)

Regions with significant populations
- Belgrade: 4,238
- Vojvodina: 4,208

Languages
- Russian and Serbian

Religion
- Eastern Orthodoxy

Related ethnic groups
- Belarusians in Serbia, Ukrainians in Serbia

Russians are recognized ethnic minority in Serbia. They include both Serbian citizens of ethnic Russian descent or Russian-born people residing in Serbia, numbering 10,486 people according to data from the 2022 census. Since the start of the war in Ukraine in 2022, more than 300,000 Russian nationals have entered Serbia of which some 53,000 settled in the country i.e. had been issued a residence permit.

== History ==
=== First wave of immigration ===
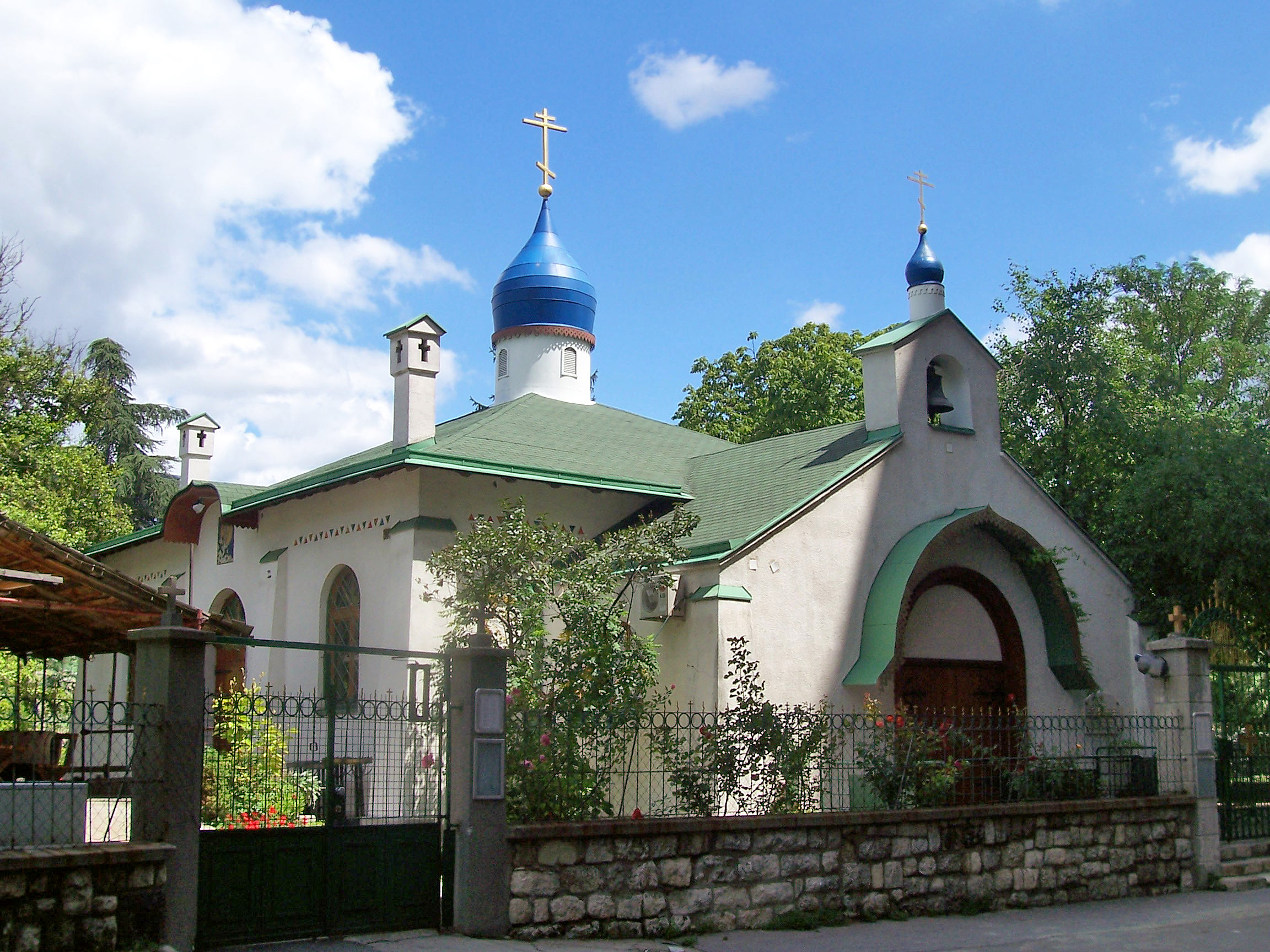
Church of the Holy Trinity in Belgrade

The mass resettlement of Russians in Serbia is associated with the Russian Revolution of 1917 and the subsequent Russian Civil War.

Leaving Odessa on 3–6 April, the first major large group of refugees from Russia (about 1,600 people) reached the Kingdom of Serbs, Croats and Slovenes in May 1919. Some emigrants moved to Serbia later, a few years later, after living in other European countries. A significant part of the emigrants of the first wave later moved further to other European countries. By the beginning of the 1920s, several hundred Russian settlers remained from the first wave in the Kingdom of Serbs, Croats, and Slovenes.

In January 1920, the authorities of the Kingdom of Serbs, Croats and Slovenes agreed to receive a new group of migrants from Russia numbering 8,000 people. The first groups began to arrive at the end of January, the main part of the refugees reached Serbia in March–April, but during the summer of 1920 the influx of new groups of immigrants from Russia continued.

The defeat of the White movement in Russia led to a mass exodus of opponents of the Bolsheviks. The Kingdom of Serbs, Croats, and Slovenes received some 20,000 Russian emigrants who reached the shores of the country in November–December 1920, a significant part of which arrived from Istanbul and the camp at Gallipoli.

Later on, separate groups of Russian refugees continued to move to the territory of Serbia. For example, at the end of 1922, 983 disabled Russians were transported from the sanatoriums of Istanbul, and in February 1924, 367 students of the Khabarovsk Cadet Corps and 21 officers of the Far Eastern Army came from Shanghai.

According to estimates, at the end of 1921, about 42,500 Russian emigrants lived in the Kingdom of Serbs, Croats, and Slovenes. In late 1920s, due to resettlement in other countries and natural decline (the death rate exceeded the birth rate), the number of Russian refugees decreased and stabilized in Yugoslavia at the level of 32-35 thousand people. More than two-thirds of them lived in Serbia.

Since 1921, an emigrant Russian church administration (later Russian Orthodox Church Outside of Russia) headed by Metropolitan of Kiev Anthony Khrapovitsky was located in the Serbian town of Sremski Karlovci. The Council of Bishops of the Serbian Orthodox Church decided to grant administrative independent jurisdiction over the Russian emigre clergy to the Supreme Church Administration of Metropolitan Anthony Khrapovitsky.) Until his death in 1936, Metropolitan Anthony Khrapovitsky was the de facto leader of all Russian refugees in Yugoslavia, also claiming to be the spiritual leader of the entire Russian diaspora. However, under his successor, Metropolitan Anastasius (who lived in Sremski Karlovci until 1944), the real center of influence in the Russian Orthodox Church Outside of Russia shifted from Sremski Karlovci to Berlin.

=== World War II and Cold War ===
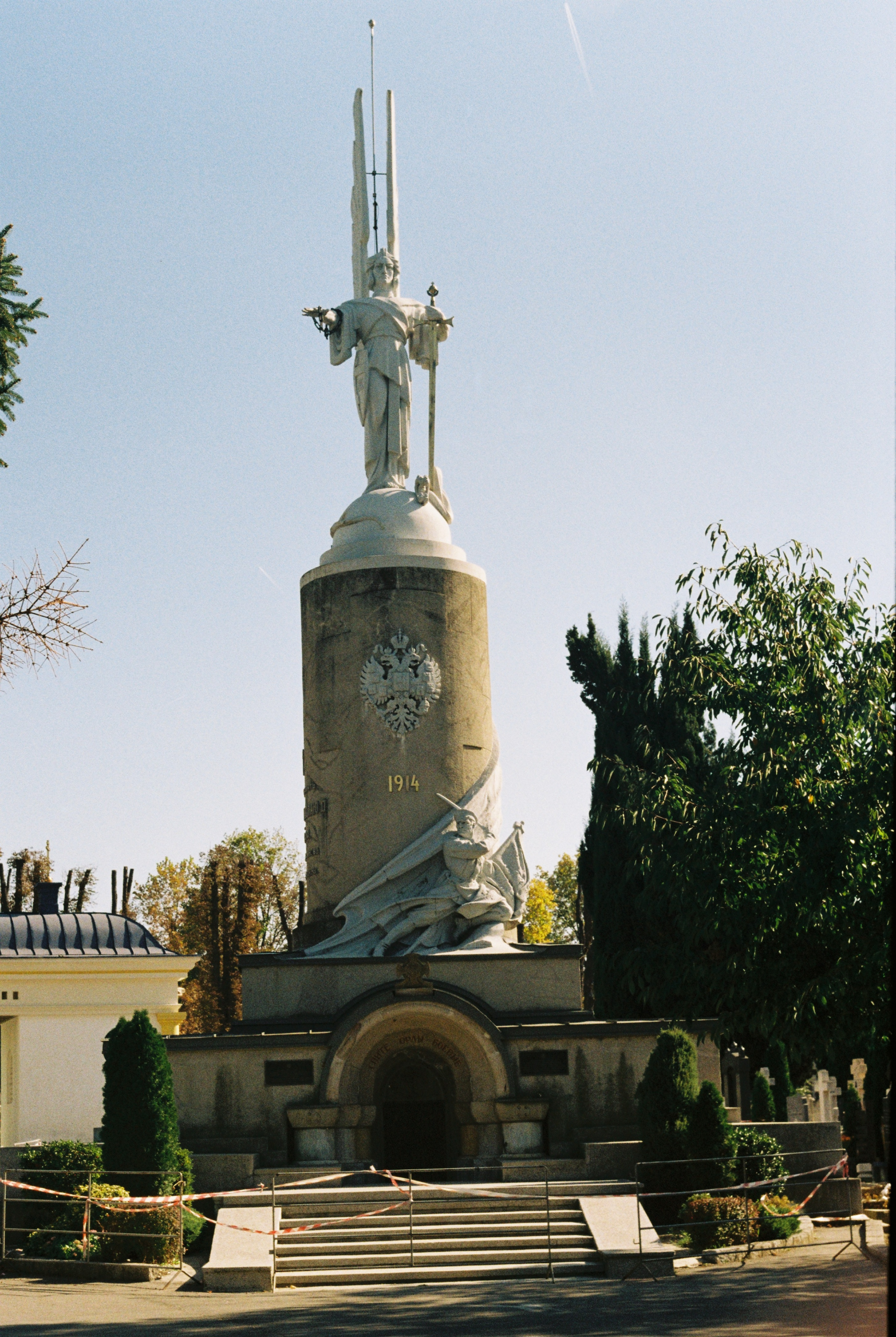
The Russian Necropolis in Belgrade

During the Second World War, the number of Russians in Serbia was about 20,000 people, most of whom were anti-communist and anti-Soviet.

In September 1941, at the initiative of Major General Mikhail Fedorovich Skorodumov, the German authorities allowed the creation of the Russian Protective Corps, in which at least 3 thousand Russian emigrants from Yugoslavia managed to serve during the war years (soon came under the command of General Boris Aleksandrovich Shteifon). Nevertheless, the overwhelming majority of the German occupation authorities were negative. After the liberation of Serbia in the autumn of 1944, the situation became dangerous for the Russian diaspora in Serbia - about a third of the most active and young Russian emigrants left the country, fleeing from SMERSH, and all Russian cultural and educational institutions were closed. After 1944, the Russian emigration in Serbia ceased to exist as a single socio-cultural organism. Tito–Stalin split in 1948 finally finished off the Russian emigration in Serbia. It is noteworthy that the first harsh note of the Stoviet Foreign Ministry (not a party, but a state criticism of the Soviet Union against Yugoslavia) was sent to Belgrade precisely in connection with violations of the rights and persecution of Russian emigrants.

In the period from 1948 to 1953, Russian emigrants were fired from their jobs, detained and beaten by law enforcement agencies of Tito's Yugoslavia. As a result, a "second exodus" occurred, which finally changed the now biological fate of Russian emigrants. The rest lived in a dispersed state, they were afraid to maintain contact with each other, their children did not speak Russian for the most part, and in case of origin from mixed marriages, they tried not to declare themselves Russian. As a result, the process of assimilation has done its job - in modern Serbia, the descendants of Russian emigrants born after 1953, as a rule, do not speak Russian, and do not declare themselves Russian.

These persecutions ceased immediately after the elimination of political pressure from the Tito regime, which reconciled with the Soviet Union after the death of Stalin. Since the 1960s, Russian wives of Serbian husbands began to actively arrive in Serbia, becoming the next, "Soviet" wave of immigration. Many of them managed to instill in their children national feelings and teach the Russian language. Their life in blooming Yugoslavia was not cloudless, the authorities made it difficult to obtain citizenship, were reluctant to nostrify diplomas, and there were problems with employment. At the same time, education in the national language in Serbia was impossible until the mid-1990s, when the school at the Soviet Embassy in Belgrade, which had existed since the 1970s, began to accept Serbian citizens for education. At the same time, in the 1990s, a new wave of Russian emigrants "Russian" arrived in Serbia. Unlike the previous one, it (albeit in small numbers) was attended by men. Thus, Serbian citizens again began to be born in Serbia with Russian surnames, for whom Russian was the main language. The vast majority of the young generation of modern Russian-speaking citizens of Serbia are descendants of the "Soviet" and "Russian" waves of emigration.

=== Second wave of immigration ===
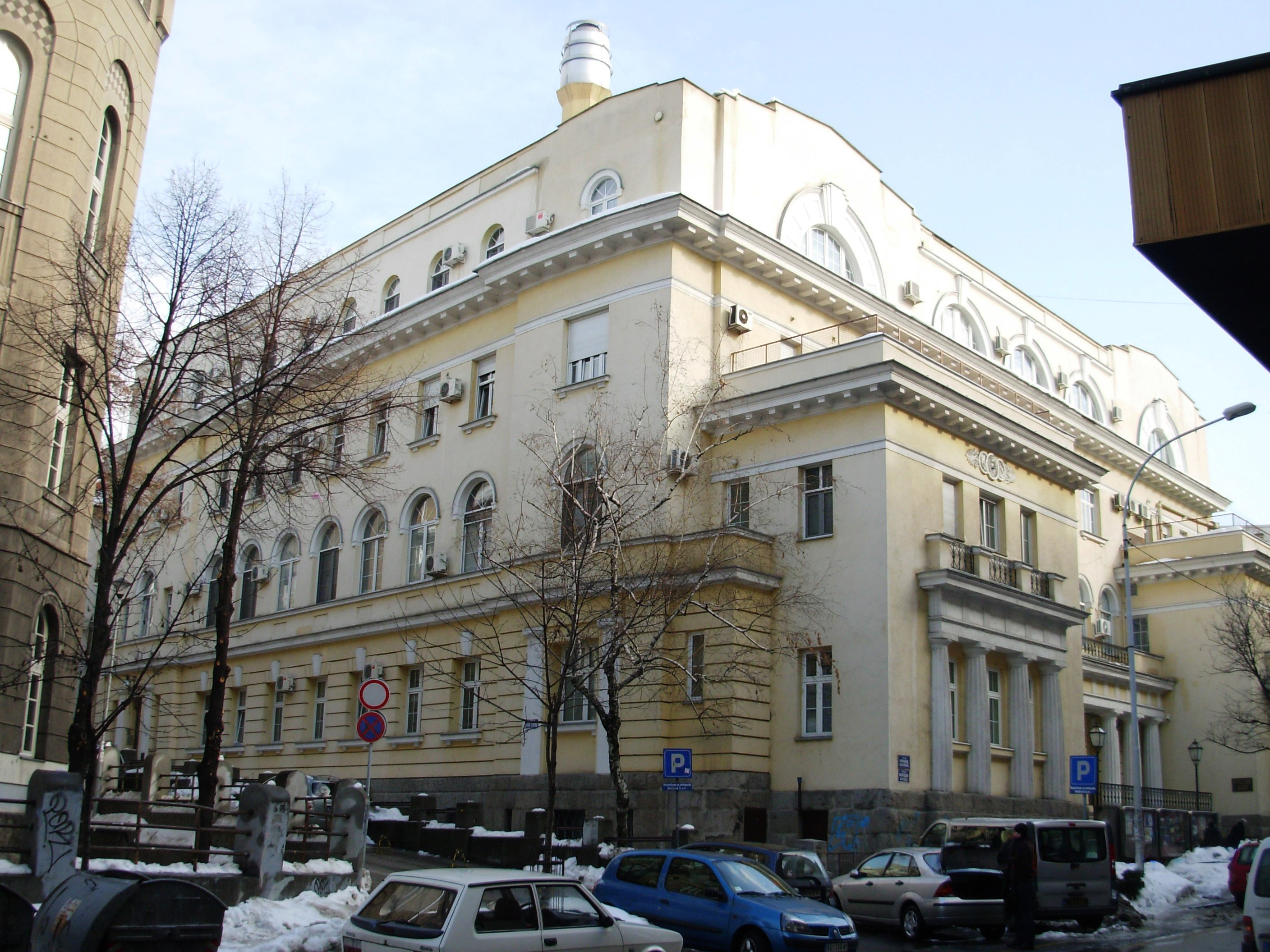
The Russian Center of Science and Culture, Belgrade in Belgrade

According to data by the Ministry of Internal Affairs of Serbia, following the Russian invasion of Ukraine in 2022, more than 300,000 Russian nationals have entered Serbia since 2022, of which some 53,000 settled in the country i.e. had been issued a residence permit. Initial waves consisted of mostly young Russians (with their families) that worked in IT sector, and have since reopened or registered their firms and companies in Serbia. Larger wave occurred after the 2022 Russian mobilization. The majority of immigrants initially moved to Belgrade, but some since then moved to northern cities like Novi Sad and Subotica. They cited several reasons for this relocations, including a preference for the cities' calmness, more of a Central European mentality and cultural atmosphere, which they found more appealing compared to the chaotic and less organized nature of Belgrade.

Russian migrants are mostly welcomed in Serbian society, but there have been tensions between pro-Putin Serbian nationalists and anti-war, pro-opposition Russian emigrants. Some anti-war Russians have been labeled a potential 'national security' risk by the Serbian authorities and face deportation to Russia.

== Demographics ==
Some 83% of Russians living in the country reside in two largest cities: primarily Belgrade, and, to a lesser degree, Novi Sad.

Year	Population
1937	16,500
1948	13,329
1953	7,829
1961	6,984
1971	4,746
1981	2,761
1991	2,473
2002 (excl. Kosovo)	2,588
2011 (excl. Kosovo)	3,247
2022 (excl. Kosovo)	10,486

== Notable people ==
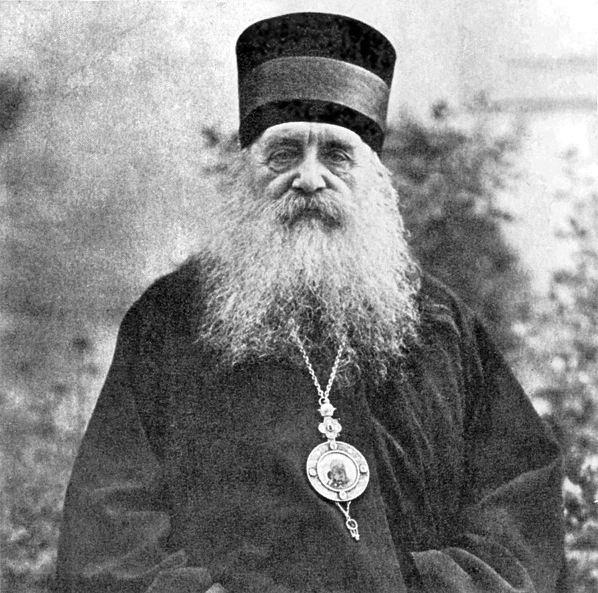
Antony Khrapovitsky

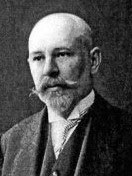
Nikolay Krasnov

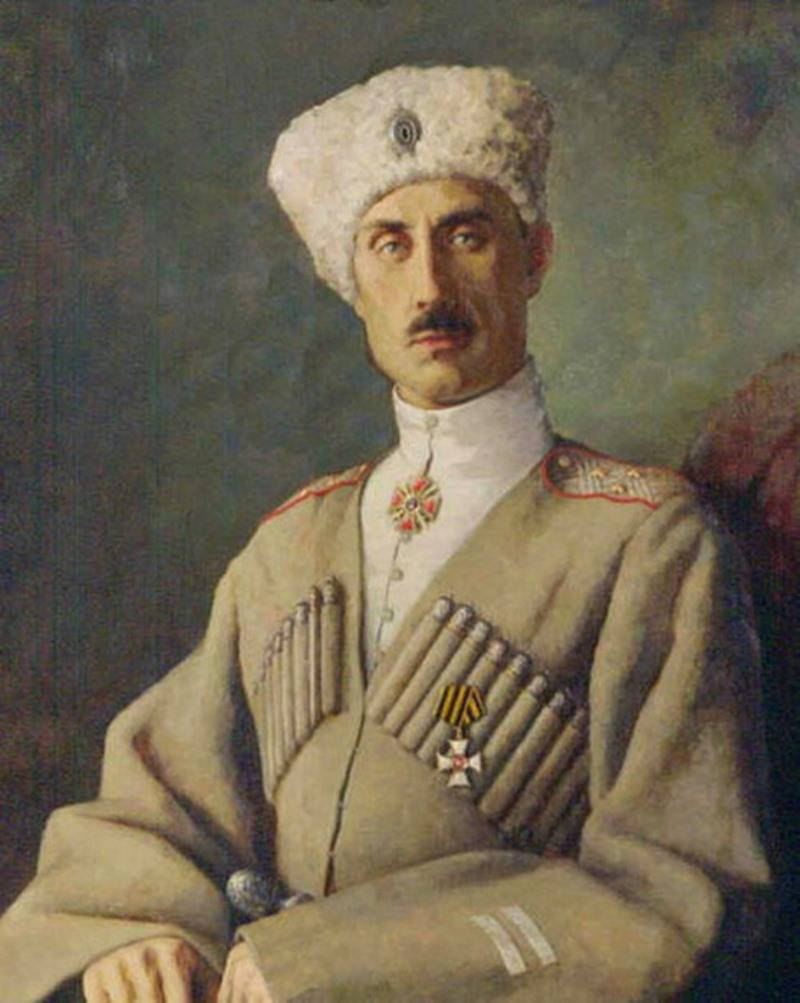
Pyotr Wrangel

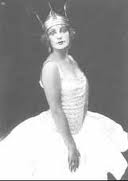
Nina Kirsanova

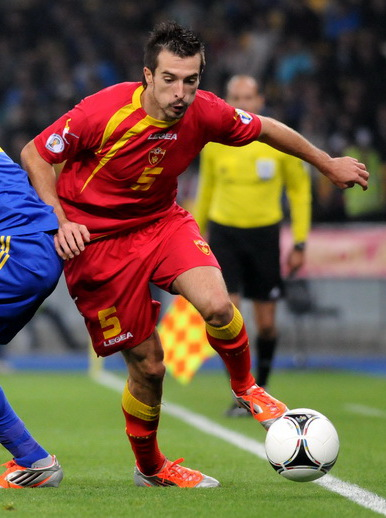
Vladimir Volkov

- Nikolay Afanasiev – theologian
- Irina Antanasijević – philologist, Ukraine-born
- Béla of Macsó – duke of Macsó
- Antonina Dubinina – figure skater, Russia-born
- Dmitrij Gerasimenko – judoka, Russia-born
- Olja Ivanjicki – painter and sculptor
- Aleksije Jelačić – historian
- Nina Kirsanova – ballet dancer
- Aleksey Khrapovitsky – Metropolitan of Kiev and Galicia
- Nikolay Krasnov – architect
- Stepan Kolesnikoff – painter
- Đorđe Lobačev – comics author and illustrator
- Maria Manakova – chess player, Russia-born
- Rostislav Mikhailovich – prince of Novgorod
- Nikolina and Olivera Moldovan – canoers, maternal Russian ancestry
- Viktor Nikitin – pilot
- George Ostrogorsky – historian
- Đorđe Prudnikov – painter, graphic artist, and designer
- Svetlana Prudnikova – chess player, Russia-born
- Anatoli Rogozhin – Cossack officer
- Grigorije Samojlov – architect, designer, and painter
- Vasily Shulgin – politician
- Alexander Soloviev – jurist and historian
- Vladimir Strzhizhevsky – flying ace pilot
- Leonid Šejka – painter and architect
- Viktor Troicki – tennis player
- Vladimir Volkov – football player
- Arkady Vyatchanin – swimmer, Russia-born
- Pyotr Wrangel – general

== See also ==
- Immigration to Serbia
- Russian diaspora
- Russia–Serbia relations
- Russian Party
