= Serbs in Belarus =

Сербы ў Беларусі Срби у Белорусији Srbi u Belorusiji

Total population
- ~500 (est.)

Regions with significant populations
- Minsk

Languages
- Serbian and Russian

Religion
- Eastern Orthodoxy

Related ethnic groups
- Serbs in Russia, Serbs in Ukraine

Serbs in Belarus are Belarus citizens of ethnic Serb descent and/or Serbia-born persons living in Belarus. It is estimated that around 500 Serbs, mostly expatriates live in Belarus.

== History ==
In World War I, there were several camps in Minsk, Gomel, and other places where Serb volunteers gathered. It is known that around three hundred Serbs from Bačka and Baranya fought in Belarus as part of fifty partisan units in World War II, evidenced by the lists from the former Party Museum in Minsk. There is a Serbian Center in Minsk.

== Notable people ==
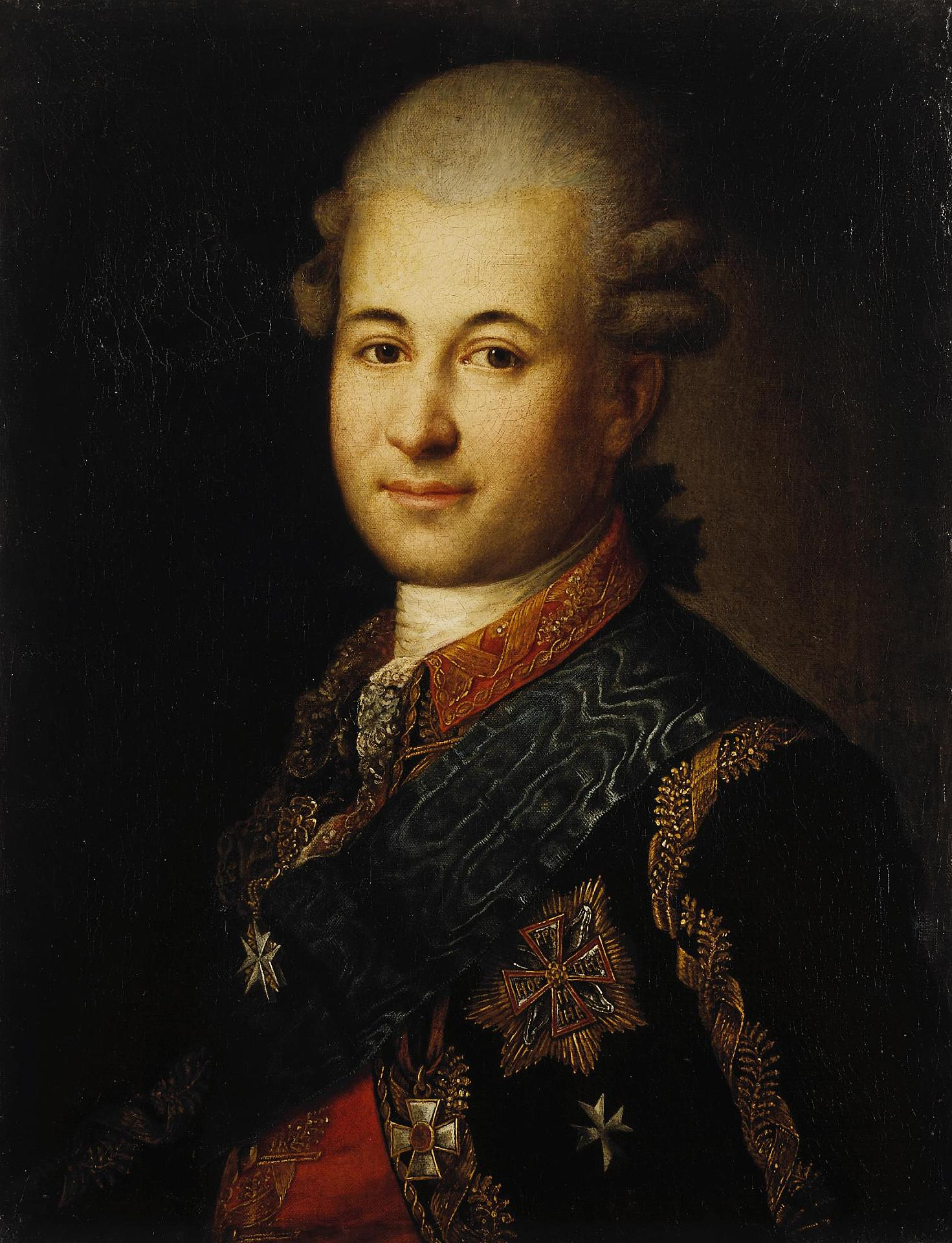
Simeon Zorić

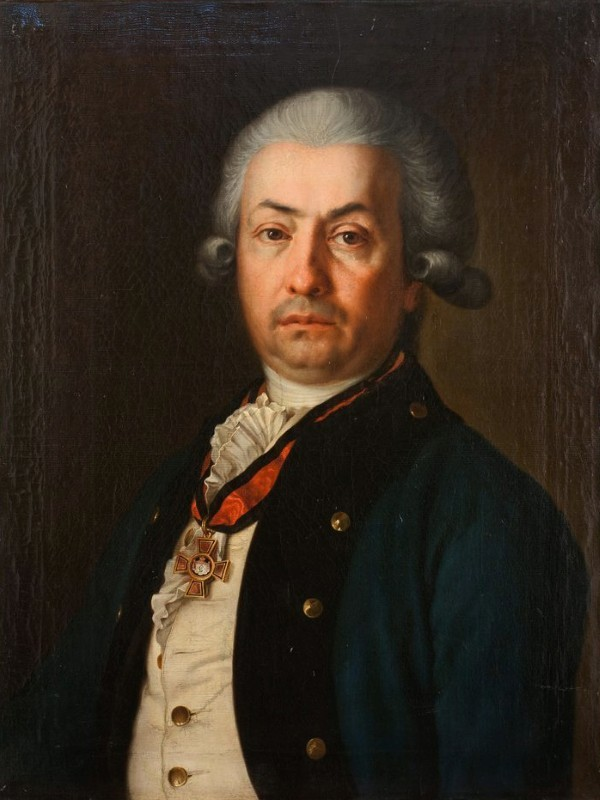
Teodor Janković Mirijevski

- Vladimir Picheta – rector and professor of the University of Minsk, member of the Russian and Belarusian academies of science
- Simeon Piščević – Imperial Russian general, governor of the Mahiliou Governorate
- Danilo Srdić – lieutenant-general of the Red Army, member of the Central Committee of the Communist Party of Belarus and the Central Executive Committee of the Belarusian Soviet Socialist Republic
- Viktar Vuyachych – singer
- Simeon Zorić – Imperial Russian lieutenant-general and count of the Holy Roman Empire, landowner in eastern Belarus

== See also ==
- Serb diaspora
- Belarus–Serbia relations
