= Belarus–Kosovo relations =

- Belarus: Kosovo

Belarus–Kosovo relations refer to the diplomatic and political interactions between Belarus and Kosovo. Belarus does not recognize Kosovo as an independent state, aligning with its broader foreign policy and historical ties with Serbia, a key opponent of Kosovo's independence. The relationship between Belarus and Kosovo is marked by the former's consistent support for Serbia in international forums and non-engagement with Kosovo's institutions. These dynamics reflect the geopolitical influences of Russia, Serbia, and other nations opposing Kosovo's sovereignty, as well as Belarus's position within international diplomacy.

== Bilateral relations ==
The interdependent interest of Belarus and Kosovo is based on the main principles of international relations such as sovereignty, territorial integrity, and international law. On the issue of recognition of Kosovo’s independence, Belarus has remained against, supporting Serbia as one of its key allies. The position that the Belarusian government maintains is supported by respect for such prerogatives as legal interpretations, political partnerships, and more generally by the stance against perceived Western encroachments in the post-Soviet space. Through analyzing historical references and legal/politically motivated reasons, Belarus’s stance on Kosovo is explained.

In February 2008, Belarusian President Alexander Lukashenko wrote in a letter to Serbian President Boris Tadić that "Belarus expresses its solidarity with the Serbians' intention to defend their sovereignty and territorial integrity". The National Assembly of Belarus had issued a statement condemning the declaration of independence and encouraged all nations to call the move "illegal" under international law.

== Belarus’s Stand on Kosovo Sovereignty ==
Belarus among other participants negated the existence of a general right to secession besides colonial scenarios or a special right to secession as a solution for grievances. They stated that the independence procedure is “illegal” under international law and called on other countries not to recognize Kosovo's sovereignty. This position aligns with Belarus’s general foreign policy course, emphasizing compliance with international law.

== Legal Bases of Pro-Authority Position of Belarus ==
The controversy surrounding Kosovo’s independence shows global contrasts, where nations like Belarus oppose both Nato’s 1999 intervention in Kosovo, citing it as a violation of international law, and the state’s independence. UN Security Council Resolution 1244 reaffirmed Serbia’s sovereignty, which Belarus uses to justify its stance. Belarus recognized and supported former Soviet States such as Lithuania, Latvia, and Estonia, which were internationally recognized and admitted to the UN. On the other hand, Belarus does not recognize Kosovo, claiming it fails to meet legal provisions for self-determination and sovereignty, infringing on Serbia’s sovereignty.

The Foreign Ministry of Belarus published a statement saying "that the settlement of the Kosovo and Metochia [sic] status should progress under international law, based on UN Security Council resolution 1244 (of 1999) which is a fundamental document for the Kosovo settlement certifying the sovereignty and territorial integrity of the Republic of Serbia, and based on the key provisions of the UN Charter and Helsinki Final Act, with the essential role of the UN Security Council bearing a predominant responsibility for safeguarding international peace and security".

In a 3 December 2009 hearing at the ICJ, the Belarusian delegation said that secession by international law was allowed only in former colonies, or in cases where the minority population was oppressed for a long period of time and was denied the participation in government, and that the situation in Kosovo had not met these criteria traditionally interpreted as the right for "external" self-determination. The delegation continued saying that the internal law of Serbia, as well as UNSC resolutions, were satisfactory for the "internal" self-determination of the Albanian population.

== Belarusian diplomacy relations ==
Through active diplomacy, Belarus has maintained strong ties with Serbia, including recent agreements on security forces. Belarus has consistently pursued a vigorous policy of non-recognition of Kosovo in international organizations and urged other states to follow international law on the matter. In May 2012, Uladzimir Chushaw, the Belarusian ambassador to Serbia, reiterated Belarus’s position, expressing strong support for Serbia.

== See also ==
- Foreign relations of Belarus
- Foreign relations of Kosovo
- Belarus–Serbia relations
