= Ukraine's reaction to the 2008 Kosovo declaration of independence =

Kosovo's declaration of independence from Serbia was enacted on 17 February 2008 by a unanimous vote of the Assembly of Kosovo. All 11 representatives of the Serb minority boycotted the proceedings. International reactions were mixed, and the global community continues to be divided on the issue of the recognition of Kosovo. Ukraine's reaction to Kosovo's declaration of independence was originally one of neutrality, but it became more strongly opposed to independence during the presidency of Pro-Russian Viktor Yanukovych. Currently, Ukraine officially retains a position of neutrality towards recognition of Kosovo as an independent state in order to maintain relations with Serbia.

== History ==
=== 2008–2022 ===
On 18 February 2008, the Ukrainian Ministry of Foreign Affairs stated that "The multilateral mechanisms, such as EU, OSCE, UN, should play an important role". On 22 February 2008, the Ukrainian Foreign Minister, Volodymyr Ohryzko, said that Ukraine was "checking all possibilities" on Kosovo recognition but cautioned that the process would "take some time." Ohryzko went on to say that he understood the US arguments very well, but was confident that they also understood the sensitivities of this issue for Ukraine. Ukrainian President Viktor Yushchenko stated on 19 February 2008 that Ukraine's position on the situation is to first of all follow national interests and international law. He emphasised that Ukraine's position proceeds from the opinion that the decision on recognising Kosovo or not requires timing for most of the world's countries. "We proceed from hope that resources of regulation through talks have not been yet exhausted." On 16 April 2008, the Office of Mass Media Relations of the Cabinet of Ministers of the Ukraine Secretariat issued the following statement on the Government Portal official website: "Ukraine will decide on its position concerning [the] independence of Kosovo after [a] corresponding assessment by international institutions". Ukrainian Prime Minister Yulia Tymoshenko furthermore stated that Ukraine lies in the neighbourhood of several countries facing territorial problems and "That's why before taking any decision, Ukraine wishes to know whether Kosovo is already a norm, a common practice or a unique event the world should react on". Tymoshenko noted that Ukraine is holding multilateral diplomatic consultations, with the aim of establishing how Kosovo independence is perceived, which will allow it to determine its stand in this issue. On 22 October 2008, Ukrainian Deputy Foreign Minister Kostyantyn Yeliseyev stated that Ukraine intends to maintain its neutral stance. "If Ukraine chooses any position, the security of our peacemakers will be put in question," he said. On 4 December 2008, speaking at the Organization for Security and Co-operation in Europe meeting about separatism that took place in 2008, Foreign Minister Volodymyr Ohryzko said that "Ukraine will never make a compromise on question of territorial integrity of any state".

In October 2009, Ukrainian Ambassador to Russia Kostyantyn Gryshchenko said that there are no cases in which Ukraine should recognise Kosovo, Abkhazia or South Ossetia.

On 4 June 2010, Ukrainian President Viktor Yanukovych said, "I have never recognized Abkhazia, South Ossetia or Kosovo's independence. This is a violation of international law". On 27 July 2010, Press Secretary of the Foreign Ministry of Ukraine Oleksandr Dikusarov said, "Ukraine's position not to recognize the independence of Kosovo remains unchanged: Relying on basic international legal documents… Ukraine is committed to the principle of absolute respect for the sovereignty and territorial integrity of all states with recognized international borders".

The 2018 FIFA World Cup qualification match between Ukraine and Kosovo was played in the Marshal Józef Piłsudski Stadium in Kraków, Poland on 9 October 2016, due to Ukraine's non-recognition of Kosovo's travel documents.

=== 2022–present ===
On 6 August 2022, a bill was proposed in the Verkhovna Rada by the opposition European Solidarity party which would recognise Kosovo as an independent state if passed. In April 2023, Ukraine abstained from voting on Kosovo's membership application to join the Council of Europe, while at the same time Serbia voted in favour of Ukraine's sovereignty before the United Nations months earlier.

== See also ==
- Kosovo–Ukraine relations
- Serbia–Ukraine relations
- Russia's reaction to the 2008 Kosovo declaration of independence
