= Eva Haljecka Petković =

Serbian gynecologist, activist

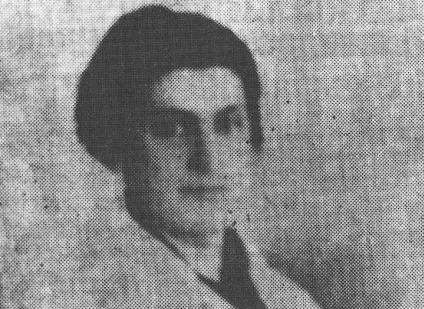
- Born: 1870; Congress Poland, Russian Empire
- Died: 1947 (aged 76–77)
- Occupations: Physician and women's rights activist

Eva Haljecka Petković (1870–1947) was a Serbian physician and an activist for the rights of women doctors. She was the first female gynecologist in the Balkans, the first head of the Department of Maternity and Women's Diseases in Niš, and the first woman who performed a caesarean section in Serbia.

== Early years and education ==
Eva Haljecka Petković was born in 1870, in a village of Congress Poland, at the border with the Russian Empire. Eva's mother died during her childbirth. Her father, Marko Haljecki, was a construction engineer. Due to the nature of his business, she often traveled with him and moved often.

Petković was educated by her father. She completed her primary school in Odessa, and her secondary school in Kiev, where her father worked. After finishing high school, she enrolled in medical school in 1886, studying in University of Bern, and then University of Zurich, where she graduated in 1891. She completed her specialization at the University of Vienna at the school's Gynecology and Obstetric Clinic in the class of Professor Friedrich Saout.

== Career ==
After completing her studies, she joined her father, who worked on the construction of a dock and the Danube coastline near Belgrade. She started her first job in January 1892, in Belgrade, by the decision of the Ministry of Internal Affairs of Serbia, as a medical assistant at the General State Hospital in Belgrade. In 1905, she got the job of a secondary doctor at the Gynecology-Babic Department of the General State Hospital, also by the decision of the Ministry of Internal Affairs of Serbia.

In 1909, Petković went to Niš where she was appointed as the Secondary Doctor of the Nis District Hospital. In Niš, she served as the head of the District Hospital during the Balkan Wars from 1912 to 1913. During the World War I, from 1915, she was a prisoner of the Bulgarian army during the occupation of Nis, but returned to her position in December 1918 through September 1919. Besides the work of a manager and a doctor, Petković also worked in cholera slums, where there were venereal, ocular and other patients, whom the Nis-English hospital did not want to receive at the time. After working as head of the District Hospital to the end of World War I, Eva became an assistant doctor at the Department of Maternity and Women's Diseases of the Nis District Hospital the same year. On 3 January 1920, by the decree of the Ministry, she became the head of the Department of the Niš District Hospital, and remained in office until 1924, when she retired. She was the first woman in the Balkans who performed a Caesarean section, in 1910, the first gynecologist in the Balkans, and the first head of the Department of Maternity and Female Diseases in Niš.

Petković was one of the most prominent fighters for equalizing the rights of women with the rights of men. In 1908, she sent an objection to National Assembly of Serbia. In her argument, she asked for the equalization of the rights of women doctors with the rights of men doctors—

"Let's go to women's doctors. The state asks us to have the exact same qualifications as our male counterparts. We women doctors in Serbia can only work as doctors' assistants in hospitals, with a salary of 125 dinars, from the start of our career to the grave. The state, however, used us, female doctors. They set us up and worked us even now as medical assistants, making the work more profitable, although through the long years, we realized that we were fully capable of independent work." —Eva Haljecka Petkovic

She devoted her lifetime to professional work and improvement of medicine, especially to the improvement of women's health. She was one of the most active members of the Serbian Medical Society in Belgrade and Nis. For her devotion and work in the field of medicine, she was honored with the Royal Order of the Holy Savior of the Fifth Order (1913); the Cross of Mercy, for caring for sick and wounded during and after the war (1914); and the Royal Order of the Holy Savior of the Fourth Order (1915). She died in 1947.

== See also ==
- Immigration to Serbia
