= Belarus–Serbia relations =

- Belarus: Serbia

Belarus and Serbia maintain diplomatic relations established between Belarus and the Federal Republic of Yugoslavia (of which Serbia is considered sole legal successor) in 1994.

== Political relations ==
Following the 2020 Belarusian presidential election, Serbia signed the Declaration initiated by the European Union rejecting the election results and criticizing the crackdown against those protesting.

Since 2013 Serbian businessman Dragomir Karić has been the honorary consul of Belarus in Belgrade.

In 2023, Belarusian filmmaker Andrey Gnyot was arrested when he landed in Belgrade as he was on an Interpol warrant list. He is accused by the Belarusian authorities of tax evasion and issued an extradition request. During the 2020–2021 Belarusian protests, Gnyot co-founded the Free Association of Athletes (SOS-BY), bringing together athletes opposed to the Lukashenko regime. He spent seven months in detention in Belgrade before being transferred to house arrest in June 2024. Amnesty International called on the Serbian authorities to cease the extradition process.

The contract-legal basis of cooperation of Belarus and Serbia includes 20 signed agreements which cover almost all areas of bilateral interests.

=== Belarus' stance on Kosovo ===
I know Serbia wonderfully. I was there more than once. I know the history and sentiments of the people of Serbia. After all, Serbia originated in Kosovo. In Kosovo, there are Serbian sacred sites.

— Alexander Lukashenko, Frankfurter Allgemeine Zeitung (2008)

== Economic relations ==
Belarus and Serbia signed a free trade agreement in 2009. Trade between the two countries amounted to $78 million in 2023; Serbia's merchandise exports to Belarus were about $39 million; Belarus' exports were roughly the same, standing at $38 million.

== Cultural cooperation ==
Serbian artists regularly take part in the Slavianski Bazaar in Vitebsk and have won several awards over the years.

== Travel regime ==
In 2000, Serbia and Belarus mutually abolished the requirement of obtaining an entry visa for its citizens for up to 180 days.

== Resident diplomatic missions ==
- Belarus has an embassy in Belgrade.
- Serbia has an embassy in Minsk.
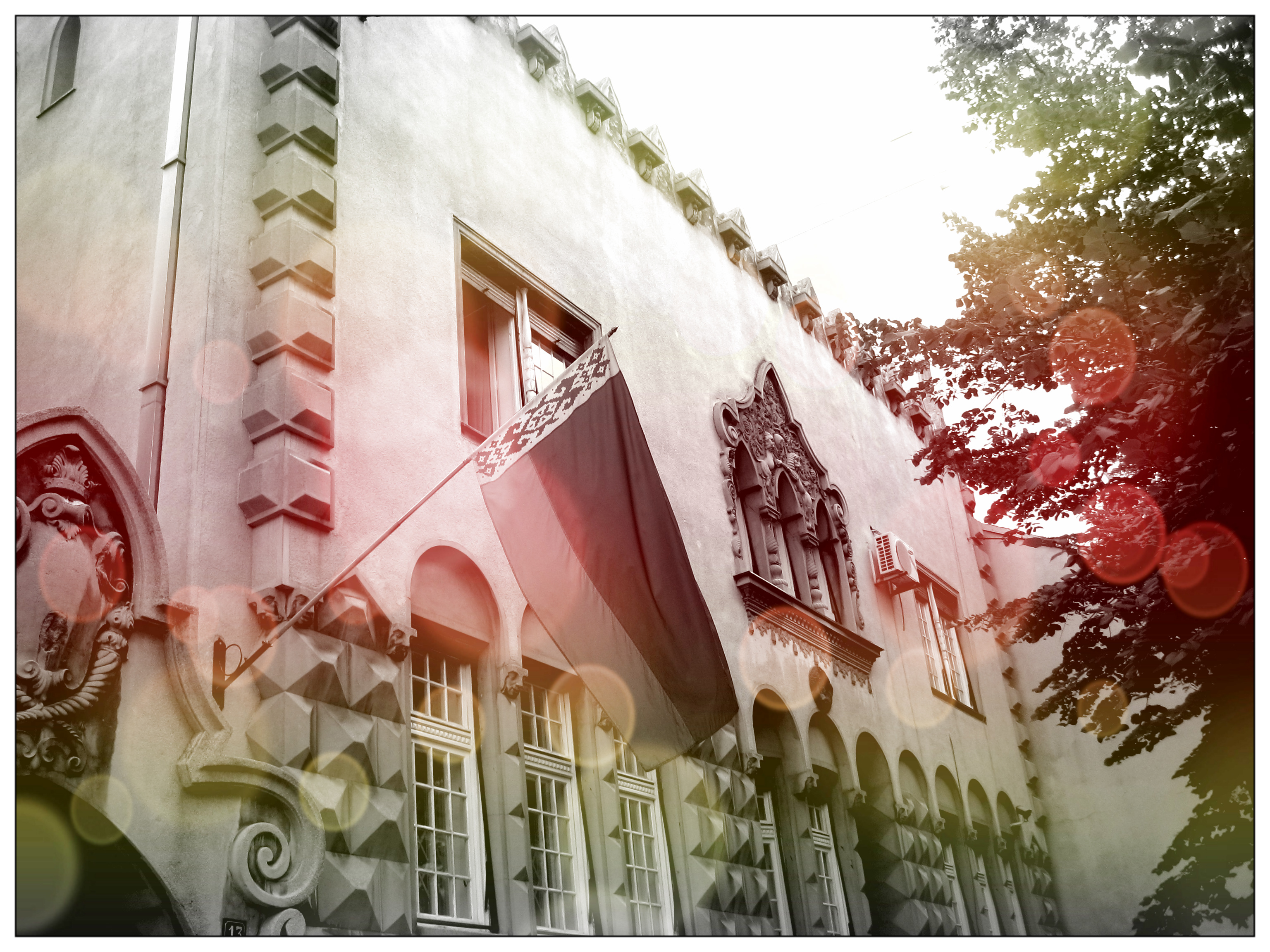
Embassy of Belarus in Belgrade

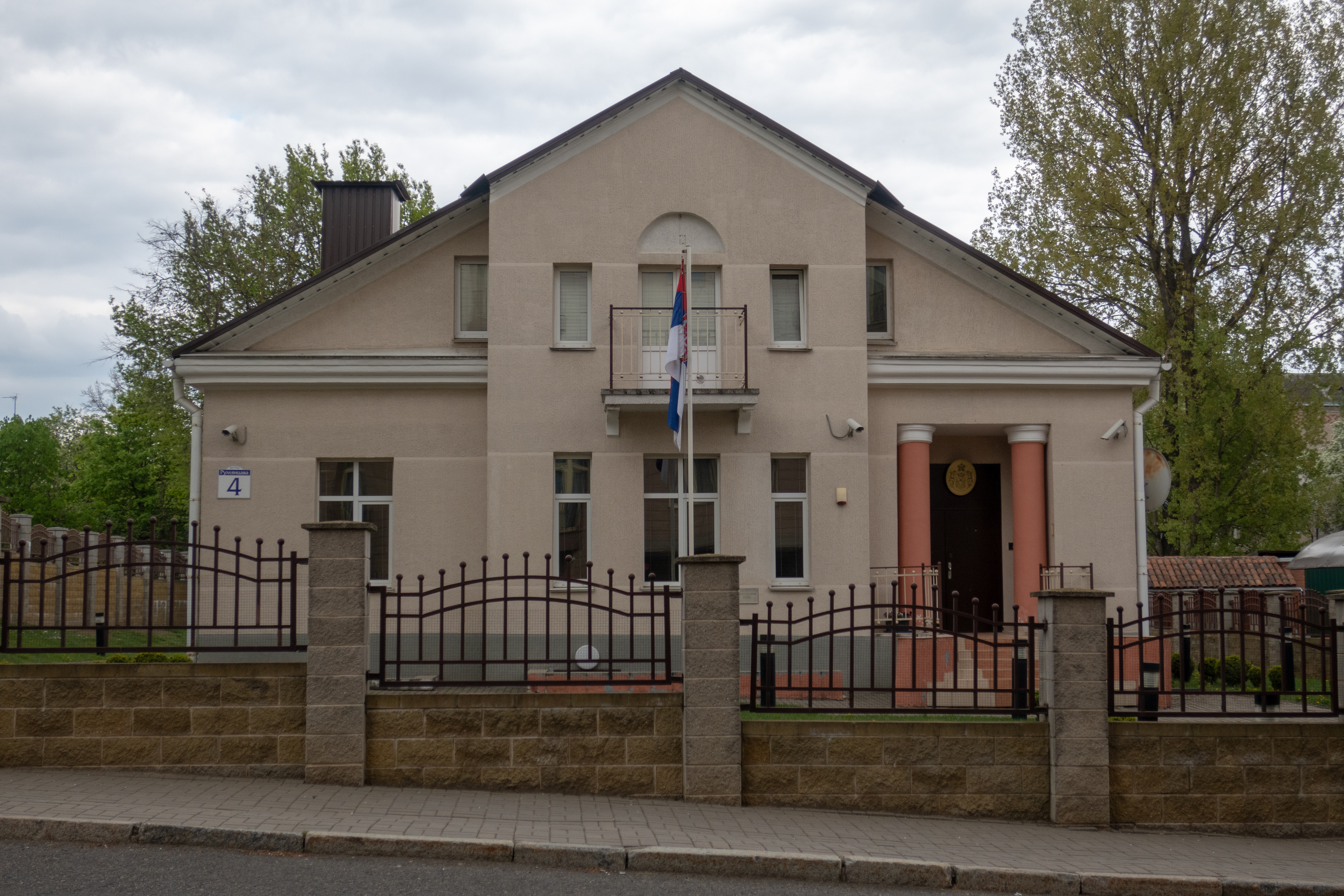
Embassy of Serbia in Minsk

== See also ==
- Foreign relations of Belarus
- Foreign relations of Serbia
- Soviet Union–Yugoslavia relations
- Belarusians in Serbia
- Serbs in Belarus
