= Ukrainian contingent in Kosovo =

Ukrainian contribution to the Kosovo Force

- Український контингент у Косові
- Active: 1999–2022
- Country: Ukraine
- Allegiance: Kosovo Force (KFOR)
- Branch: Armed Forces of Ukraine
- Size: 40 (August 2022)
- Garrison/HQ: Štrpce, Kosovo

The Ukrainian contingent in Kosovo (Ukrainian: Український контингент у Косові) was a Ukrainian military deployment, from September 1, 1999 to August 2022, as part of the NATO-led international peacekeeping force—Kosovo Force—which was responsible for establishing secure environment in Kosovo.

== History ==
=== Prerequisites ===
From March 24 to June 10, 1999, a NATO military operation took place on the territory of the Republic of Serbia and Kosovo, which aimed to end the Kosovo War and transfer the territory of Kosovo to the control of the UN. After a successful operation, KFOR (Kosovo Force) was created, whose task was to ensure stability in the region of Kosovo and Metohija.

=== Participation of Ukraine ===
==== Ukrainian-Polish Peace Force Battalion ====
On June 12, 1999, the Alliance decided to create a stabilization force in Kosovo.

On September 1, 1999, Ukraine began participating in the operation.

Having arrived in Kosovo, the 14th separate helicopter detachment of 66 people, the 37th separate special company of 108 people became part of the multinational task force "East" (Multinational Task Force "East") of the KFOR forces. The area of responsibility of the 37th company in Kosovo was the block post Draykovci in the municipality of Štrpce.

On July 10, 2000, a serviceman of the 37th separate company, junior sergeant Liubomyr Tovkan, died. In August 2000, the 37th company was replaced by the 208th separate special battalion (UkrPolbat).

After the Ministry of Defense of Ukraine created the Joint Operational Command of the Armed Forces of Ukraine, whose task was to manage the activities of Ukrainian military contingents outside Ukraine, the Ukrainian contingent in Kosovo was transferred to the command of the Armed Forces of Ukraine.

==== National contingent in Kosovo ====
At the beginning of March 2010, in connection with the reorganization of the KFOR forces, the Ukrainian component of the "UkrPolbat" battalion (180 servicemen) was withdrawn from the Polish-Ukrainian battalion and turned into an independent unit.

In August 2010, the Ukrainian contingent of 185 servicemen was reorganized and renamed the "National Contingent in Kosovo, Republic of Serbia".

In January 2014, one of the main tasks of the Ukrainian contingent in Kosovo was to protect the perimeter of the military base "GATE 1".

In 2015 and 2016, 40 servicemen as part of the KFOR contingent, two staff officers as part of UNMIK forces and 18 units of Ukrainian vehicles remained in Kosovo. The main task of the Ukrainian contingent was to participate in reconnaissance and demining of the area. Servicemen of the Ukrainian contingent in Kosovo were trained by German and Polish KFOR servicemen.

In December 2017, the rotation of the Ukrainian peacekeeping contingent within the KFOR mission took place. About forty Ukrainian servicemen who took part in the war in the east of Ukraine arrived in the republic to stand on combat duty.

In December 2020, another rotation of Ukrainian servicemen took place in Kosovo, which lasted six months. In January 2021, President Zelensky signed the Decree on sending to Kosovo national personnel from the ranks of the Armed Forces of Ukraine with a total number of up to 2 people.

In 2022, Kyiv announced that Ukrainian troops in Kosovo were recalled in response to the Russian invasion of Ukraine.
