= Immigration to Serbia =

Immigration to Serbia is less common than immigration to Western European or Southern European countries, but somewhat more common than to most of the other Southeastern European countries. According to the 2022 census, Serbia had 11.5% of the population foreign born (not counting Kosovo, which would put figure higher).

About two thirds of the foreign-born population consists of ethnic Serbs from neighbouring countries: the most common countries of birth were Bosnia and Herzegovina (32%), Croatia (25%), and Montenegro (8%). Many Bosnian Serbs and Croatian Serbs came to Serbia as refugees during the Yugoslav Wars in the 1990s.

One third of foreign-born population comes from elsewhere, primarily Russia, and to a lesser degree China. Since the start of the Russian invasion of Ukraine in 2022, more than 300,000 Russians have entered Serbia of which some 53,000 settled in the country i.e. had been issued a residence permit. After Russians, the most numerous immigrants in Serbia are Chinese, numbering about 14,500 of them in total. The Chinese are followed by Indian (4,574) and Turks (4,029).

== Notable immigrants ==
- Arkady Vyatchanin (born 1984), swimmer, from Russia
- Amjad Migati (born 1951), politician, from Jordan
- Arno Gujon (born 1985), humanitarian, from France
- Timothy John Byford (1941–2014), film director, from England
- George Ostrogorsky (1902–1976), historian, from Russia
- Francis Mackenzie (1833–1895), Protestant missionary, from Scotland
- Flora Sandes (1876–1956), nurse and soldier, from England
- Emil Hájek (1886–1974), pianist and composer, from Austria-Hungary
- Igor Youskevitch (1912–1994), dancer, from Russia
- Archibald Reiss (1875–1929), criminologist, from Germany
- Ignjat Bajloni (1811–1875), entrepreneur, from Bohemia
- Jakov Bajloni (1839–1902), merchant and industrialist, from Bohemia
- Dragutin Blažek (1847–1922), musician, from Bohemia
- Jovan Valenta (1826–1887), physician, from Prague
- Ipolit Monden (1811–1900), military, from France
- Velimir Valožić (1814–1887), publisher, from Bohemia
- Maria Fjodorovna Zibold (1849–1939), physician, from Russia
- Miloš Ekert (1890–1967), footballer, from Prague
- Alois Machek (1895–19xx), footballer, from Hradec Králové
- František Zach (1807–1892), military, from Moravia
- Bogoljub Jovanović (1839–1924), statistician, from Bohemia
- Jovan Mašin (1820–1884), physician, from Bohemia
- Eduard Mihel (1864–1915), physician, from Bohemia
- Jara Ribnikar (1912–2007), Partisan and writer
- Robert Tolinger (1859–1911), compositor, from Bohemia
- Mara Taborska (1879–1969), actress, from Bohemia
- Vladislav Titelbah (1847–1925), painter, from Bohemia
- Eva Haljecka Petković (1870–1947), physician, from Poland
- Aćim Medović (1815–1893), physician, from Galicia
- Nina Kirsanova (1898–1989), dancer, from Russia

== See also ==
- Visa policy of Serbia
