= Danilo Srdić =

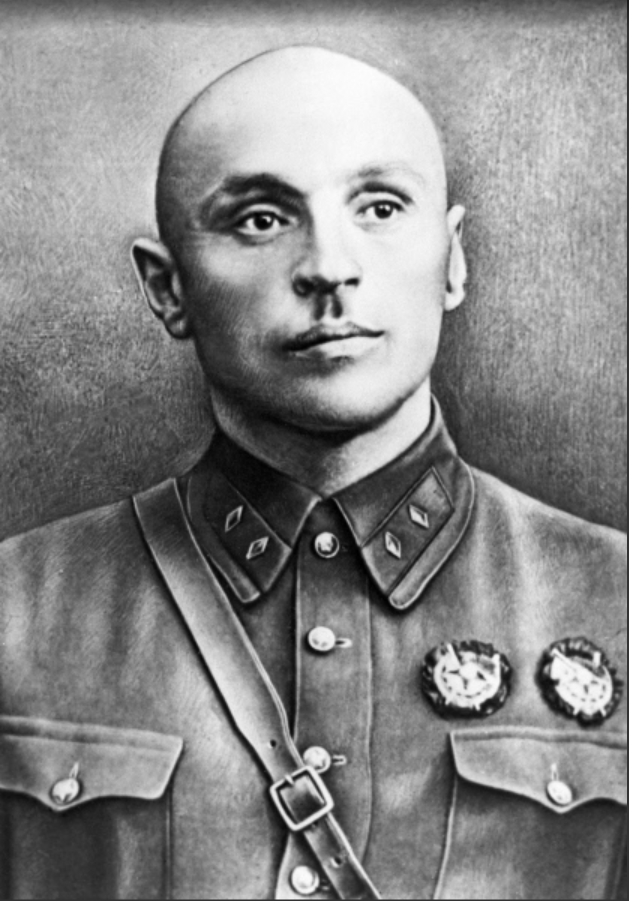
- Native name: Данило Срдић
- Born: 10 August 1896; Vrhovine, Austria-Hungary (now Croatia)
- Died: 28 July 1938 (aged 41) Moscow, Soviet Union
- Allegiance: Kingdom of Serbia; Russian SFSR; Soviet Union
- Branch: Red Army
- Service years: 1914–1937
- Rank: Komdiv
- Commands: 4th Rifle Corps; 3rd Cavalry Corps
- Conflicts: World War I Russian Civil War
- Awards: Order of the Red Bannerth

Danilo Srdić (Serbian: Данило Срдић, Russian: Даниил Фёдорович Сердич, Daniil Fyodorovich Serdich; 10 August 1896 – 28 July 1938) was a Serbian revolutionary and Soviet military leader who served as a division commander in the Red Army.

A veteran of World War I and the Russian Civil War, Srdić rose to high command in the Soviet military establishment.

== Biography ==
=== Early life ===
Danilo Srdić was born on 10 August 1896 in the village of Vrhovine (in the Lika region of present-day Croatia), at the time part of Austria-Hungary. Born into a Serbian peasant family, he completed his primary education and attended a railway vocational school for two years. He subsequently worked as a railway maintenance worker and at a soap factory. In 1912, seeking employment, he emigrated to the Russian Empire. He initially worked as a dock stevedore in Odessa, and later as a lathe operator at a factory in Yekaterinoslav (now Dnipro).

=== World War I ===
Following the outbreak of World War I, Srdić volunteered for the Imperial Russian Army. He served in the Grodno Life-Guards Cavalry Regiment. In 1916, he was transferred to the First Serbian Volunteer Division, a unit formed from Austro-Hungarian prisoners of war of Serbian, Slovenian, and Czech ethnicity.

In August 1916, the 1st Serbian Volunteer Division was deployed to the Balkan Front in Dobruja. Engaging Turkish and Bulgarian forces, the division suffered heavy casualties, losing half of its personnel, and was withdrawn to Russia. For his distinction in combat, Non-commissioned officer Srdić was awarded the Cross of St. George.

=== Revolution and Civil War ===
Following the February Revolution, Srdić became involved in revolutionary activities. He was arrested by the Russian Provisional Government for his participation in the July Days unrest of 1917 and was imprisoned in the Peter and Paul Fortress.

He was released in October 1917 and subsequently participated in the Storming of the Winter Palace. In 1918, he joined the All-Union Communist Party (Bolsheviks).

During 1918, Srdić commanded the 1st Serbian Revolutionary Detachment in Ukraine, fighting against German interventionist forces and the White Guard. The detachment eventually grew into a regiment.

After the disbandment of the 1st Yugoslav Revolutionary Regiment in 1919, Srdić was appointed commander of the Independent Cavalry Brigade of the 1st Cavalry Army. From October 1920, he commanded a cavalry brigade within the same army.

During the Perekop–Chongar operation, Srdić's brigade distinguished itself during the assault on the Chongar fortifications in Crimea, for which he was awarded the Order of the Red Banner. He received a second Order of the Red Banner in 1930.

=== Later service and death ===
Following the Civil War, Srdić held various command positions at the brigade, division, and corps levels. From 1932 to 1935, he commanded the 4th Rifle Corps, and from 1935 to 1937, he served as the commander of the 3rd Cavalry Corps in the Belorussian Military District. He was a member of the Central Committee of the Communist Party of Byelorussia and the CEC of the Byelorussian SSR from 1935 to 1937.

On 29 June 1937, Srdić was dismissed from military service. He was arrested by the NKVD on 15 July 1937. On 28 July 1938, the Military Collegium of the Supreme Court of the USSR found him guilty of participation in a "military-fascist conspiracy" and sentenced him to death. The sentence was carried out on the same day in Moscow.

Danilo Srdić was posthumously rehabilitated on 23 April 1957.

== Awards ==
- Order of the Red Banner (twice)
- Cross of St. George (4th class, Russian Empire)

== Personal life ==
Srdić was married to Antonina Savelyevna Serdich. Their son, Vyacheslav Serdich (1917–1944), volunteered for the Red Army following the invasion of the Soviet Union in World War II and was killed in action near Leningrad in 1944.

== Legacy ==
- A boulevard, a square, and a street in Minsk, Belarus, are named in his honor.
- A public transport stop in Minsk was named "Danila Serdich" by a decision of the Minsk City Executive Committee in 2025.

== See also ==
- Aleksa Dundić
