= Škarka Villa =

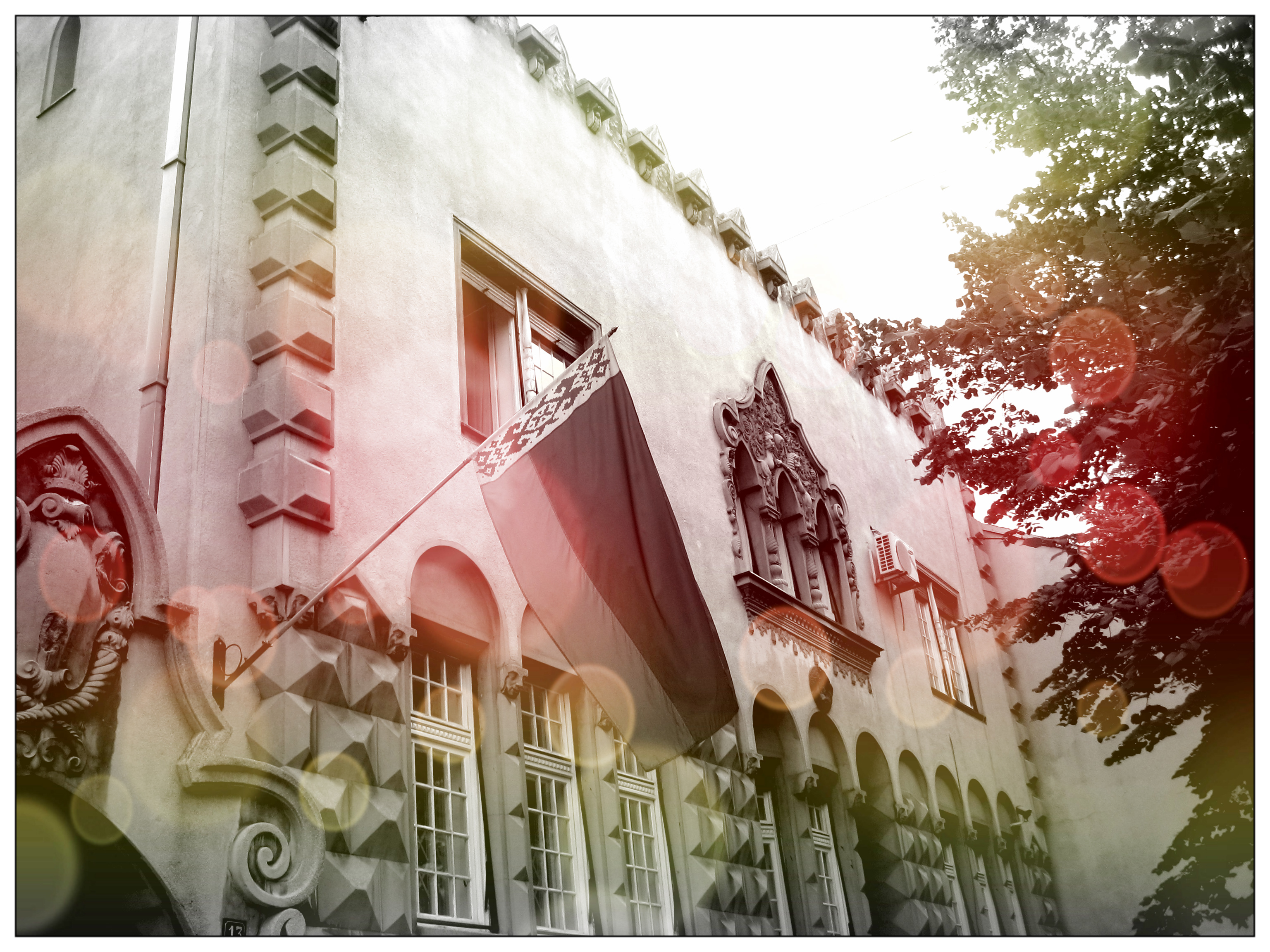
- Škarka Villa
- Interactive map of the Škarka Villa area

General information
- Type: Cultural monument
- Location: Savski venac, 13 Deligradska Street, Belgrade, Serbia
- Coordinates: 44.8010°N 20.4645°E
- Opening: 1927.

Škarka Villa is located at 13 Deligradska Street in Belgrade, Serbia, on Vračar slope, near Slavija Square.

== History ==
Rihard Škarka commissioned the architect Dragiša Brašovan to erect his house in Deligradska Street. Until then, Brašovan had already completed his independent work on the building of the former Eskontna banka in Nušićeva Street. The combined baroque-classicist eclectic style of this work had given Brašovan a level of fame in Belgrade.

Škarka Villa was built during 1926-1927 as a city villa. Academic principles, romantic spirit, historic motifs, tinges of modern ideas and art deco surface treatment are recognized in the design of the main street facade of the building. The facade is made in one plane, and the decorative elements which are taken from the historical styles - Romanic, Venetian Gothic and Baroque - contribute to its vividness. Strict academic division of the facade was abandoned, and the architect approached its layered processing in a creative way. The flat surface of the floor is in contrast to the rustic treatment of the lower part with gable motifs, diamond cubes very close to Czech Cubism, and windows completed with blind arcades. The floor is dominated by romantic trifora filled with floral, zoomorphic and anthropomorphic motifs, placed between modernist treated window openings without special emphasis. The façade ends with a decorative pronged roof attic. The motif of the pointed arch and Baroque volutas is repeated on the monumental entrance gate, whose doors are resolved in the form of a very decoratively treated metal grille.

Today, the Embassy of Belarus is located in this luxurious city mansion.

== Design ==
A modernist approach is revealed in the realisation of detail. Deviating from the academic principles, Brašovan separated the ornamental decoration into clearly determined continents, which made elements of modern architecture prominent. Opposed and at the same time unified broad-sided surfaces and ornament, arch and sharp angle, curved and straight line and motifs of different historical styles in a very modern arrangement make this façade of the most unusual façades and one of the most charming façades in Belgrade.

Unlike most of his contemporaries, Dragiša Brašovan also paid special attention to the less prominent facades, achieving the unity of the overall appearance of the building in morphological and stylistic terms. The well-equipped interior corresponds to the lush exterior finish. On the ceiling of the circular hall of the ground floor, a mural of an unknown artist is preserved to date.

== Recognition ==
In 1927, the facade of Škarka Villa received an award as one of the most beautiful facades in Belgrade.

Škarka Villa is a building of significant architectural and cultural-historical value. It is one of the most successful examples of Brašovan’s architecture of city villas, and as a rare building of romantic spirit, it occupies a special place in Belgrade interwar architecture.

As a building of significant architectural and cultural-historical value, Škarka Villa was declared a cultural monument in 2002 (Decision, Official Gazette of RS, no. 73/02).

== See more ==
- List of cultural monuments in Belgrade

== Literature ==
- K. Ćirić, Škarkina vila, Zavod za zaštitu spomenika kulture grada Beograda, Beograd 2011. * Dokumentacija ZZSKGB, SK-296 Z. Manević, Delo arhitekte Dragiše Brašovana, ZLU Matice srpske, br. 6, Novi Sad, 1970.
- A. Kadijević, Život i delo arhitekte Dragiše Brašovana (1887–1965), GGB, knj. XXXVII, Beograd, 1990.
- A. Ignjatović, Dve beogradske kuće arhitekte Dragiše Brašovana, Nasleđe, V, Beograd, 2004.
- Dosije spomenika kulture Škarkina vila, Zavod za zaštitu spomenika kulture grada Beograda
- Z. Manević, Delo arhitekte Dragiše Brašovana, ZLU Matice srpske, br. 6, Novi Sad, 1970.
