= Maria Fjodorovna Zibold =

Russian Empire and Serbian physician

Maria Fjodorovna Zibold, also known as Marie Siebold (1849–1939) was a Russo-Serbian physician. Born in Saint Petersburg, she studied in Zürich and Bern from 1870 to 1874 and qualified in 1874. She first obtained recognition as a surgeon in a military hospital in Serbia during the Russo-Turkish War and then practiced in Belgrade from 1878 to 1888. Exiled for safety reasons, she was active in Constantinople for 17 years, until a harem intrigue led to her expulsion. After unsuccessful practice in Belgrade, she was active in Egyptian hospitals from 1907. On the outbreak of war in 1914, she returned to Serbia and was imprisoned by the Bulgarians with a military hospital in Albania.
