= Stojan Bošković =

Serbian educator, politician, and historian

Stojan Bošković (1833 – 21 February 1908) was a Serbian educator, politician, and historian.

== Biography ==
Bošković was born in Svilajnac, at the time in the Principality of Serbia. He attended the Belgrade Gymnasium and then studied law and philosophy at the Belgrade Lyceum.

He began his career as a young professor and translator in 1853. He was the first to translate Eugène Sue's Le Juif errant (The Wandering Jew; 1845) which appeared in six consecutive segments (No. 12-17) in the weekly magazine Sedmica (Weekend) in Novi Sad in 1853. He worked at the Šabac Gymnasium, where he became its principal in 1857. One of his pupils was Stojan Novaković whom he encouraged to pursue his studies in Belgrade.

From Šabac Bošković moved to Belgrade where he first worked as a high school professor and then in 1859 and 1860 he was the editor of the official Serbian newspaper called Novine srbske, published by Dimitrije Davidović. Bošković was inclined towards liberalism and adhered to liberal political understandings and as a result, suffered persecution during the reign of Prince Mihailo Obrenović. He was transferred from the capital, was arrested and forced into exile for a while.

From 1868 to 1903, when he finally retired, he performed a number of significant political duties. He was Minister of Education in the cabinets of Ljubomir Kaljević (1875) and Jovan Ristić (1879) and a member of the State Council in 1890. He also served in the diplomatic service.

He taught General History at the Belgrade Velika škola in 1874 and 1877-1879 as professor and then in 1883-1887 as an honorary professor. Although state affairs often distracted him from his work at the Velika škola, his teaching and work as Minister of Education greatly raised the quality of teaching. Bošković was a member of the Serbian Learned Society or the Serbian Royal Academy.

He died in Belgrade, at the time in the Kingdom of Serbia.

His son, Matija Bošković (Mathias Boshkovitch) was a diplomat.

== Work ==
He was one of several historians in his day, along with Stojan Novaković, the leader of the Progressive Party; Čedomilj Mijatović, minister of foreign affairs and finance; and Ljubomir Jovanović, minister of education.

The early 1850s marked an appearance of the first generation of Serbs born in Serbia who was well-educated on state bursaries in order to train a local bureaucratic and intellectual elite to substitute the imported one from Habsburg or Serbian Vojvodina. It is from this group that the first self-defined liberals came -- Jevrem Grujić, Aleksa Janković, Vladimir Jovanović, and Stojan Bošković. As a member of this group of intellectuals, Bošković aspired to improve the government different from absolutism, modern in its principles and organization.

He wrote, "We must learn from England -- the mother of liberty and constitutionalism in the whole world."

Bošković advocated the introduction of state examinations for all civil servants and the improvement of the material status of professors by making their salaries equal to the salaries of other state officials.

Bošković wrote mainly textbooks and broad-based syntheses from general history but also did research work too. He published works in various fields of creative writing — journalism, fiction, political literature, and history. He published two volumes, 1866 and 1883, of the popularly read Istorije sveta za narod i skolu (History of the World for the People and the School) and Istorija sveta zaviše razrede srednjih škola sa slikama (History of the World for grades in the Middle Schools with illustrations). Of similar quality are the general history textbooks for upper secondary schools (1883), Slike iz vremena refomacije (Reformation paintings; 1877 and 1886), and Antikrist ili car neron (Antichrist or Emperor Nero; 1882), a detailed study of social and political circumstances in ancient Rome during the 1st century A.D. His shorter works, published in various periodicals, were often historically motivated. These writings were mostly published in scholastic work Za prosvetu i slobodu (For Education and Freedom; 1882). The only Serbian work in history was a study of Emperor Stefan Dušan written in French and published in Florence in 1866. Another book, La Mission du Peuple Serbe dans la question d'Orient considerations sur le passé et l'avenir des pays Balkaniques, also written in French by Bošković, was published in Brussels in 1886. Bošković often tried not to include his political ideas into his journalistic and historical works, so they are both a testimony to his time and a significant historiographical contribution as well.
