= Serbia–Ukraine relations =

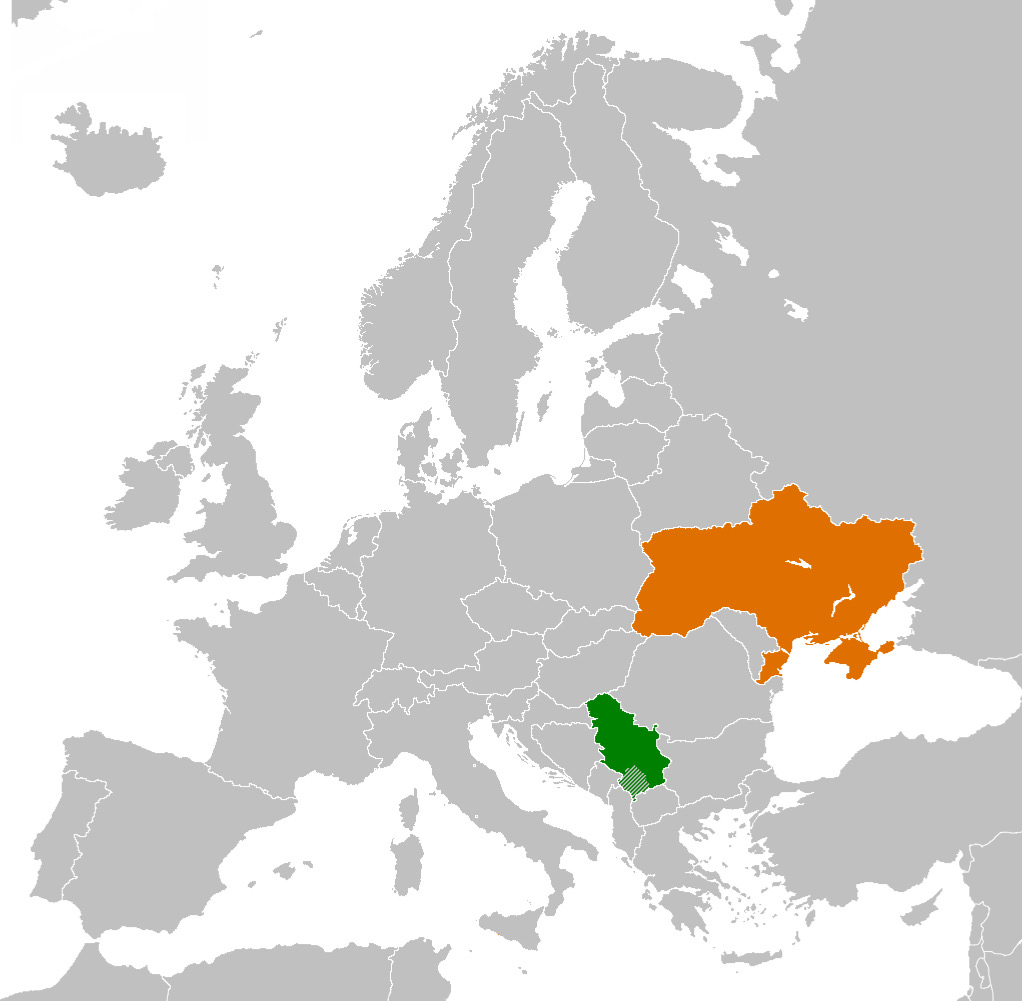
- Serbia: Ukraine

Serbia and Ukraine maintain diplomatic relations established between Ukraine and the Federal Republic of Yugoslavia (of which Serbia is considered sole legal successor) in 1994.

== History ==
In the 18th century on territory of today's Ukraine there were two provinces populated by Serbs - New Serbia and Slavo-Serbia. By the decree of the Senate of 1753, the free lands of this area were offered for settlement to peoples of Orthodox Christian denomination in order to ensure frontier protection and development of this part of Southern steppes. Slavo-Serbia was directly governed by Russia's Governing Senate. The settlers eventually formed the Bakhmut hussar regiment in 1764. Also in 1764, Slavo-Serbia was transformed into the Donets uyezd of Yekaterinoslav Governorate (now in Dnipropetrovsk Oblast). According to the 2001 census there were only 623 Serbs living in Ukraine (219 spoke Serbian, 104 spoke Ukrainian, 218 spoke Russian and 68 some other language).

== Political relations ==
Serbia and Ukraine have been active in bilateral meetings. In January 2001, President of Ukraine Leonid Kuchma paid a visit to Belgrade and met with the then President of the Federal Republic of Yugoslavia, Vojislav Koštunica. Prime Minister Dragiša Pešić, visited Ukraine in September 2001. President of Serbia and Montenegro Svetozar Marović, visited Ukraine in November 2003. Deputy Prime Minister of Serbia, Božidar Đelić, met with Oleksandr Turchynov, first deputy prime minister in Kyiv after the EBRD annual meeting where they have discussed future free trade agreement and situation in Kosovo. President of Ukraine Viktor Yushchenko visited Serbia in June 2009, during the XVI Summit of Heads of Central European States in Novi Sad.

Foreign Minister of Serbia, Goran Svilanović visited Ukraine in February 2002. Ukrainian Minister of Defense Yevhen Marchuk, visited Serbia in February 2004. Ukrainian Foreign Minister Kostyantyn Gryshchenko, visited Serbia in October 2004. In January 2005 Serbian Foreign minister Vuk Drašković, visited Ukraine on the occasion of the inauguration of President Viktor Yushchenko. Drašković visited Ukraine again in June 2005 and March 2006. Ukrainian Foreign minister Borys Tarasyuk visited Serbia in January 2006 and Arseniy Yatsenyuk visited Serbia in July 2007.

Zoran Šami, Speaker of the National Assembly, met Ukraine's Chairman of the Verkhovna Rada Volodymyr Lytvyn, during the session of the Parliamentary Assembly of the Organization of the Black Sea Economic Cooperation in Kyiv in June 2005.

Officials of Serbia and Ukraine have had important meetings in multilateral arenas as well. The most important was the meeting between Presidents Kuchma and Koštunica at the Earth Summit 2002 in Johannesburg.

PORA, a civic youth organization from Ukraine, was trained by members of the similar organization from Serbia - Otpor!. Otpor movement helped bring down the regime of Slobodan Milošević during 5th October and they trained Pora members in organizing Orange Revolution against the regime of Leonid Kuchma.

This is our brotherly nation, we have long common history, traditions and close relations with, both political, economic, and humanitarian.

— Ukrainian President Viktor Yushchenko, on relations with Serbia (June 2009).

Slavica Đukić Dejanović, Speaker of the National Assembly, met Ukraine's Chairman of the Verkhovna Rada Volodymyr Lytvyn in Kyiv in July 2010 signing a document on cooperation between the two parliaments.

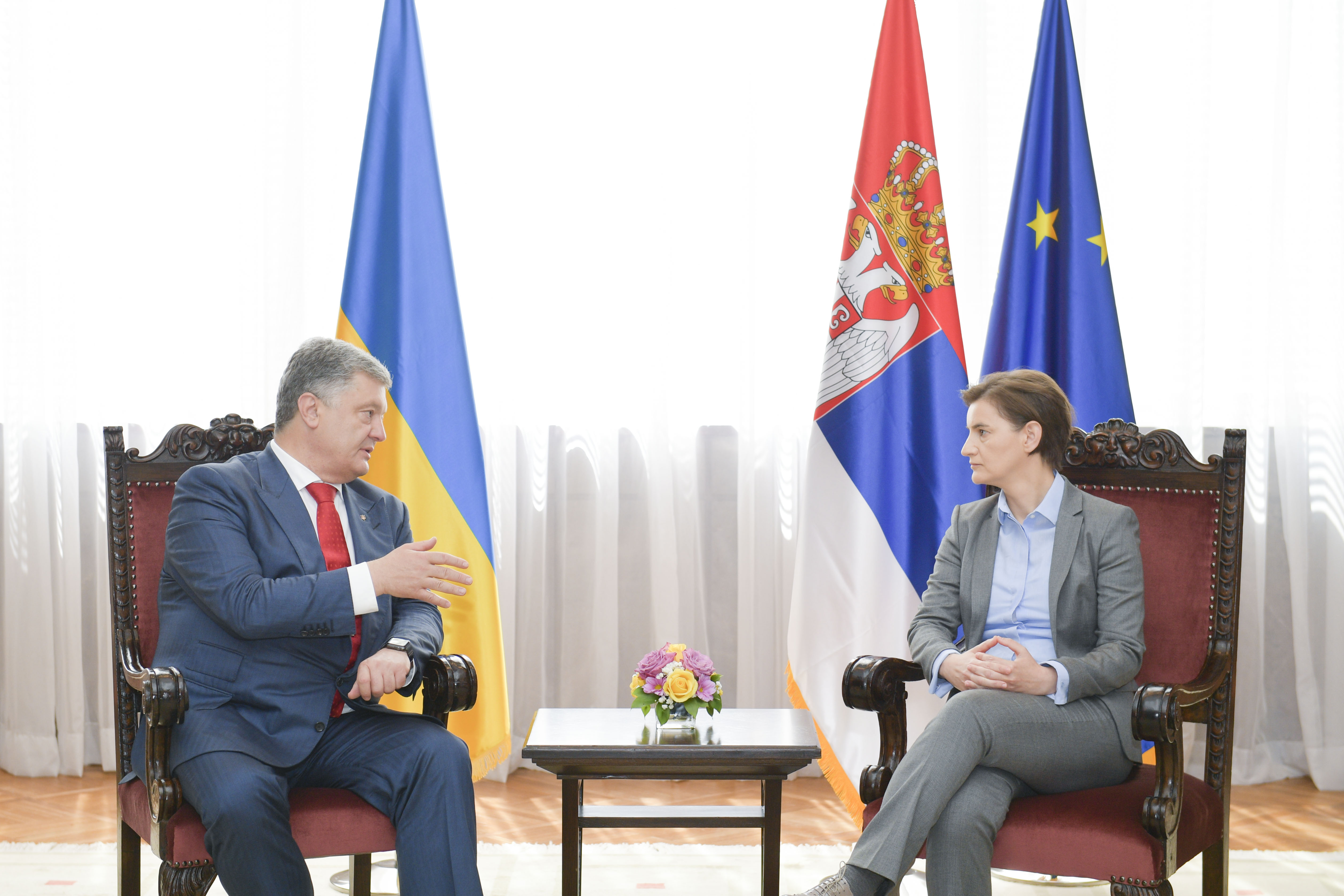
Ana Brnabić, Prime Minister of Serbia, and Petro Poroshenko, President of Ukraine, 2018

In April 2011, Ukraine's Chairman of the Verkhovna Rada Volodymyr Lytvyn visited Serbia.

In May 2011, Foreign Minister of Serbia Vuk Jeremić visited Ukraine and signed visa-free regime between the two countries.

In November 2011, Ukrainian Prime Minister Mykola Azarov visited Serbia for the Central European Initiative summit.

Serbian President Boris Tadić visited Ukraine in November 2011.

There is a spiritual and religious unity of the Serbian and the Ukrainian people.

— Serbian President Boris Tadić, on relations with Ukraine (November 2011).

In July 2018, Ukrainian President Petro Poroshenko met with Serbian President Aleksandar Vučić and Prime Minister Ana Brnabić in Belgrade.

In June 2025, Serbian President Aleksandar Vuĉić visited the Ukrainian city of Odesa for one day to attend the Ukraine-Southeastern Europe Summit making it his first ever visit to Ukraine as president.

In August 2026, Ukrainian President Volodymyr Zelenskyy visited Serbia and met President Aleksandar Vučić and Prime Minister Đuro Macut. The two sides signed a Memorandum of Understanding on agricultural cooperation, while Vučić announced plans for a new free trade agreement. Also were discussed in detail joint economic and logistics projects, the development of the Danube corridor and the strengthening of ties between Ukraine, the Western Balkans and the European Union and allocation of €2 million to support the Ukrainian energy sector and the restoration of one of the cities destroyed by Russian strikes.

=== Serbian stance on Russian invasion of Ukraine ===
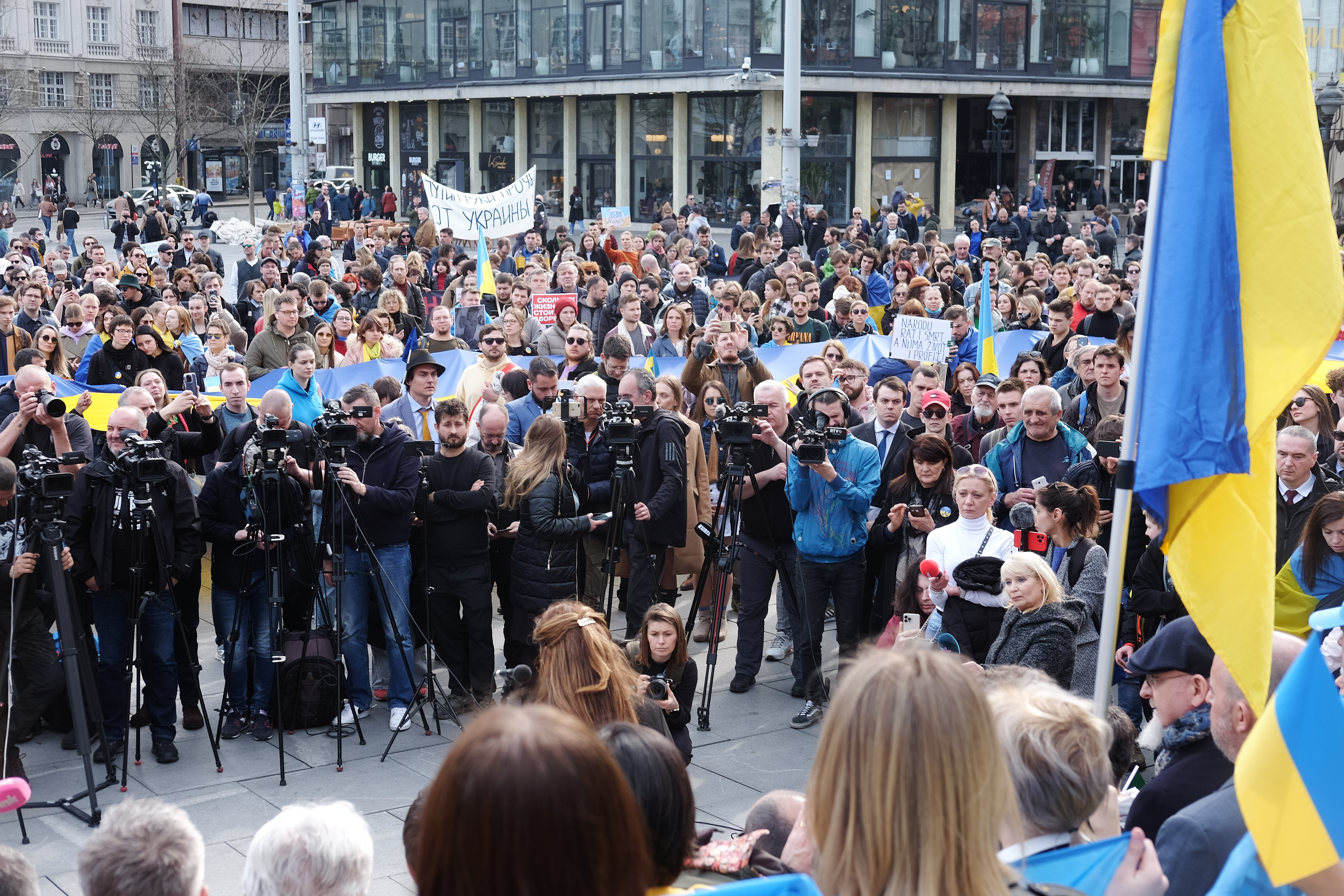
Protest in Belgrade against Russian invasion of Ukraine on the first anniversary of invasion, 2023

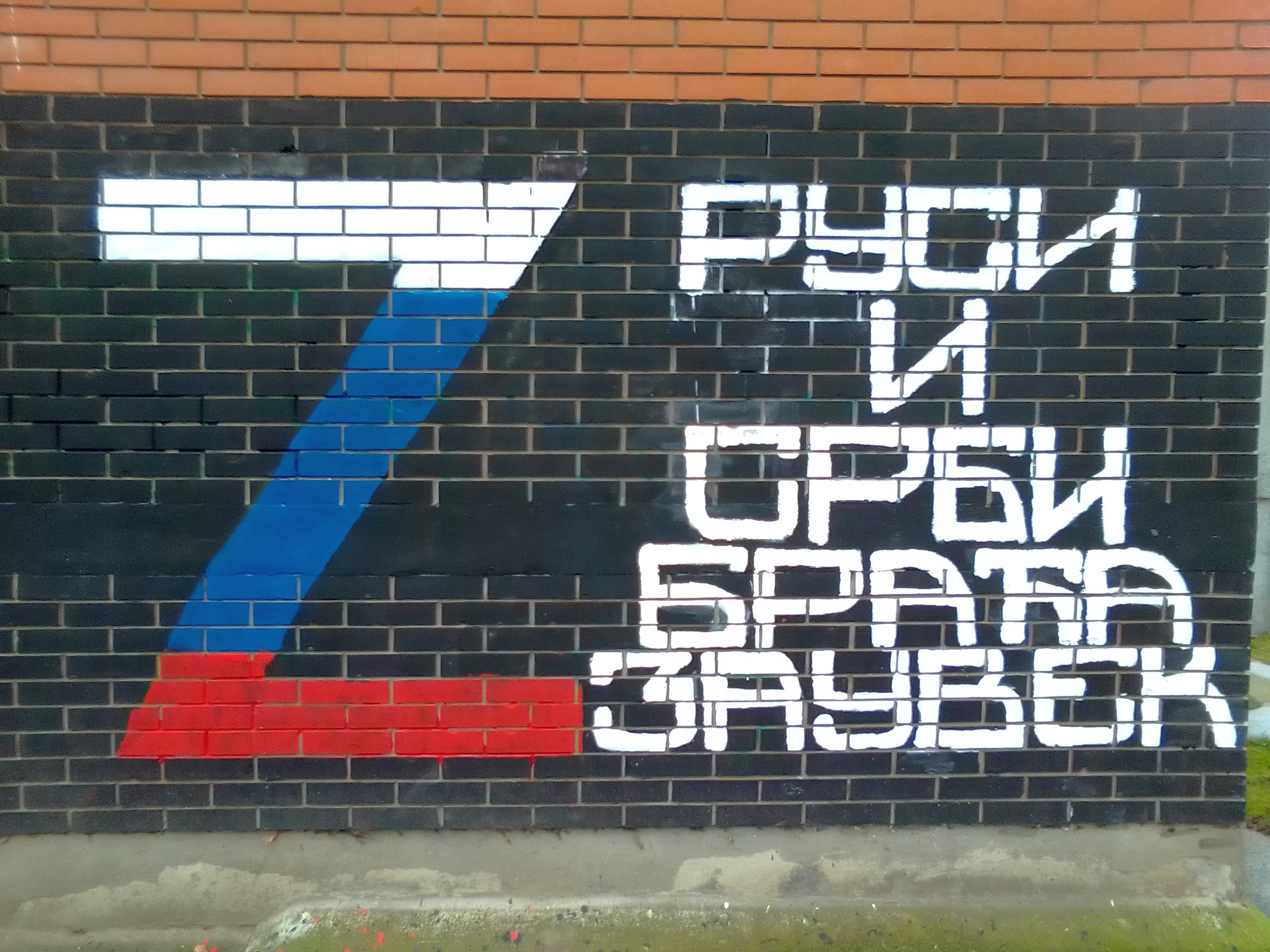
Mural in Belgrade in support of Russian invasion of Ukraine featuring the Z symbol

After the start of the Russian invasion of Ukraine in 2022, the Serbian government reaffirmed its respect for Ukraine's territorial integrity. Serbia voted in favour of UN General Assembly resolutions condemning Russia's illegal attempt to annex four regions of Ukraine. In May 2022, the Government of Serbia donated €3 million in aid to children and displaced persons from Ukraine.

Beginning in 2014, significant numbers of Serbian citizens (and ethnic Serbs from neighboring countries) took up arms to fight against Ukraine in the war in Donbas, which prompted the Serbian government to pass a law prohibiting its citizens from taking part in hostilities on foreign soil. In 2019 the Ukrainian Embassy in Serbia estimated that around 300 Serbian nationals were fighting in Ukraine, all of them on the Russian side. After the 2022 invasion, many more Serbian nationals took up arms to fight against Ukraine.

According to the BBC, Serbian public sentiment during the Russo-Ukrainian War has been decidedly pro-Russian, with over 70% of Serbian citizens supporting Russia over Ukraine. Several rallies in support of Ukraine were held in Belgrade. Rallies in support of Russia's invasion have been held as well and those were more attended than pro-Ukraine ones. Numerous murals and graffiti supporting Russia's invasion of Ukraine appeared throughout Belgrade following the invasion.

As a result of the 2022–2023 Pentagon document leaks, it was reported that the Serbian government had secretly agreed to supply arms and ammunition to Ukraine. The allegations were denied by Serbian officials at the time, but several months later, Serbian President Aleksandar Vučić told the Financial Times: "Is it possible that it’s happening? I have no doubts that it might happen. What is the alternative for us? Not to produce it? Not to sell it? [...] But I'm not a fool. I am aware that some of the arms might end up in Ukraine." At a multilateral summit meeting in February 2024, Ukrainian President Volodymyr Zelenskyy thanked Vučić for the humanitarian support the Serbian government had provided his country.

In May 2024, Ukrainian foreign minister Dmytro Kuleba and first lady Olena Zelenska visited Serbia and met with Serbian President Aleksandar Vučić. The Serbian Prime Minister's office issued a statement saying "Serbia is committed to respecting international law and the territorial integrity of every member state of the United Nations, including Ukraine."

=== Ukrainian stance on Kosovo ===
Ukraine does not recognize Kosovo as an independent state and has shown a respect to Serbia's territorial integrity. In 2008, after the Serbian province of Kosovo unilaterally declared independence as the Republic of Kosovo, Chairman of the Verkhovna Rada Committee for Foreign Affairs, Oleh Bilorus, stated that "Ukraine will back Serbia's stand on Kosovo". Prime Minister Yulia Tymoshenko said that Ukraine must come up with a concept of how to regard the issue of Kosovo, either as a unique phenomenon in the world, or in the context of existence of Transdniester, Abkhazia, South Ossetia and other separatist regions. In 2010, Ukrainian President Viktor Yanukovych stated that the recognition of the independence of Abkhazia, South Ossetia and Kosovo violates international law, "we have never recognized Abkhazia, South Ossetia or Kosovo's independence. This is a violation of international law".

== Economic relations ==
Ukraine and Serbia signed a free trade agreement in 2009. Trade between two countries amounted to $328 million in 2023; Serbia's merchandise export to Ukraine were about $150 million; Ukrainian exports were standing at roughly $178 million.

Ukrainian agritech company MHP owns a meat poultry plant in Bačka Topola.

== Military cooperation ==
Ukraine and Serbia signed a Treaty on Military Cooperation in 2003. Based on this treaty there were four meetings of working groups for enhancement of the cooperation. Priorities set by two sides are mutual army modernization, development and production of arms and military equipment, involvement of Serbian companies in decontamination of radioactive ammunition in Ukraine, joint operation in third markets, exchange of information, expert consultations and training of military staff.

On 29 May 2025, the head of Russia’s Foreign Intelligence Service has accused Serbia of supplying weapons to Ukraine via third countries like Czechia, Poland, and Bulgaria. Including “include hundreds of thousands of artillery shells and over a million rounds of ammunition”. The Serbian President, Aleksandar Vučić, denied the accusations, saying “we work only for Serbia”. However the Serbian President said: "But one more thing — our factories must stay alive and operate. About 24,000 people are directly employed in the defense industry, and they rely on it. Right now, we are directing weapons to supply our own army". The following day the Serbian Krušik ammunition factory exploded, wounding 8 workers and hospitalised another worker.

== Cultural cooperation ==
In 2004 a treaty of cooperation was signed between the State Committee of Archives of Ukraine and the State Archives of Serbia and in 2005 a treaty of cooperation the Vernadsky National Library of Ukraine and the National Library of Serbia. Serbia donated 5,000 laptops and tablets to Ukraine in 2024.

== Ukrainians in Serbia ==
Ukrainians in Serbia are a recognized ethnic minority group. Ukrainians in Serbia are closely related to Pannonian Rusyns. According to the 2022 census there were 3,969 ethnic Ukrainians in Serbia and 11,483 Rusyns, mostly living in Vojvodina.

== Resident diplomatic missions ==
- Serbia has an embassy in Kyiv.
- Ukraine has an embassy in Belgrade.
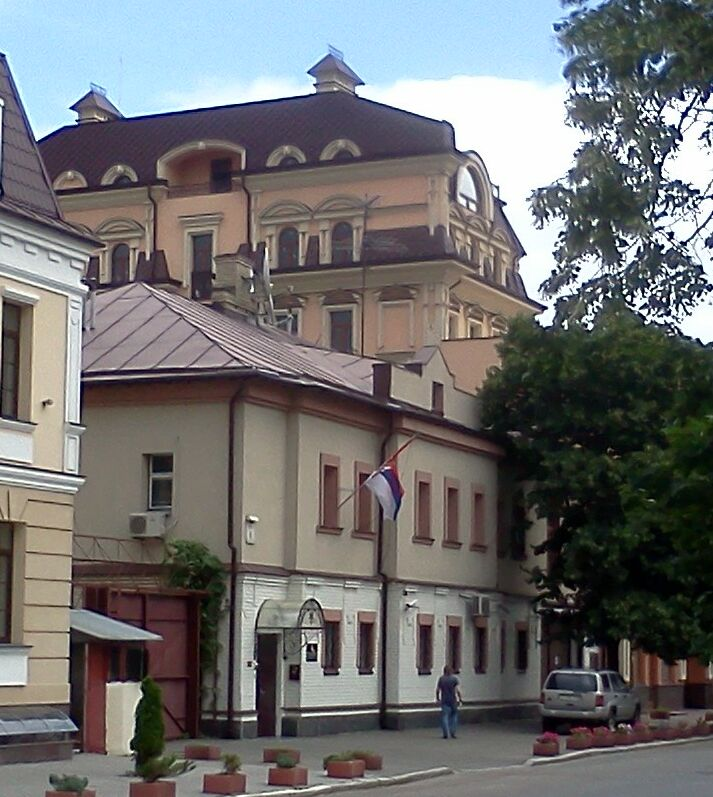
Embassy of Serbia in Kyiv

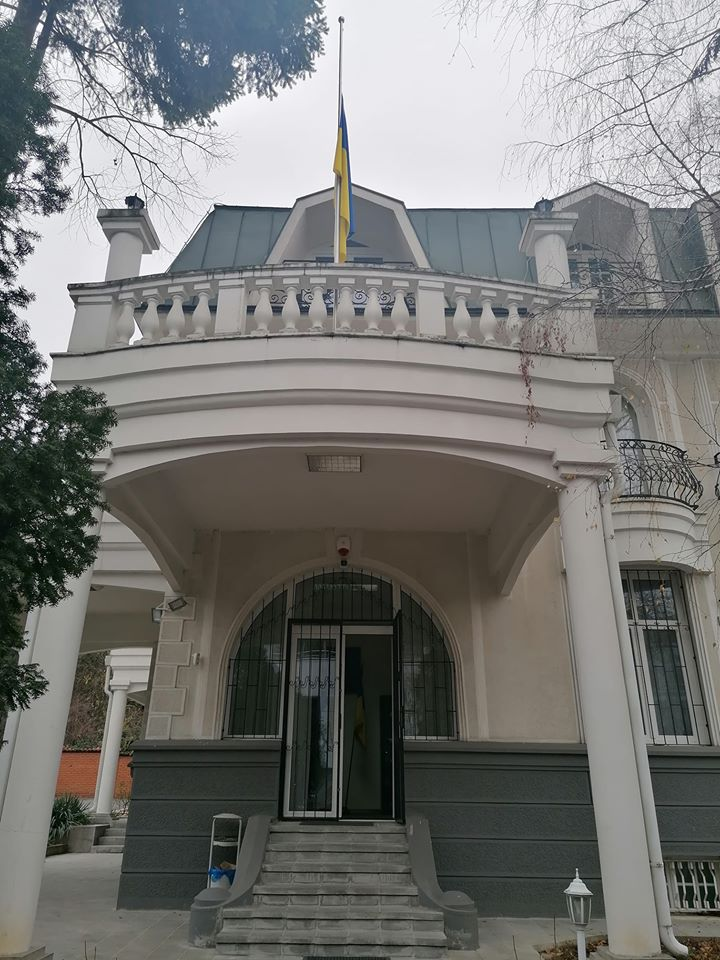
Embassy of Ukraine in Belgrade

== See also ==
- Foreign relations of Serbia
- Foreign relations of Ukraine
- Soviet Union–Yugoslavia relations
