= Demographics of Yugoslavia (disambiguation) =

Demographics of Yugoslavia may refer to:

- Demographics of Yugoslavia, from 1918 to 1992, including
  - Demographics of the Kingdom of Yugoslavia, from 1918 to 1945
  - Demographics of the Socialist Federal Republic of Yugoslavia, from 1945 to 1992
- Demographics of the Federal Republic of Yugoslavia (Serbia and Montenegro), from 1992 to 2006

== See also ==
- Yugoslavia (disambiguation)
- Yugoslav (disambiguation)
