= Demographics of Serbia =

Demographic characteristics of Serbia

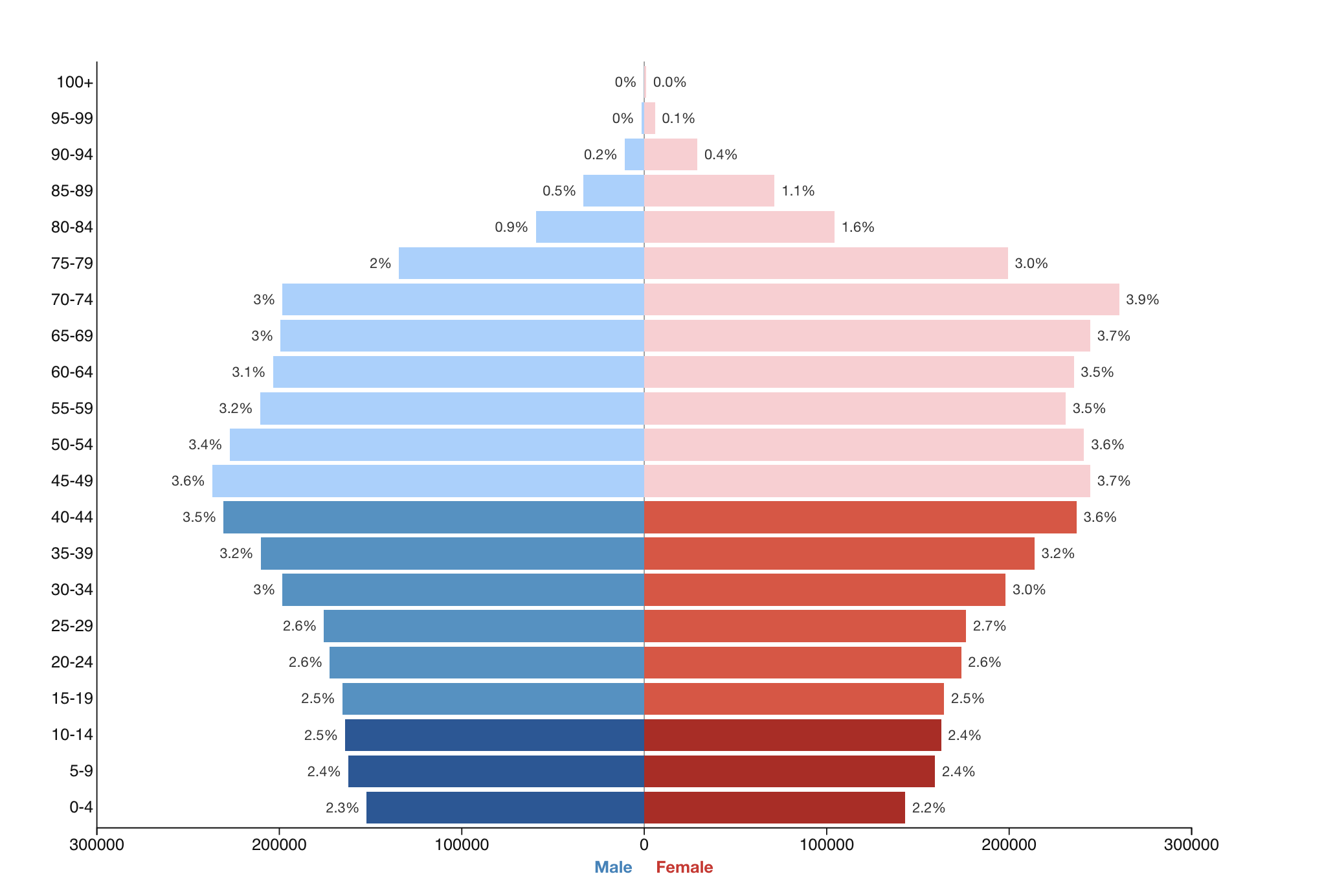
- Serbia population pyramid in 2026
- Population: ▼6,532,019 (2026)
- Growth rate: ▼ −5.5 per 1,000 inhabitants (2024)
- Birth rate: ▼9.2 per 1,000 pop. (2024)
- Death rate: ▲14.9 per 1,000 pop. (2024)
- Life expectancy: ▲75.4 years (2024)
  - male: 73.7 years
  - female: 78.3 years
- Fertility rate: ▲1.63 children born/woman (2024)
- Infant mortality: ▼4.6 deaths/1,000 infants (2024)
- Net migration rate: ▲0 migrant(s)/1,000 pop. (2024)
- Immigrant share: 10.6% (2024)

Age structure
- 0–14 years: ▼14.4% (2024)
- 15–64 years: ▼63% (2024)
- 65 and over: ▲22.6% (2024)

Sex ratio
- At birth: 1.06 male(s)/female
- Under 15: 1.06 male(s)/female
- 15–64 years: 1.00 male(s)/female
- 65 and over: 0.75 male(s)/female

Nationality
- Nationality: noun: Serbian(s) adjective: Serbian
- Major ethnic: Serbs (80.6%)
- Minor ethnic: Hungarians (2.7%); Bosniaks (2.3%); Roma (2%); Others (5.5%); Undeclared/Unknown (6.9%)

Language
- Official: Serbian at national level; Hungarian, Bosnian, Albanian, Slovak, Romanian, Croatian, Rusyn, Bulgarian, Macedonian, and Montenegrin, at local level (where share of respective ethnic minority in total population of city/municipality is more than 15%).
- Spoken: Serbian (84.3%); Hungarian (2.5%); Bosnian (2.2%); Romani (1.2%); Albanian (1%); Others (2.8%); Undeclared/Unknown (5.9%)

Demographic features of the population of Serbia include vital statistics; marriages and divorces; age structure and life expectancy; urbanisation; ethnic, religious, and linguistic statistics; migrations; education level of population.

The demography of Serbia is monitored by the Statistical Office of Serbia.

== Historical overview ==
Historical population
Year	Pop.	±% p.a.
1834	678,192	—
1841	828,895	+2.91%
1843	859,545	+1.83%
1846	915,080	+2.11%
1850	956,893	+1.12%
1854	998,919	+1.08%
1859	1,078,281	+1.54%
1863	1,108,568	+0.69%
1866	1,216,219	+3.14%
1874	1,669,337	+4.04%
1884	1,901,336	+1.31%
1890	2,161,961	+2.16%
1895	2,312,484	+1.36%
1900	2,492,882	+1.51%
1905	2,688,025	+1.52%
1910	2,922,058	+1.68%
1948	5,794,837	+1.82%
1953	6,162,321	+1.24%
1961	6,678,247	+1.01%
1971	7,202,915	+0.76%
1981	7,729,246	+0.71%
1991	7,822,795	+0.12%
2002	7,498,001	−0.38%
2011	7,233,619	−0.40%
2022	6,647,003	−0.77%

The demographic evolution of modern Serbia has been shaped by waves of migration, wars, economic pressures, and shifting fertility patterns, rather than mere numerical fluctuations.

Emerging as an autonomous principality and with population of around 678,000 by 1834, Serbia benefited from massive inflows of ethnic Serbs from neighbouring regions under Ottoman and Habsburg rule, seeking refuge and opportunities. Displaced by uprisings and seeking ethnic consolidation, tens of thousands of Serbs from areas like Herzegovina, Montenegro, Kosovo, and to a lesser degree from North Macedonia, migrated to Serbia fueling population growth. This immigration not only homogenized the demographic landscape of the country but was also instrumental in the consolidation of a Serbian national identity and supported Serbia's push toward independence in 1878, transforming it to an expanding kingdom.

Another main driver of Serbia's population increase in the late 19th century was a very high birth rate, which fueled natural increase as the primary engine of growth. Serbia experienced demographic transition characterized by high fertility rates hovering at 5.4 children per woman, among the highest in Europe and rivaling rural Eastern European countries such as Russia but far exceeding rates in Western and Southern Europe (e.g., France's fertility rate of 3). This reflected a pre-industrial agrarian economy where large families ensured labor for farming and inheritance in a patrilineal culture, unmitigated by urbanization or contraception. Coupled with declining but still high mortality rates (especially infant and child mortality), the net effect was substantial natural population growth and the natural surplus yielded growth of over 100,000 annually. Territorial gains amplified this: the 1878 expansions added around 300,000 people outright. Censuses from this period show steady increases: from about 1 million people in the mid-19th century towards 2.5 million by the end of the century.

Serbia's demographic losses during the World War I were among the most catastrophic of any country involved in the war, both in relative and absolute terms, and from those losses Serbia never fully recovered. In fact, country had the biggest casualty rate in World War I suffering 1.26 million casualties: 28% of its population, which also represented staggering 58% of its male population. World War I losses resulted in a generational imbalance that would have long-lasting effects on the nation's population structure. With half of the male reproductive age group killed, Serbia faced a long-lasting male demographic deficit, affecting marriage patterns, fertility, and labor. Even though fertility rates remained high in general, the lack of men led to fewer births, delaying population recovery. Serbia's population did not return to its pre-war numbers until well into the early 1930s, and even then, the demographic structure had been permanently altered.

Serbia suffered significant demographic losses during World War II as well, though these were different in character and scope compared to the catastrophic losses of World War I. While the World War I decimated country's military-age male population through combat and disease, World War II brought ethnic persecution, civil conflict, mass executions and reprisals, particularly targeting civilians. Tens of thousands of Serbs were killed in Nazi reprisals (in Kragujevac over 2,700 civilians were executed in one day, in Kraljevo, around 2,000 were killed in a similar reprisal), often under the infamous policy of killing 100 civilians for every German soldier killed. Many more died in a civil conflict between two resistance movements communist Partisans and royalist Chetniks. Jews in Serbia were almost entirely exterminated by the Nazis by 1942.

The post-World War II the displacement of ethnic Germans and colonization of Serbs in Vojvodina represent one of the most significant demographic transformations in the history of modern Serbia. This period marked a radical change in the ethnic composition of Vojvodina, a historically multiethnic region in northern Serbia.

Before the World War II, ethnic Germans were one of the largest ethnic groups in Vojvodina, numbering 318,000. During the war they joined German military units in significant numbers and were later seen as collaborators with the Nazi occupiers and held collectively responsible for Nazi wartime atrocities against civilian population. As German forces retreated at the end of the war, approximately half of ethnic German population fled westward, abandoning homes and farms. Of the roughly 170,000 who remained in Vojvodina, reprisals were swift and brutal: Yugoslav Partisans, exacting vengeance for collaboration and war crimes, interned most of them in labor camps, where starvation, disease, and forced labor claimed almost 50 thousdand lives. Additional tolls included 10 thousand executed by Yugoslav Partisans and Soviet Red Army, yielding a revised total death count of about 60,000. By 1948, when camps were dismantled and citizenship revoked, the ethnic German population had plummeted to 41,460; most survivors emigrated to West Germany and Austria, before further exodus reduced their numbers to a mere 14,533 by the time of the 1961 Census.

Parallel to this, the Yugoslav government launched colonization program to repopulate confiscated German properties. Between 1945 and 1948, more than 200,000 settlers, predominantly Serbs from impoverished rural regions of Croatia (Lika, Kordun, Banovina) and Bosnia and Herzegovina (Bosanska Krajina and Herzegovina), were incentivized with land grants, tax exemptions, and housing. This influx shifted ethnic balances: Serbs, who comprised a third of Vojvodina's pre-war population, surged to an absolute majority by the 1950s.

Post-war Serbia saw a period of relative demographic stability, but this was soon complicated by mass labour emigration in the late 1960s, and throughout 1970s and 1980s. This period saw the Gastarbeiter phenomenon, where hundreds of thousands of Serbians, primarily from country's rural areas, emigrated as "guest workers" to Western Europe (primarily West Germany, Austria, and Switzerland) driven by unemployment and bilateral labour agreements between Yugoslavia and respective countries. This outflow, often involving less-educated rural populations, contributed to rural depopulation and exacerbated urban-rural divide, foreshadowing future emigration waves.

The 1990s were marked by the breakup of Yugoslavia and subsequent wars as well as economic collapse caused by the international sanctions against Serbia, that led to a dual demographic shock: mass emigration of young people fleeing economic turmoil and political instability, and a significant inflow of ethnic Serb refugees from Croatia, Bosnia and Herzegovina, and later Kosovo. This net influx temporarily stabilized numbers, preventing steeper decline despite low birth rates below replacement levels since the 1970s.

In recent decades, Serbia has faced acute depopulation driven by high mortality and persistently low fertility (hovering around 1.5 children per woman). Annual net migration losses of about 12,000, compound natural decrease, with the population dropping from 7.5 million in 2002 to 6.6 million in 2022.

View source data.
View source data.
View source data.
View source data.

== Vital statistics ==
=== 1880–1887 ===
	Average population	Live births	Deaths	Natural change	Crude birth rate (per 1000)	Crude death rate (per 1000)	Total fertility rate
1880	1,738,000	70,167	54,243	15,924	40.8	31.2	5.45
1881	1,775,000	80,678	43,645	37,033	46.0	24.6	5.45
1882	1,814,000	80,274	41,648	38,626	44.8	23.0	5.44
1883	1,859,000	87,161	42,263	44,898	47.5	22.7	5.44
1884	1,902,000	90,441	47,552	42,889	48.1	25.0	5.43
1885	1,940,000	90,627	52,318	38,309	47.4	27.0	5.43
1886	1,965,000	83,091	58,525	24,566	43.0	29.7	5.42
1887	2,008,000	93,911	50,481	43,430	47.5	25.1	5.42

=== 1900–1912 ===
	Average population	Live births	Deaths	Natural change	Crude birth rate (per 1000)	Crude death rate (per 1000)	Total fertility rate
1900	2,470,000	105,000	58,000	47,000	42.4	23.5	5.68
1901	2,520,000	96,000	53,000	43,000	38.0	21.0	5.54
1902	2,570,000	98,000	57,000	41,000	38.0	22.3	5.41
1903	2,580,000	106,000	60,000	46,000	40.9	23.5	5.13
1904	2,650,000	106,000	56,000	50,000	39.8	21.1	5.00
1905	2,660,000	100,000	65,000	35,000	37.3	24.8	5.04
1906	2,690,000	113,000	66,000	47,000	42.0	24.5	5.09
1907	2,770,000	111,000	62,000	49,000	40.0	22.4	5.13
1908	2,820,000	104,000	67,000	37,000	36.8	23.7	5.18
1909	2,840,000	110,000	83,000	27,000	38.7	29.3	5.23
1910	2,870,000	112,000	64,000	48,000	39.0	22.4	5.18
1911	2,940,000	107,000	64,000	43,000	36.3	21.8	5.14
1912	2,980,000	114,000	63,000	51,000	38.3	21.1	5.10

=== 1950–2025 ===
	Average population	Live births	Deaths	Natural change	Crude birth rate (per 1000)	Crude death rate (per 1000)	Natural change (per 1000)	Crude migration change (per 1000)	Total fertility rate	Female fertile population (15–49 years)
1950	5,969,977	163,297	76,851	86,446	27.4	12.9	14.5		3.11	1,667,489
1951	6,045,982	145,197	80,034	65,163	24.0	13.2	10.8	1.9	2.70	1,679,515
1952	6,106,976	161,306	67,870	93,436	26.4	11.1	15.3	-5.2	2.94	1,691,530
1953	6,186,015	151,672	68,168	83,504	24.5	11.0	13.5	-0.6	2.69	1,703,548
1954	6,271,014	152,569	62,610	89,959	24.3	10.0	14.3	-0.6	2.66	1,714,614
1955	6,369,436	140,396	65,179	75,217	22.0	10.2	11.8	3.9	2.42	1,725,685
1956	6,422,999	132,078	67,105	64,973	20.6	10.4	10.1	-1.7	2.26	1,736,751
1957	6,481,984	118,535	61,885	56,650	18.3	9.5	8.7	0.5	2.03	1,739,485
1958	6,535,020	118,425	55,564	62,861	18.1	8.5	9.6	-1.4	2.05	1,742,115
1959	6,587,014	114,872	60,850	54,022	17.4	9.2	8.2	-0.2	2.02	1,739,287
1960	6,638,992	119,298	61,872	57,426	18.0	9.3	8.6	-0.7	2.12	1,733,296
1961	6,689,077	115,222	57,990	57,232	17.2	8.7	8.6	-1.1	2.08	1,727,303
1962	6,740,264	110,008	62,830	47,178	16.3	9.3	7.0	0.7	2.03	1,735,235
1963	6,787,950	108,324	57,778	50,546	16.0	8.5	7.4	-0.3	2.02	1,750,899
1964	6,832,855	103,847	62,100	41,747	15.2	9.1	6.1	0.5	1.96	1,769,796
1965	6,876,624	106,699	58,856	47,843	15.5	8.6	7.0	-0.6	2.02	1,807,362
1966	6,927,969	103,775	55,471	48,304	15.0	8.0	7.0	0.5	1.98	1,843,693
1967	6,966,522	103,491	62,915	40,576	14.9	9.0	5.8	-0.2	1.96	1,887,344
1968	7,007,586	103,621	60,932	42,689	14.8	8.7	6.1	-0.2	1.95	1,945,878
1969	7,123,249	105,478	68,152	37,326	14.8	9.6	5.2	11.3	1.93	1,972,004
1970	7,164,993	102,453	67,211	35,242	14.3	9.4	4.9	1.0	1.81	2,012,702
1971	7,211,716	104,070	65,872	38,198	14.4	9.1	5.3	1.2	1.83	2,020,324
1972	7,267,030	106,859	70,822	36,037	14.7	9.7	5.0	2.7	1.83	2,019,717
1973	7,322,344	108,361	67,152	41,209	14.8	9.2	5.6	2.0	1.84	2,036,056
1974	7,377,659	110,458	66,457	44,001	15.0	9.0	6.0	1.6	1.86	2,020,513
1975	7,432,973	112,945	69,590	43,355	15.2	9.4	5.8	1.7	1.88	2,010,021
1976	7,488,287	114,035	68,565	45,470	15.2	9.2	6.1	1.3	1.89	2,002,713
1977	7,543,601	111,510	68,924	42,586	14.8	9.1	5.6	1.8	1.86	1,994,191
1978	7,598,916	110,622	71,986	38,636	14.6	9.5	5.1	2.2	1.86	1,974,022
1979	7,654,230	109,953	72,306	37,647	14.4	9.4	4.9	2.4	1.87	1,986,006
1980	7,709,544	109,597	76,180	33,417	14.2	9.9	4.3	2.9	1.86	1,997,988
1981	7,736,787	103,407	78,086	25,321	13.4	10.1	3.3	0.2	1.76	1,977,061
1982	7,763,335	106,575	78,473	28,102	13.7	10.1	3.6	-0.2	1.84	1,947,609
1983	7,788,100	108,003	83,506	24,497	13.9	10.7	3.1	0.1	1.89	1,914,434
1984	7,813,549	107,036	82,742	24,294	13.7	10.6	3.1	0.2	1.90	1,921,422
1985	7,835,902	101,938	81,836	20,102	13.0	10.4	2.6	0.3	1.84	1,920,627
1986	7,853,824	99,419	83,977	15,442	12.7	10.7	2.0	0.3	1.82	1,911,361
1987	7,868,027	98,279	83,426	14,853	12.5	10.6	1.9	-0.1	1.82	1,919,612
1988	7,884,218	97,471	83,616	13,855	12.4	10.6	1.8	0.3	1.82	1,899,146
1989	7,893,787	91,270	85,256	6,014	11.6	10.8	0.8	0.4	1.72	1,895,541
1990	7,897,937	90,467	85,515	4,952	11.5	10.8	0.6	-0.1	1.72	1,899,883
1991	7,824,589	90,378	89,072	1,306	11.6	11.4	0.2	-9.5	1.82	1,813,520
1992	7,787,897	86,877	93,475	-6,598	11.2	12.0	-0.8	-3.9	1.76	1,821,688
1993	7,751,205	87,931	95,121	-7,190	11.3	12.3	-0.9	-3.8	1.78	1,833,456
1994	7,714,513	85,292	93,011	-7,719	11.1	12.1	-1.0	-3.7	1.72	1,846,610
1995	7,677,821	86,236	93,933	-7,697	11.2	12.2	-1.0	-3.8	1.74	1,860,970
1996	7,641,129	82,548	98,370	-15,822	10.8	12.9	-2.1	-2.7	1.66	1,868,882
1997	7,604,437	79,716	98,068	-18,352	10.5	12.9	-2.4	-2.4	1.61	1,864,628
1998	7,567,745	76,330	99,376	-23,046	10.1	13.1	-3.0	-1.8	1.54	1,855,228
1999	7,540,401	72,222	101,444	-29,222	9.6	13.5	-3.9	0.3	1.46	1,844,875
2000	7,516,346	73,764	104,042	-30,278	9.8	13.8	-4.0	0.8	1.48	1,831,994
2001	7,503,433	78,435	99,008	-20,573	10.5	13.2	-2.7	1.0	1.58	1,821,493
2002	7,500,031	78,101	102,785	-24,684	10.4	13.7	-3.3	2.8	1.57	1,810,526
2003	7,480,591	79,025	103,946	-24,921	10.6	13.9	-3.3	0.7	1.59	1,789,668
2004	7,463,157	78,186	104,320	-26,134	10.5	14.0	-3.5	1.2	1.57	1,770,053
2005	7,440,769	72,180	106,771	-34,591	9.7	14.3	-4.6	1.6	1.45	1,750,845
2006	7,411,569	70,997	102,884	-31,887	9.6	13.9	-4.3	0.4	1.43	1,733,316
2007	7,381,579	68,102	102,805	-34,703	9.2	13.9	-4.7	0.7	1.38	1,718,428
2008	7,350,222	69,083	102,711	-33,628	9.4	14.0	-4.6	0.4	1.41	1,704,735
2009	7,320,807	70,299	104,000	-33,701	9.6	14.2	-4.6	0.6	1.44	1,691,363
2010	7,291,436	68,304	103,211	-34,907	9.4	14.2	-4.8	0.8	1.41	1,677,562
2011	7,236,519	65,598	102,935	-37,337	9.1	14.2	-5.2	-2.4	1.40	1,632,708
2012	7,184,513	67,257	102,400	-35,143	9.4	14.3	-4.9	-2.3	1.46	1,612,518
2013	7,132,506	65,554	100,300	-34,746	9.2	14.1	-4.9	-2.4	1.45	1,592,328
2014	7,080,500	66,461	101,247	-34,786	9.4	14.3	-4.9	-2.4	1.49	1,572,138
2015	7,028,494	65,657	103,678	-38,021	9.3	14.8	-5.4	-2.0	1.50	1,551,948
2016	6,976,487	64,734	100,834	-36,100	9.3	14.5	-5.2	-2.3	1.50	1,531,758
2017	6,924,481	64,894	103,722	-38,828	9.4	15.0	-5.6	-1.9	1.53	1,511,569
2018	6,872,474	63,975	101,655	-37,680	9.3	14.8	-5.5	-2.1	1.54	1,491,379
2019	6,820,468	64,399	101,458	-37,059	9.4	14.9	-5.4	-2.2	1.58	1,471,189
2020	6,768,462	61,692	116,850	-55,158	9.1	17.3	-8.1	0.5	1.54	1,450,999
2021	6,716,455	62,180	136,622	-74,442	9.3	20.3	-11.1	3.3	1.59	1,430,809
2022	6,664,449	62,700	109,203	-46,503	9.4	16.4	-7.0	-0.8	1.63	1,410,619
2023	6,623,183	61,052	97,081	-36,029	9.2	14.7	-5.4	-0.8	1.61	1,394,001
2024	6,586,476	60,845	98,230	-37,385	9.2	14.9	-5.7	0.1	1.63	1,377,141
2025	6,549,901	59,483	95,247	-35,764	9.1	14.5	-5.4		1.62	1,360,048
Note: data shown in the table are for Serbia excluding Kosovo.

=== Current vital statistics ===
Period	Live births	Deaths	Natural increase
January-September 2025	43,216	70,159	–26,943
January-September 2026	43,300	70,073	–26,770
Difference	▲ +84 (+0.2%)	▼-86 (-0.1%)	▲ +173
Note: data shown in the table are for Serbia excluding Kosovo.

=== Vital statistics by district ===
	Population	Live births	Deaths	Natural change	Crude birth rate (per 1000)	Crude death rate (per 1000)	Natural change (per 1000)	Total fertility rate
Belgrade	1,682,720	17,331	21,606	-4,275	10.3	12.8	-2.5	1.58
Bor	98,269	709	1,861	-1,152	7.2	18.9	-11.7	1.59
Braničevo	153,112	1,134	2,792	-1,658	7.4	18.2	-10.8	1.51
Central Banat	155,233	1,346	2,758	-1,412	8.7	17.8	-9.1	1.76
Kolubara	152,214	1,256	2,418	-1,162	8.3	15.9	-7.6	1.63
Jablanica	181,025	1,619	3,047	-1,428	8.9	16.8	-7.9	1.67
Mačva	261,380	2,293	3,989	-1,696	8.8	15.3	-6.5	1.71
Moravica	186,637	1,631	2,927	-1,296	8.7	15.7	-7	1.75
Nišava	340,930	3,302	5,327	-2,025	9.7	15.6	-5.9	1.66
North Bačka	157,929	1,320	2,768	-1,448	8.4	17.5	-9.2	1.59
North Banat	115,656	948	2,197	-1,249	8.2	19.0	-10.8	1.66
Pčinja	191,259	1,548	2,318	-770	8.1	12.1	-4.0	1.32
Pirot	74,951	536	1,383	-847	7.2	18.5	-11.3	1.55
Podunavlje	173,031	1,503	2,798	-1,295	8.7	16.2	-7.5	1.65
Pomoravlje	178,286	1,342	3,289	-1,947	7.5	18.4	-10.9	1.48
Rasina	203,341	1,529	3,333	-1,804	7.5	16.4	-8.9	1.51
Raška	296,390	3,304	3,510	-206	11.1	11.8	-0.7	1.88
South Bačka	607,403	6,376	7,845	-1,469	10.5	12.9	-2.4	1.62
South Banat	257,271	2,345	4,127	-1,782	9.1	16.0	-6.9	1.73
Srem	280,297	2,520	4,265	-1,745	9.0	15.2	-6.2	1.74
Šumadija	267,198	2,451	3,827	-1,376	9.2	14.3	-5.1	1.66
Toplica	76,003	795	1,327	-532	10.5	17.5	-7.0	2.01
West Bačka	151,228	1,145	2,850	-1,705	7.6	18.8	-11.3	1.57
Zaječar	94,036	584	2,020	-1,436	6.2	21.5	-15.3	1.41
Zlatibor	250,677	1,978	3,648	-1,670	7.9	14.6	-6.7	1.58
Note: data shown in the table are for 2024.

== Marriages and divorces ==
	Average population	Marriages	Divorces	Crude marriage rate (per 1000)	Crude divorce rate (per 1000)	Divorces per 1000 marriages
1950	5,969,977	76,749	9,623	12.9	1.6	125.4
1951	6,045,982	66,849	8,250	11.1	1.4	123.4
1952	6,106,976	67,255	5,611	11.0	0.9	83.4
1953	6,186,015	63,667	7,570	10.3	1.2	118.9
1954	6,271,014	61,707	8,053	9.8	1.3	130.5
1955	6,369,436	57,970	9,784	9.1	1.5	168.8
1956	6,422,999	55,603	9,291	8.7	1.4	167.1
1957	6,481,984	56,214	9,827	8.7	1.5	174.8
1958	6,535,020	63,195	10,229	9.7	1.6	161.9
1959	6,587,014	59,361	10,328	9.0	1.6	174.0
1960	6,638,992	62,341	10,585	9.4	1.6	169.8
1961	6,689,077	62,775	10,130	9.4	1.5	161.4
1962	6,740,264	58,211	9,948	8.6	1.5	170.9
1963	6,787,950	57,316	10,285	8.4	1.5	179.4
1964	6,832,855	59,481	9,977	8.7	1.5	167.7
1965	6,876,624	62,011	9,939	9.0	1.4	160.3
1966	6,927,969	60,878	10,731	8.8	1.5	176.3
1967	6,966,522	64,168	9,791	9.2	1.4	152.6
1968	7,007,586	64,287	10,179	9.2	1.5	158.3
1969	7,123,249	64,796	8,788	9.1	1.2	135.6
1970	7,164,993	66,719	9,129	9.3	1.3	136.8
1971	7,211,716	66,839	9,873	9.3	1.4	147.7
1972	7,267,030	68,417	10,335	9.4	1.4	151.1
1973	7,322,344	66,845	10,290	9.1	1.4	153.9
1974	7,377,659	65,790	11,086	8.9	1.5	168.5
1975	7,432,973	62,843	10,693	8.5	1.4	170.2
1976	7,488,287	61,555	10,917	8.2	1.5	177.4
1977	7,543,601	62,733	10,350	8.3	1.4	165.0
1978	7,598,916	61,943	10,813	8.2	1.4	174.6
1979	7,654,230	60,828	10,265	7.9	1.3	168.8
1980	7,709,544	57,500	10,840	7.5	1.4	188.5
1981	7,736,787	57,563	9,517	7.4	1.2	165.3
1982	7,763,335	57,327	10,236	7.4	1.3	178.6
1983	7,788,100	56,556	9,699	7.3	1.2	171.5
1984	7,813,549	55,482	10,349	7.1	1.3	186.5
1985	7,835,902	53,252	11,567	6.8	1.5	217.2
1986	7,853,824	52,383	10,348	6.7	1.3	197.5
1987	7,868,027	52,500	11,689	6.7	1.5	222.6
1988	7,884,218	51,709	11,686	6.6	1.5	226.0
1989	7,893,787	51,073	11,449	6.5	1.5	224.2
1990	7,897,937	48,261	9,889	6.1	1.3	204.9
1991	7,824,589	45,145	8,018	5.8	1.0	177.6
1992	7,787,897	46,155	6,501	5.9	0.8	140.9
1993	7,751,205	44,800	6,792	5.8	0.9	151.6
1994	7,714,513	44,091	6,358	5.7	0.8	144.2
1995	7,677,821	43,555	7,217	5.7	0.9	165.7
1996	7,641,129	40,705	6,860	5.3	0.9	168.5
1997	7,604,437	40,344	6,982	5.3	0.9	173.1
1998	7,567,745	39,328	6,909	5.2	0.9	175.7
1999	7,540,401	37,256	6,264	4.9	0.8	168.1
2000	7,516,346	42,586	7,689	5.7	1.0	180.6
2001	7,503,433	41,406	7,835	5.5	1.0	189.2
2002	7,500,031	41,947	9,982	5.6	1.3	238.0
2003	7,480,591	41,914	7,938	5.6	1.1	189.4
2004	7,463,157	42,030	8,845	5.6	1.2	210.4
2005	7,440,769	38,846	7,661	5.2	1.0	197.2
2006	7,411,569	39,756	8,204	5.4	1.1	206.4
2007	7,381,579	41,083	8,622	5.6	1.2	209.9
2008	7,350,222	38,285	8,502	5.2	1.2	222.1
2009	7,320,807	36,853	8,472	5.0	1.2	229.9
2010	7,291,436	35,815	6,644	4.9	0.9	185.5
2011	7,236,519	35,808	8,251	4.9	1.1	230.4
2012	7,201,497	34,639	7,372	4.8	1.0	212.8
2013	7,166,552	36,209	8,170	5.1	1.1	225.6
2014	7,131,787	36,429	7,614	5.1	1.1	209.0
2015	7,095,383	36,949	9,381	5.2	1.3	253.9
2016	7,058,322	35,921	9,046	5.1	1.3	251.8
2017	7,020,858	36,047	9,262	5.1	1.3	256.9
2018	6,982,604	36,321	9,995	5.2	1.4	275.2
2019	6,945,235	35,570	10,899	5.1	1.6	306.4
2020	6,899,126	23,599	8,687	3.4	1.3	368.1
2021	6,834,326	32,757	9,790	4.8	1.4	298.9
2022	6,664,449	32,821	9,813	4.9	1.5	299.0
2023	6,623,183	31,670	10,175	4.8	1.4	321.3
2024	6,586,476	30,376	10,611	4.6	1.6	349.3
Note: data shown in the table are for Serbia excluding Kosovo.

Median age of the groom at the time of marriage
31.9 years (2024)
Median age of the bride at the time of marriage
29.2 years (2024)

Median age of the husband at the time of divorce
45.5 years (2024)
Median age of the wife at the time of divorce
41.9 years (2024)

== Median age, age structure, and life expectancy ==
=== Median age ===
Serbia has a comparatively old overall population (among the 30 oldest in the world), with the median age of 44 years (42.4 for males and 45.4 for females).

=== Age structure ===
	Population	Share
0–4	308,771	4.7%
5–9	320,680	4.9%
10–14	321,669	4.9%
15–19	330,698	5.0%
20–24	340,609	5.2%
25–29	356,402	5.4%
30–34	388,679	5.9%
35–39	432,772	5.6%
40–44	467,926	7.1%
45–49	478,897	7.3%
50–54	454,627	6.9%
55–59	441,315	6.7%
60–64	455,813	6.9%
65-69	467,510	7.1%
70-74	451,639	6.8%
75-79	281,356	4.3%
80-84	165,324	2.5%
85+	121,789	1.8%
Age group	Population	Share
0–14	951,120	14.4%
15–64	4,129,045	63.0%
65+	1,487,618	22.6%

=== Life expectancy ===
The life expectancy in Serbia at birth is 75.4 years, 73.7 for males and 78.3 for females.

	Life expectancy
1950–1954	59.1
1955–1959	▲61.6
1960–1964	▲64.2
1965–1969	▲66.7
1970–1974	▲68.5
1975–1979	▲69.5
1980–1984	▲70.2
1985–1989	▲71.1
1990–1994	▲71.7
1995–1999	▲71.9
2000–2004	▲72.3
2005–2009	▲73.3
2010–2014	▲74.6
2015–2019	▲75.8
2020–2024	▼75.3

== Urbanisation ==
Share of Serbia's population living in areas classified as urban stood at 62.1% as of 2024.

Belgrade is disproportionately larger than any other city in the country, standing as an example of primate city, being four times larger than the second-largest city, Novi Sad. Consequently, the level of metropolisation (share of the country's total population living in the largest city) in Serbia is comparatively high, standing at 19.4%, i.e. almost one-fifth of the population lives in Belgrade urban area alone.

=== Largest urban areas ===
City	Population
Belgrade	1,298,661 (Note: Population of the contiguous urban area including adjacent settlements of Borča, Kaluđerica, and Surčin.)
Novi Sad	325,551 (Note: Population of the contiguous urban area including adjacent settlements of Petrovaradin, Sremska Kamenica, Veternik, and Futog.)
Niš	178,976
Kragujevac	146,315
Subotica	88,752
Pančevo	73,401
Novi Pazar	71,462
Čačak	69,598
Zrenjanin	67,129
Smederevo	59,261

== Ethnic groups ==
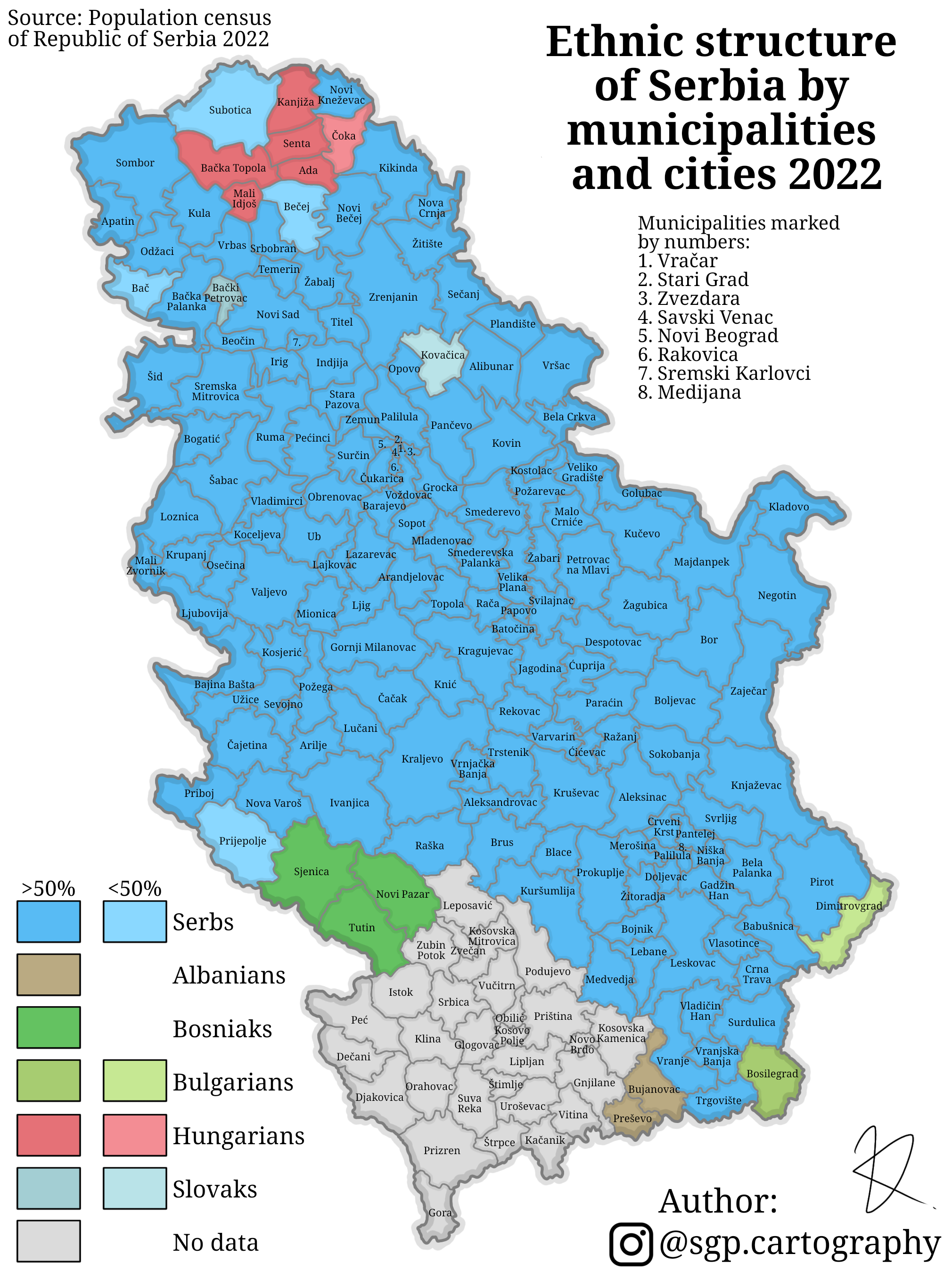
Ethnic map of Serbia

1. Serbs (80.6%)
2. Hungarians (2.77%)
3. Bosniaks (2.31%)
4. Roma (1.98%)
5. Others (5.41%)
6. Undeclared (2.05%)
7. Unknown (4.84%)

Serbia is home to many different ethnic groups.

The Serbs, a South Slavic people, are the titular nation and largest ethnic group in Serbia, their nation-state, making up 80.6% of the population.

Hungarians are the largest ethnic minority, concentrated predominantly in northern Vojvodina and representing 2.8% of the country's population. Bosniaks are the second-largest ethnic minority, mainly inhabiting the Sandžak region in southwestern part of the country, representing 2.3% of the country's population. Roma constitute 2% of the total population. All other ethnic groups individually account for less than 1% of the total population, including Albanians (0.9%), Slovaks and Croats with 0.6% each, Yugoslavs (0.4%), Romanians, Vlachs, and Montenegrins with 0.3% each; Macedonians, ethnic Muslims, and Bulgarians with 0.2% each; as well as Rusyns and Bunjevci with 0.1%, respectively. Some 0.1% declared regional identity (e.g. Vojvodinian) instead of specific ethnicity.

According to data from the 2022 Census, some 2% of the population did not declare their ethnicity since answering on the census question on ethnicity was not mandatory. The census category "Unknown" pertains to citizens whose data has been collected from administrative databases.

Ethnic group	1948 Census		1953 Census		1961 Census		1971 Census		1981 Census		1991 Census		2002 Census		2011 Census		2022 Census	
Ethnic group	Number	%	Number	%	Number	%	Number	%	Number	%	Number	%	Number	%	Number	%	Number	%
Serbs	4,651,819	80.2	4,963,070	80.4	5,477,670	82.0	5,788,547	80.4	5,972,661	77.3	6,252,405	79.9	6,212,838	82.9	5,988,150	82.8	5,360,239	80.6
Hungarians	433,618	7.5	441,748	7.2	449,377	6.7	430,145	6.0	390,321	5.0	343,800	4.4	293,299	3.9	253,899	3.5	184,442	2.7
Bosniaks	7,636	0.1	74,840	1.2	85,441	1.3	127,973	1.8	156,604	2.0	180,222	2.3	136,087	1.8	145,278	2.0	153,801	2.3
Muslims	7,636	0.1	74,840	1.2	85,441	1.3	127,973	1.8	156,604	2.0	180,222	2.3	19,503	0.3	22,301	0.3	13,011	0.2
Roma	40,951	0.7	46,896	0.8	6,624	0.1	35,301	0.5	76,833	1.0	94,492	1.2	108,193	1.4	147,604	2.0	131,936	2.0
Albanians	33,769	0.6	40,954	0.7	53,167	0.8	68,593	1.0	76,296	1.0	78,281^{*}	1.0	61,647	0.8	52,566^{*}	0.7	61,687	0.9
Slovaks	73,138	1.3	75,006	1.2	77,816	1.2	76,707	1.1	73,170	0.9	66,772	0.9	59,021	0.8	52,750	0.7	41,730	0.6
Croats	164,574	2.8	167,045	2.7	189,158	2.8	176,649	2.5	140,650	1.8	97,344	1.2	70,602	0.9	57,900	0.8	39,107	0.6
Yugoslavs					14,873	0.2	122,904	1.7	439,265	5.7	320,168	4.1	80,721	1.1	23,303	0.3	27,143	0.4
Romanians	63,112	1.1	59,689	1.0	59,492	0.9	57,399	0.8	53,676	0.7	42,316	0.5	34,576	0.5	29,332	0.4	23,044	0.3
Vlachs	93,440	1.6	28,047	0.5	1,367	0.0	14,719	0.2	25,592	0.3	17,804	0.2	40,054	0.5	35,330	0.5	21,013	0.3
Montenegrins	46,810	0.8	54,718	0.9	67,165	1.0	93,705	1.3	120,438	1.6	118,934	1.5	69,049	0.9	38,527	0.5	20,238	0.3
Macedonians	17,917	0.3	27,277	0.4	36,288	0.5	42,675	0.6	48,986	0.6	45,068	0.6	25,847	0.3	22,755	0.3	14,767	0.2
Bulgarians	59,395	1.0	60,146	1.0	58,243	0.9	53,536	0.7	33,294	0.4	26,698	0.3	20,497	0.3	18,543	0.3	12,918	0.2
Rusyns	22,667	0.4	23,720	0.4	25,658	0.4	20,608	0.3	19,757	0.2	18,073	0.2	15,905	0.2	14,246	0.2	11,483	0.1
Others	91,826	1.6	108,829	1.7	71,438	1.0	59,725	0.8	51,692	0.6	72,410	0.9	52,874	0.7	55,031	0.7	42,787	0.6
Reg. identity							10,258	0.0	6,749	0.0	4,841	0.0	11,485	0.1	30,771	0.4	11,929	0.1
Undeclared	369	0.0	1,994	0.0	5,604	0.0	4,486	0.0	7,834	0.0	10,538	0.1	107,732	1.4	160,346	2.2	136,198	2.0
Unknown	369	0.0	1,994	0.0	5,604	0.0	30,274	0.3	43,223	0.4	47,949	0.6	75,483	1.0	81,740	1.1	322,013	4.8
Note: data shown in the table are for Serbia excluding Kosovo.^{*} ethnic Albanians largely boycotted 1991 and 2011 censuses; their figures are an official estimations by the Statistical Office of Serbia.

== Religion ==
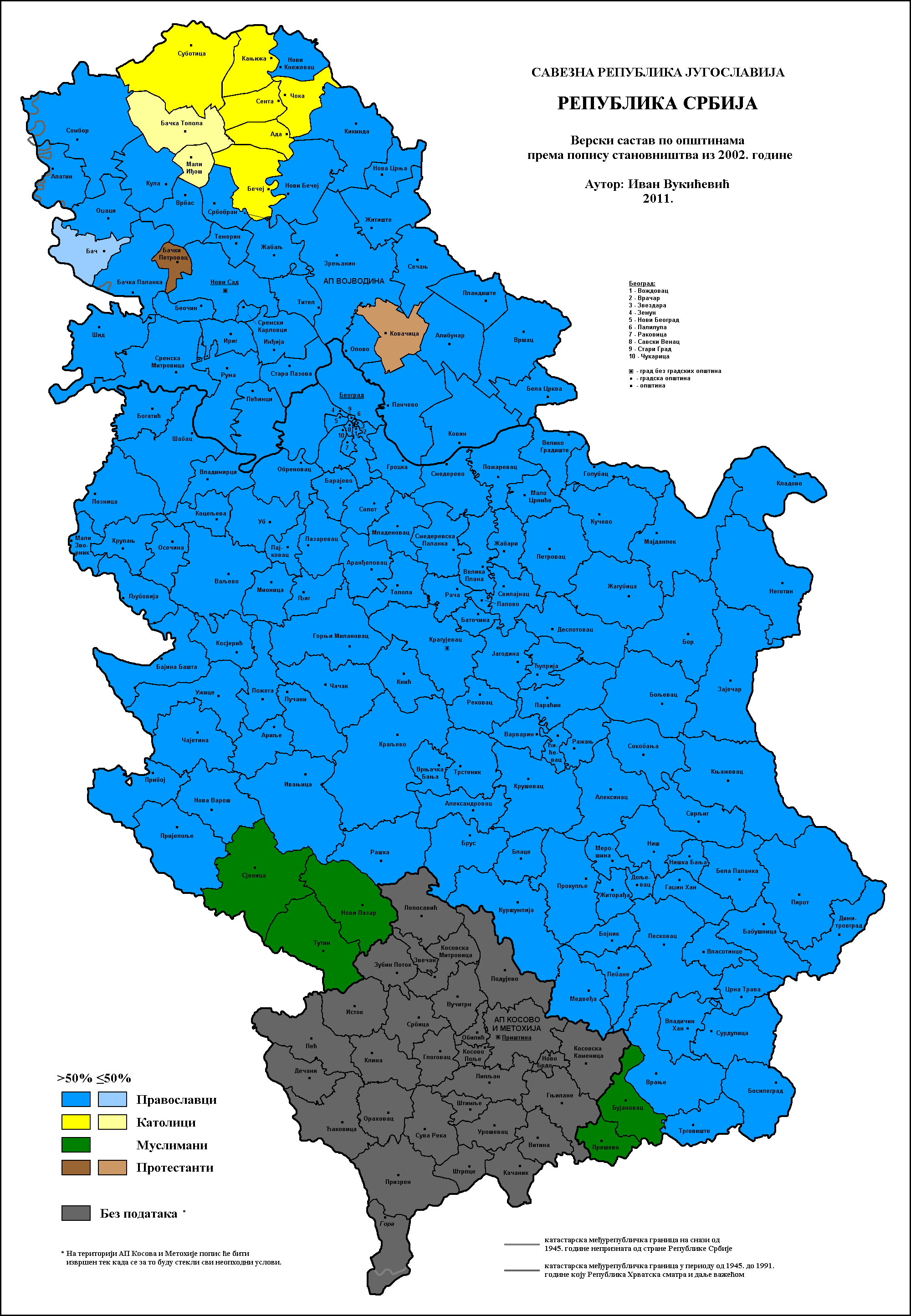
Religious map of Serbia

1. Eastern Orthodoxy (81.1%)
2. Islam (4.19%)
3. Catholicism (3.87%)
4. Protestantism (0.82%)
5. Others (0.94%)
6. Atheists/Agnostics (1.25%)
7. Undeclared (2.55%)
8. Unknown (5.35%)

Serbia is largely a homogeneous Christian country with Eastern Orthodoxy as main religion.

The Eastern Orthodoxy is by far the largest Christian denomination, with 81% of the population identifying as Orthodox. The Serbian Orthodox Church is the traditional church of the country, adherents of which are overwhelmingly ethnic Serbs but also smaller members of ethnic communities such as Montenegrins, Macedonians, Vlachs, and Bulgarians, as well as over half of country's Roma population.

Catholicism represents 3.8% of the population, adherents of which are mostly ethnic Hungarians and Croats.

Protestantism accounts for about 0.8% of the country's population, chiefly among ethnic Slovaks and a small part of ethnic Hungarians.

Islam, with 4.2% of the population, is the second-largest religion. It has a strong following among ethnic Bosniaks and Albanians; in addition, a quarter of the country's Roma population are Muslim.

A comparatively small portion of the population is non-religious or skeptical, with 1.1% identifying as atheist and an additional 0.1% as agnostic.

According to data from the 2022 Census, some 2.5% of the population did not declare their religion since answering on the census question on religion was not mandatory. The census category "Unknown" pertains to citizens whose data has been collected from administrative databases.

Religion	2002 Census		2011 Census		2022 Census	
Religion	Adherents	Share	Adherents	Share	Adherents	Share
Christianity	6,876,279	91.7%	6,555,931	91.2%	5,758,719	86.6%
Eastern Orthodoxy	6,371,584	85%	6,079,396	84.6%	5,387,426	81.1%
Catholicism	410,976	5.5%	356,957	4.9%	257,269	3.8%
Protestantism	78,646	1%	71,284	1%	54,678	0.8%
Other Christian	15,073	0.2%	48,294	0.7%	59,346	0.9%
Islam	239,658	3.2%	222,828	3.1%	278,212	4.2%
Judaism	785	0.01%	578	0.01%	602	0.01%
Other religions^{*}	6,889	0.1%	3,013	0.02%	1,207	0.01%
Atheism	40,068	0.5%	80,053	1.1%	74,139	1.1%
Agnosticism	40,068	0.5%	4,010	0.06%	8,654	0.1%
Undeclared	197,031	2.6%	220,735	3%	169,486	2.5%
Unknown	137,291	1.8%	99,714	1.4%	355,484	5.3%
Note: data shown in the table are for Serbia excluding Kosovo.^{*} mainly Eastern religions (Chinese folk religion, Buddhism, and Hinduism)

== Languages ==
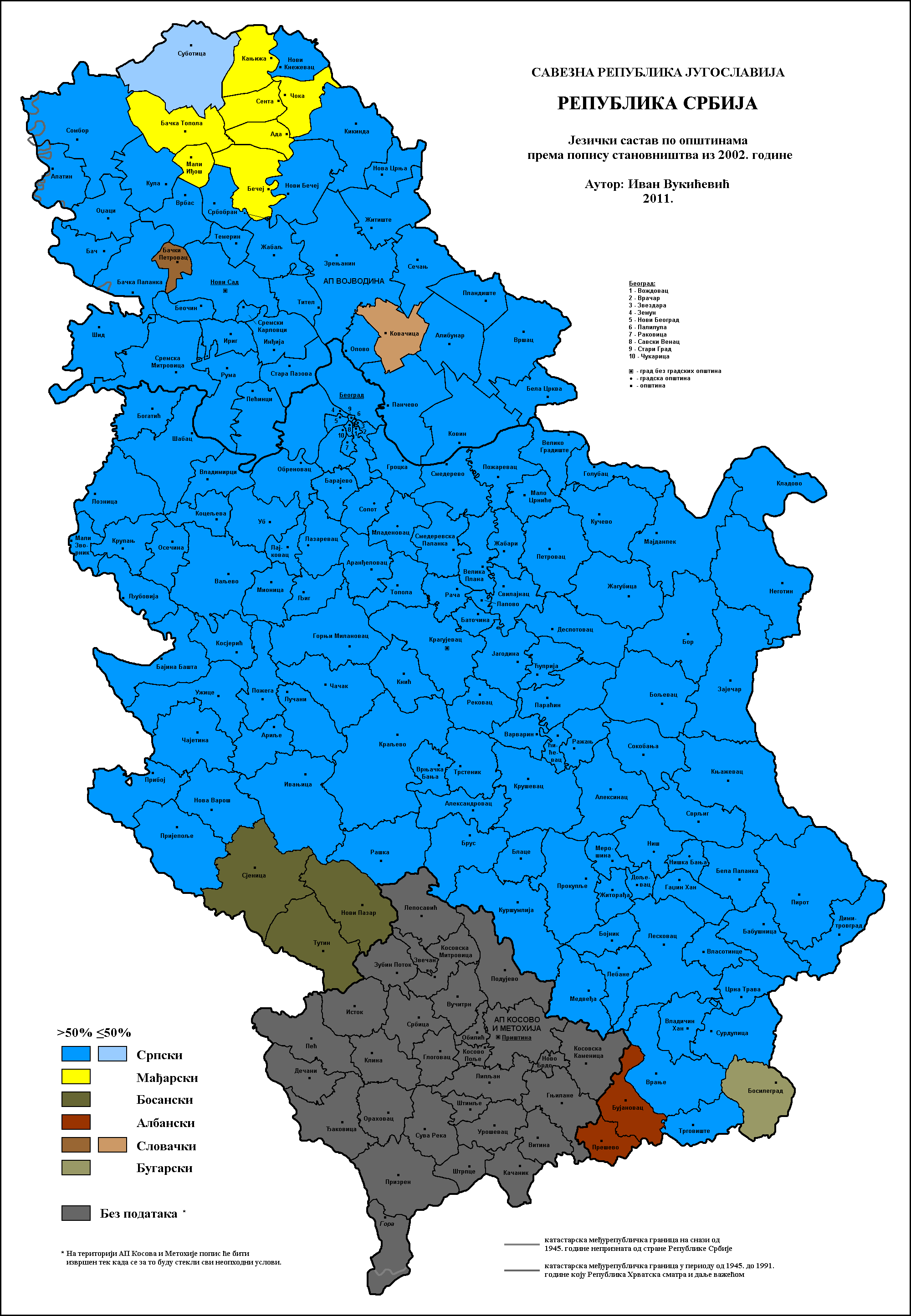
Linguistic map of Serbia

1. Serbian (84.4%)
2. Hungarian (2.57%)
3. Bosnian (2.18%)
4. Romani (1.19%)
5. Albanian (0.98%)
6. Slovak (0.58%)
7. Other (2.95%)
8. Undeclared (1.32%)
9. Unknown (4.56%)

Serbian is the official language of Serbia, member of the South Slavic group of languages and standardized variety of the Serbo-Croatian pluricentric language. Serbian is native language to 84.4% of the population, including almost all ethnic Serbs and majority of ethnic Montenegrins, ethnic Muslims, Yugoslavs, Croats, Macedonians, as well as over third of ethnic Roma and Bulgarians.

Recognized minority languages in Serbia are: Hungarian (native language to 2.5% of population), Bosnian (2.2%), Romani (1.2%), Albanian (1%), Slovak (0.6%), Romanian, Croatian, Russian, Macedonian, Rusyn, and Bulgarian. Bosnian and Croatian, as standardized varieties of the Serbo-Croatian, are mutually intelligible with Serbian. Minority languages are in official use in local government units where more than a 15% of the population consists of ethnic minorities or where local legislation mandates their use. In Vojvodina, official languages of the provincial administration, besides Serbian, include five minority languages (Hungarian, Slovak, Romanian, Croatian, and Rusyn).

According to data from the 2022 Census, some 2.5% of the population did not declare their native language since answering on the census question on language was not mandatory. The census category "Unknown" pertains to citizens whose data has been collected from administrative databases.

Language	2002 Census		2011 Census		2022 Census	
Language	Speakers	Share	Speakers	Share	Speakers	Share
Serbian	6,620,699	88.3%	6,330,919	88.1%	5,607,558	84.3%
Hungarian	286,508	3.8%	243,146	3.4%	170,875	2.5%
Bosnian	134,749	1.8%	138,871	1.9%	145,329	2.2%
Romani	82,242	1.1%	100,668	1.4%	79,687	1.2%
Albanian	63,835	0.8%	10,040	0.1%	65,475	1%
Slovak	57,498	0.7%	49,796	0.7%	38,584	0.6%
Vlach	54,818	0.7%	43,095	0.6%	23,216	0.3%
Romanian	34,515	0.4%	29,075	0.4%	21,477	0.3%
Croatian	27,588	0.3%	19,223	0.2%	12,048	0.2%
Russian	2,199	0.02%	3,179	0.04%	11,255	0.1%
Rusyn	13,458	0.1%	11,340	0.1%	8,725	0.1%
Macedonian	14,355	0.2%	12,706	0.2%	8,375	0.1%
Bulgarian	16,459	0.2%	13,337	0.2%	7,939	0.1%
Other	25,201	0.3%	53,276	0.7%	55,159	0.8%
Undeclared	63,877	0.8%	46,499	0.6%	88,122	1.3%
Unknown	63,877	0.8%	81,692	1.1%	303,179	4.5%
Note: data shown in the table are for Serbia excluding Kosovo.

== Migrations ==
Serbia has experienced predominantly negative net migration for decades. Over the past decade, Serbia saw an average annual net migration loss of approximately 12,000 people, underscoring a persistent demographic outflow, though recent influxes of Russian expatriates and South Asian laborers have occasionally tipped the balance toward positive in specific years like 2022.

=== Emigration ===
Compared to other Eastern European countries, Serbia experienced relatively low levels of emigration until the latter half of the 20th century. From the 1960s onwards, and particularly since the 1990s, Serbia has been a country of emigration. According to recent estimates, about 800,000 Serbian citizens or Serbia-born persons live abroad, predominantly in Europe and, to a much lesser extent, overseas (primarily in North America and Oceania).

In addition, there exists a sizable Serb diaspora, comprising ethnic Serbs and their descendants originating not only from Serbia itself but also from other autochthonous Serb-inhabited regions of the Balkans. This diaspora also resides predominantly in Europe, and to a lesser extent overseas.

Countries with significant population of Serbian citizens or Serbia-born persons. Serbia + 100,000 + 10,000 + 1,000

Country	Population
Germany	272,690 (2024) ^{*}
Austria	141,882 (2023) ^{**}
France	74,000 (2023) ^{**}
Switzerland	56,743 (2024) ^{*}
United States	42,968 (2023) ^{**}
Canada	31,925 (2021) ^{**}
Slovenia	30,248 (2021) ^{**}
Italy	29,679 (2024) ^{*}
Australia	25,454 (2021) ^{**}
Sweden	17,909 (2024) ^{**}
^{*} Serbian citizens ^{**} Serbia-born persons

=== Immigration ===
During the era of socialist Yugoslavia, Serbia experienced internal migrations, mainly consisting of movements of ethnic Serbs from other constituent republics like Bosnia and Herzegovina, Croatia, and Montenegro. These were often driven by urbanization, employment in Belgrade and other cities, or family ties. In the 1990s, the dissolution of Yugoslavia and ensuing wars lead to a massive influx (around half a million) of mainly ethnic Serb refugees from Croatia, Bosnia and Herzegovina, and Kosovo, making Serbia host to Europe's largest refugee population at the time.

In recent years, country has seen significant wave of immigration from Russia, following the outbreak of war in Ukraine. Some 53,000 Russian nationals settled in the country i.e. had been issued a residence permit.

There is a relatively present Chinese diaspora in Serbia; estimates are that up to 15,000 Chinese people live in Serbia, mainly in Belgrade, Bor, and Zrenjanin. First wave of Chinese immigration occurred during the late 1990s and was driven by relaxed visa policies, primarily traders from Zhejiang and Fujian who settled in Belgrade. Second wave is largely tied to economic activities, investments of Chinese companies in mining and manufacturing, and is concentrated in towns of Bor and Zrenjanin.

Additionally, the 2020s have witnessed a sizeable influx of South Asian migrants, primarily Indians, as working migrants on large-scale infrastructure projects and in transportation and courier services.

About two-thirds of the foreign-born population consists of ethnic Serbs from neighbouring countries: the most common countries of birth are Bosnia and Herzegovina (32%), Croatia (25%), and Montenegro (8%). The rest consist predominately of Russian nationals, and to a far lesser degree of Chinese and South Asian immigrants.

Foreign population in Serbia by country of origin Serbia + 50,000 + 10,000 + 1,000

Year	Arrivals
2014	5,082
2015	4,371
2016	4,103
2017	4,928
2018	5,441
2019	8,346
2020	9,312
2021	15,615
2022	34,618
2023	41,273
2024	32,353

Country of origin	Residence permits (2024)
Russia	53,140
China	12,286
India	4,574
Turkey	4,029
North Macedonia	1,952
Ukraine	1,472
Montenegro	1,382
Belarus	1,159
Croatia	1,146
Sri Lanka	1,092
Other	19,181

== Education ==
Literacy in Serbia stands at 99.3% of population while computer literacy is at 75.3% (45.7% have complete computer literacy).

=== Educational attainment ===
Year	Primary education or less	Secondary education	Tertiary education
1961	88.1%	10.0%	1.6%
1971	80.1%	16.2%	3.3%
1981	69.2%	24.5%	5.7%
1991	58.0%	32.1%	9.0%
2002	45.7%	41.0%	11.0%
2011	34.4%	48.9%	16.2%
2022	24.1%	53.1%	22.4%

== See also ==
- Demographic history of Serbia
- Demographic history of Vojvodina
- Demographic history of Belgrade
- Yugoslavia § Demographics
  - Demographics of the Kingdom of Yugoslavia
  - Demographics of the Socialist Federal Republic of Yugoslavia
- Demographics of Serbia and Montenegro

== Sources ==
- "2011 Census of Population, Households and Dwellings in the Republic of Serbia: Ethnicity" (PDF). Statistical Office of the Republic of Serbia. 29 November 2012. Archived (PDF) from the original on 4 September 2016.
- Radivojević, Biljana; Penev, Goran (2014). "Demographic Losses of Serbia in the First World War and their long-term consequences" (PDF). Economic Annals. 59 (203): 29–54. doi:10.2298/EKA1403029R.
