= Demographics of Serbia and Montenegro =

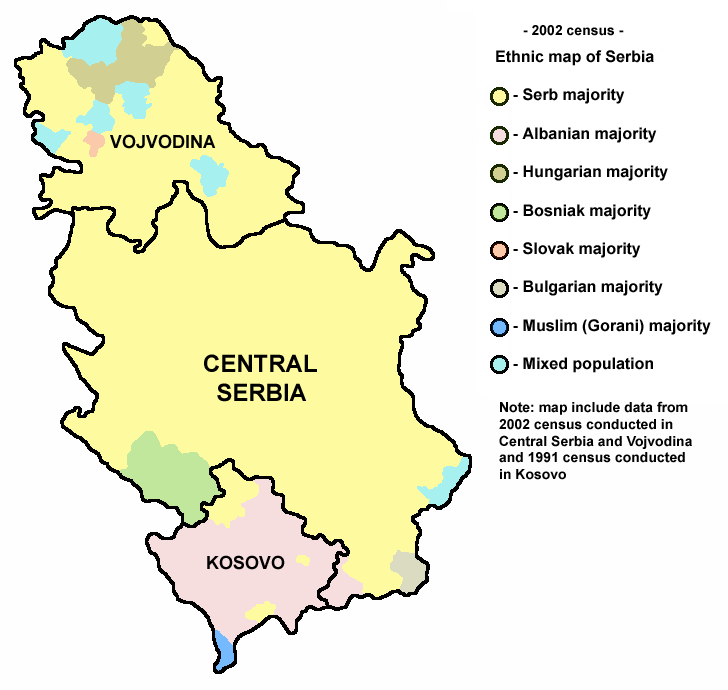
Ethnic map of Serbia in 2002

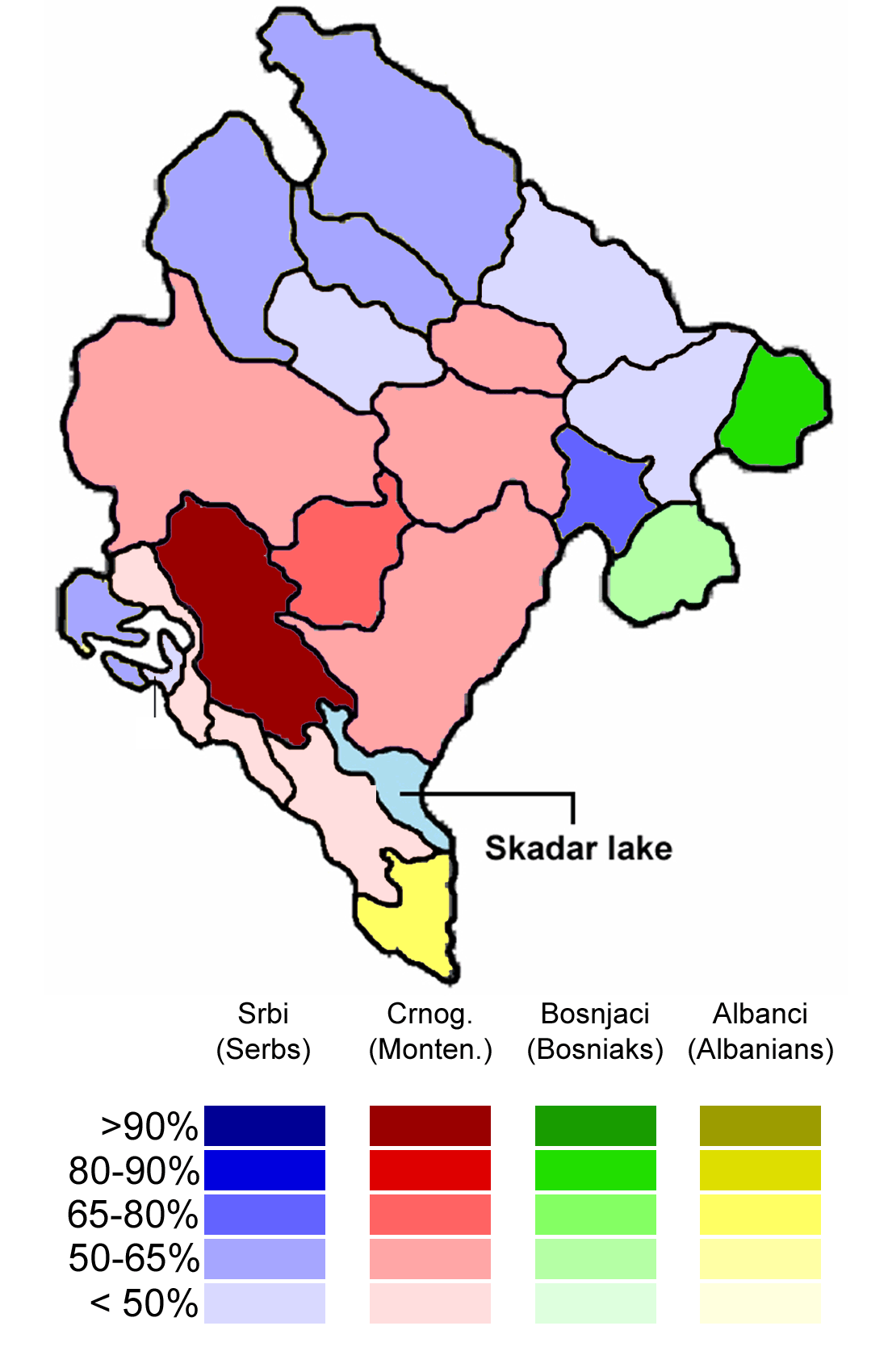
Ethnic map of Montenegro

Serbia and Montenegro was a country that existed from 1992 to 2006. It consisted of two constituent states, the Republic of Serbia and the Republic of Montenegro.

The total population of Serbia and Montenegro at the time of its dissolution in 2006 was approximately 9,746,130 with Serbia having 9,131,105 and Montenegro having 615,025 then. In 2000, in Serbia, 19.95% of the population was 14 and under (male 1,028,355; female 963,366); in Montenegro, it was 22.05% (male 77,582; female 72,395). 65.22% of Serbians (male 3,187,746; female 3,322,425) and 66.16% of Montenegrins (male 222,095; female 227,923) were between 15 and 64. 14.83% of Serbians (male 638,204; female 841,833) and 11.79% of Montenegrins (male 32,400; female 47,763) were 65 and over.

Estimates in 2000 placed Serbia's population growth rate at 0.739% and Montenegro's at -12.22%. The respective birth rates were 12.20/1000 (Serbia) and 14.9/1000 (Montenegro); death rates were 11.08/1000 (Serbia) and 7.9/1000 (Montenegro). The net migration rate was 6.29/1000 in Serbia and -29.18/1,000 in Montenegro. Total fertility rates were 1.7 children/woman in Serbia and 2.0 children/woman in Montenegro.

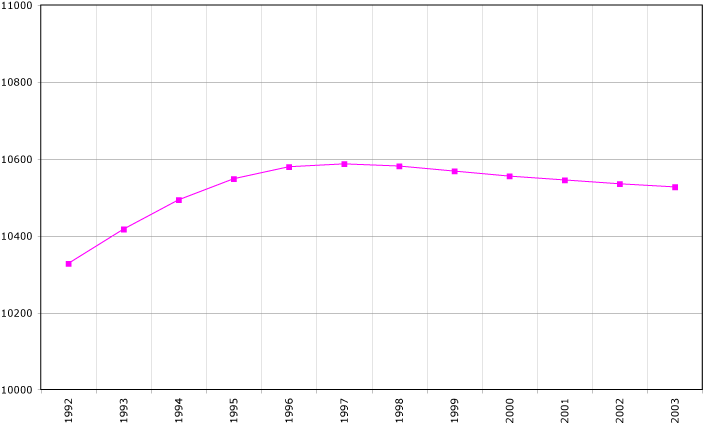
Demographics of Serbia and Montenegro, Data of FAO, year 2005; Number of inhabitants in thousands.

In 2000, Serbia's infant mortality rate was 20.13 deaths/1,000 live births; Montenegro's was 10.97 deaths/1,000 live births. Total life expectancy at birth was 72.39 years in Serbia (69.31 for males, 75.72 for females) and 75.46 in Montenegro (71.45 for males, 79.82 for females).

Ethnic groups in the region were represented as follows: Serb 62.6%, Albanian 16.5%, Montenegrin 5%, Yugoslav 3.4%, Hungarian 3.3%, other 9.2% (as of 2001). In terms of religion, 65% of inhabitants were Eastern Orthodox, 19% Muslim, 4% Roman Catholic, 1% Protestant 1%, and 11% other. The main languages spoken in Serbia and Montenegro are Serbian, Albanian, Croatian, Bosnian and Hungarian.

In 2002, 96.4% of the population aged 15 and over could read and write (98.9% of males, 94.1% of females).

Historical population
Year	Pop.	±%
1880	2,089,183	—
1890	2,642,142	+26.5%
1900	3,204,240	+21.3%
1910	3,826,034	+19.4%
1921	5,337,714	+39.5%
1931	6,048,272	+13.3%
1948	6,727,766	+11.2%
1953	7,244,433	+7.7%
1961	8,114,121	+12.0%
1971	9,276,125	+14.3%
1981	10,014,936	+8.0%
1991	10,532,601	+5.2%
2002	10,402,186	−1.2%
2011	10,625,593	+2.1%
2015	10,729,223	+1.0%

== Vital statistics ==
=== Vital statistics 1992–2006 ===
	Average population	Live births	Deaths	Natural change	Crude birth rate (per 1000)	Crude death rate (per 1000)	Natural change (per 1000)	Total fertility rate	Female fertile population (15–49 years)
1992	10,389,875	140,819	105,872	34,947	13.6	10.2	3.4	1.98	2,450,655
1993	10,390,945	140,985	107,396	33,589	13.6	10.3	3.2	1.97	2,476,910
1994	10,392,747	137,629	105,338	32,291	13.2	10.1	3.1	1.92	2,504,244
1995	10,393,841	140,504	107,535	32,969	13.5	10.3	3.2	1.95	2,533,427
1996	10,398,138	137,683	111,744	25,939	13.2	10.7	2.5	1.90	2,556,347
1997	10,399,279	131,394	111,845	19,549	12.6	10.8	1.9	1.81	2,566,228
1998	10,304,594	127,293	112,811	14,482	12.4	10.9	1.4	1.76	2,550,985
1999	10,214,585	121,070	114,406	6,664	11.9	11.2	0.7	1.68	2,534,790
2000	10,128,515	121,635	116,569	5,066	12.0	11.5	0.5	1.70	2,516,066
2001	10,057,754	124,686	111,111	13,575	12.4	11.0	1.3	1.75	2,500,209
2002	9,996,503	122,736	113,952	8,784	12.3	11.4	0.9	1.73	2,483,841
2003	9,919,214	119,363	116,067	3,296	12.0	11.7	0.3	1.69	2,457,449
2004	9,842,578	121,098	116,426	4,672	12.3	11.8	0.5	1.72	2,431,740
2005	9,798,810	116,750	119,817	-3,067	11.9	12.2	-0.3	1.66	2,405,756
2006	9,746,130	112,715	116,331	-3,616	11.6	11.9	-0.4	1.62	2,381,783

=== Marriages and divorces 1992 - 2006 ===
	Average population	Marriages	Divorces	Crude marriage rate (per 1000)	Crude divorce rate (per 1000)	Divorces per 1000 marriages
1992	10,389,875	63,563	7,136	6.1	0.7	112.3
1993	10,390,945	62,045	7,394	6.0	0.7	119.2
1994	10,392,747	59,803	7,005	5.8	0.7	117.1
1995	10,393,841	60,325	7,962	5.8	0.8	132.0
1996	10,398,138	56,719	7,896	5.5	0.8	139.2
1997	10,399,279	56,203	7,947	5.4	0.8	141.4
1998	10,304,594	56,105	8,002	5.4	0.8	142.6
1999	10,214,585	55,600	7,378	5.4	0.7	132.7
2000	10,128,515	62,166	8,904	6.1	0.9	143.2
2001	10,057,754	62,296	9,236	6.2	0.9	148.3
2002	9,996,503	64,021	11,525	6.4	1.2	180.0
2003	9,919,214	62,998	9,597	6.4	1.0	152.3
2004	9,842,578	62,459	10,643	6.3	1.1	170.4
2005	9,798,810	57,869	9,605	5.9	1.0	166.0
2006	9,746,130	59,043	10,154	6.1	1.0	172.0

== See also ==
- Demographics of Serbia
- Demographics of Montenegro
- Demographic history of Serbia
- Demographic history of Montenegro
- Yugoslavia § Demographics
  - Demographics of the Kingdom of Yugoslavia
  - Demographics of the Socialist Federal Republic of Yugoslavia
