= Yugoslav literature =

Yugoslav literature may refer to:

- Bosnian literature
- Croatian literature, medieval and modern culture of the Croats
- Macedonian literature, begins with the Ohrid Literary School
- Montenegrin literature, written in the South Slavic country of Montenegro, mainly in Serbian
- Serbian literature, written in Serbian or in Serbia
- Slovene literature, written in Slovene

== See also ==
- Yugoslav (disambiguation)
- Association of Writers of Yugoslavia
