= Yugoslavs (disambiguation) =

Yugoslavs has two connotations:

- Ethnic Yugoslavs, a pan-ethnic community of people from former Yugoslavia and its successor states
- Citizens of former Yugoslavia, regardless of self-identified ethnicity

It may also refer to:

- South Slavs, historically referred to as "Jugosloveni / Jugoslaveni" (lit. 'Yugoslavs')
- Yugoslavists, members of the Yugoslav movement, a political and cultural movement that advocated the creation of Yugoslavia
- Federal Party of Yugoslavs, former political party
- San Pedro Yugoslavs, former soccer team

== See also ==
- Yugoslav (disambiguation)
- Yugoslavia (disambiguation)
- Ethnic groups in Yugoslavia
