= Yugoslavia (disambiguation) =

Yugoslavia was a country in Southeast and Central Europe for most of the 20th century.

- Kingdom of Yugoslavia, during 1918–1941
- Democratic Federal Yugoslavia, during 1943–1945
- Socialist Federal Republic of Yugoslavia, during 1945–1992
- Federal Republic of Yugoslavia, 1992–2003, renamed to Serbia and Montenegro in 2003–2006

Yugoslavia (or Jugoslavija) may also refer to:

- 1554 Yugoslavia, designation for a stony asteroid in the middle region of the Asteroid Belt
- Jugoslavija (magazine)
- SK Jugoslavija

Ships named Jugoslavija:

- SMS Viribus Unitis
- SS Cattaro (1920)

== See also ==
- Yugoslav (disambiguation)
- Yugoslavs (disambiguation)
- Demographics of Yugoslavia (disambiguation)
- Yugoslavism
- South Slavs
