= Yugoslav =

Yugoslav or Yugoslavian may refer to:

- Yugoslavia, or any of the three historic states carrying that name:
  - Kingdom of Yugoslavia, a European monarchy which existed 1918–1945 (officially called "Kingdom of Serbs, Croats and Slovenes" 1918–1929)
  - Socialist Federal Republic of Yugoslavia or SFR Yugoslavia, a federal republic which succeeded the monarchy and existed 1945–1992
  - Federal Republic of Yugoslavia, or FR Yugoslavia, a new federal state formed by two successor republics of SFR Yugoslavia established in 1992 and renamed "Serbia and Montenegro" in 2003 before its dissolution in 2006
- Yugoslavs, either as citizens of the former Yugoslavia, or people who self-identify as ethnic Yugoslavs
- Yugoslav language:
  - "Yugoslav", a name proposed in 1861 and rejected as the legal name of the Bosnian-Croatian-Serbian language by a decree of the Austrian Empire
  - any of the languages of Yugoslavia

== People ==
- Jugoslav Dobričanin (born 1956), Serbian politician
- Jugoslav Lazić (born 1979), Serbian former professional footballer who played as a goalkeeper
- Jugoslav Vasović (born 1974), Serbian retired water polo player who played for FR Yugoslavia at the 2000 Summer Olympics
- Jugoslav Vlahović (born 1949), Serbian artist, illustrator, photographer, and former rock musician

== See also ==
- South Slavs, a subgroup of Slavic peoples who speak the South Slavic languages
- Yugoslav literature (disambiguation)
- Yugoslavia (disambiguation)
- Yugoslavian cuisine (disambiguation)
- Yugoslavs (disambiguation)
