= Demographics of the Socialist Federal Republic of Yugoslavia =

Yugoslavia demographics for 1945 to 1991

Population pyramid in 1991

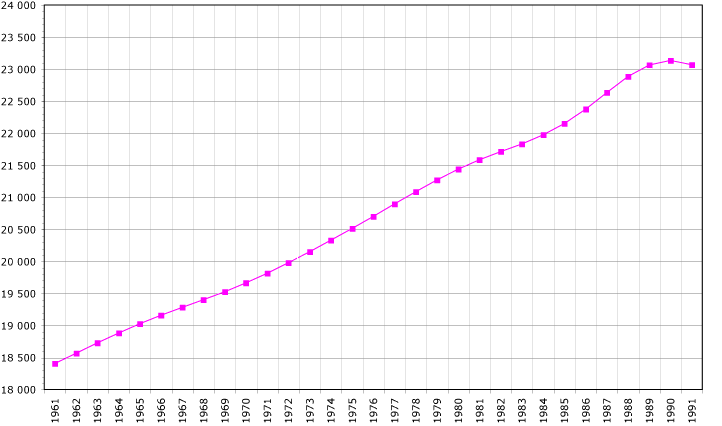
Population, 1961–1991, in thousands (FAO data, 2005)

Demographics of the Socialist Federal Republic of Yugoslavia, during its existence from 1945 until 1991, included population density, ethnicity, education levels, health of the populace, economic status, religious affiliations and other aspects. During its last census in 1991, Yugoslavia enumerated 23,528,230 people. Serbs had a plurality, followed by Croats, Bosniaks, Albanians, Slovenes and Macedonians.

== Ethnic groups ==
This is data from the last four Yugoslav censuses (1961, 1971, 1981, and 1991). Ethnic groups that were considered to be constitutive (explicitly mentioned in the constitution, and not considered minority or immigrant) appear in bold text.

Ethnic groups in Yugoslavia (1991)
1. Serbs (36.2%)
2. Croats (19.7%)
3. Albanians (9.30%)
4. Slovenes (7.50%)
5. Macedonians (5.80%)
6. Yugoslavs (3.00%)
7. Montenegrins (2.30%)
8. Hungarians (1.60%)
9. Others combined (14.6%)

Nationality	1961	%	1971	%	1981	%	1991	%
**Serbs**	7,806,152	42.1%	8,143,246	39.7%	8,140,507	36.3%	8,526,872	36.2%
**Croats**	4,293,809	23.2%	4,526,782	22.1%	4,428,043	19.7%	4,636,700	19.7%
**Slavic Muslims** (Note: Now referred to as Bosniaks, Torbeshi and Gorani people)	972,960	5.3%	1,729,932	8.4%	1,999,890	8.9%	2,353,002	10.0%
Albanians	914,733	4.9%	1,309,523	6.4%	1,730,878	7.7%	2,178,393	9.3%
**Slovenes**	1,589,211	8.6%	1,678,032	8.2%	1,753,571	7.8%	1,760,460	7.5%
**Macedonians**	1,045,516	5.7%	1,194,784	5.8%	1,341,598	6.0%	1,372,272	5.8%
Yugoslavs	317,124	1.7%	273,077	1.3%	1,209,024	5.4%	710,394	3.0%
**Montenegrins**	513,832	2.8%	508,843	2.5%	579,043	2.6%	539,262	2.3%
Hungarians	504,369	2.7%	477,374	2.3%	426,867	1.9%	378,997	1.6%
Romani			78,485	0.4%	148,604	0.7%	n/a	n/a
Turks			127,920	0.6%	101,328	0.5%	n/a	n/a
Slovaks			83,656	0.4%	80,300	0.4%	n/a	n/a
Romanians			58,570	0.3%	54,721	0.2%	n/a	n/a
Bulgarians			58,627	0.3%	36,642	0.2%	n/a	n/a
Vlachs			21,990	0.1%	32,071	0.1%	n/a	n/a
Rusyns			24,640	0.1%	23,320	0.1%	n/a	n/a
Czechs			24,620	0.1%	19,609	0.1%	n/a	n/a
Italians			21,791	0.1%	15,116	0.1%	n/a	n/a
Ukrainians			13,972	0.1%	12,716	0.1%	n/a	n/a
Germans			12,875	0.1%	?	?	n/a	n/a
Russians			7,427		?	?	n/a	n/a
Jews			4,811		?	?	n/a	n/a
Poles			4,033		?	?	n/a	n/a
Greeks			1,564		?	?	n/a	n/a
other/not determined	591,585	3.2%	136,398	0.6%	302,254	1.5%	n/a	n/a
Total	18,549,291	100.00%	20,522,972	100.0%	22,438,331	100.00%	23,528,230	100.0%

== Republics by population ==
The population data are from the 1991 census.

Rank	Republic/Province	Population 1991	%
1	Serbia	9,791,475	40.9%
---	(Socialist Republic of Serbia) Serbia proper	5,824,126	24.0%
2	Croatia	4,784,265	20.6%
3	Bosnia and Herzegovina	4,364,574	18.8%
4	Macedonia	2,033,964	8.8%
---	Vojvodina	2,012,605	8.6%
---	Kosovo	1,954,744	8.4%
5	Slovenia	1,962,606	8.2%
6	Montenegro	615,276	2.6%
	Yugoslavia	23,528,230	100%

Population of Yugoslavia by republics and provinces in 1991
Serbia	40.9%
Serbia proper	24.0%
Croatia	20.6%
Bosnia and Herzegovina	18.8%
Macedonia	8.8%
Vojvodina	8.6%
Kosovo	8.4%
Slovenia	8.2%
Montenegro	2.6%

== Republics by population density ==
Rank	Republic/Province	Population	Area (km^{2})	Density
---	Kosovo	1,954,744	10,887	183.1
1	SR Serbia	9,791,475	88,361	114.0
---	(Socialist Republic of Serbia) Serbia proper	5,824,126	55,968	99.4
2	Slovenia	1,962,606	20,251	94.5
---	Vojvodina	2,012,605	21,506	92.8
3	Bosnia and Herzegovina	4,364,574	51,129	85.6
4	Croatia	4,784,265	56,538	84.6
5	Macedonia	2,033,964	25,713	79.1
6	Montenegro	615,276	13,810	44.5
	Yugoslavia	23,528,230	255,804	92.6

Population density of Yugoslavia by republics and provinces in 1991
Kosovo	183.1
Serbia	114.0
Serbia proper	99.4
Slovenia	94.5
Vojvodina	92.8
Yugoslavia	92.6
Bosnia and Herzegovina	85.6
Croatia	84.6
Macedonia	79.1
Montenegro	44.5

== Largest cities ==
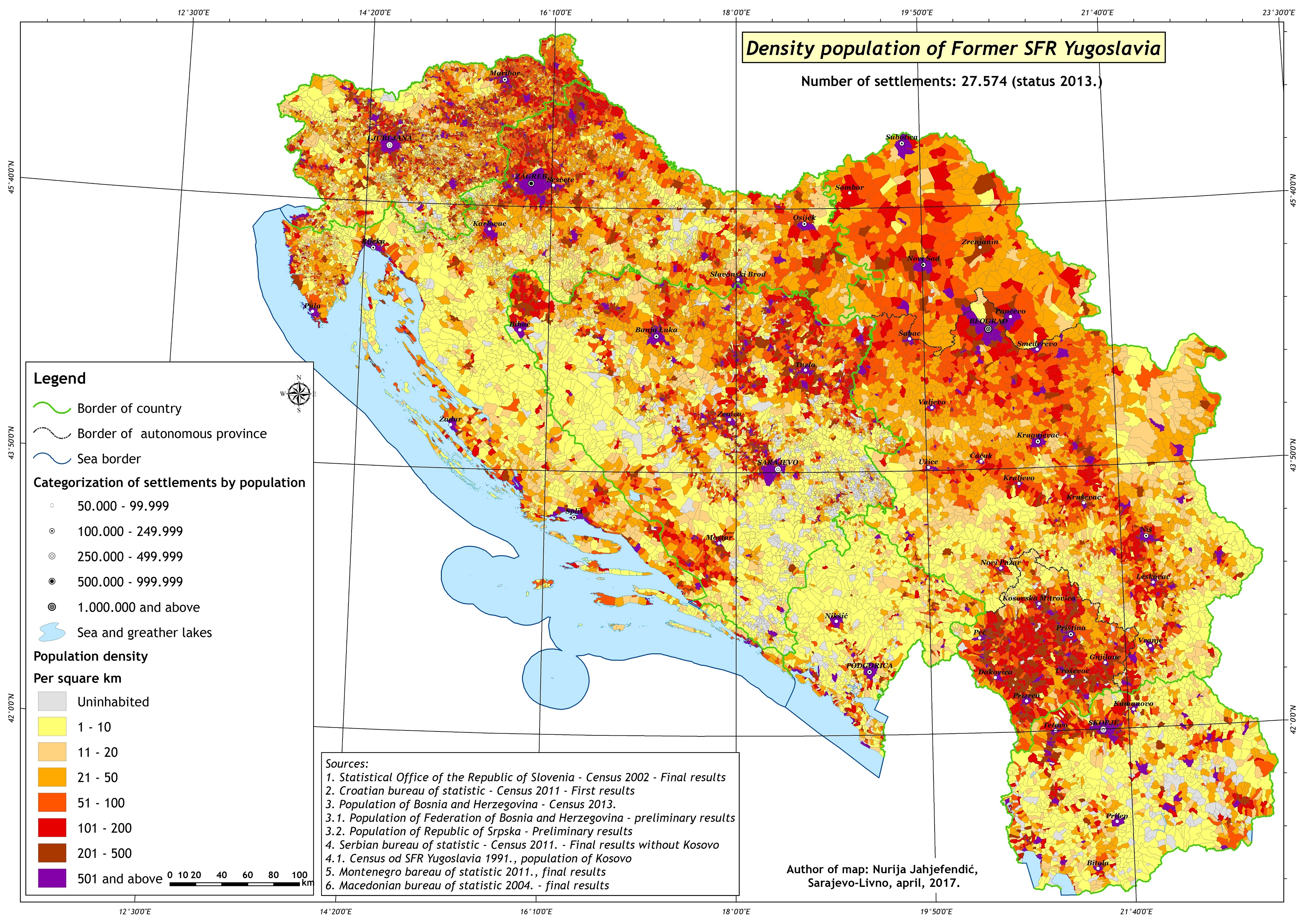
Population density of Yugoslavia by settlement

According to the 1991 census, there were 19 cities in Yugoslavia with more than 100,000 inhabitants. The population of these cities has developed as follows:

Population of the largest cities in Yugoslavia (in thousands)
City	1921	1953	1981	1991
Belgrade	111.7	470.2	1145	1168
Zagreb	108.3	350.8	768.7	933.9
Sarajevo	60.1	111.7	379.6	415.6
Skopje	41.1	119	405.9	444.7
Ljubljana	53.3	111.2	224.8	267
Split	25	61.2	169.3	189.4
Novi Sad	39.2	83.2	169.8	179.6
Niš	25.1	60.7	161	175.4
Rijeka	*	75.3	158.3	168
Kragujevac	15.7	40.6	87	147.3
Zenica	7.6	22.6	63.5	145.6
Banja Luka	18	30.4	123.8	142.6
Tuzla	14.2	25	65	131.9
Mostar	18.2	25.9	110.3	126.1
Titograd	8.7	13.6	95.8	117.8
Priština	14.3	24.1	69.5	108.1
Maribor	30.6	70.8	104.7	103.9
Osijek	34.4	57.4	104.2	104.8
Subotica	101.9	59.8	100.2	100.4

In addition to demographic changes, the incorporation of suburbs is also responsible for the changes in the number of inhabitants. Rijeka (Fiume) was still part of Italy in 1921.

== Vital statistics ==
=== Vital statistics 1947–1991 ===
Vital statistics	Average population	Live births	Deaths	Natural change	Crude birth rate (per 1000)	Crude death rate (per 1000)	Natural change (per 1000)	Total fertility rate	Female fertile population (15–49 years)
1947	15,679,000	416,799	199,902	216,897	26.6	12.7	13.8		
1948	15,901,032	446,634	214,015	232,619	28.1	13.5	14.6		
1949	16,133,000	483,663	217,180	266,483	30.0	13.5	16.5		
1950	16,339,860	492,993	212,165	280,828	30.2	13.0	17.2	3.77	4,411,195
1951	16,578,223	446,254	234,689	211,565	26.9	14.2	12.8	3.32	4,455,670
1952	16,793,498	498,172	197,520	300,652	29.7	11.8	17.9	3.65	4,500,131
1953	17,048,601	484,139	211,790	272,349	28.4	12.4	16.0	3.41	4,544,601
1954	17,284,632	493,567	187,521	306,046	28.6	10.8	17.7	3.40	4,600,326
1955	17,522,438	471,394	199,982	271,412	26.9	11.4	15.5	3.18	4,656,054
1956	17,690,580	460,235	198,497	261,738	26.0	11.2	14.8	3.04	4,711,776
1957	17,865,515	426,701	190,334	236,367	23.9	10.7	13.2	2.77	4,745,520
1958	18,034,999	432,399	166,801	265,598	24.0	9.2	14.7	2.79	4,749,438
1959	18,226,203	424,276	180,747	243,529	23.3	9.9	13.4	2.76	4,708,379
1960	18,402,257	432,595	182,693	249,902	23.5	9.9	13.6	2.83	4,689,628
1961	18,592,567	422,180	167,447	254,733	22.7	9.0	13.7	2.78	4,670,880
1962	18,815,935	413,093	186,843	226,250	22.0	9.9	12.0	2.68	4,766,916
1963	19,036,409	407,406	169,744	237,662	21.4	8.9	12.5	2.64	4,804,648
1964	19,260,364	401,104	181,255	219,849	20.8	9.4	11.4	2.62	4,861,010
1965	19,489,605	408,158	170,549	237,609	20.9	8.8	12.2	2.69	4,938,773
1966	19,739,122	399,802	159,570	240,232	20.3	8.1	12.2	2.64	5,043,670
1967	19,960,120	389,640	174,060	215,580	19.5	8.7	10.8	2.55	5,176,374
1968	20,121,246	382,543	174,800	207,743	19.0	8.7	10.3	2.47	5,291,934
1969	20,251,498	382,764	188,693	194,071	18.9	9.3	9.6	2.43	5,421,866
1970	20,386,272	363,278	181,843	181,435	17.8	8.9	8.9	2.27	5,492,906
1971	20,579,890	375,762	179,113	196,649	18.3	8.7	9.6	2.38	5,458,432
1972	20,797,221	380,743	190,578	190,165	18.3	9.2	9.1	2.36	5,518,843
1973	21,008,154	379,051	180,997	198,054	18.0	8.6	9.4	2.31	5,575,065
1974	21,223,359	382,947	177,691	205,256	18.0	8.4	9.7	2.29	5,596,395
1975	21,441,297	388,037	184,907	203,130	18.1	8.6	9.5	2.28	5,651,830
1976	21,674,043	392,364	182,965	209,399	18.1	8.4	9.7	2.26	5,684,130
1977	21,900,681	384,637	182,803	201,834	17.6	8.3	9.2	2.19	5,706,563
1978	22,121,687	381,387	191,087	190,300	17.2	8.6	8.6	2.16	5,720,058
1979	22,297,376	378,803	190,304	188,499	17.0	8.5	8.5	2.13	5,748,224
1980	22,359,500	382,120	197,369	184,751	17.1	8.8	8.3	2.14	5,776,387
1981	22,499,154	369,047	201,201	167,846	16.4	8.9	7.5	2.09	5,706,892
1982	22,646,153	378,814	203,272	175,542	16.7	9.0	7.8	2.14	5,686,451
1983	22,800,697	374,610	218,980	155,630	16.4	9.6	6.8	2.11	5,704,798
1984	22,954,868	377,362	214,725	162,637	16.4	9.4	7.1	2.11	5,729,944
1985	23,121,383	366,629	212,883	153,746	15.9	9.2	6.6	2.05	5,764,187
1986	23,259,342	359,626	213,149	146,477	15.5	9.2	6.3	2.00	5,830,545
1987	23,393,494	359,338	214,666	144,672	15.4	9.2	6.2	2.00	5,820,653
1988	23,526,195	356,268	213,466	142,802	15.1	9.1	6.1	1.98	5,838,991
1989	23,594,157	336,394	215,483	120,911	14.3	9.1	5.1	1.88	5,895,545
1990	23,657,623	335,152	212,148	123,004	14.2	9.0	5.2	1.87	5,922,912
1991	23,532,279	325,922	221,929	103,993	13.8	9.4	4.4	1.94	5,669,046
	Average population	Live births	Deaths	Natural change	Crude birth rate (per 1000)	Crude death rate (per 1000)	Natural change (per 1000)	Total fertility rate	Female fertile population (15–49 years)

=== Marriages and divorces 1947–1991 ===
	Average population	Marriages	Divorces	Crude marriage rate (per 1000)	Crude divorce rate (per 1000)	Divorces per 1000 marriages
1947	15,679,000	205,835	20,915	13.1	1.3	101.6
1948	15,901,032	203,822	24,586	12.8	1.5	120.6
1949	16,133,000	184,078	16,985	11.4	1.1	92.3
1950	16,339,860	185,965	17,879	11.4	1.1	96.1
1951	16,578,223	170,133	15,538	10.3	0.9	91.3
1952	16,793,498	176,055	12,359	10.5	0.7	70.2
1953	17,048,601	167,940	16,020	9.9	0.9	95.4
1954	17,284,632	171,547	16,053	9.9	0.9	93.6
1955	17,522,438	162,711	19,389	9.3	1.1	119.2
1956	17,690,580	156,379	19,336	8.8	1.1	123.6
1957	17,865,515	154,970	20,421	8.7	1.1	131.8
1958	18,034,999	170,242	21,856	9.4	1.2	128.4
1959	18,226,203	163,572	21,483	9.0	1.2	131.3
1960	18,402,257	168,120	22,085	9.1	1.2	131.4
1961	18,592,567	168,510	21,532	9.1	1.2	127.8
1962	18,815,935	162,672	21,198	8.6	1.1	130.3
1963	19,036,409	157,909	21,328	8.3	1.1	135.1
1964	19,260,364	166,998	21,405	8.7	1.1	128.2
1965	19,489,605	174,301	21,649	8.9	1.1	124.2
1966	19,739,122	168,789	23,042	8.6	1.2	136.5
1967	19,960,120	169,282	20,840	8.5	1.0	123.1
1968	20,121,246	170,470	20,984	8.5	1.0	123.1
1969	20,251,498	174,507	20,178	8.6	1.0	115.6
1970	20,386,272	182,704	20,473	9.0	1.0	112.1
1971	20,579,890	183,916	21,347	8.9	1.0	116.1
1972	20,797,221	186,156	22,040	9.0	1.1	118.4
1973	21,008,154	183,665	23,221	8.7	1.1	126.4
1974	21,223,359	181,192	24,802	8.5	1.2	136.9
1975	21,441,297	180,046	25,137	8.4	1.2	139.6
1976	21,674,043	174,918	24,431	8.1	1.1	139.7
1977	21,900,681	178,783	22,990	8.2	1.0	128.6
1978	22,121,687	178,819	24,180	8.1	1.1	135.2
1979	22,297,376	176,310	21,952	7.9	1.0	124.5
1980	22,359,500	171,439	22,583	7.7	1.0	131.7
1981	22,499,154	173,036	22,557	7.7	1.0	130.4
1982	22,646,153	172,359	22,715	7.6	1.0	131.8
1983	22,800,697	171,906	22,127	7.5	1.0	128.7
1984	22,954,868	167,789	22,260	7.3	1.0	132.7
1985	23,121,383	163,022	23,952	7.1	1.0	146.9
1986	23,259,342	160,277	22,557	6.9	1.0	140.7
1987	23,393,494	163,469	22,907	7.0	1.0	140.1
1988	23,526,195	160,419	23,127	6.8	1.0	144.2
1989	23,594,157	158,544	22,761	6.7	1.0	143.6
1990	23,657,623	146,975	20,551	6.2	0.9	139.8
1991	23,532,279	134,826	17,551	5.7	0.7	130.2
	Average population	Marriages	Divorces	Crude marriage rate (per 1000)	Crude divorce rate (per 1000)	Divorces per 1000 marriages

== History of national minorities in SFR Yugoslavia ==
=== Background ===
Some of the largest non-Slavic ethnic minorities – Hungarians of Serbia, Germans (predominantly Danube Swabians), Kosovar Albanians and Istrian Italians – had been considered "troublesome" by Yugoslav authorities already in the first, interwar Yugoslavia, in part for supporting their ethnic interests and nation states as opposed to pan-Slavic ambitions during World War I. Minority rights of non-Slavs were neither guaranteed nor upheld, but rather stifled if they had proved "anti-Yugoslavian". Education in Hungarian and German was limited, a number of Hungarian and German cultural societies had been banned in the Kingdom until the late 1930s, when the country drifted towards pro-axis positions. Nonetheless, local Germans collaborated with the Nazi occupation forces during World War II, and ethnic Hungarians generally welcomed the return of Bačka region to Hungary. The Yugoslav communist partisan movement was unpopular among those minorities, with the German Ernst Thälmann unit existing merely on paper and the Hungarian Petőfi unit numbering mere hundred men.

=== Legal status ===
Socialist Yugoslavia distinguished between its "nations" (narodi), the constituent South Slavic peoples, and its national minorities. These included other Slavic peoples, such as Bulgarians and Slovaks, and non-Slavic groups, such as Hungarians, Albanians, Turks and Roma. The 1946 constitution, adopted on 31 January 1946, guaranteed equal rights in the economy, politics, the army and education regardless of nationality and place of residence. Except for the Italian minority, whose status was also governed by international agreements, the position of minorities was regulated by Yugoslav law. A special statute of 1954 referred to the Italians as an "ethnic group". The constitutional law of 1953 added no new provisions on minorities.

The 1963 constitution replaced the term "national minorities" with "nationalities" (narodnosti) and defined Yugoslavia as a federation of "free and equal nations and nationalities". It guaranteed the nationalities the use of their languages, the development of their culture and the right to form their own organisations, and it obliged schools to teach in their languages. Under the 1974 constitution these rights were exercised mainly in the municipalities, the republics and the autonomous provinces. Federal laws were also published in Albanian and Hungarian.

After the war many primary and secondary schools teaching in minority languages were opened, and the Turkish, Albanian and Bulgarian minorities had schools in their own languages for the first time. Textbooks were printed in Slovak, Romanian, Ruthenian, Albanian, Italian and Turkish. In Vojvodina, 37 of the 45 municipalities officially used one or more nationality languages alongside Serbian, Hungarian in 31 of them. Minority languages were also used in the provincial assembly and in radio and television programmes.

=== End of the Second World War ===
Of roughly 500,000 Germans in Yugoslavia, many had fled with the retreating German forces by the end of the war. According to German sources, some 195,000 to 200,000 German civilians came under the new authorities. On 21 November 1944 the Presidency of AVNOJ adopted a decision that transferred the property of persons of German nationality to the state, except for those who had fought with the partisans, and most Germans lost their civil rights. About 100,000 German landholdings with a total of 637,939 hectares were confiscated, 68,035 of them in Vojvodina. At the end of 1944 the Soviet authorities deported between 10,000 and 30,000 Vojvodina Germans, mostly women, to forced labour in the Soviet Union. Most of the others were interned in camps. In January 1946 the Yugoslav interior ministry reported 117,485 Germans in camps, 105,740 of them in Vojvodina. The historian Vladimir Geiger writes that at least 50,000 to 60,000 members of the German minority died in the camps, and that about 50,000 of the victims had been identified by name. The camps in Vojvodina were closed by March 1948. Released internees were obliged to work for three years, mostly in mines, factories and farms, and could not leave their place of residence without permission. The 1948 census counted 55,337 Germans. Emigration became easier from 1955, and in the 1950s most of the remaining Germans moved to Austria and Germany.

In Bačka, Banat and Baranja, where most Hungarians lived, the partisan command introduced military administration on 17 October 1944. In the following weeks units of OZNA, the Yugoslav security service, carried out executions of Hungarian civilians. In Senta, for example, an OZNA unit killed detained Hungarians on 9–10 November 1944. The exact number is not known, but one contemporary report lists 79 names. In the preliminary results of a Serbian–Hungarian inter-academy commission set up in 2010, the historians Srđan Cvetković and Nebojša Stambolija recorded 7,866 Hungarian civilian victims in Vojvodina between 1941 and 1948. Most of them were killed in extrajudicial executions or sentenced to death, and the death toll was highest during the mass executions of 1944. The authors note that earlier figures of up to 40,000 Hungarian victims had been exaggerated.

In Istria, Rijeka and Zadar, which Yugoslavia gained from Italy, most of the Italian population left between 1943 and 1956, in what is known as the Istrian–Dalmatian exodus. The peace treaty of 10 February 1947 gave Italians the right to opt for Italian citizenship, and the London Memorandum of October 1954 allowed emigration from Zone B of the Free Territory of Trieste. The last mass wave of departures ended in 1956. Estimates of the number vary. According to recent Italian research cited by the Croatian historian Marica Karakaš Obradov, up to 300,000 people left these areas, among them 188,000 autochthonous Italians from Istria and Rijeka, and 80 to 90 per cent of the Italian population departed. The demographer Vladimir Žerjavić estimated that 186,000 to 188,000 Italians left the Croatian areas by 1956 and 30,000 to 35,000 the Slovenian area. Exile organisations give figures of 350,000 or more, which Karakaš Obradov considers politically motivated.

=== Emigration to Turkey ===
In the 1950s a large part of the Turkish and other Muslim population of Macedonia emigrated to Turkey. A Yugoslav–Turkish convention on the resettlement of the Turkish-speaking Muslim population had been signed in July 1938 but was never ratified by Turkey. After the war the first applications to emigrate were approved in early 1952, and emigration gained momentum after an interview given by the Macedonian leader Lazar Koliševski in March 1954. Between 1951 and 1958, 125,795 people moved from Macedonia to Turkey, most of them in 1955–1958. The number of Turks in Macedonia recorded by the census rose from 95,940 in 1948 to 203,938 in 1953. The historian Borče Ilievski attributes the rise largely to changed self-declaration, since some Muslims declared themselves Turks in order to be able to emigrate. The emigrants' motives included religion, the confiscation of land, family ties in Turkey and a 1951 law that banned the veil and closed religious schools. Muslims from Sandžak and Albanians from Preševo and Kosovo settled in some of the villages they had left.

=== 1950s ===
During the era of Tito–Stalin split, many Hungarians (who in 1953 made up around 25% of the population in Vojvodina) were sympathetic towards the Hungarian People's Republic, and the words of Radio Budapest spread among the villagers.

In the 1950s, various ethnic stereotypes about specific nations in the country were commonly recounted and circulated in the media. Bulgarians were reported to be a "poor and backward minority", while in contrast, Czechs and Slovaks were "industrious and valuable minorities" for Yugoslavia. Some Czechs and Slovaks also emigrated after the war, but a "large number" of them returned after communists seized power in Czechoslovakia in 1948.

=== Albanians and the autonomous provinces ===
The Albanians were the largest nationality. Albanian-language education was available from primary school to university, and Radio Television Priština broadcast daily in Albanian. After the dismissal of Aleksandar Ranković at the Brioni Plenum in July 1966, the position of the Albanians in Kosovo eased, according to the Kosovar historian Kosovar Basha. In October and November 1968 demonstrations in Kosovo raised the demand for a republic, and Albanians called for the founding of a university in Priština. The constitutional amendments of 1968 and 1969 gave the provinces of Kosovo and Vojvodina many elements of statehood and reduced Serbia's authority over them. The Serbian historian Igor Vukadinović argues that after Ranković's fall Albanian leaders, with the support of the federal party leadership, began to remove Serbs from state institutions in Kosovo. Under the 1974 constitution the Albanians and Hungarians, as the largest nationalities in Serbia's two provinces, had greater influence on Serbian and federal affairs than other nationalities. An Albanian, Sinan Hasani, was President of the Presidency of Yugoslavia in 1986–1987.

=== Population ===
Selected nationalities in the 1948 and 1991 censuses
Group	1948	1991
Albanians	750,431	2,159,920 (Note: Includes an estimate for Kosovo.)
Hungarians	496,492	376,445
Roma	72,736	206,136
Turks	97,954	108,832
Italians	79,575 (Note: Obradović gives 78,515 elsewhere in the same article.)	22,104
Vlachs	102,953	17,847
Germans	55,337	5,933

== See also ==
- Demographics of Bosnia and Herzegovina
- Demographics of Croatia
- Demographics of North Macedonia
- Demographics of Serbia and Montenegro
  - Demographics of Montenegro
  - Demographics of Serbia
    - Demographics of Kosovo
- Demographics of Slovenia

== Books ==
- Coggins, Bridget (2014). Power Politics and State Formation in the Twentieth Century: The Dynamics of Recognition. Cambridge University Press. ISBN 9781107047358. OCLC 1062293584.
- Judah, Tim (2008). The Serbs: History, Myth and the Destruction of Yugoslavia. Yale University Press. ISBN 9780300147841. OCLC 845556553.
- Lane, Ann (2017). Yugoslavia: When Ideals Collide. Macmillan International Higher Education. ISBN 9780230214071. OCLC 716811942.
- Skutsch, Carl (2013). Encyclopedia of the World's Minorities. New York: Routledge. ISBN 9781135193881. OCLC 863823479.
- Szajkowski, Bogdan (1981). Marxist Governments: A World Survey: Volume 3 Mozambique — Yugoslavia. Springer. ISBN 9781349043323. OCLC 492269719.

== Journals ==
- Basha, Kosovar (2023). "The Education of Albanians in Yugoslavia after the Second World War until 1974" (PDF). Historijski pogledi (9): 205–224.
- Cvetković, Srđan; Stambolija, Nebojša (2016). "An Analysis of the Index of Civilian Casualties in Vojvodina 1941–1948" (PDF). Délvidéki Szemle. 3 (2): 43–63.
- Forró, Lajos (2023). "Partizánmegtorlások utólagos igazolása Zentán a gyilkosságokat követő feljelentésekben" [Retrospective justification of partisan reprisals in Senta in denunciations made after the killings]. Délvidéki Szemle (in Hungarian). 10 (2): 114–130.
- Geiger, Vladimir (2013). "Represija nad pripadniki nemške manjšine na Hrvaškem, v Bosni in Hercegovini ter Vojvodini, 1944–1948" [Repression against members of the German minority in Croatia, Bosnia and Herzegovina, and Vojvodina, 1944–1948]. Prispevki za novejšo zgodovino (in Slovenian). 53 (1): 122–136.
- Ilievski, Borče (2010). "The Ethno-Demographic Changes in the 1950s in the People's Republic of Macedonia. The Emigration Process of the Turkish and Muslim Population". Macedonian Historical Review. 1. hdl:20.500.12188/25989.
- Karakaš Obradov, Marica (2013). "Emigracije talijanskog stanovništva s hrvatskog područja tijekom Drugog svjetskog rata i poraća" [Emigration of the Italian population from Croatian territory during the Second World War and the post-war period]. Radovi Zavoda za povijesne znanosti HAZU u Zadru (in Croatian). 55: 204–225.
- Obradović, Žarko V. (2018). "Položaj manjina u Jugoslavijama" [Position of minorities in Yugoslavia(s)]. Sociološki pregled (in Serbian). 52 (4): 1171–1195. doi:10.5937/socpreg52-19885.
- Shoup, Paul (1963). "Yugoslavia's National Minorities under Communism". Slavic Review. 22 (1): 64–81. doi:10.2307/3000388. JSTOR 3000388.
- Vukadinović, Igor (2020). "The Shift in Yugoslav-Albanian Relations. The Establishment of Ties between Albania and the Autonomous Province of Kosovo and Metohija (1966–1969)". Balcanica. 51. doi:10.2298/BALC2051235V.
