= Demographics of the Kingdom of Yugoslavia =

1918–1941 national demographics

The Kingdom of Yugoslavia was an interwar country. Its first census, conducted in 1921, recorded a population of 11,984,911, while its second and final census, conducted in 1931, recorded 13,934,038 people. Both censuses classified ethnic groups by mother tongue; however, the 1931 census did not record the kingdom’s constituent nationalities separately, instead listing all speakers of "Serbo-Croato-Slovene" as "Yugoslavs".

== Ethnic groups ==
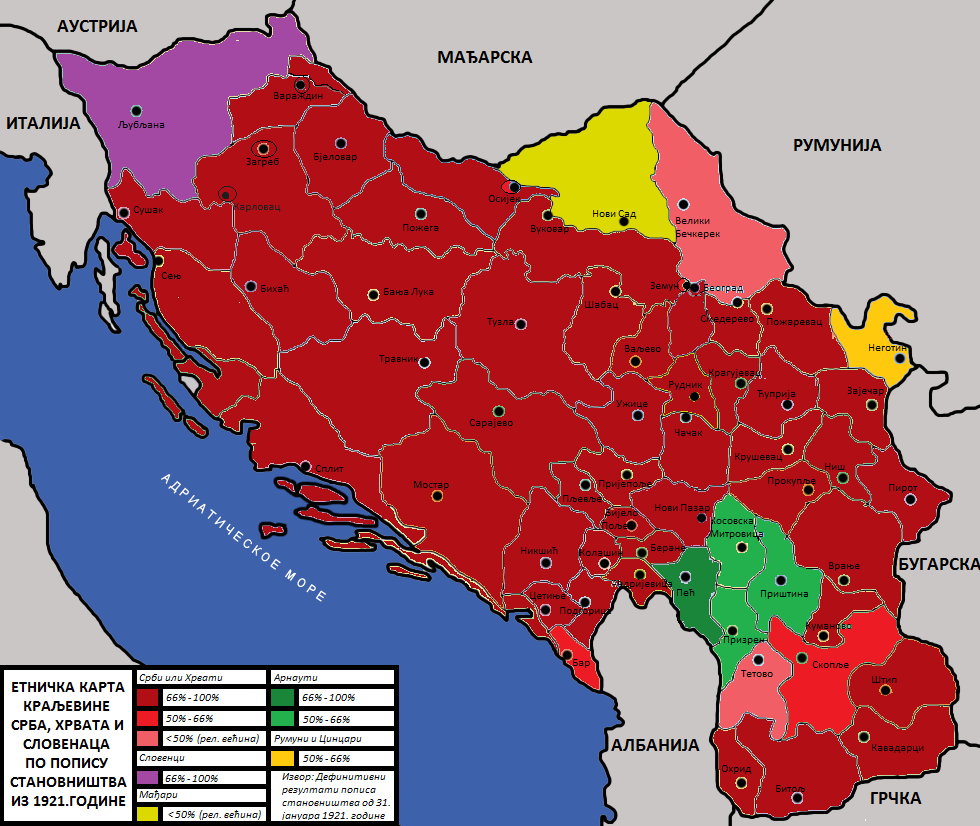
Ethnic groups in Yugoslavia according to the 1921 census Serbs or Croats (66%-100%) Serbs or Croats (50%-66%) Serbs or Croats (<50%, relative majority) Slovenes (66%-100%) Arnauts (66%-100%) Arnauts (50%-66%) Hungarians (<50%, relative majority) Romanians and Cincars (50%-60%)

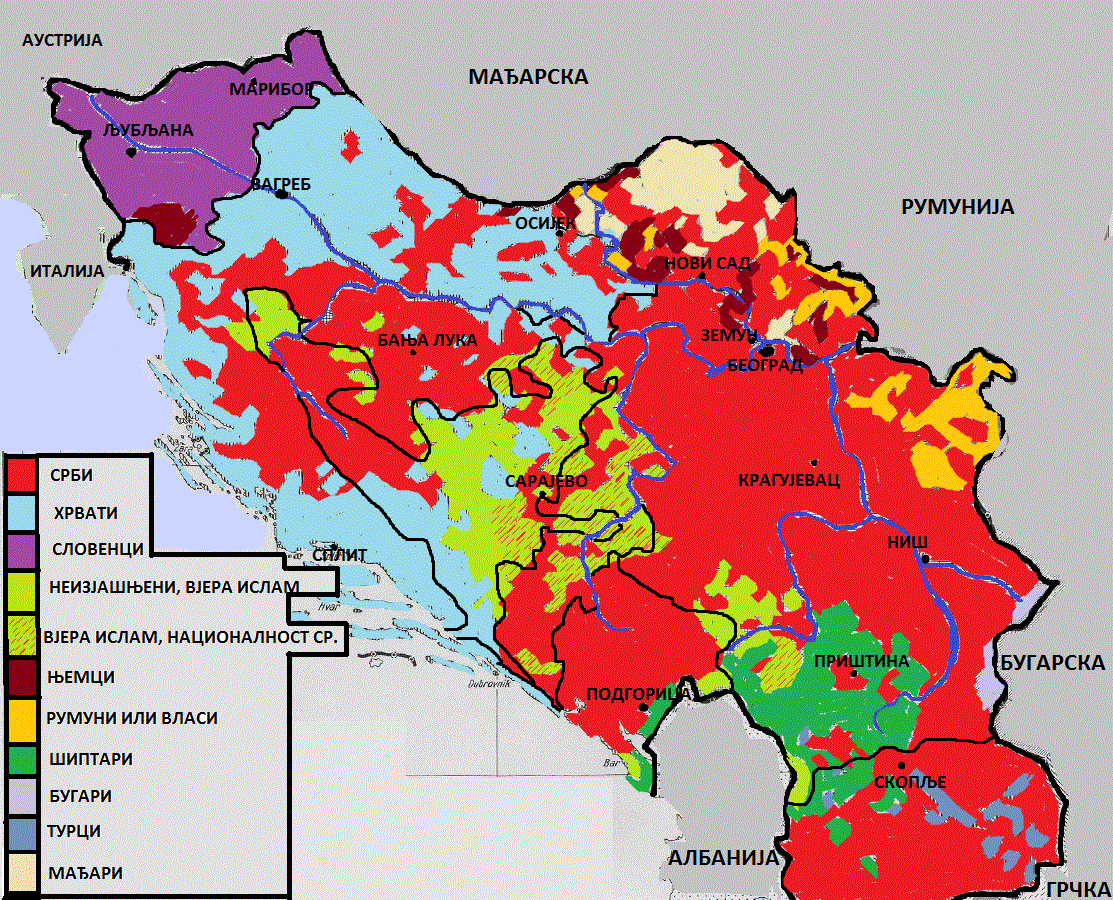
Ethnic groups in Yugoslavia according to the 1931 census Serbs Croats Slovenes Undeclared, Islamic faith Islamic faith, Serb nationality Germans Romanians or Vlachs Shqiptar Bulgarians Turks Hungarians

Kingdom of Yugoslavia's ethnic structure, 1918
Ethnic group	Number	Percent
Serbs	4,665,851	38.8%
Croats	2,856,551	23.8%
Slovenes	1,024,761	8.5%
Slavic Muslims	727,650	6.1%
Macedonians or Bulgarians	585,558	4.9%
Other Slavs	174,466	1.5%
Germans	513,472	4.3%
Hungarians	472,409	3.9%
Albanians	441,740	3.7%
Romanians and Cincari (Aromanians and Megleno-Romanians)	229,398	1.9%
Turks	168,404	1.4%
Jews	64,159	0.5%
Italians	12,825	0.1%
Others	80,079	0.7%
Total	12,017,323	100%
^{1} Source: Banac, Ivo (1992). The National Question in Yugoslavia. Origins, History, Politics (2nd printing ed.). Ithaca, NY: Cornell University Press. p. 58. ISBN 9780801494932. (The table represents a reconstruction of Yugoslavia's ethnic structure immediately after the establishment of the kingdom in 1918.)

Kingdom of Yugoslavia's ethnic structure, 1931
Ethnic group	Number
Serbs	5,963,000
Croats	3,221,000
Slovenes	1,133,000
Bosnian Muslims	729,000
Macedonians	642,000
Germans	498,000
Albanians	479,000
Hungarians	467,000
Turks	353,000
Czechs and Slovaks	153,000
Romanians	134,000
Jews	68,000
Others	174,000
Total	14,014,000
^{1} Source: Jovanović, Vladan (2011). Вардарска Бановина 1929–1941 (PDF) (in Serbian). Belgrade: Institute for Recent History of Serbia. p. 53-54. (The table represents a reconstruction of Yugoslavia’s ethnic structure based on a document from the corpus of the Ministerial Council of the Kingdom of Yugoslavia, which provides a detailed ethnic breakdown contrary to the principle on which the 1931 census was conducted and to which reference was later made retroactively.)

Kingdom of Yugoslavia's ethnic structure, 1939
Ethnic group	Number	Percent
Serbs	5,167,300	37.08%
Croats	4,010,000	28.88%
Bulgarians (including Macedonians)	1,165,100	8.32%
Slovenes	1,101,500	7.90%
Germans	498,600	3.58%
Albanians	478,600	3.43%
Hungarians	467,300	3.35%
Montenegrins	284,100	1.75%
Slavic Muslims	281,000	1.72%
Romanians	134,300	0.96%
Turks	132,200	0.95%
Slovaks	71,500	
Roma	64,900	
Czechs	52,200	
Russians	36,600	
Ukrainians	30,900	
Spanish Jews	27,600	
Pomaks	18,600	
Total	14,022,300	100%
^{1} Source: Jovanović, Vladan (2011). Вардарска Бановина 1929–1941 (PDF) (in Serbian). Belgrade: Institute for Recent History of Serbia. p. 54-55. (The table represents a reconstruction of Yugoslavia’s ethnic structure according to the journal National Minorities (3-4/1939).)

== Vital statistics (1919–1940) ==
	Average population	Live births	Deaths	Natural change	Crude birth rate (per 1,000)	Crude death rate (per 1,000)	Natural change (per 1,000)	Total fertility rate
1919	11,706,957	347,748	258,638	89,110	29.7	22.1	7.6	4.83
1920	11,881,764	422,267	250,090	172,177	35.5	21.0	14.5	4.79
1921	12,059,178	442,530	252,104	190,426	36.7	20.9	15.8	4.75
1922	12,239,245	420,910	254,478	166,432	34.4	20.8	13.6	4.70
1923	12,421,997	432,779	252,543	180,236	34.8	20.3	14.5	4.66
1924	12,607,480	442,835	254,527	188,308	35.1	20.2	14.9	4.62
1925	12,795,732	437,070	239,429	197,641	34.2	18.7	15.4	4.57
1926	12,986,796	459,035	244,761	214,274	35.3	18.8	16.5	4.53
1927	13,180,709	451,617	276,294	175,323	34.3	21.0	13.3	4.49
1928	13,377,523	437,523	272,606	164,917	32.7	20.4	12.3	4.44
1929	13,577,272	452,544	286,249	166,295	33.3	21.1	12.2	4.40
1930	13,780,006	489,270	261,497	227,773	35.5	19.0	16.5	4.36
1931	13,982,000	470,275	276,840	193,435	33.6	19.8	13.8	4.31
1932	14,174,000	465,935	272,180	193,755	32.9	19.2	13.7	4.27
1933	14,369,000	452,229	243,717	208,512	31.5	17.0	14.5	4.22
1934	14,566,000	460,913	248,882	212,031	31.6	17.1	14.6	4.18
1935	14,767,000	441,728	248,978	192,750	29.9	16.9	13.1	4.14
1936	14,970,000	435,861	240,879	194,982	29.1	16.1	13.0	4.09
1937	15,172,000	424,448	242,337	182,111	28.0	16.0	12.0	4.05
1938	15,384,000	411,381	240,303	171,078	26.7	15.6	11.1	4.01
1939	15,596,000	403,938	233,196	170,742	25.9	15.0	10.9	3.96
1940	15,811,000							

== Marriages and divorces (1919–1940) ==
	Average population	Marriages	Divorces	Crude marriage rate (per 1000)	Crude divorce rate (per 1000)	Divorces per 1000 marriages
1919	11,706,957	225,605		19.3		
1920	11,881,764	185,954	5,687	15.7	0.5	30.6
1921	12,059,178	157,055	6,720	13.0	0.6	42.8
1922	12,239,245	131,776	6,548	10.8	0.5	49.7
1923	12,421,997	129,796	6,492	10.4	0.5	50.0
1924	12,607,480	114,896	5,508	9.1	0.4	47.9
1925	12,795,732	123,005	5,481	9.6	0.4	44.6
1926	12,986,796	124,249	4,940	9.6	0.4	39.8
1927	13,180,709	124,104	5,254	9.4	0.4	42.3
1928	13,377,523	121,334	5,580	9.1	0.4	46.0
1929	13,577,272	128,120	6,070	9.4	0.4	47.4
1930	13,780,006	138,322	5,826	10.0	0.4	42.1
1931	13,982,000	126,072	6,393	9.0	0.5	50.7
1932	14,174,000	111,059	5,231	7.8	0.4	47.1
1933	14,369,000	111,503	5,500	7.8	0.4	49.3
1934	14,566,000	99,704	5,520	6.8	0.4	55.4
1935	14,767,000	110,129	5,561	7.5	0.4	50.5
1936	14,970,000	109,528	5,022	7.3	0.3	45.9
1937	15,172,000	117,717	6,547	7.8	0.4	55.6
1938	15,384,000	121,605	6,466	7.9	0.4	53.2
1939	15,596,000	123,817	7,103	7.9	0.5	57.4
1940	15,811,000					

== Languages ==
The following data, grouped by first language, is from the 1921 population census:

- Serbo-Croatian: 8,911,509 (74.4%)
  - Serbs, Macedonian Slavs and Montenegrins: 44.6%
  - Croats: 23.5%
  - Muslims of Yugoslavia: 6.3%
- Slovene: 1,019,997 (8.5%)
- German: 505,790 (4.2%)
- Hungarian: 467,658 (3.9%)
- Albanian: 439,657 (3.7%)
- Romanian: 231,068 (1.9%)
- Turkish: 150,322 (1.3%)
- Czech and Slovak: 115,532 (1.0%)
- Ruthenian: 25,615 (0.2%)
- Russian: 20,568 (0.2%)
- Polish: 14,764 (0.1%)
- Italian: 12,553 (0.1%)
- Others: 69,878 (0.6%)

Based on language, the Yugoslavs (collectively Serbs, Croats, Slovenes and other South-Slavic groups in the kingdom) constituted 82.9% of the country's population.

== Religious groups ==
- Christian: 10,571,569 (88.2%)
  - Eastern Orthodox: 5,593,057 (46.7%)
  - Roman Catholic: 4,708,657 (39.3%)
  - Protestant: 229,517 (1.9%)
  - Greek Catholic: 40,338 (0.3%)
- Sunni Muslim: 1,345,271 (11.2%)
- Jewish: 64,746 (0.5%)
- others: 1,944 (nil%)
- atheists: 1,381 (nil%)

== Class and occupation ==
- Agriculture, forestry and fishing – 78.9%
- Industry and handicrafts – 9.9%
- Banking, trade and traffic – 4.4%
- Public service, free profession and military – 3.8%
- Other professions – 3.1%
