= Germans of Romania =

Ethnic minority in Romania

German: Rumäniendeutsche Deutsche aus Rumänien Deutsch-Rumänen
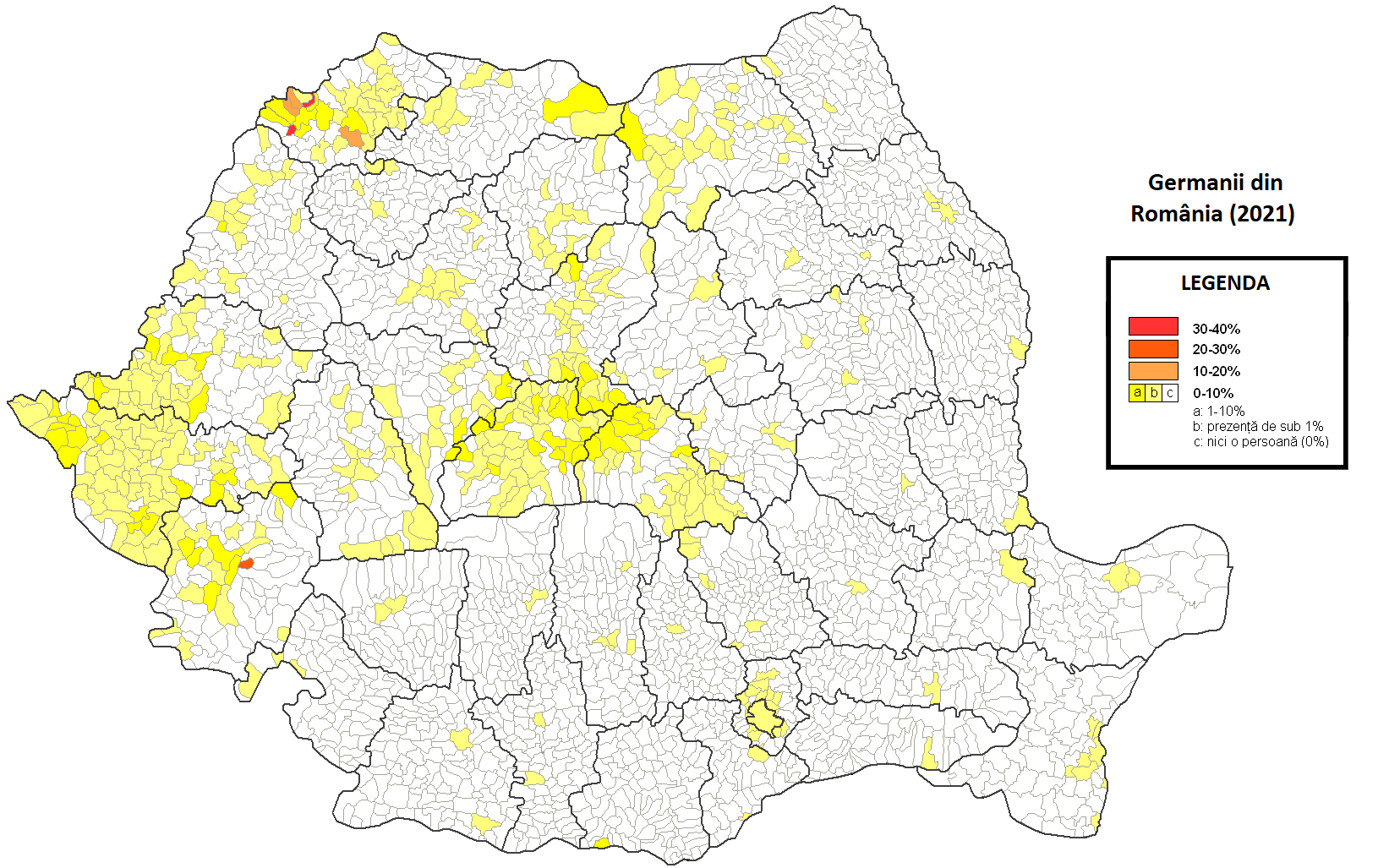
- Map depicting the distribution of ethnic Germans in Romania (according to the 2021 census which was postponed to and conducted in 2022 because of the COVID-19 pandemic)

Total population
- c. 22,900 (as per the 2021 Romanian census)

Regions with significant populations
- Romania Mainly in: Transylvania (Sibiu County, Brașov County, Satu Mare County); Banat (Timiș County); Bukovina (Suceava County); Bucharest

Languages
- Mainly German (i.e. Hochdeutsch and dialects) but also Romanian and Hungarian Dialects: Transylvanian Saxon; Walser German; Transylvanian Landler; Swabian German (including Sathmar Swabian and Banat Swabian); Zipser German

Religion
- Majority Latin Catholics (12,495), but also Lutherans (Evangelical Church of the Augsburg Confession in Romania), Romanian Orthodox and other confessions

Related ethnic groups
- Mainly Germans and Austrians Also related: Other Germanic-speaking peoples; German diaspora; Luxembourgers; Flemings; Walloons; Germans of Slovakia; Germans of Hungary; Germans of Poland; Germans of Croatia; Germans of Serbia; Germans of Bulgaria

The Germans of Romania (German: Rumäniendeutsche; Romanian: Germanii din România or germani-români; Hungarian: romániai németek) represent one of the most significant historical ethnic minorities of Romania from the modern period onwards.

Throughout the interwar period, the total number of ethnic Germans in the country amounted to as many as c. 800,000 (according to some sources and estimates dating to 1939, just on the verge of World War II), a figure which has subsequently drastically fallen to c. 36,000 (according to the 2011 census) and dropped even more to c. 22,900 (as per the 2021 Romanian census, postponed one year because of the COVID-19 pandemic and conducted in 2022).

== Overview and classification of Romanian-Germans ==
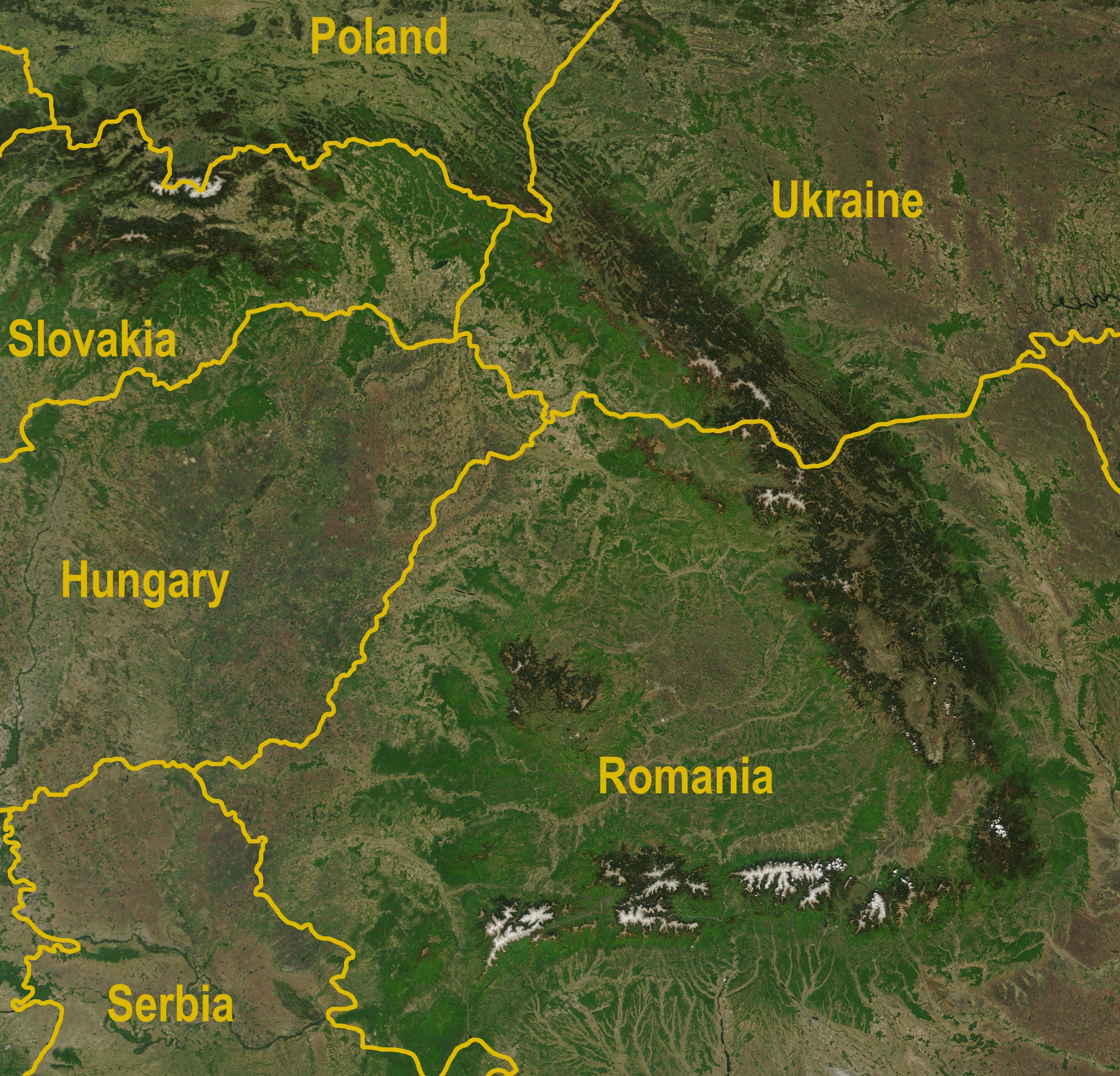
A physical map depicting Romania and the neighbouring countries. Most of the Germans of Romania and their constituent sub-groups initially settled along the Carpathian Mountains (and inside the Carpathian Basin), a mountain range which stretches from the north-east to the south-west of the country.

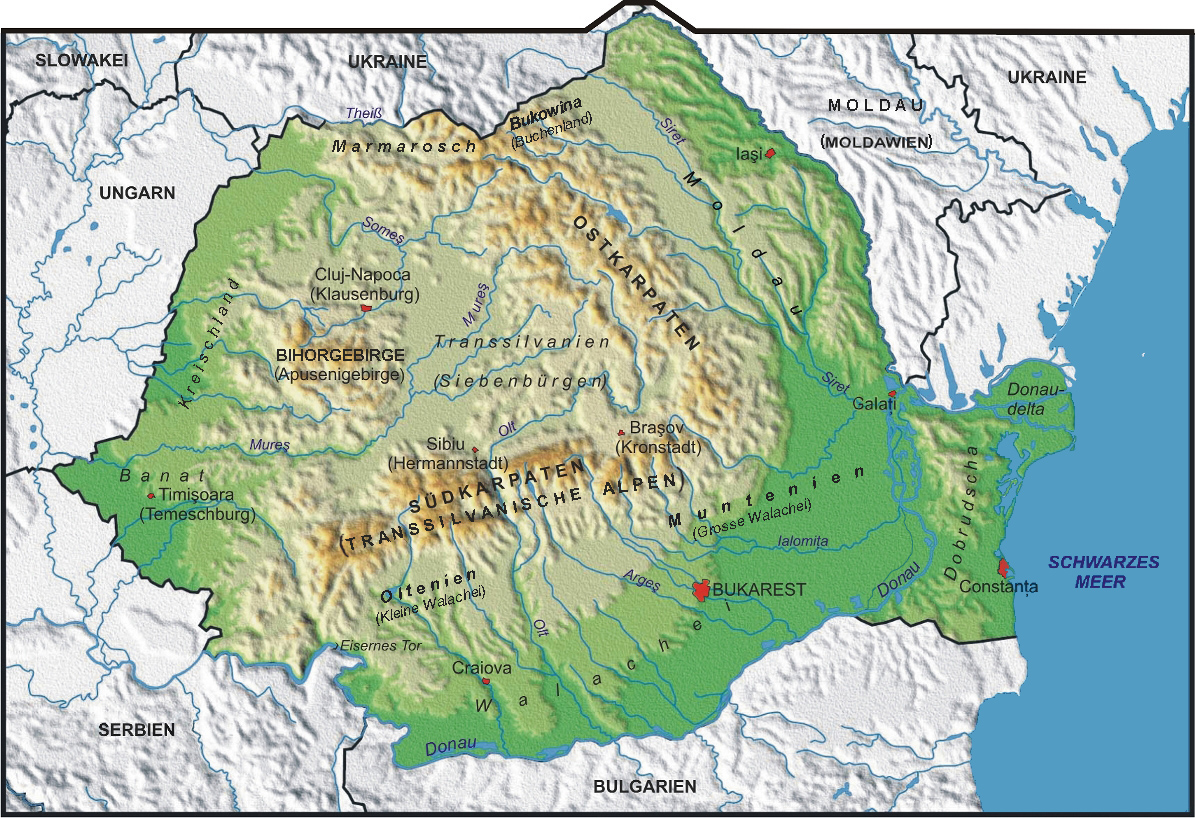
Topographic map of Romania, highlighting the three most important areas of settlement of the Romanian-German community: Transylvania (German: Siebenbürgen), Banat (German: Banat), and Bukovina (German: Buchenland or Bukowina).

The Germans of Romania (or Romanian-Germans) are not a single, unitary, homogeneous group, but rather a series of various regional sub-groups, each with their different culture, traditions, folklore, dialect or dialects, and history.

This claim stems from the fact that various German-speaking populations had previously arrived in the territory of present-day Romania in different waves or stages of settlement, initially starting with the High Middle Ages, firstly to southern and northeastern Transylvania, Kingdom of Hungary (some of them even crossing the outer Carpathians to neighbouring Moldavia and Wallachia), then subsequently during the Modern Age in other Habsburg-ruled lands (such as Bukovina, at the time part of Cisleithania, or the Banat).

Subsequently, the Romanian Old Kingdom (Romanian: Vechiul Regat, German: Altreich) was also colonized by Germans, firstly in Dobruja and then gradually in other areas of Moldavia and Wallachia.

Detailed map depicting the traditional settlement areas of the Romanian-Germans in Transylvania and Banat, two historical regions situated in central, respectively southwestern present-day Romania

Therefore, given their rather complex geographic background and the fact that major border changes took place in the region throughout history (after World War I, Romania expanded its territory from the pre-war 137,000 km^{2} (53,000 sq mi) to 295,049 km^{2} (113,919 sq mi)), the Germans of Romania are generally divided into the following independent sub-groups in an attempt to better understand their language, culture, customs, and history:

- Transylvanian Saxons – the largest and oldest German community in the territory of modern-day Romania (often simply equated with all Romanian-Germans);
- Transylvanian Landlers – expelled Protestants (Evangelical Lutherans) from the region of Salzkammergut, contemporary Austria to southern Transylvania during the 18th century;
- Danube Swabian (German: Donauschwaben) sub-groups in Romania
  - Most Banat Swabians, including the Banat Highland Germans (German: Banater Berglanddeutsche);
  - The Sathmar Swabians in their entirety
- Bukovina Germans – once with a sizable or overwhelming demographic presence in all urban centres from the historical region of Bukovina (more specifically Suceava, Gura Humorului, Siret, Rădăuți, Vatra Dornei, and Câmpulung Moldovenesc) or some rural areas of the nowadays Suceava County in northeastern Romania; equally indigenous to Cernăuți and contemporary Chernivtsi province in western Ukraine between the years c. 1780–1940. Moreover, even to this date, Suceava County is one of the Romanian counties with some of the most significant amount of ethnic Germans in the country;
- Zipser Germans, mostly from Maramureş (including Borșa and Vişeu), but also with a smaller presence in southern and south-western Bukovina beginning in the 18th century;
- Regat Germans (including the Dobrujan Germans);
- Bessarabia Germans, Romanian citizens for the period 1918–1940, indigenous to Budjak in southern Bessarabia;
- Black Sea Germans, for a brief period of time during World War II, namely from 1941 to 1944, indigenous to the former Transnistria Governorate and registered in the 1941 Romanian census;
- Alsatians as well as small groups of Walsers vintners who also settled in Banat from Alsace, Lorraine, and Switzerland at the invitation of the Austro-Hungarian Empire in the 19th century (though they were not only Alemannic-speaking Swiss but also French and Italian); Subsequently, these settlers came to be known as 'Français du Banat' (i.e. 'Banat French').

== History ==
=== Settlement during the High Middle Ages ===
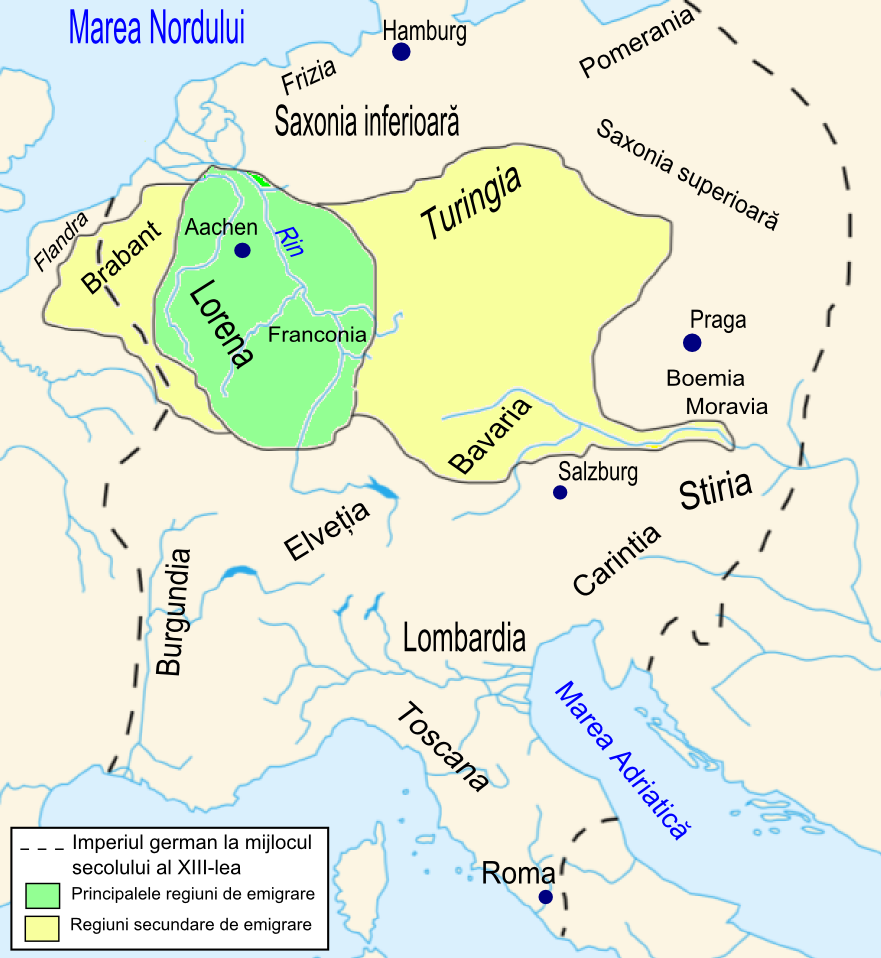
The regions of origin from which the initial waves of Transylvanian Saxons stemmed (the dotted line represents the border of the Holy Roman Empire during the High Middle Ages). Key/Legend: Lorraine - the main region of origin of the initial settlers Brabant, Bavaria, and Thuringia - secondary regions of origin

While an ancient Germanic presence on the territory of present-day Romania can be traced back to late antiquity and is represented by such migratory peoples as the Buri, Vandals, Goths (more specifically Visigoths), or the Gepids, the first waves of ethnic Germans on the territory of modern Romania came during the High Middle Ages, firstly to Transylvania (then part of the Kingdom of Hungary) and then to the neighbouring and emerging medieval principalities of Moldavia and Wallachia. The first major German group to arrive and settle in what is now Romania were the Transylvanian Saxons (German: Siebenbürger Sachsen, Romanian: Sași transilvăneni, Hungarian: erdélyi szászok), partly under the protection of the Teutonic Knights, who came to Transylvania (German: Siebenbürgen, meaning seven cities/citadels, i.e. from the seven fortified medieval cities/citadels which they founded) at the request of Hungarian King Géza II (Hungarian: Géza a második, German: Géza der Zweite, Romanian: Géza al II-lea) during the late 12th century. The main tasks of these settlers was to develop the areas of Transylvania where they settled as well as to defend them, and, implicitly, the rest of the Kingdom of Hungary, from the invading incursions of the migratory Asian peoples such as the Cumans, the Pechenegs, or, ultimately, the Mongols and then the Tatars. Later on, the Transylvanian Saxons further fortified both their rural and urban settlements against the invading Ottoman Empire.

Slowly, the Saxon colonists managed to build stable communities in the Carpathian Basin, more specifically in south-eastern, southern, and north-eastern Transylvania. These Transylvanian Saxons were very tied with their initial origins, which stem from Western Europe, more specifically from Luxembourg and the Rhine-Moselle river valley. Their dialect, Transylvanian Saxon, proves this as it reflects many similarities with Luxembourgish.

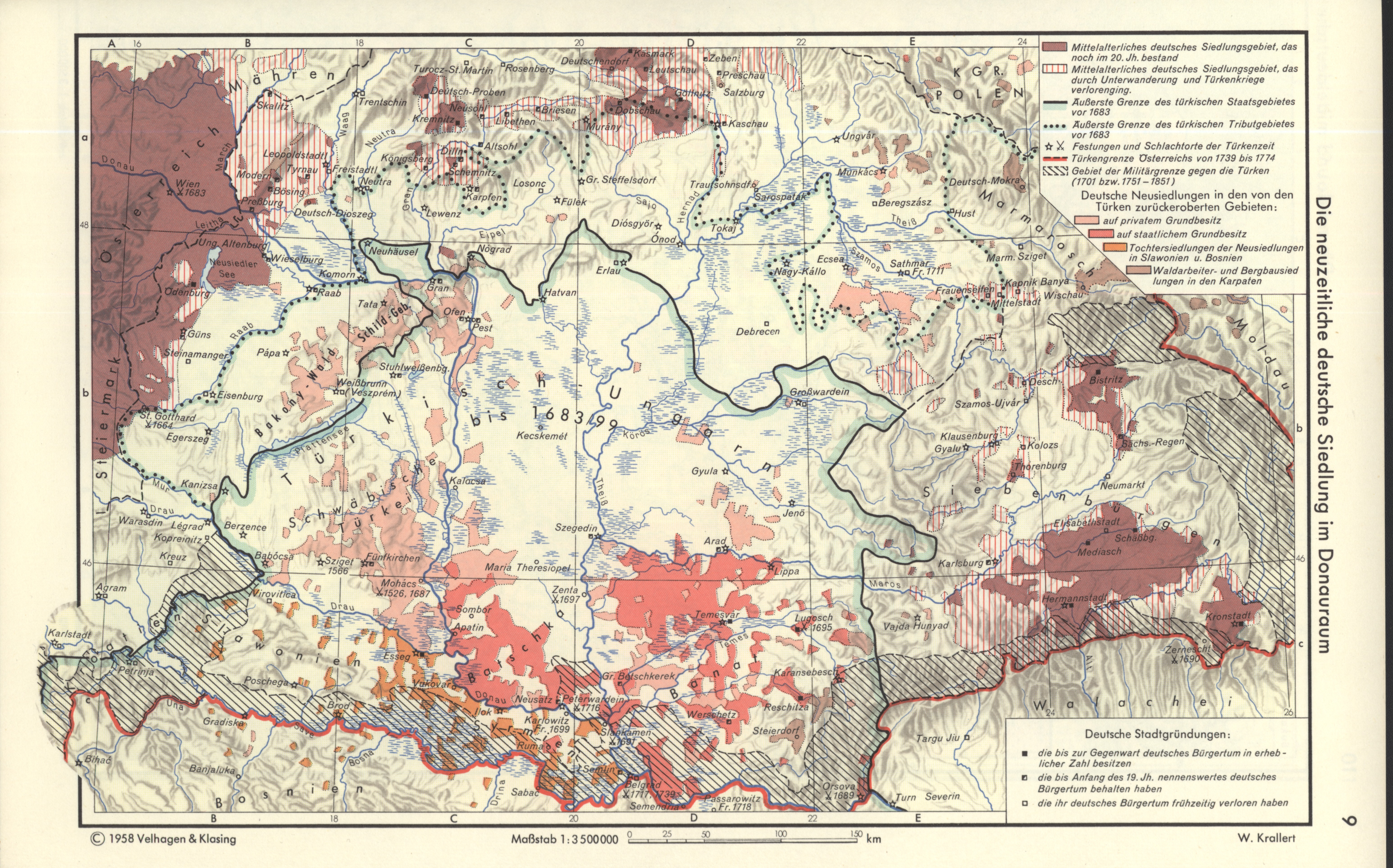
German-language map depicting areas colonised by ethnic Germans in the former Kingdom of Hungary, with Transylvanian Saxons depicted in red-burgundy to the east of the former Hungarian kingdom

Subsequently, as the Teutonic Knights left Transylvania (forced by the Hungarian rulership), the Transylvanian Saxon colonists remained and were given more rights through local autonomies, according to Diploma Andreanum (German: Der Goldener Freibrief der Siebenbürger Sachsen, Romanian: Bula de aur a sașilor transilvani) issued by Andrew II of Hungary in the early 13th century. Their autonomous lands were later known as the 'Royal Lands' or 'Saxon Lands'.

In these lands, they lived together with the Romanian ethnic majority as well as with the Hungarians (who formed a significant minority). Eventually, they also sporadically rebelled against the Hungarian rulership, most notably in the proximity of Rupea (German: Reps, Transylvanian Saxon: Räppes) led by graf (Romanian: greav or grof) Henning of Petersdorf/Petrești in 1324.

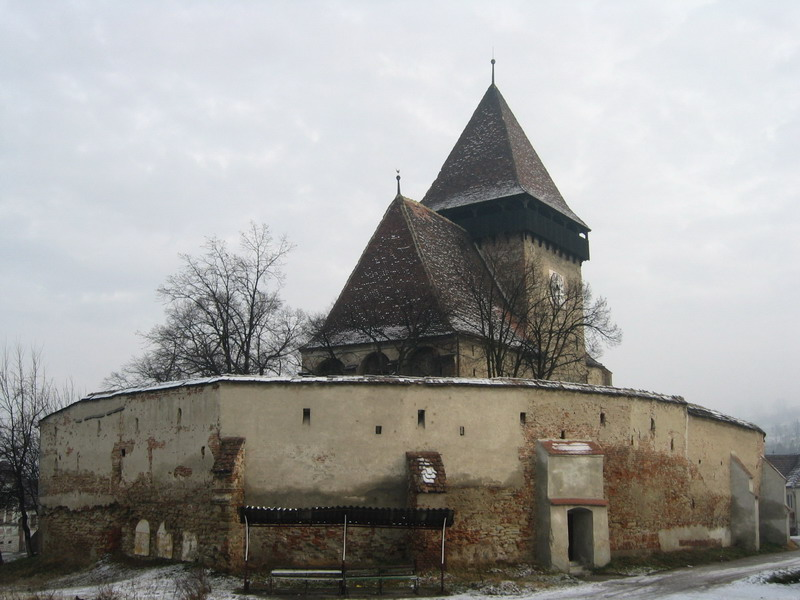
Evangelical Lutheran medieval fortified church in Axente Sever (German: Frauendorf) in Sibiu County (German: Kreis Hermannstadt)

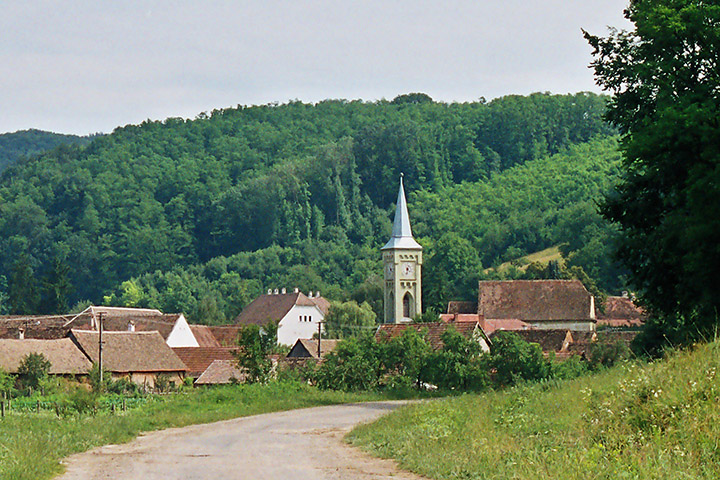
Nemșa (German: Nimesch), a traditional Transylvanian Saxon village pertaining to the larger commune of Moșna (German: Meschen)

Across the Carpathians, the Saxons settled along with the Romanians in Wallachia and Moldavia and contributed to the establishment of the first major urban centres and capitals of these two Romanian medieval principalities. Noteworthy towns and medieval capitals co-founded by Saxons include Baia in present-day Suceava County or Târgu Neamț (German: Niamtz) in Neamț County as well as Târgoviște (German: Tergowisch) in Dâmbovița County or Câmpulung Muscel (German: Langenau) in Argeș County. Here they brought urbanisation and German laws as they did in Suceava as well, in which the local administration had operated for some time under the Magdeburg law, just like Siret (German: Sereth), Baia, or Neamț. They even briefly served as Schultheiß (Romanian: Șoltuz), or the equivalent of the administrative title of medieval mayor in these communities. Nonetheless, along with the passing of time, the Saxons were assimilated in the larger Romanian communities of Romanians, both of the Wallchians and Moldavians.

Back in Transylvania, they managed to thoroughly fortify their villages and towns. In bygone times, there used to be as many as 300 (or approximately 300) villages with fortified churches built by the Transylvanian Saxons. Now their number is close to half, but among these there are many very well preserved ones which are both UNESCO-recognized (as World Heritage Sites) and important tourist destinations in Romania.

The historical coat of arms of the Transylvanian Saxons and of their seven seats

Detailed map depicting the 7 seats (German: Sieben Stühle) of the Transylvanian Saxon lands in Transylvania

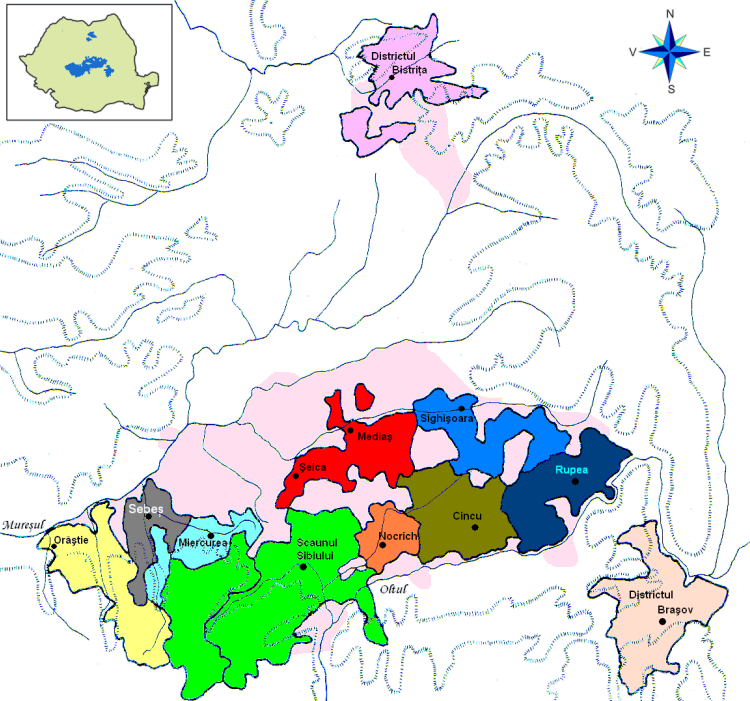
Map depicting the Transylvanian Saxon lands which later constituted the Transylvanian Saxon University in the late 15th century

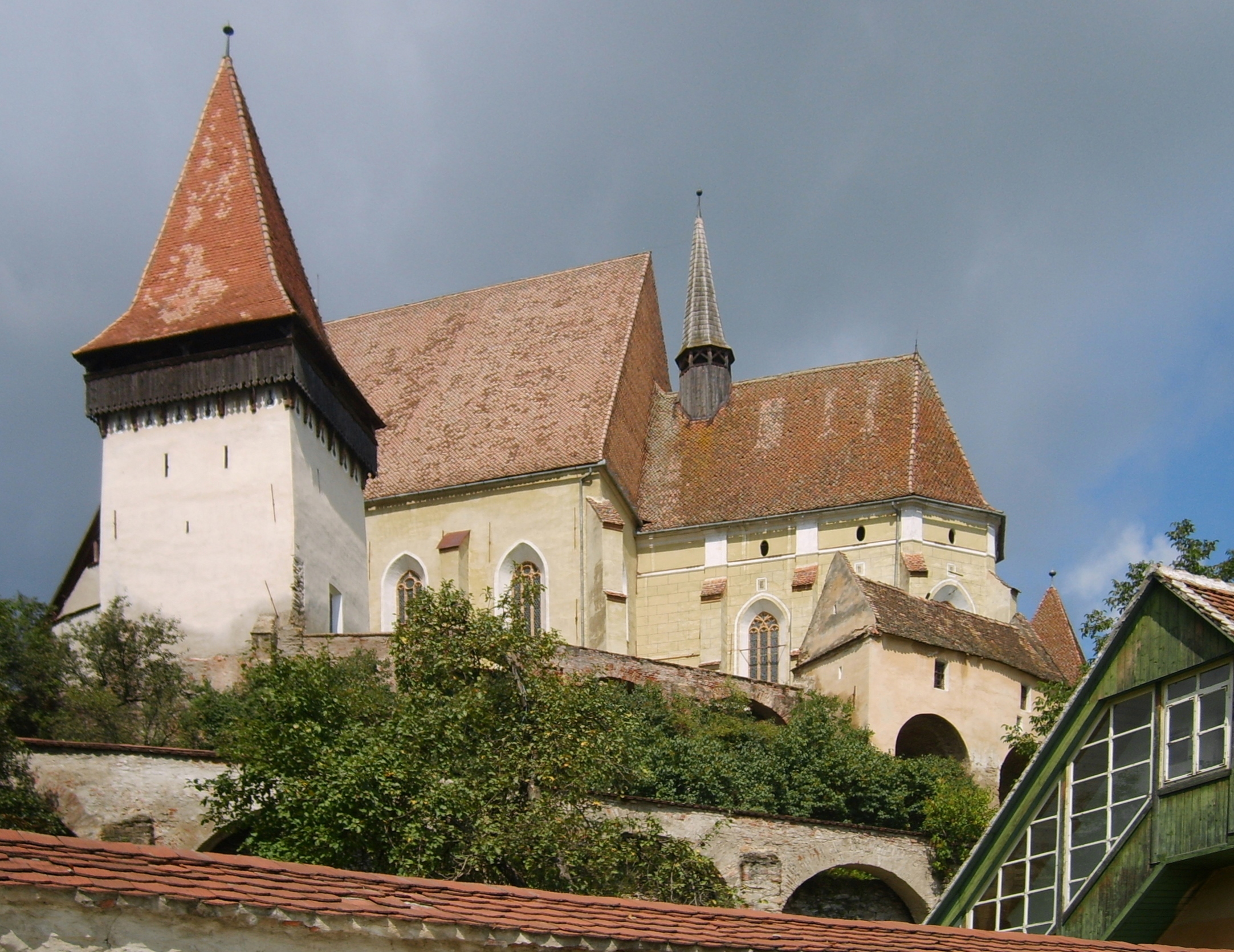
Biertan (German: Birthälm), one of the most important and imposing Evangelical Lutheran fortified churches in Transylvania

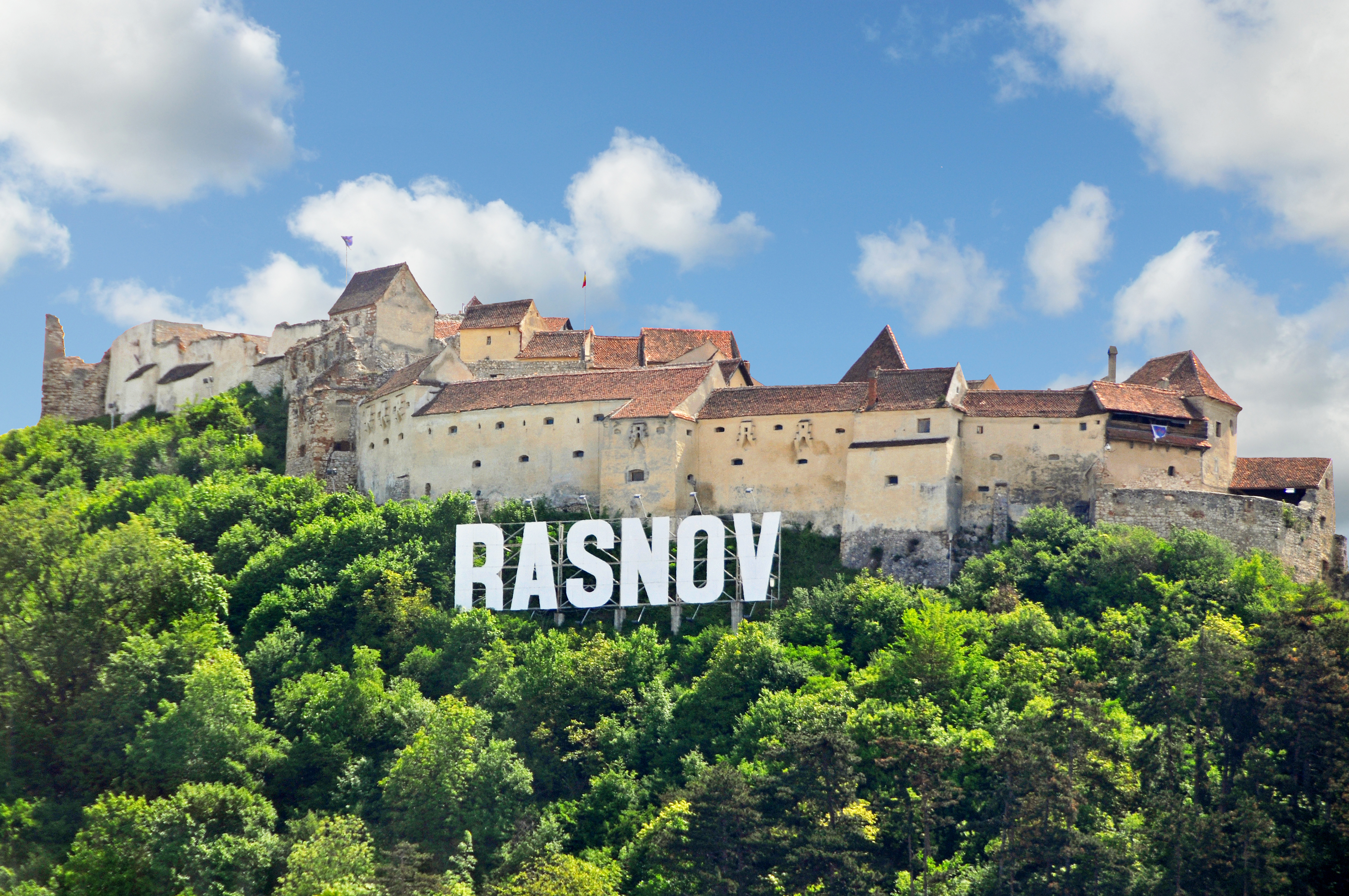
Râșnov (German: Rosenau), a noteworthy example of a well fortified Transylvanian Saxon town

=== Settlement during the Modern Age ===
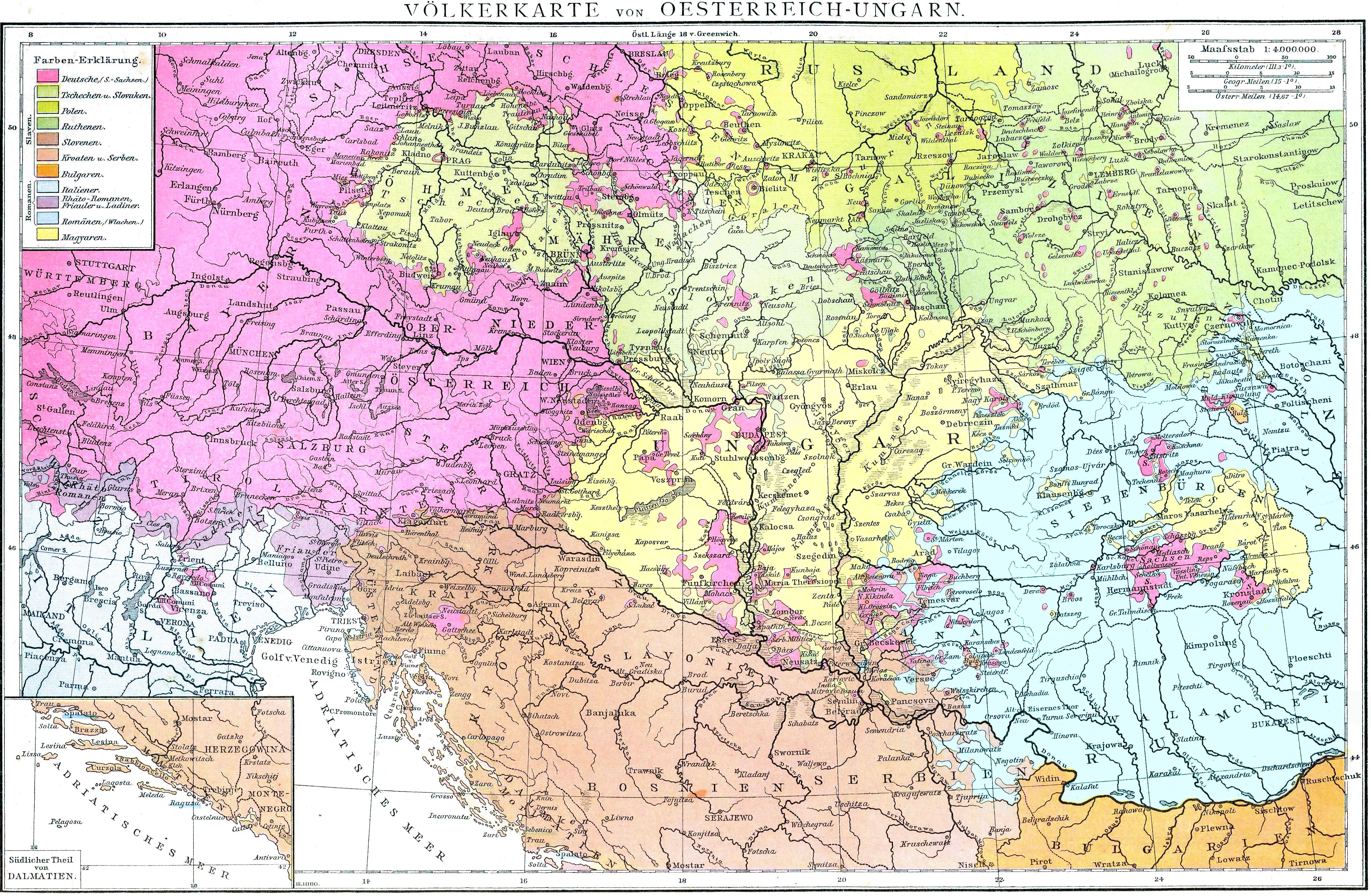
Ethnic Germans living in Austria-Hungary and neighbouring countries (marked in pink), as per the Austro-Hungarian census of 1880.

During the Modern Age, other groups of Germans commenced to arrive and settle parts of contemporary Romania, more specifically in the historical regions of Bukovina, Banat, and once more in Transylvania. As the Kingdom of Hungary became weakened by the Ottoman wars and the Habsburgs were on the rise and continuously expanding their domains eastward, larger groups of Bukovina Germans, Banat Swabians, and Zipser Germans settled the aforementioned Romanian historical regions, mainly for economic and socio-demographic reasons. In Transylvania, other groups of Transylvanian Saxons settled there along with expelled Protestants from Salzkammergut, Austria during Empress Maria Theresa's reign to Sibiu region, Evangelical Lutheran settlers henceforth known as Transylvanian Landlers or, simply, landlers.

At the same time, during the 19th century, in the Romanian Old Kingdom (Romanian: Vechiul regat, German: Altreich), concomitantly with the crowing of King Carol I, a large influx of German settlers came to Muntenia and Oltenia. These Germans are known as Regat Germans. In addition, Germans also settled in Dobruja and this group is known as Dobrujan Germans.

At around the same time, in Bessarabia, then part of the Russian Empire, larger numbers of German settlers established colonies in preponderantly in Budjak (Romanian: Buceag), a constituent historical region of Bessarabia situated in its south towards the Danube's end to the Black Sea. These settlers were requested by the then imperial Russian authorities in order to develop the agriculture of the land and boost the region's economy as well as to instill urbanisation.

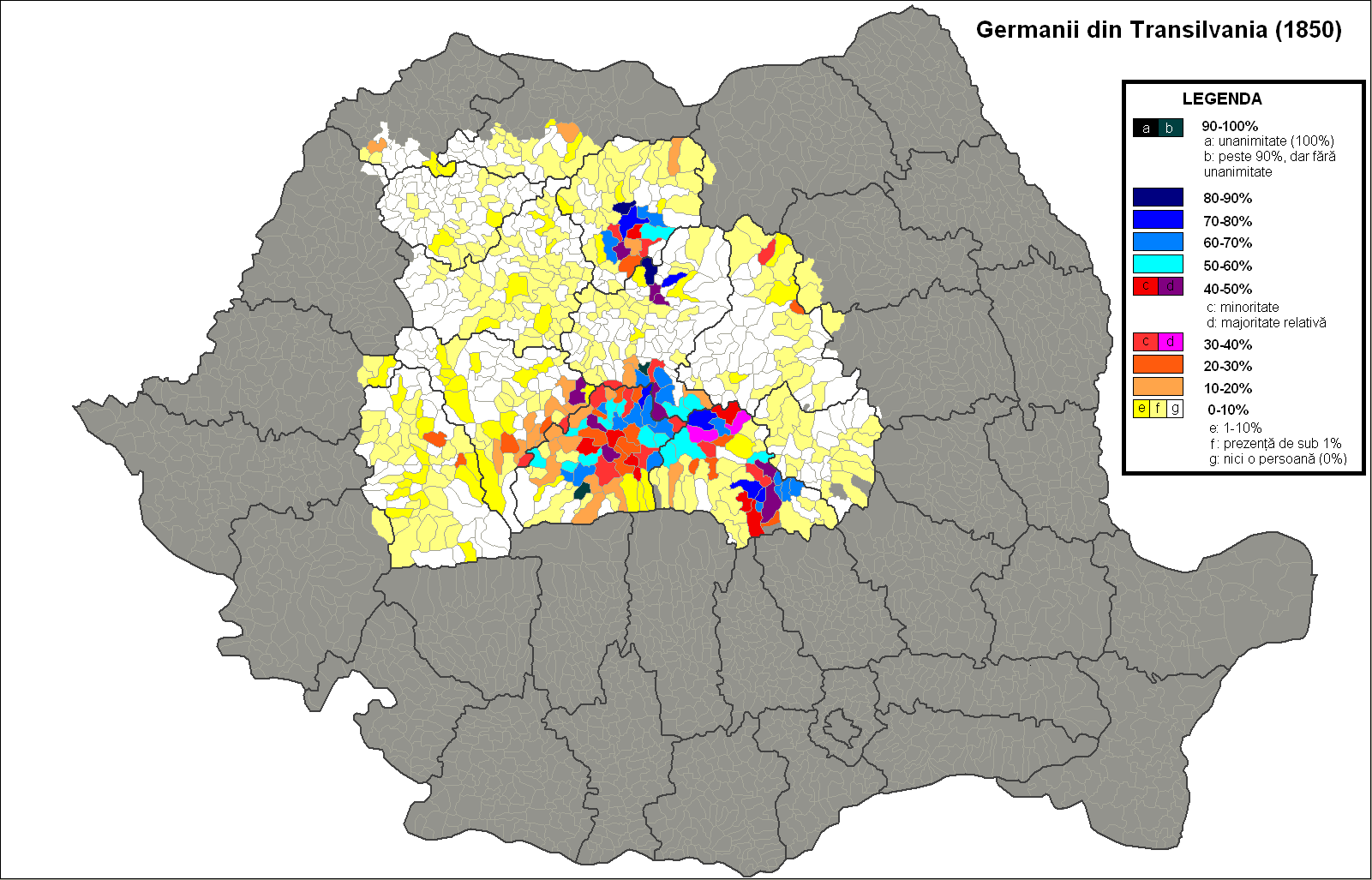
Geographic distribution of Germans in Transylvania in 1850

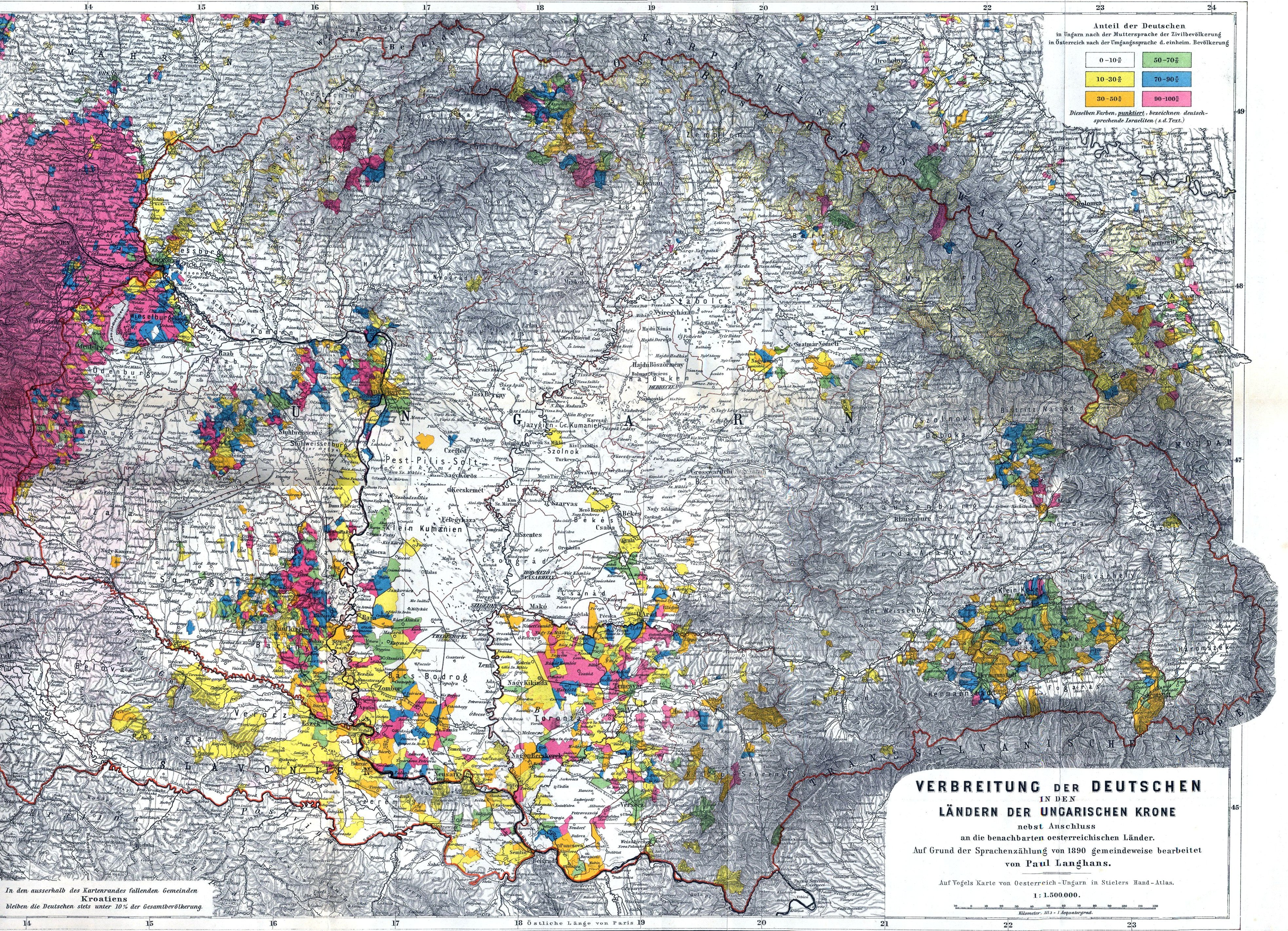
Ethnic Germans living in the former Kingdom of Hungary and other formerly Austrian-ruled regions in 1890

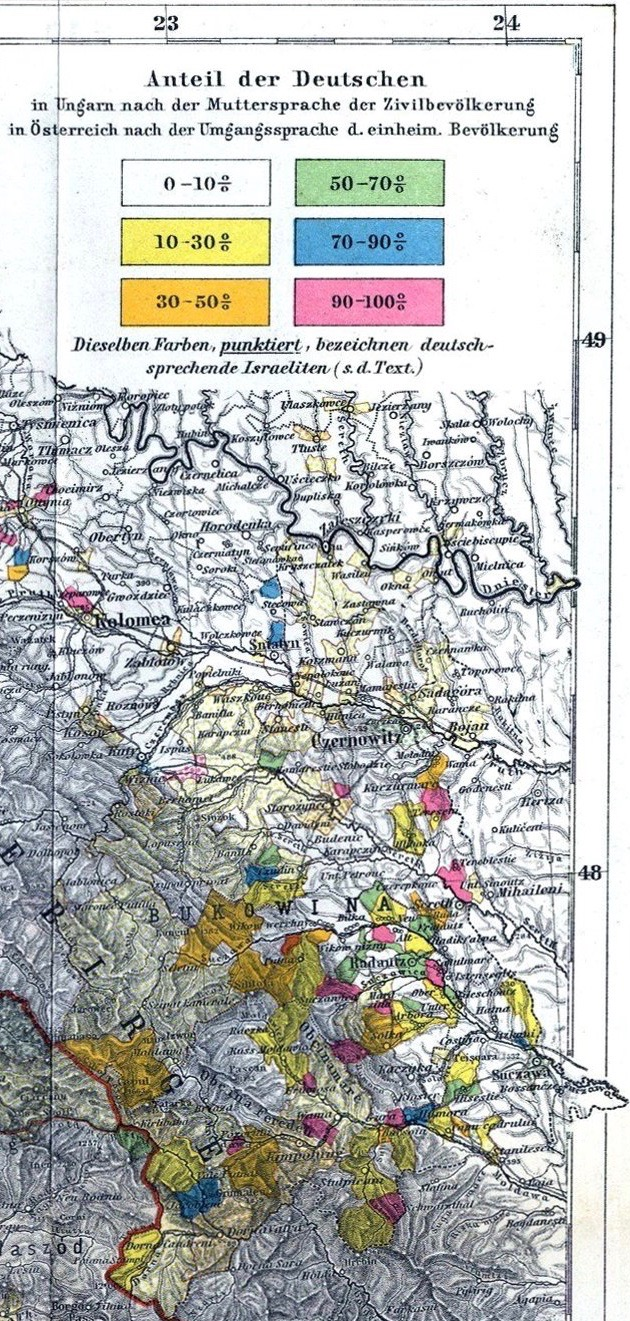
Germans in Bukovina (i.e. Bukovina Germans) according to the 1890 Austrian census

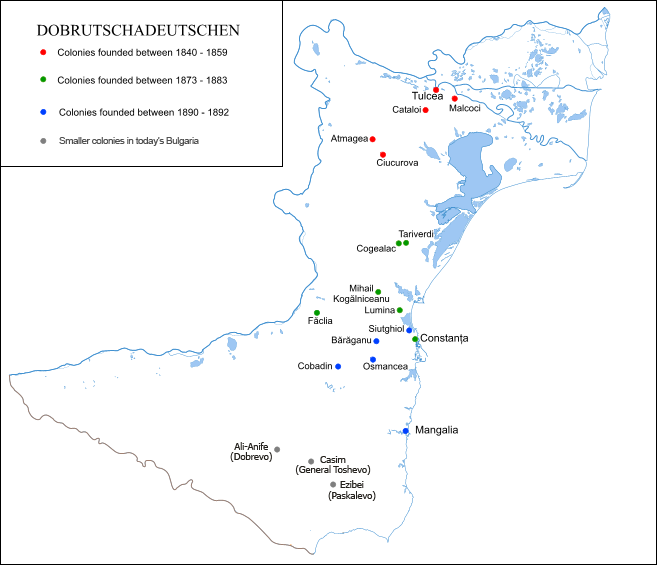
Detailed map depicting the colonies of the Dobrujan Germans in Dobruja (Romanian: Dobrogea)

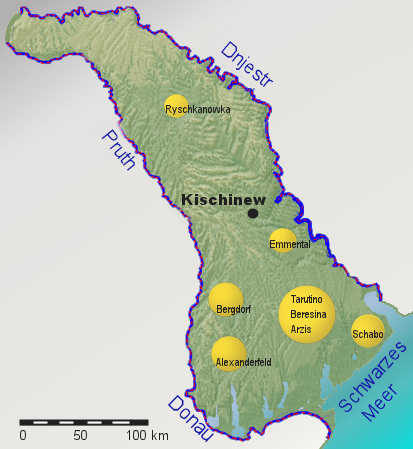
Detailed map depicting the main areas of settlement of the Bessarabia Germans in the former Bessarabia Governorate. There were c. 150 German colonies established in Bessarabia.

As the Modern Age came to an end, gradually so did the privileged class status of the Saxons in Transylvania which eventually drew them closer to Romania and voting the declaration of union of Transylvania with the Kingdom of Romania in the wake of World War I in 1918. Other groups of Germans from other previously Austrian-ruled Romanian historical regions (and the previously Russian-ruled historical region of Bessarabia) also voted for the union of their respective regions with the Kingdom of Romania from a wide variety of reasons. One of the most important reason was that the Romanian monarchy was also German in origin, being a branch of the House of Hohenzollern from the principality of Hohenzollern-Sigmaringen in Swabia.

=== Recent history (20th century onwards) ===
Between the two World Wars, namely in 1925, c. 20,000 Swabians from Timiș County were relocated to neighbouring Arad County in order to create an ethnic balance in the latter administrative unit. Before and during World War II, their organization Deutsche Voksgruppe in Rumänien actively supported Nazi Germany. Subsequently, huge numbers of both Transylvanian Saxons and Banat Swabians (ranging between c. 67,000 to 89,000 in total) were deported to the Soviet Union for forced labour after World War II, as a war compensation to the Soviets, despite the diplomatic efforts of Transylvanian Saxon politician Hans Otto Roth. Later during the 1950s, the Bărăgan deportations forcibly relocated many from near the Yugoslav border to the Bărăgan Plain. Survivors of both groups generally returned, but had often lost their properties in the process.

Germans in Transylvania in 1918 (the Saxons are marked with green-coloured text whereas the Swabians with cyan-coloured text)

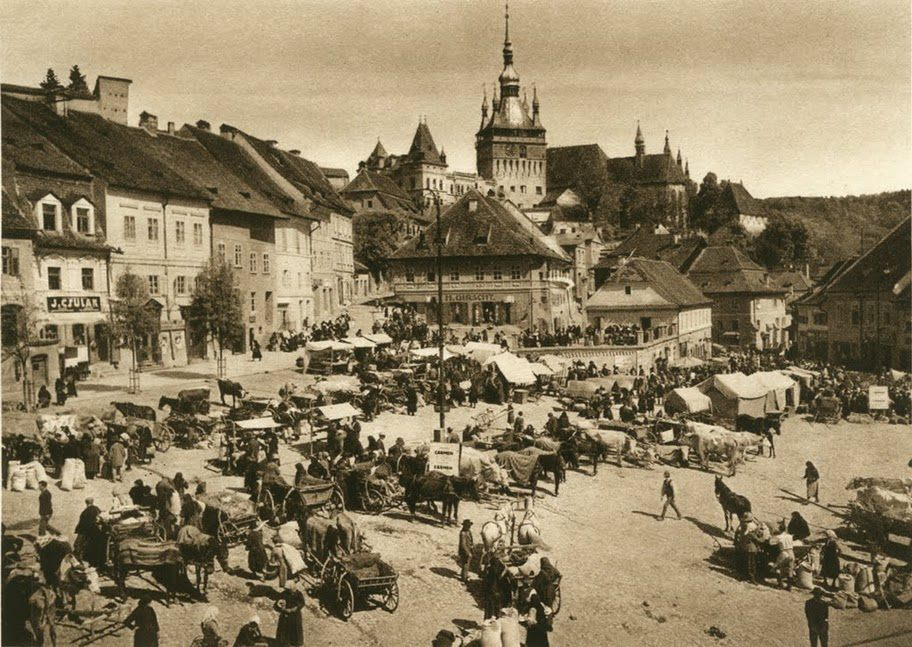
Central Sighișoara (German: Schäßburg) by German photographer Kurt Hielscher in 1933

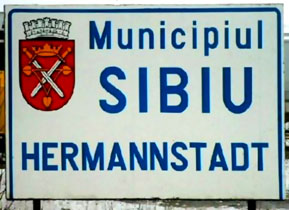
Romanian-German bilingual sign at the entrance in Sibiu (German: Hermannstadt)

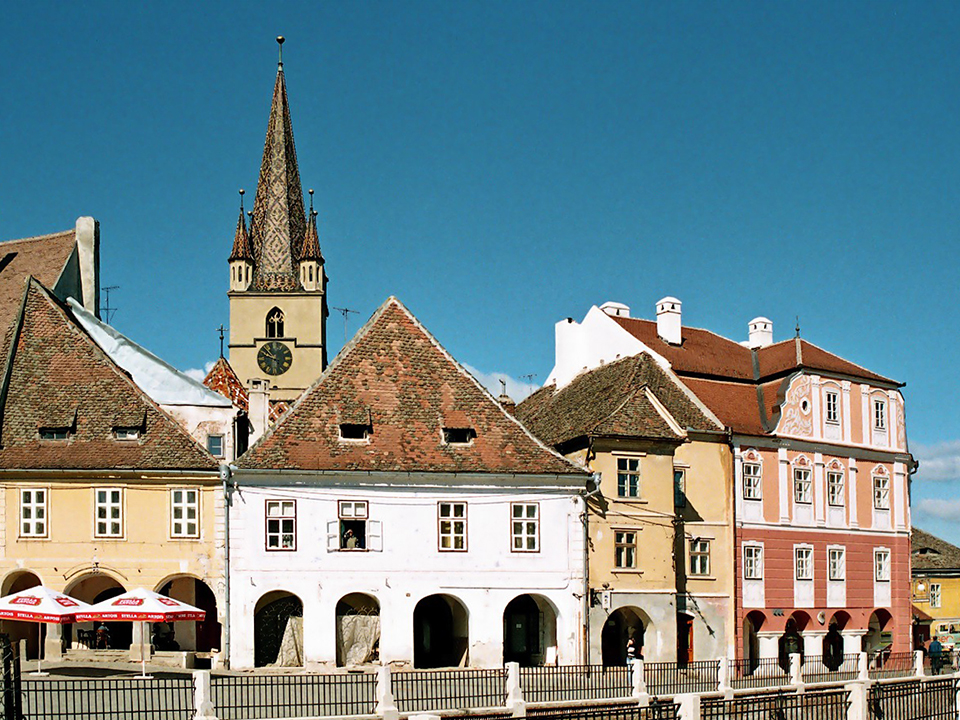
The Small Square (German: Der kleine Ring, Romanian: Piața Mică) in Sibiu (German: Hermannstadt)

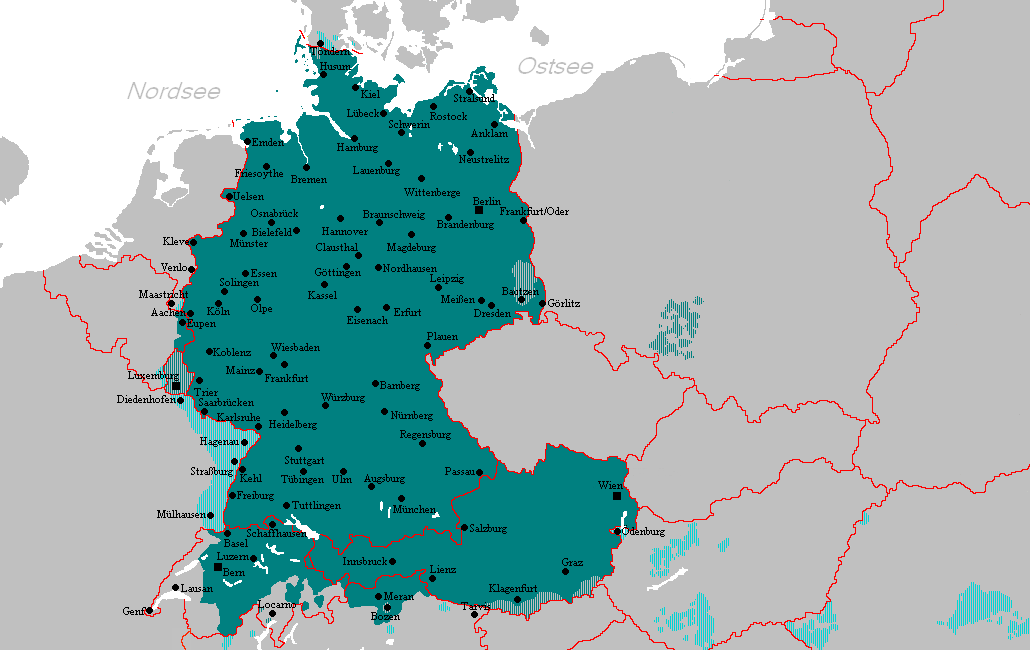
The geographical extent of the German language, also highlighting German-speaking minority communities in central, south-western, and north-western Romania

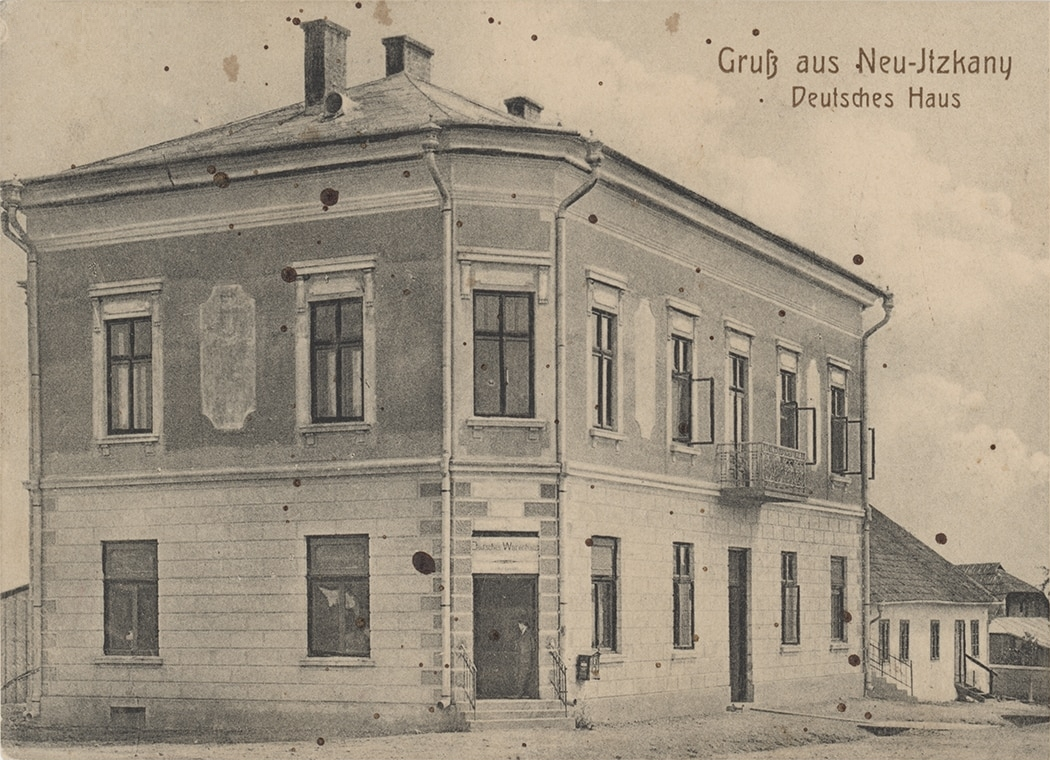
The German House in Neu-Itzkany, nowadays Ițcani, a neighbourhood of Suceava, Bukovina, northeastern Romania

In addition, the once influential Bukovina German community also drastically dwindled in numbers, primarily as of the cause of the Heim ins Reich population transfer, leaving only several thousands of ethnic Germans in southern Bukovina (or present-day Suceava County) after the end of World War II. As communism paved its way in Romania, most of the remaining Bukovina Germans decided to gradually leave the country for West Germany up until 1989 (and even beyond), as it was the case of the entire German community of the country for that matter.

Furthermore, during the 1970s and 1980s, tens of thousands of other Romanian-Germans were 'bought back' by the West German government under a program to reunite families - and following the collapse of Nicolae Ceaușescu's regime in December 1989, around 200,000 Germans left their homes in Romania. During communist times, there have been several significant German-speaking opposition groups to the Romanian communist state, among which most notably there was Aktionsgruppe Banat, a literary society constituted in Banat by intellectual representatives of the local Swabian community (including, most notably, writer Richard Wagner). Overall, regarding the many Germans which were bought per capita by the West German government, the communist Romanian state was quite greedy in requesting more German marks for them, as in the words of former German chancellor Helmut Kohl, also former leader of the Christian Democratic Union (CDU).

==== Recent developments (late 20th century and 21st century onwards) ====
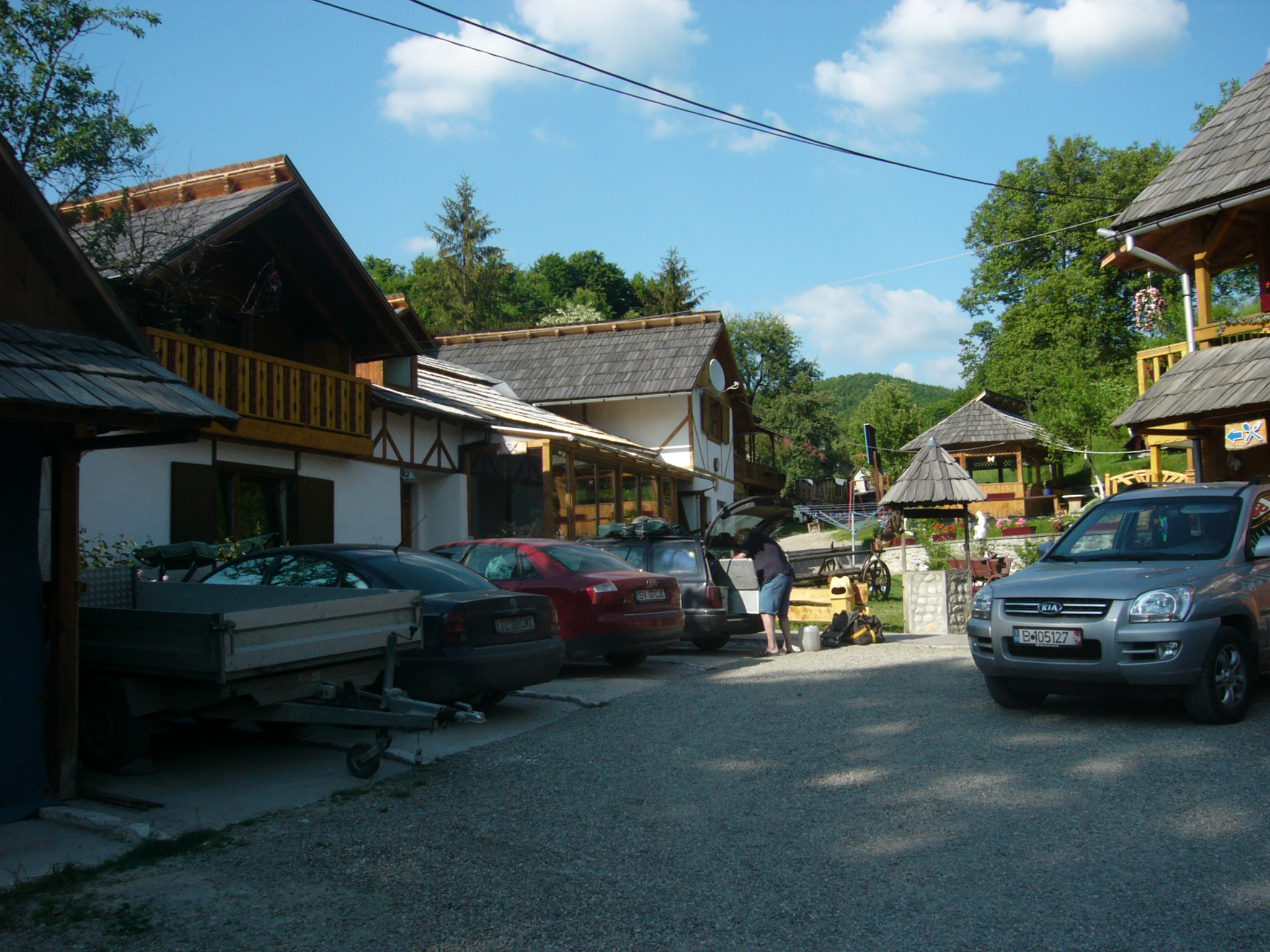
Țipțerai neighbourhood in the small town of Vișeu de Sus (German: Oberwischau), Maramureș County, still inahbited by a small community of Zipser Germans according to the 2011 Romanian census

The German minority in Romania has shrunk considerably since the fall of the Iron Curtain. The Romanian-Germans who remained after the 1989 revolution have contributed to the culture and history of Transylvania, Banat and Bukovina, where the largest German-speaking groups once lived alongside the Romanian majority. Klaus Iohannis has said that the Germans of Romania are "appreciated and respected by all Romanians".

Furthermore, the bilateral political and cultural relationships between post–1989 Romania and the unified Federal Republic of Germany have seen a continuous positive evolution since the signing of a friendship treaty between the two countries in 1992. Additionally, on the occasion of the election of Frank-Walter Steinmeier as President of Germany in 2017, former Romanian president Klaus Johannis stated, among others, that: "[...] Last but not least, there is a profound friendship bounding the Romanians and the Germans, thanks mainly to the centuries-long cohabitation between the Romanians, Saxons, and Swabians in Transylvania, Banat, and Bukovina."

== Contributions to Romanian culture ==
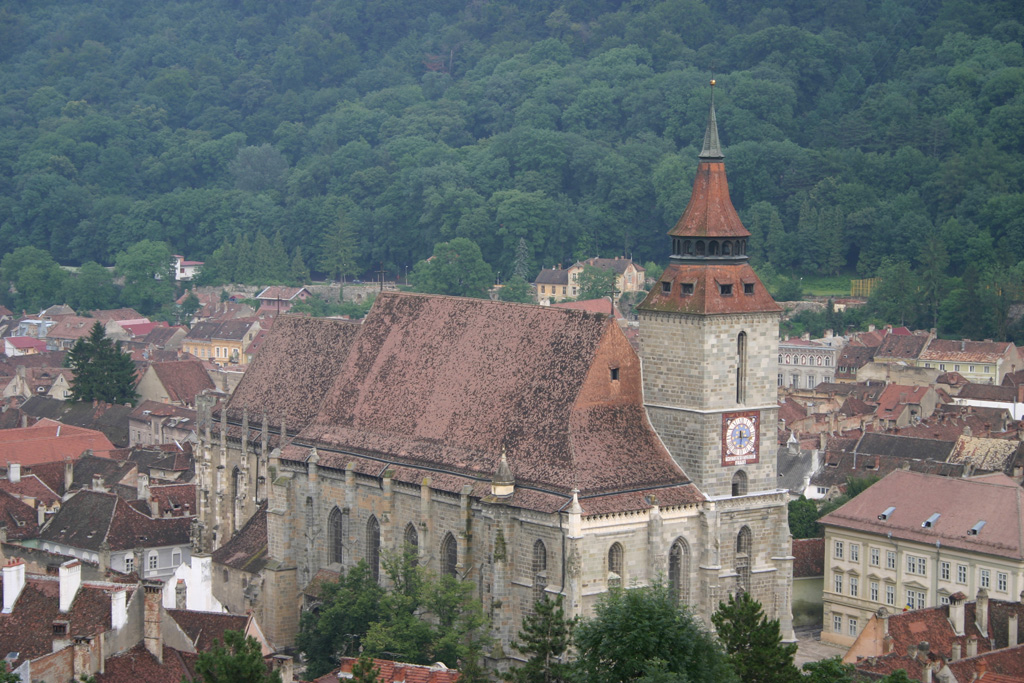
The Black Church (German: Die Schwarze Kirche, Romanian: Biserica Neagră) in Brașov (German: Kronstadt), a representative landmark of the German community in Romania

The German community in Romania has been actively and consistently contributing to the culture of the country. Notable examples include:

- Romanian architecture (e.g. the picturesque Transylvanian villages with fortified churches, known in German as kirchenburgen), or some of the most renowned castles as well as several medieval town centers with local markets, all of them highly popular touristic attractions);
- Romanian language (where approximately 3% of the words in the Romanian lexis are of German origin, mainly stemming from the influence of the Transylvanian Saxons and, later on, that of Austrians);
- Romanian literature (the first letter written in Romanian was addressed to the former early 16th century mayor of Kronstadt, Johannes Benkner, and the first Romanian-language book was printed in Sibiu (German: Hermannstadt);
- The collections of Ottoman rugs kept in Transylvania inside several fortified churches (known as Transylvanian rugs) are associated with the Transylvanian Saxon Lutherans.

== Royal House of Hohenzollern-Sigmaringen ==
In the time of Romania's transition from a middle-sized principality to a larger kingdom, members of the German House of Hohenzollern (stemming from the Swabian Principality of Hohenzollern-Sigmaringen, part of contemporary Baden-Württemberg in south-western Germany) reigned initially over the Danubian United Principalities of Moldavia and Wallachia and then, eventually, also over the unified Kingdom of Romania both during the 19th and 20th centuries.

== Demographics ==
Historical population
Year	Pop.	±%
1887	50,000	—
1930	745,421	+1390.8%
1939	786,000	+5.4%
1941 (Note: April)	542,325	−31.0%
1941 (Note: December)	674,307	+24.3%
1948	343,913	−49.0%
1956	384,708	+11.9%
1966	382,595	−0.5%
1977	359,109	−6.1%
1992	119,462	−66.7%
2002	59,764	−50.0%
2011	36,042	−39.7%
2022	22,907	−36.4%
Starting with the 1930 figures, the reference is to all German-speaking groups in Romania.

=== Comparative demographic table (1930–2011) ===
The demographic evolution of the German population in Romania during the 20th and early 21st century by ethnic sub-group
German ethnic sub-group	1930	1977	2002	2011
Transylvanian Saxons	230,000	170,000	18,000	13,000
Bukovina Germans	75,533	2,265	1,773	717
Banat Swabians	237,000	138,000	19,000	—N/a
Banat Highland Germans (Note: Can be equally considered as part of the broader Banat Swabian community.)	37,000	22,000	6,000	—N/a
Sathmar Swabians	27,000	8,000	6,000	—N/a
Transylvanian Landler (Note: Can be somewhat considered as part of the Transylvanian Saxon community, at least in religious terms, being also Evangelical Lutheran.)	6,000	4,000	250	—N/a
Regat Germans	32,226	—N/a	—N/a	—N/a
Dobrujan Germans	12,581	—N/a	—N/a	—N/a
Bessarabia Germans	81,000	—N/a	—N/a	—N/a

=== 1941 Romanian censuses ===
In 1941, the initial number of all ethnic Germans in Romania amounted to as much as 542,325. Subsequently, however, in December 1941, after Romania created, incorporated, and administered the Transnistria Governorate, the total number of ethnic Germans increased to 674,307, most notably along with the then newly registered Black Sea Germans, solely for the short period between 1941 and 1944. It is also important to note the fact that the Germans constituted the second most numerous ethnic group in Romania at that time, after the Romanians, accounting for 4.01% (in April) respectively 3.53% (in December) of the total population.

=== Population statistics by settlement (2011) ===
The data displayed in the table below highlights notable settlements (of at least 1%) of the German minority in Romania according to the 2011 Romanian census. Note that some particular figures might represent a rough estimate.

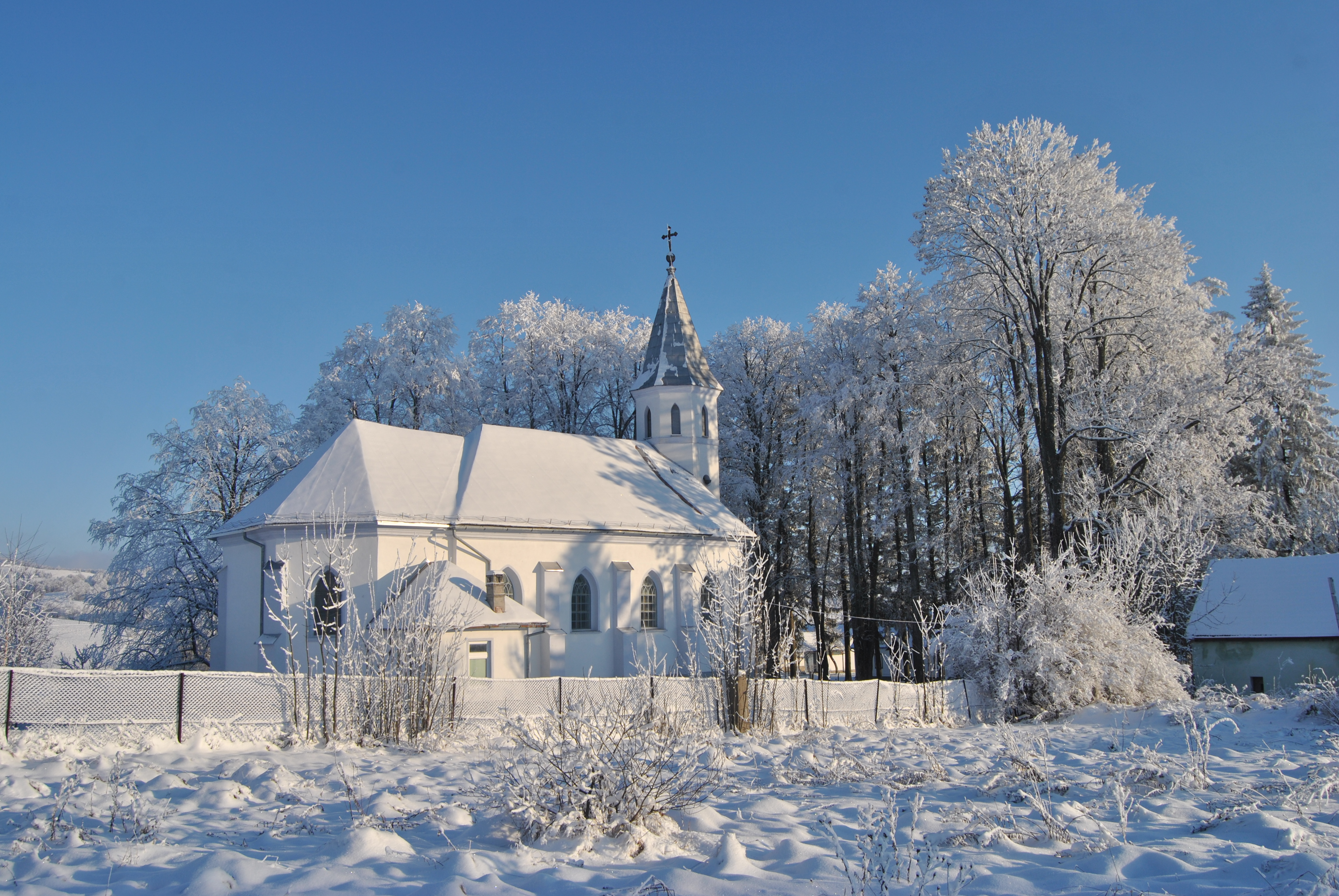
Brebu Nou (German: Weidenthal), Caraș-Severin County, Banat

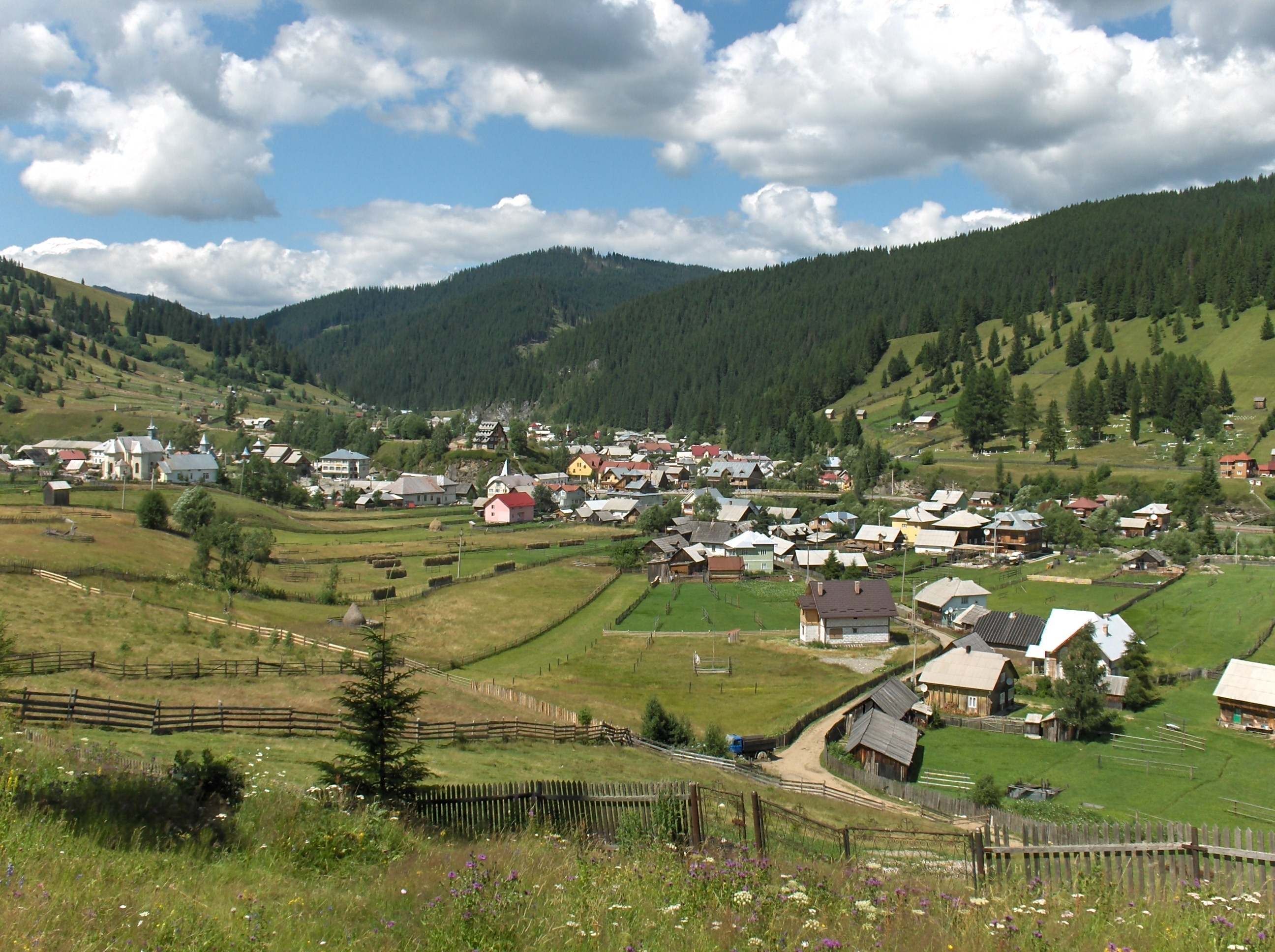
Cârlibaba (German: Mariensee or Ludwigsdorf), Suceava County, Bukovina

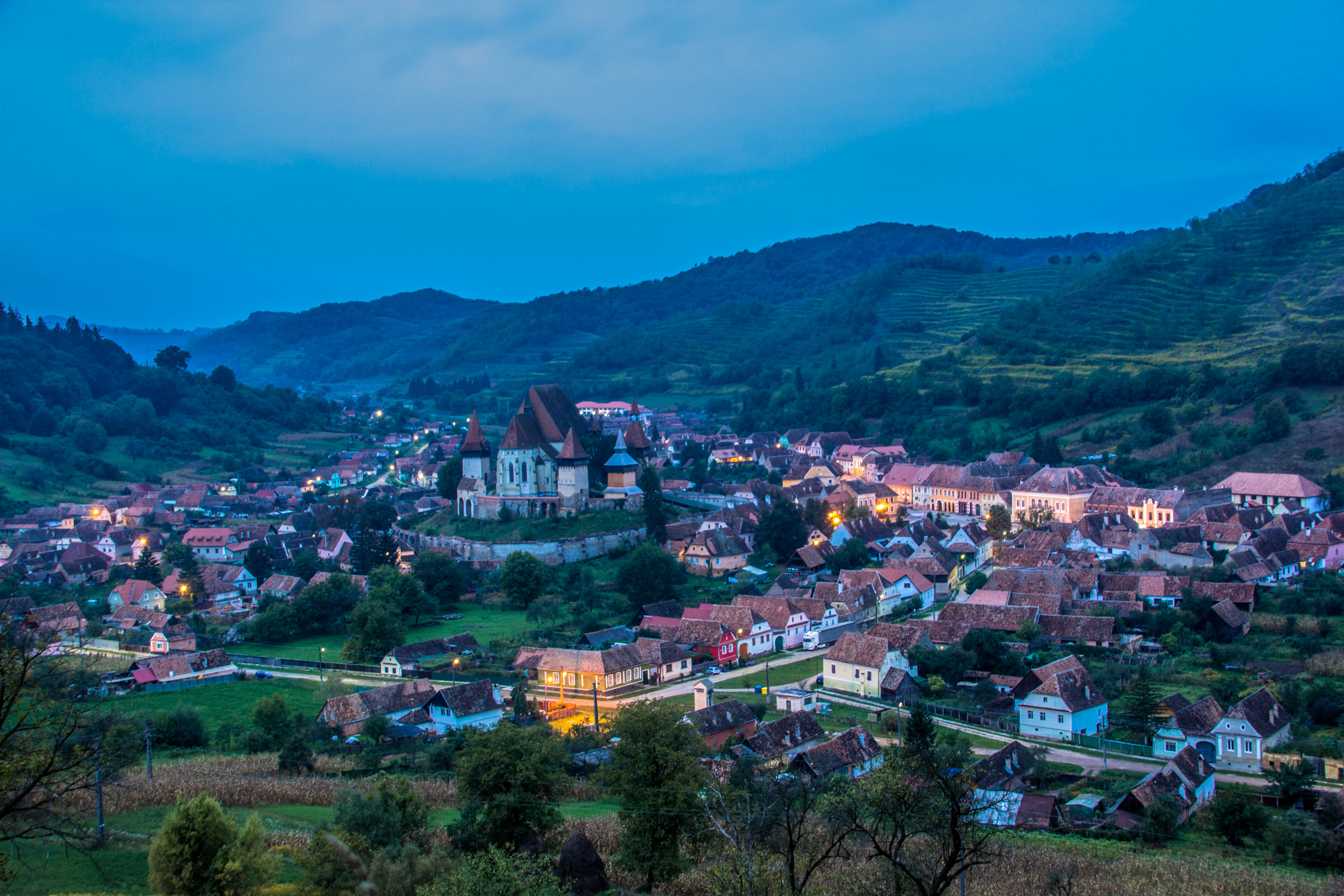
Biertan (German: Birthälm), Sibiu County, Transylvania

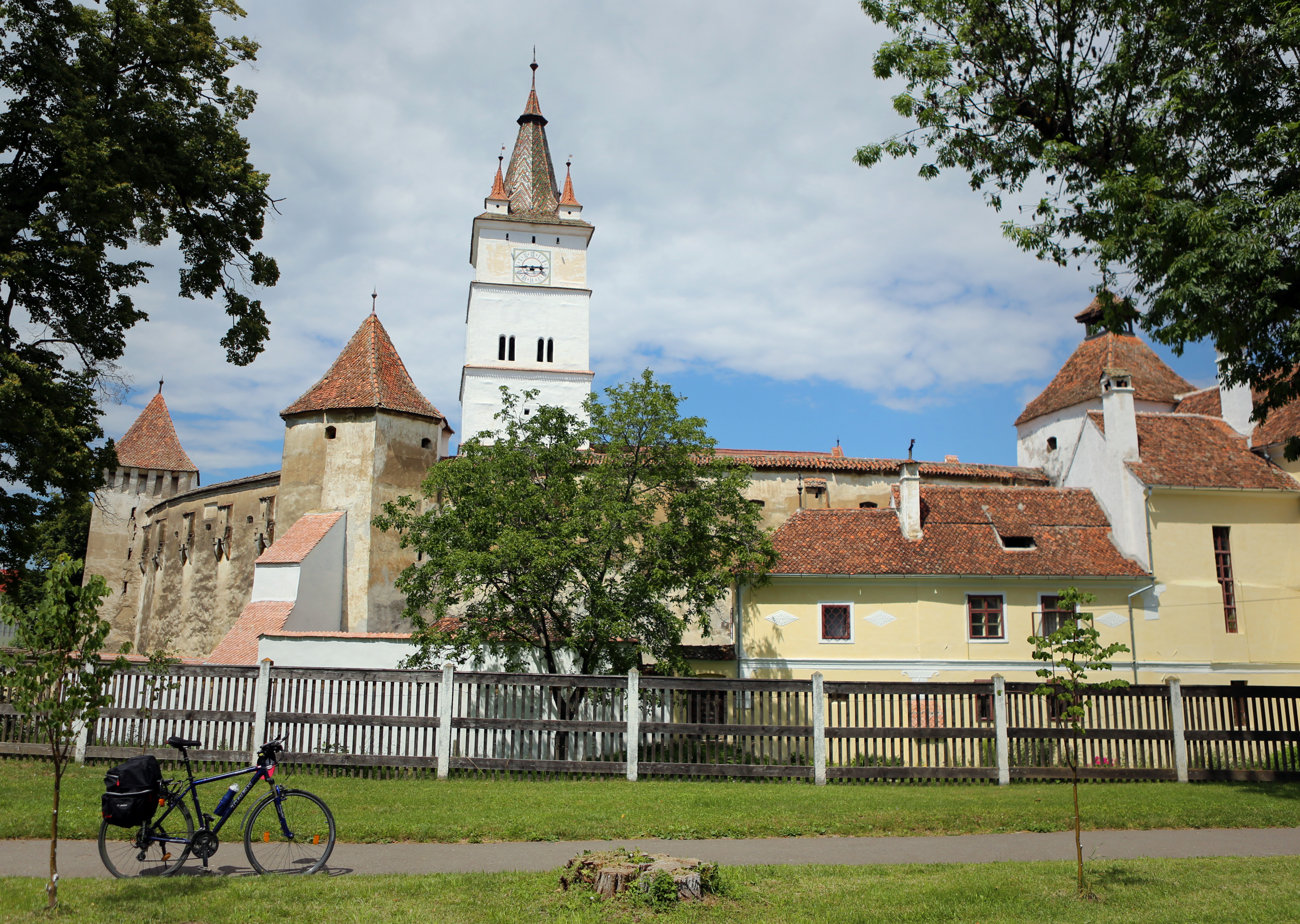
Hărman (German: Honigberg), Brașov County, Transylvania

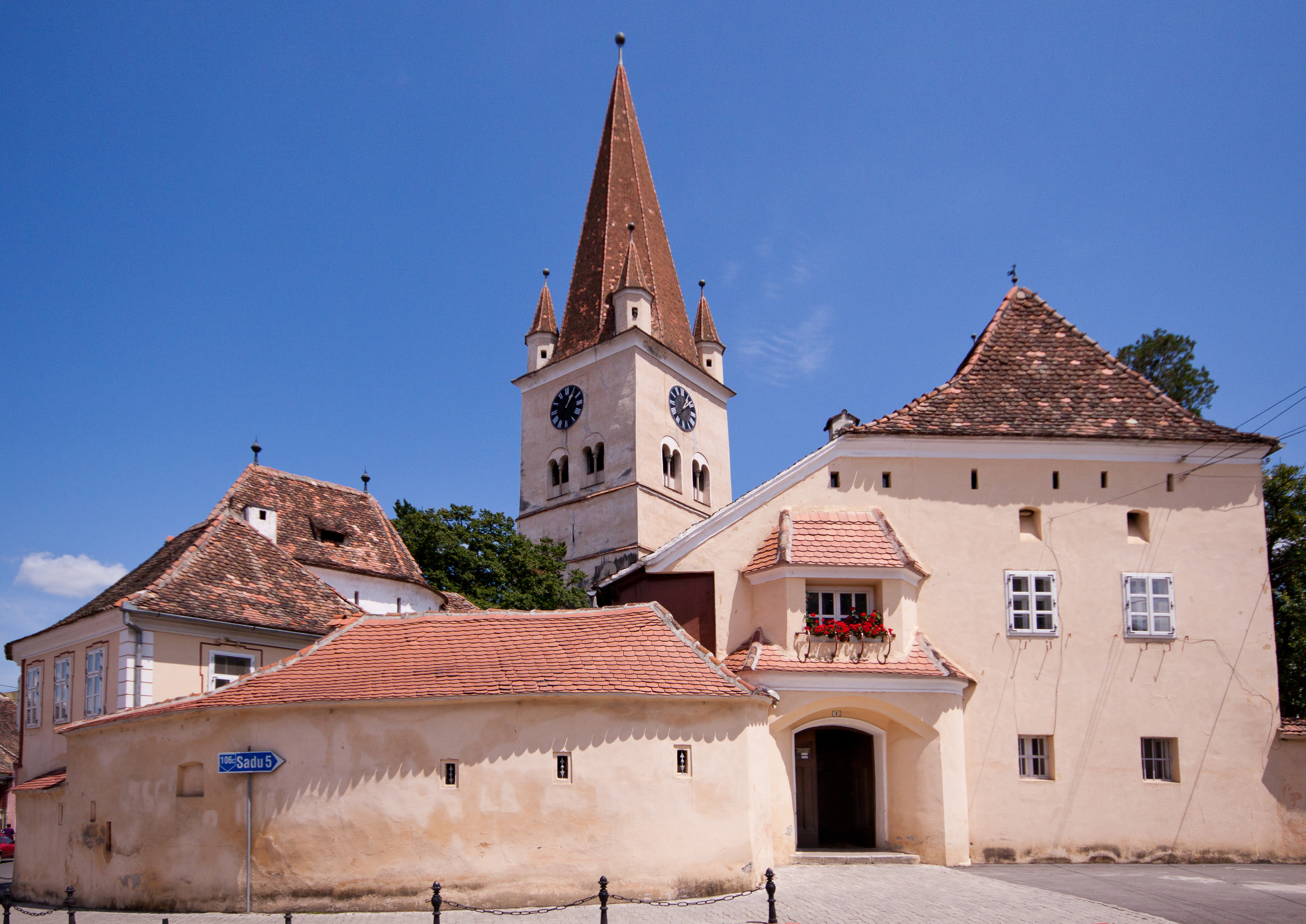
Cisnădie (German: Heltau), Sibiu County, Transylvania

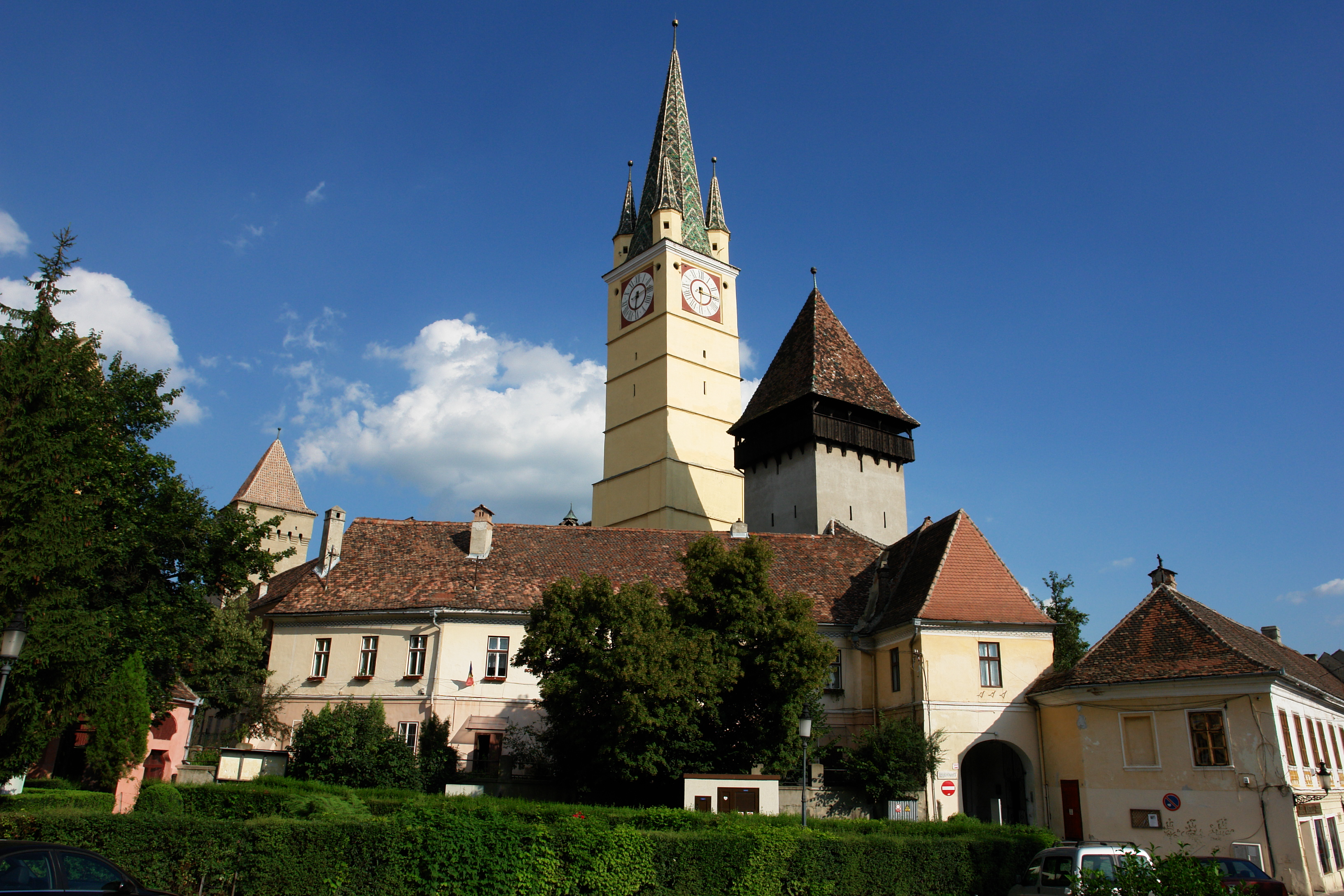
Mediaș (German: Mediasch), Sibiu County, Transylvania

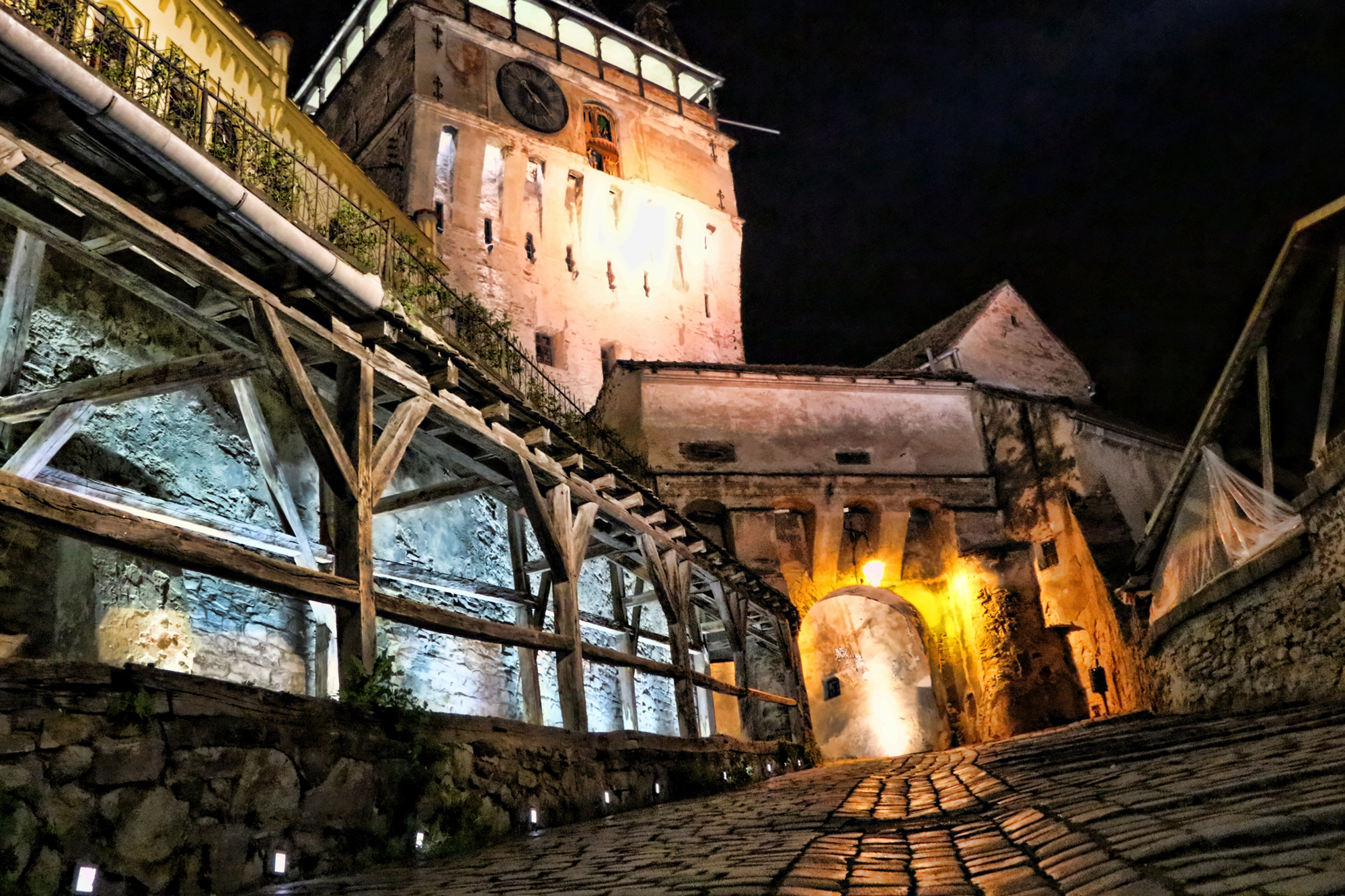
Sighișoara (German: Schäßburg), Mureș County, Transylvania

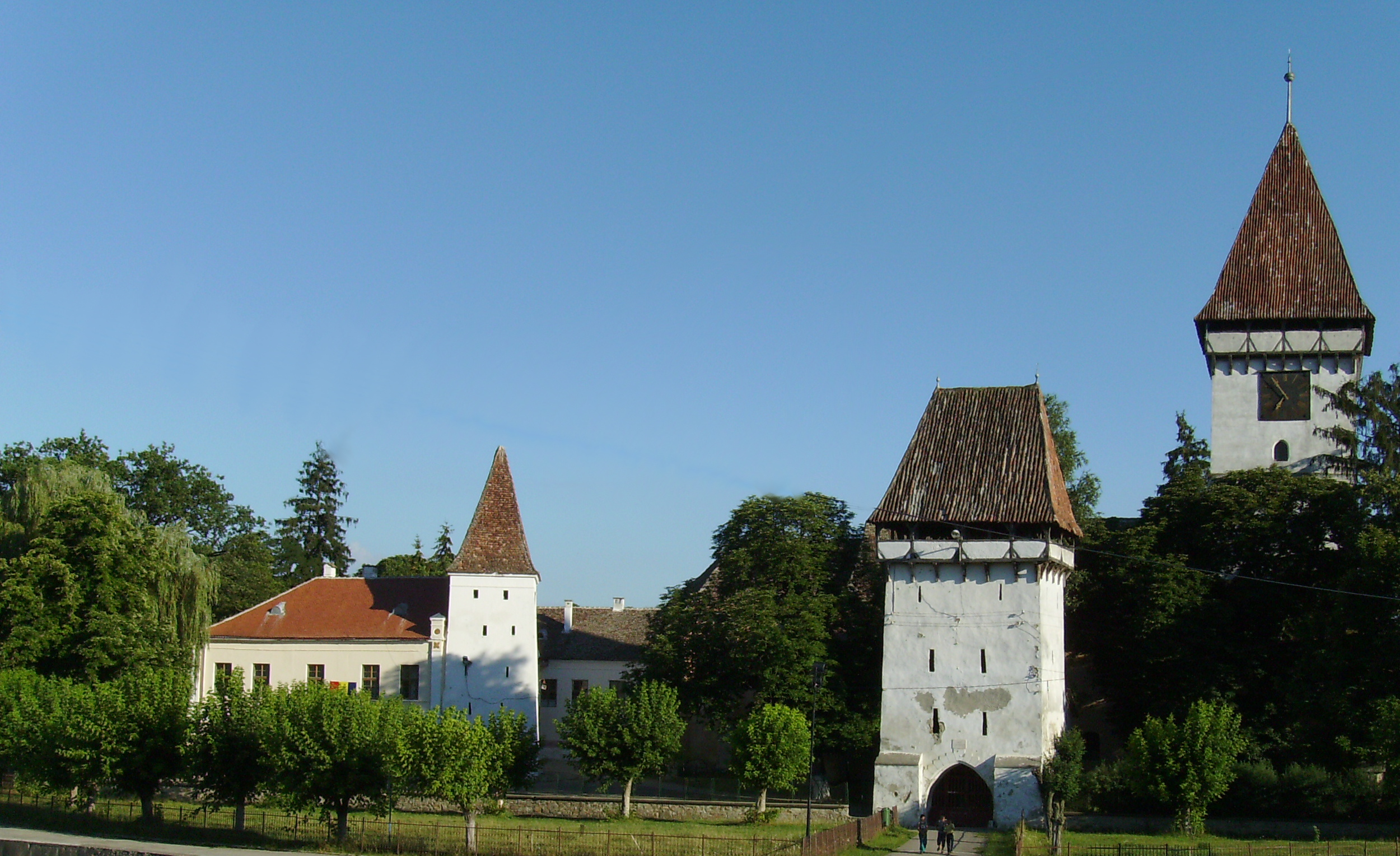
Agnita (German: Agnetheln), Sibiu County, Transylvania

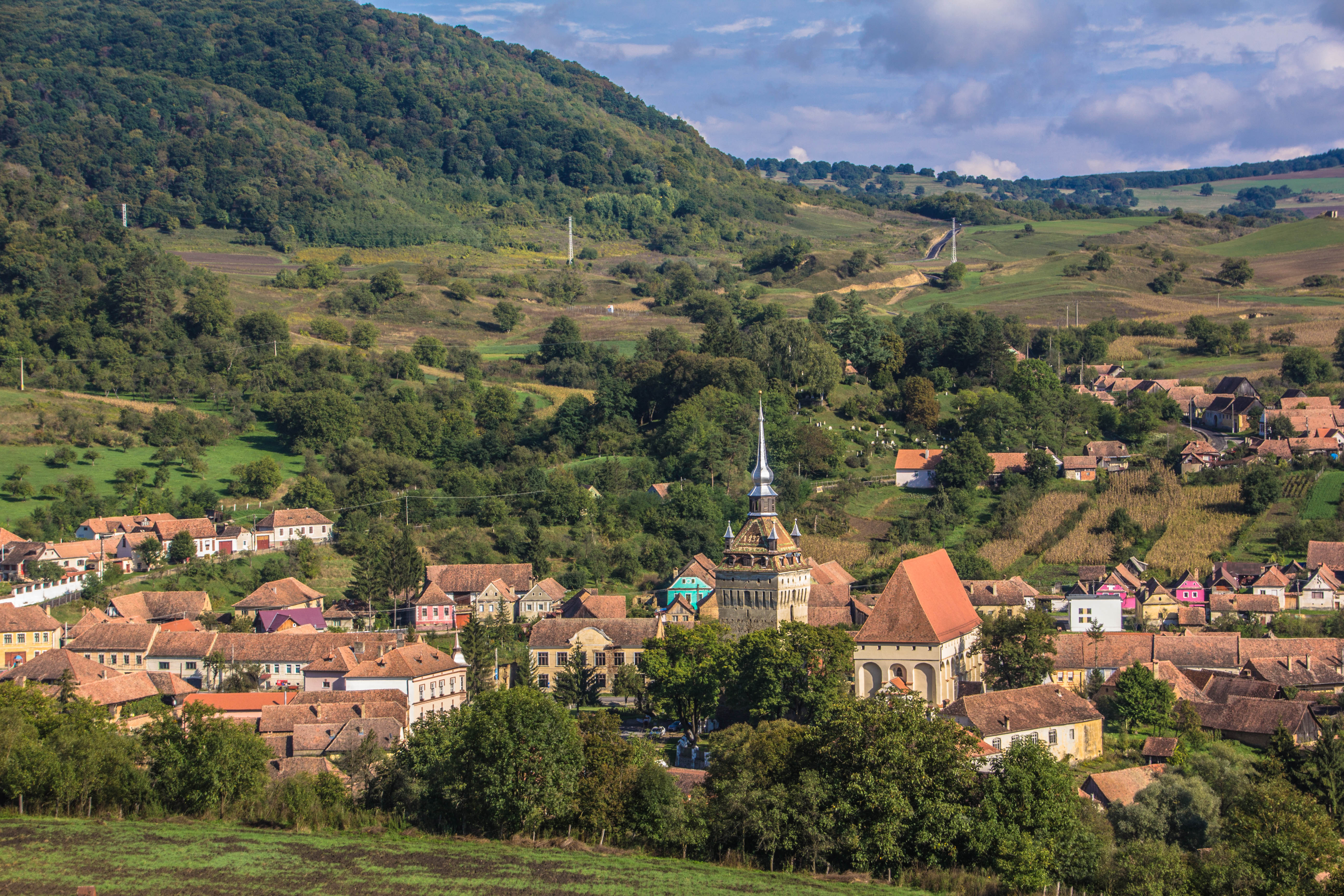
Saschiz (German: Keisd or Hünenburg), Mureș County, example of a typical rural fortified Transylvanian Saxon settlement

German minority population by settlement (Source: 2011 Romanian census)
Romanian name	German name	Percent	County
Brebu Nou	Weidenthal	30.2	Caraș-Severin
Petrești	Petrifeld	27.8	Satu Mare
Urziceni	Schinal	23.9	Satu Mare
Cămin	Kalmandi	22.5	Satu Mare
Beltiug	Bildegg	11.4	Satu Mare
Tiream	Terem	10.9	Satu Mare
Laslea	Grosslasseln	7.5	Sibiu
Anina	Steierdorf	5.6	Caraș-Severin
Ațel	Hatzeldorf	5.3	Sibiu
Cârlibaba	Mariensee/Ludwigsdorf; Kirlibaba	5.1	Suceava
Saschiz	Keisd	5.0	Mureș
Biertan	Birthälm	4.6	Sibiu
Ardud	Erdeed	4.5	Satu Mare
Vișeu de Sus	Oberwischau	4.0	Maramureș
Deta	Detta	4.0	Timiș
Tomnatic	Triebswetter	3.9	Timiș
Semlac	Semlak	3.6	Arad
Peregu Mare	Deutschpereg	3.5	Arad
Sântana	Sanktanna	2.9	Arad
Jimbolia	Hatzfeld	2.9	Timiș
Jibert	Seiburg	2.8	Brașov
Măieruş	Nussbach	2.6	Brașov
Căpleni	Kaplau	2.4	Satu Mare
Lovrin	Lowrin	2.3	Timiș
Carei	Grosskarol	2.3	Satu Mare
Parța	Paratz	2.1	Timiș
Buziaș	Busiasch	2.1	Timiș
Periam	Perjamosch	2.1	Timiș
Sânnicolau Mare	Grosssanktnikolaus	2.1	Timiș
Pâncota	Pankota	2.1	Arad
Cristian	Neustadt	1.9	Brașov
Lenauheim	Schadat	1.9	Timiș
Lugoj	Logosch	1.9	Timiș
Miercurea Sibiului	Reussmarkt	1.8	Sibiu
Rupea	Reps	1.7	Brașov
Sânpetru	Petersberg	1.7	Brașov
Ungra	Galt	1.7	Brașov
Reșița	Reschitz	1.7	Caraș-Severin
Ciacova	Tschakowa	1.6	Timiș
Cisnădie	Heltau	1.5	Sibiu
Mediaș	Mediasch	1.5	Sibiu
Moșna	Meschen	1.5	Sibiu
Sighișoara	Schässburg	1.5	Mureș
Oțelu Roșu	Ferdinandsberg	1.4	Caraș-Severin
Timișoara	Temeschburg/Temeswar	1.4	Timiș
Nițchidorf	Nitzkydorf	1.4	Timiș
Hălchiu	Heldsdorf	1.4	Sibiu
Merghindeal	Mergeln	1.3	Sibiu
Beba Veche	Altbeba	1.3	Timiș
Iacobeni	Jakobsdorf	1.3	Sibiu
Lipova	Lippa	1.3	Arad County
Homorod	Hamruden	1.2	Brașov
Hărman	Honigberg	1.2	Brașov
Matei	Mathesdorf	1.2	Bistrița-Năsăud
Sebeș	Mühlbach	1.1	Alba
Becicherecu Mic	Kleinbetschkerek	1.1	Timiș
Caransebeș	Karansebesch	1.1	Caraș-Severin
Bod	Brenndorf	1.1	Brașov
Brateiu	Pretai	1.0	Brașov
Bocșa	Neuwerk	1.0	Caraș-Severin
Satu Mare	Sathmar	1.0	Satu Mare
Sibiu	Hermannstadt	1.0	Sibiu
Mănăstirea Humorului	Humora Kloster	1.0	Suceava
Agnita	Agnetheln	1.0	Sibiu
Hoghilag	Halvelagen	1.0	Sibiu
Dumbrăveni	Elisabethstadt	1.0	Sibiu
Șeica Mare	Marktschelken	1.0	Sibiu
Codlea	Zeiden	1.0	Brașov
Gătaia	Gattaja	1.0	Timiș
Măureni	Moritzfeld	1.0	Caraș-Severin

=== Population as of 2011 by county ===
Below is represented the notable German minority population (of at least 1%) for some counties, according to the 2011 census.

County	Percent
Satu Mare	1.5%
Timiș	1.3%
Caraș-Severin	1.1%
Sibiu	1.1%

=== 2022 Romanian census data ===
As per the 2021 Romanian census, there are only c. 22,900 Germans still left in Romania, a notable decrease from the latest census of 2011. In addition, 0.10 of all Romanian citizens reported German as their first/native language (or 15,943 people), therefore making it one of the least spoken native languages (and also of any ethnic minority overall) in Romania.

== Administration, official representation, and politics ==
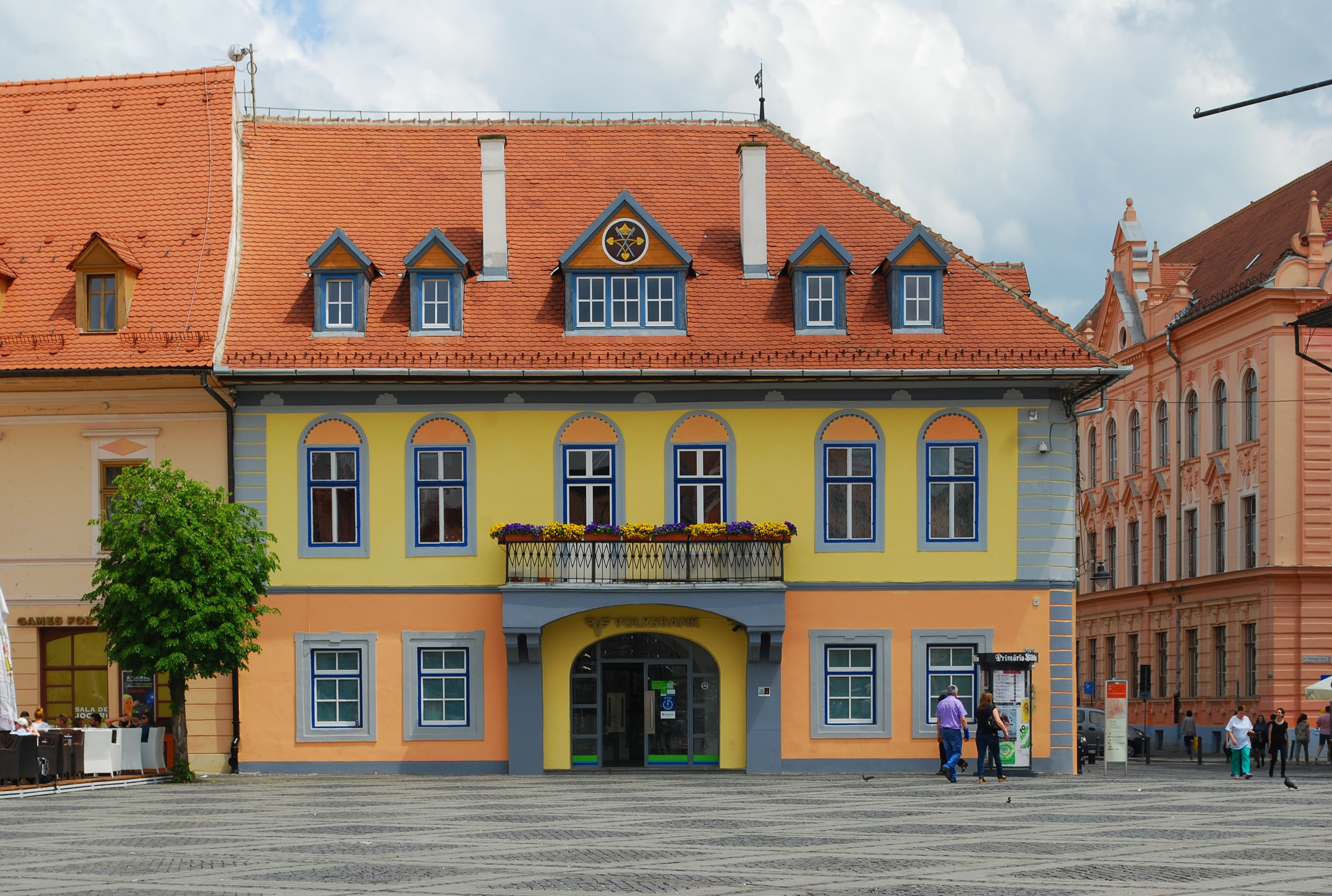
The Lutsch house, the seat of the FDGR/DFDR situated in Sibiu (German: Hermannstadt)

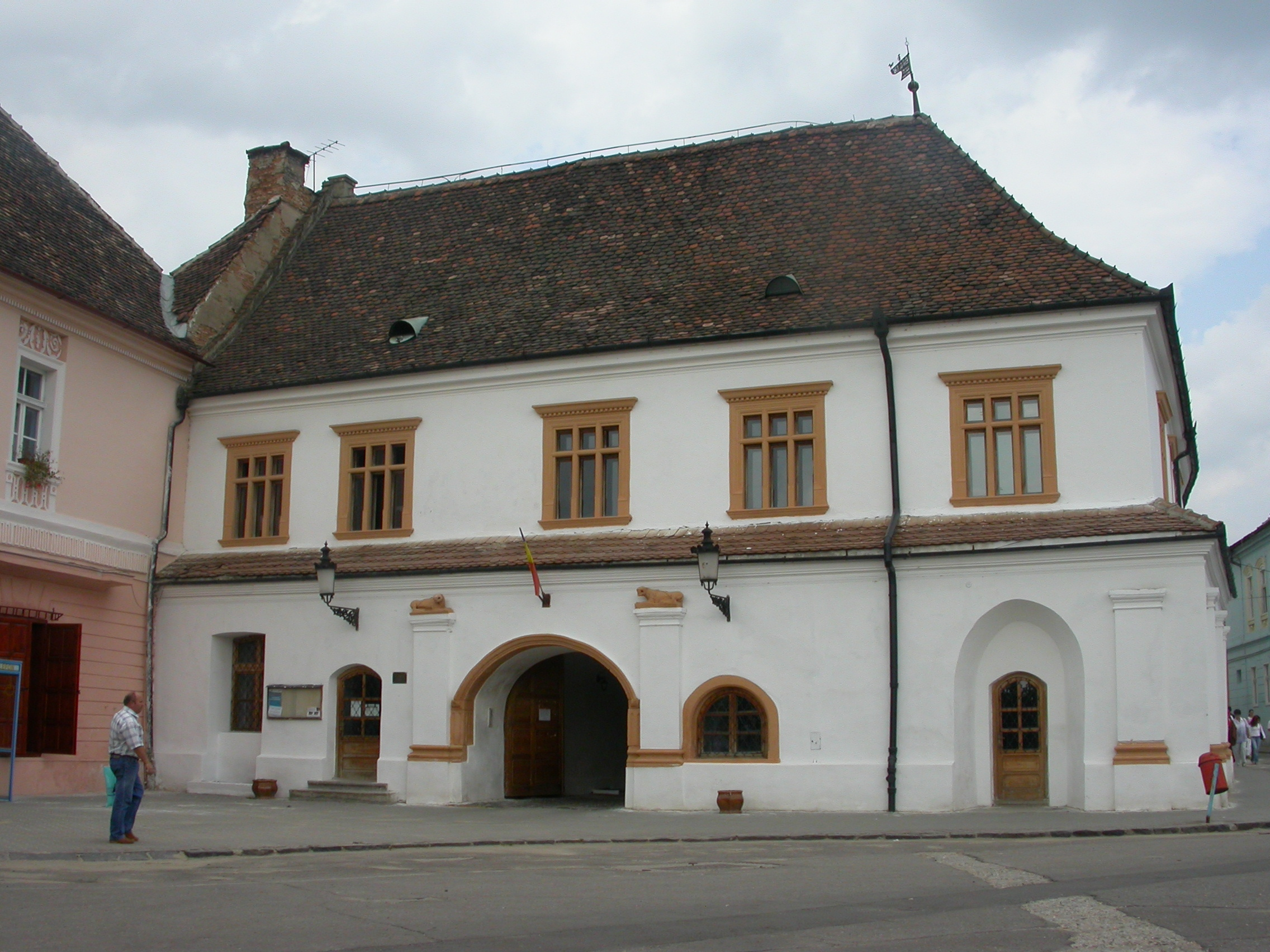
The Schuller house, the seat of the FDGR/DFDR situated in Mediaș (German: Mediasch)

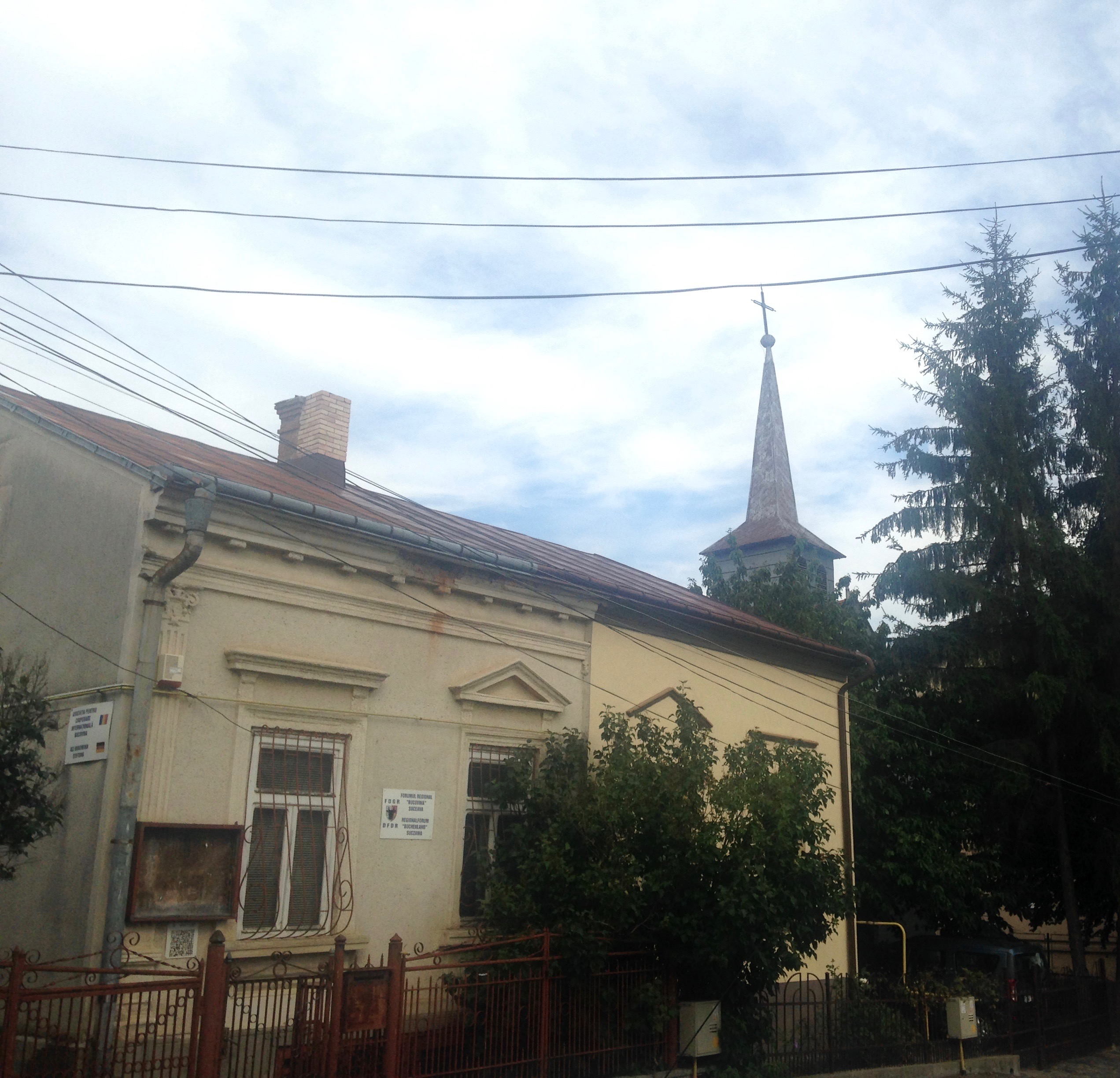
The local headquarters of FDGR/DFDR in Suceava (German: Suczawa), Bukovina in August, 2020.

In the wake of World War I, the German minority in unified Romania had been represented by a number of political parties which gradually gained parliamentary presence during the early to mid-early 20th century, more specifically the Swabian Group, the Group of Transylvanian Saxons, the German Party (which, under Rudolf Brandsch, briefly formed an electoral alliance known as the Hungarian German Bloc with the Magyar Party for the 1927 Romanian general election), and the German People's Party (the latter two having a national socialist political orientation after 1930). In stark contrast to the political mutation of both aforementioned parties, the Anti-Fascist Committee of German Workers in Romania was formed shortly thereafter as an anti-fascist and democratic counterpart. After the end of World War II, all of the political parties representing the German minority in Romania were either disbanded or ceased to exist.

Subsequently, since after the Romanian Revolution, the Democratic Forum of Germans in Romania (German: Demokratisches Forum der Deutschen in Rumänien, Romanian: Forumul Democrat al Germanilor din România) has been the political party representing the interests of Germans through the reserved seats for ethnic minorities in the Chamber of Deputies as well as in the local councils.

Since 1989, the FDGR/DFDR has competed both in local and legislative elections, cooperating in the process with the main parties of the centre-right, the National Liberal Party (PNL) and the Christian Democratic National Peasants' Party (PNȚCD), most notably at local administrative level, in cities such as Sibiu (German: Hermannstadt), Timișoara (German: Temeswar or Temeschburg), or Baia Mare (German: Frauenbach or Groß-Neustadt). The former President of Romania, Klaus Iohannis, was formerly chairman of the FDGR and mayor of Sibiu and subsequently was elected President on the National Liberal ticket.

Until 1 January 2007 (i.e. the date of accession of Romania to the European Union), the FDGR/DFDR was also an observing member of the European Parliament (EU), briefly affiliated with the European People's Party (EPP; German: Europäische Volkspartei), between January and November of the same year, with only one seat occupied by member and current deputy Ovidiu Victor Ganț.

== Religion ==
The vast majority of the Romanian-Germans are either Roman Catholic or Protestant (i.e. Lutheran). The Lutherans pertain to the Evangelical Church of the Augsburg Confession (German: Evangelische Kirche A.B. [Augsburgischen Bekenntnisses] in Rumänien).

== Culture and education ==
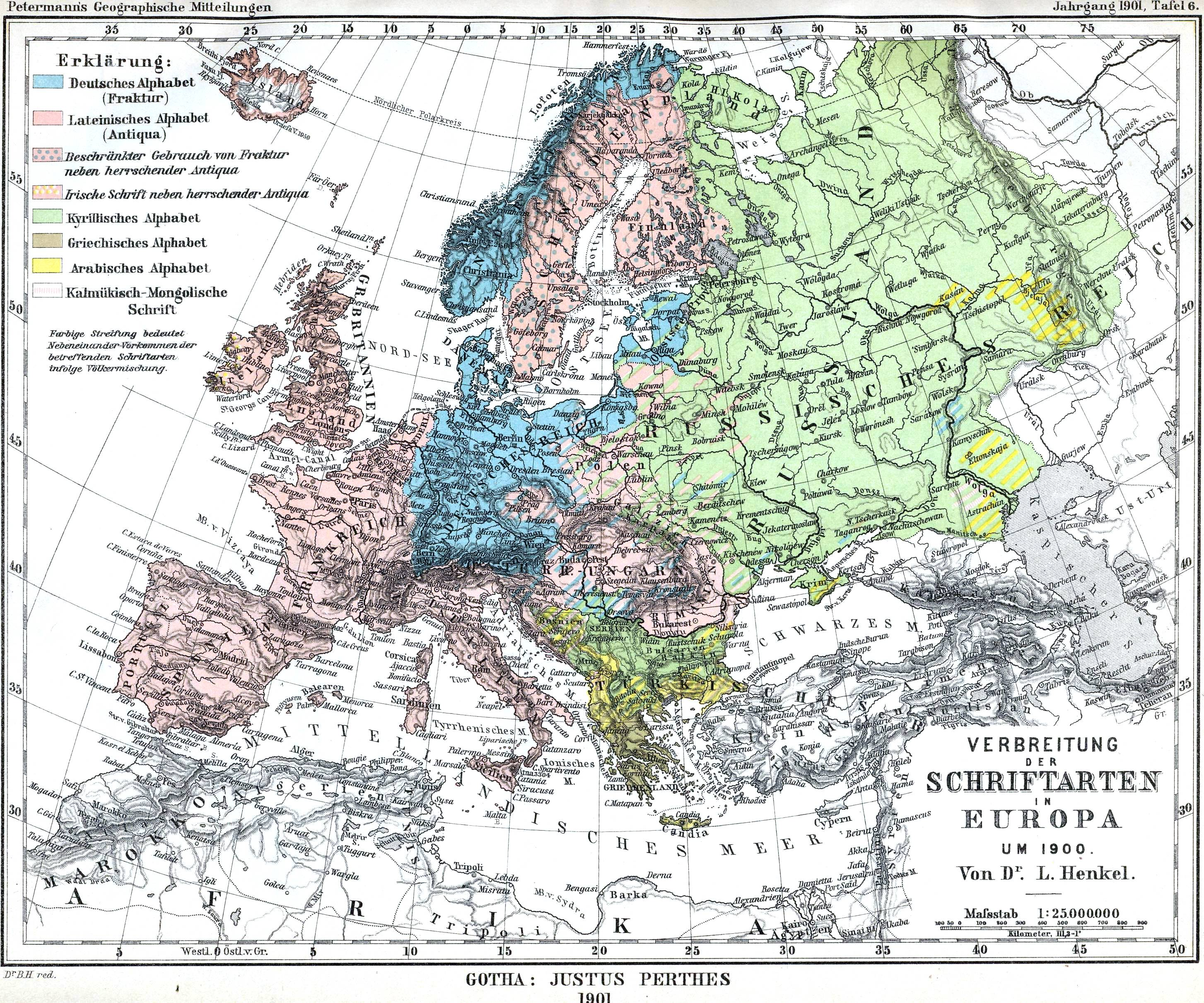
Detailed map depicting the scripts in Europe in 1901. The Germans in Romania used the Fraktur script. Areas where the Fraktur script was used in the former Kingdom of Romania are denoted in light blue dashes on this map and correspond to the historical regions of Banat, Transylvania, and Bukovina (all of them situated in Central Europe or Mitteleuropa, at least by cultural criterion).

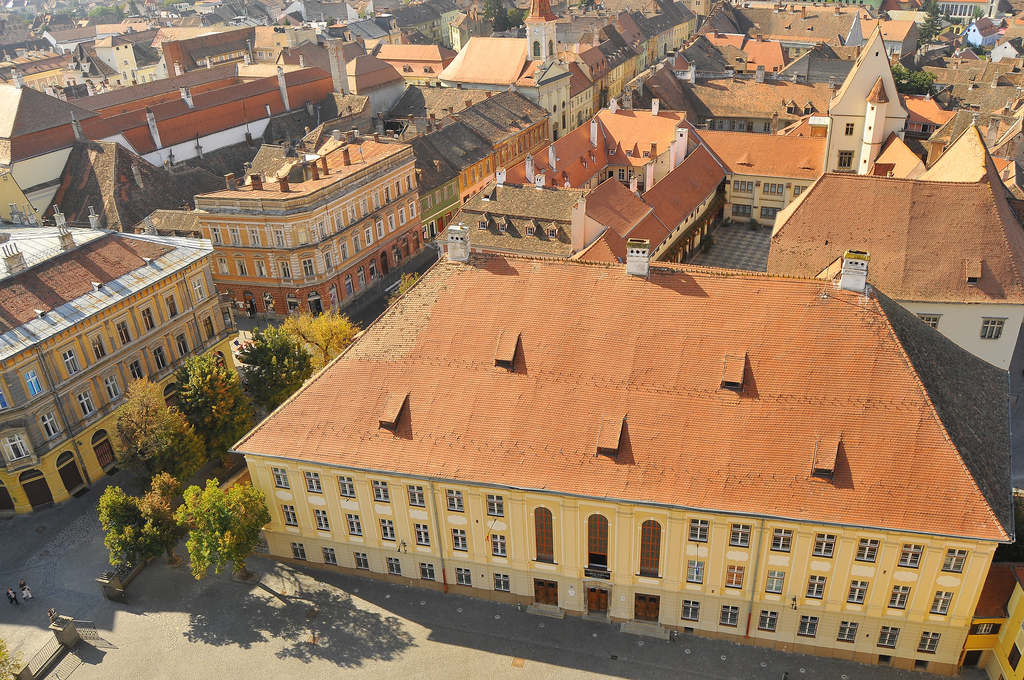
Samuel von Brukenthal National College in Sibiu (German: Hermannstadt)

In 1922, all political representatives of the German community in Romania founded the Cultural League of Germans in Sibiu/Hermannstadt which was initially led by Richard Csaki. The league was in charge of organizing post-university summer courses, sending books, and providing teaching material through various lecturers in the settlements inhabited by ethnic Germans.

Nowadays, there are two German-language schools in Bucharest, namely Deutsche Schule Bukarest and Deutsches Goethe-Kolleg Bukarest. The Deutsche Schule Bukarest serves Kinderkrippe (nursery), Kindergarten, Grundschule (elementary school), and Gymnasium (high school).

In Timișoara (German: Temeschburg or Temeswar), the Nikolaus Lenau High School was founded during the late 19th century. It was named this way in reference to Nikolaus Lenau, a Banat Swabian Romanticist poet. Nowadays, the Nikolaus Lenau High School is considered the most important of its kind from Banat.

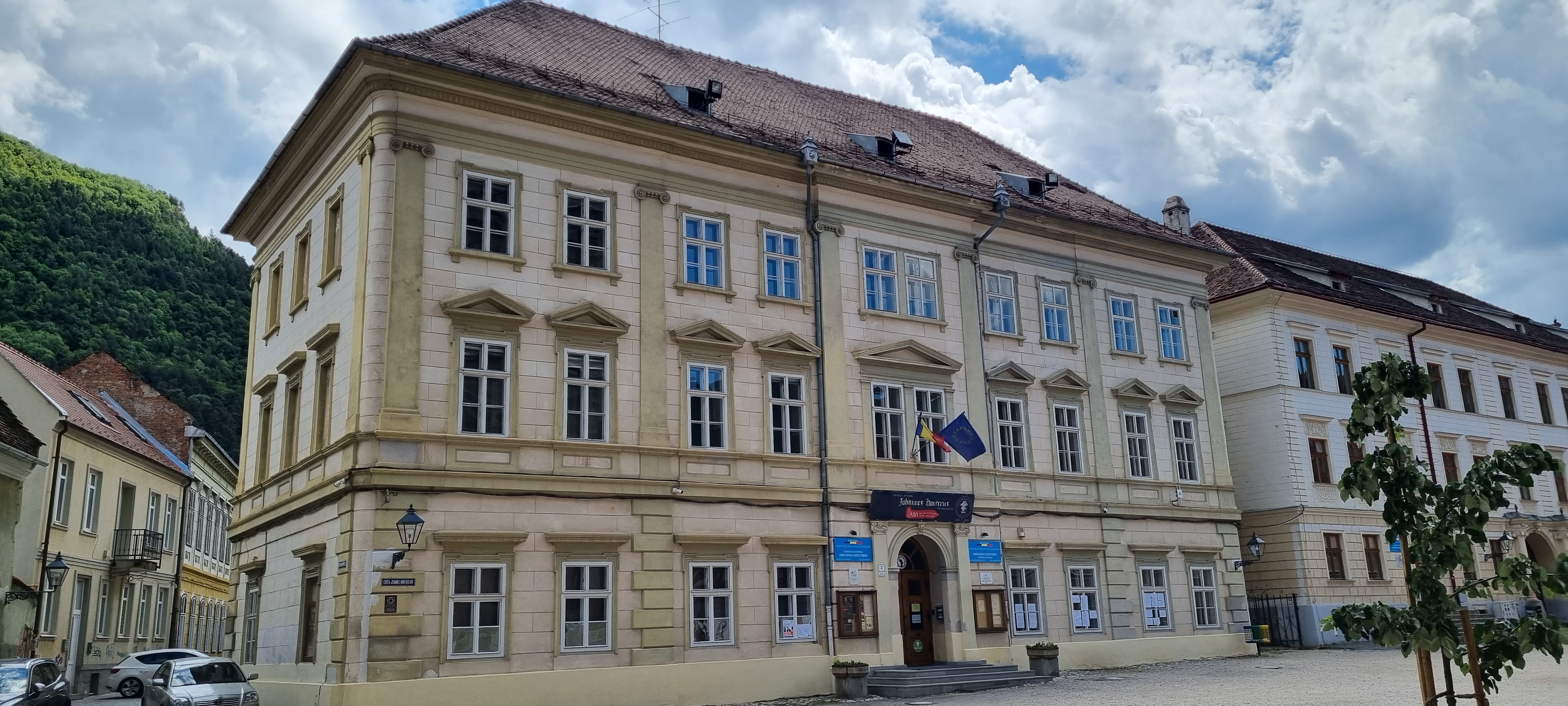
The Johannes Honterus National College in Brașov/Kronstadt (July 2022)

In Sibiu/Hermannstadt, the Samuel von Brukenthal National College is the oldest German-language school from Romania (recorded as early as the 14th century), being also classified as a historical monument. It was subsequently renamed this way in reference to baron Samuel von Brukenthal, a Transylvanian Saxon aristocrat. Additionally, there is one Goethe Institut cultural centre based in Bucharest as well as five Deutsche Kultzertrum based in Iași, Brașov, Cluj-Napoca, Timișoara, and Sibiu.

In Brașov/Kronstadt, the German-language school is the Johannes Honterus National College, named after the renowned great 16th century Transylvanian Saxon scholar and humanist Johannes Honterus.

The German State Theatre Timișoara (German: Deutsches Staatstheater Temeswar) is one of the oldest state theaters in Romania.

== Media ==
Logo of Allgemeine Deutsche Zeitung für Rumänien (ADZ)

The Allgemeine Deutsche Zeitung für Rumänien (ADZ) is the daily German-language newspaper in contemporary Romania. To this day, it is the only German-language newspaper published in Eastern Europe. Regional German-language publications also include the Neue Banater Zeitung in Banat and the Hermannstädter Zeitung for the town of Sibiu (German: Hermannstadt). Previously, in the passing of time, other historical German-language newspapers included: Arbeiter-Zeitung, Temeswarer Nachrichten (the first German-language newspaper published in Southaestern Europe), and Banater Arbeiter-Presse in Banat, Vorwärts in Bukovina, and Neuer Weg in Bucharest.

On the Romanian public TV channel TVR, the show of the German minority in Romania is called Akzente and airs quite regularly. It celebrated its 50th anniversary in December 2019. The show is dubbed in standard German (i.e. Hochdeutsch) and subtitled in Romanian as well.

== Gallery ==
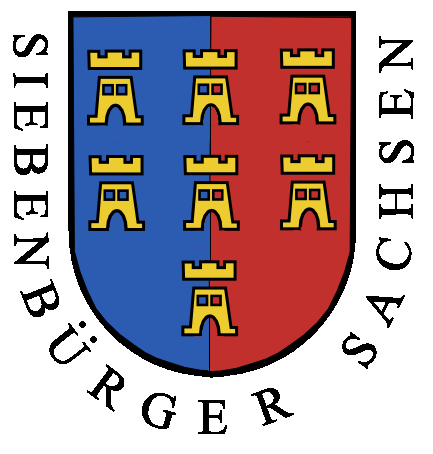
Historical coat of arms of the Transylvanian Saxons

Historical coat of arms of the Bukovina Germans

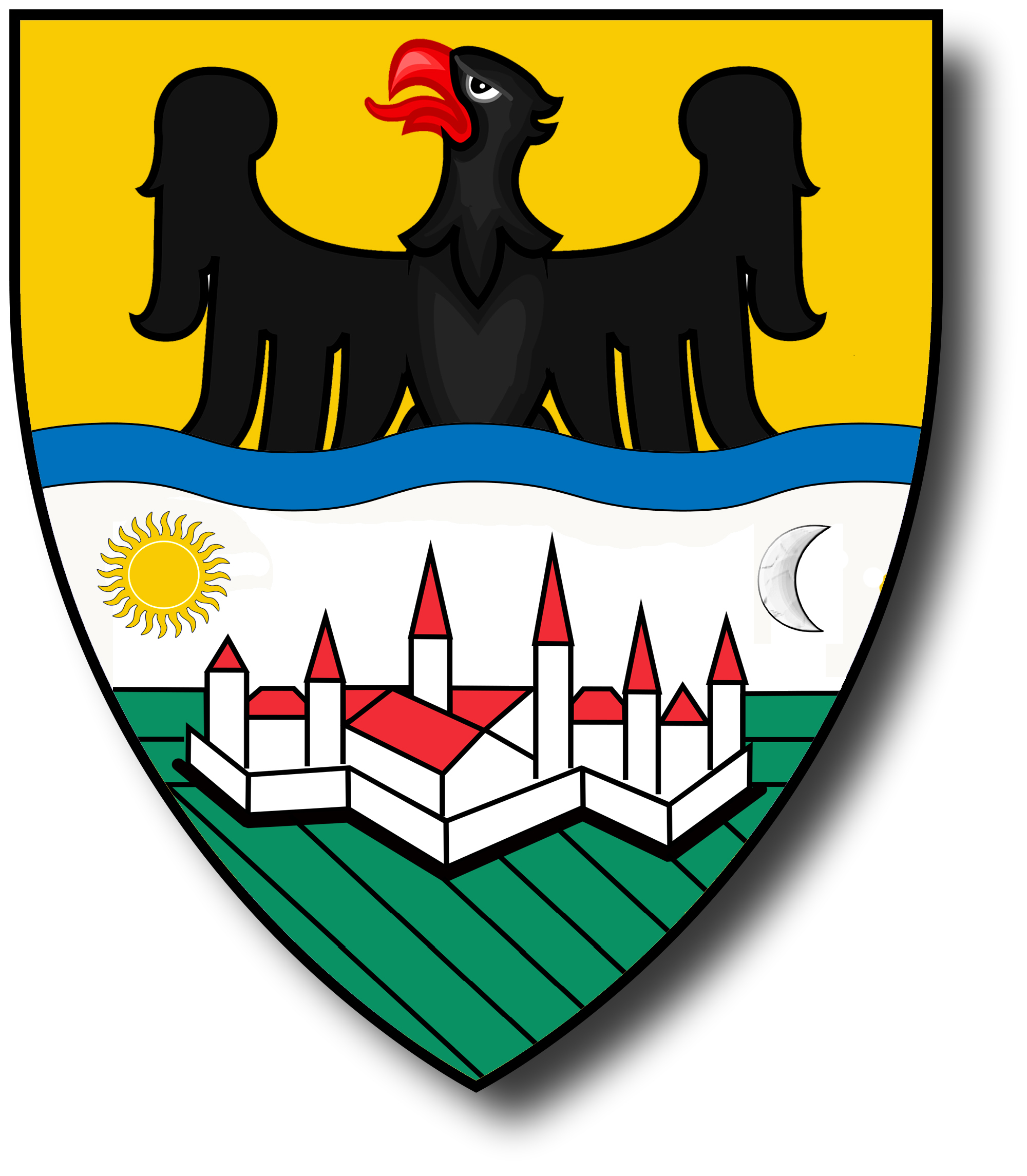
Historical coat of arms of the Banat Swabians (Note: As part of the Banat Swabians)

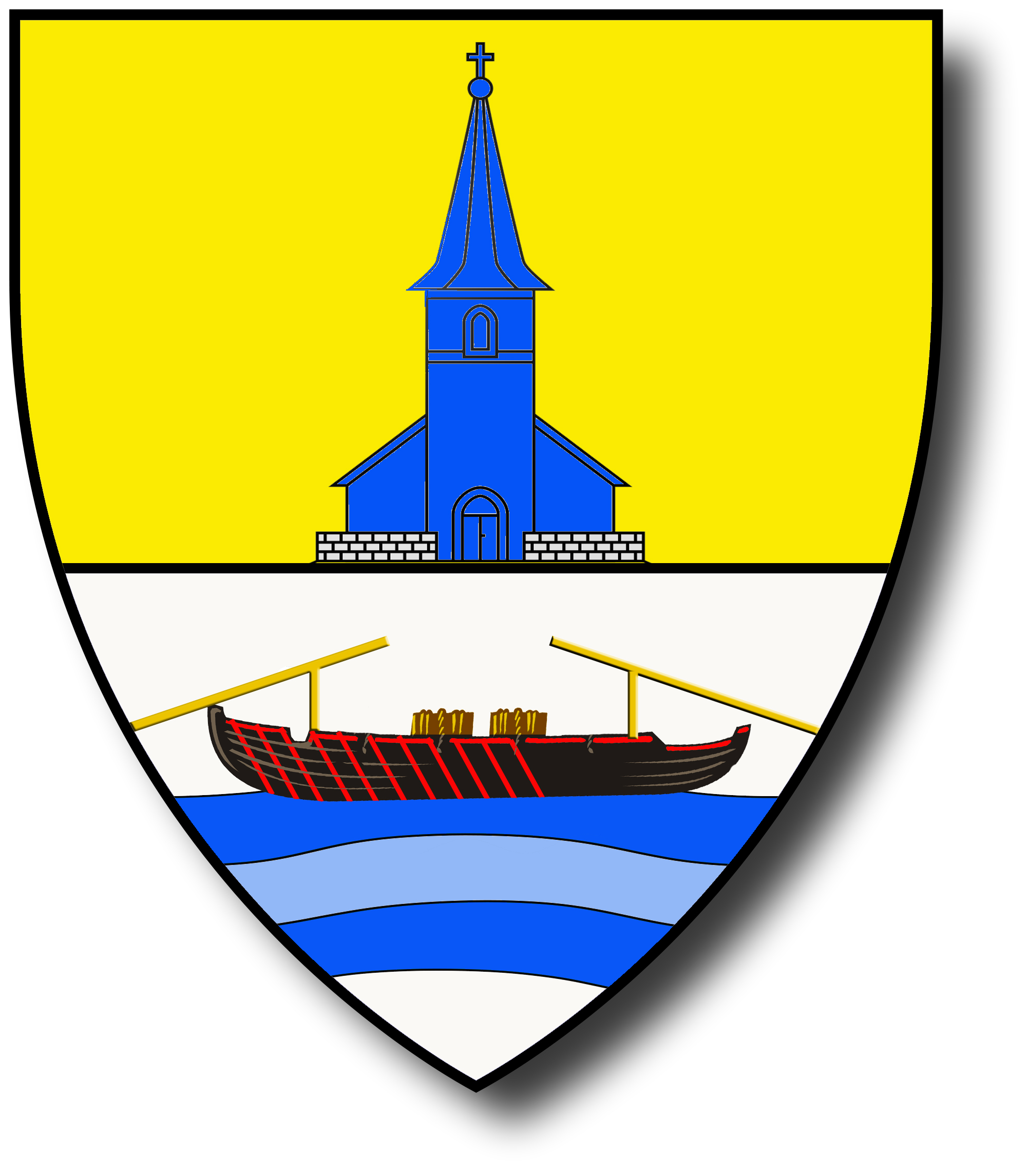
Historical coat of arms of the Sathmar Swabians

Historical coat of arms of the Dobrujan Germans

Historical coat of arms of the Bessarabia Germans

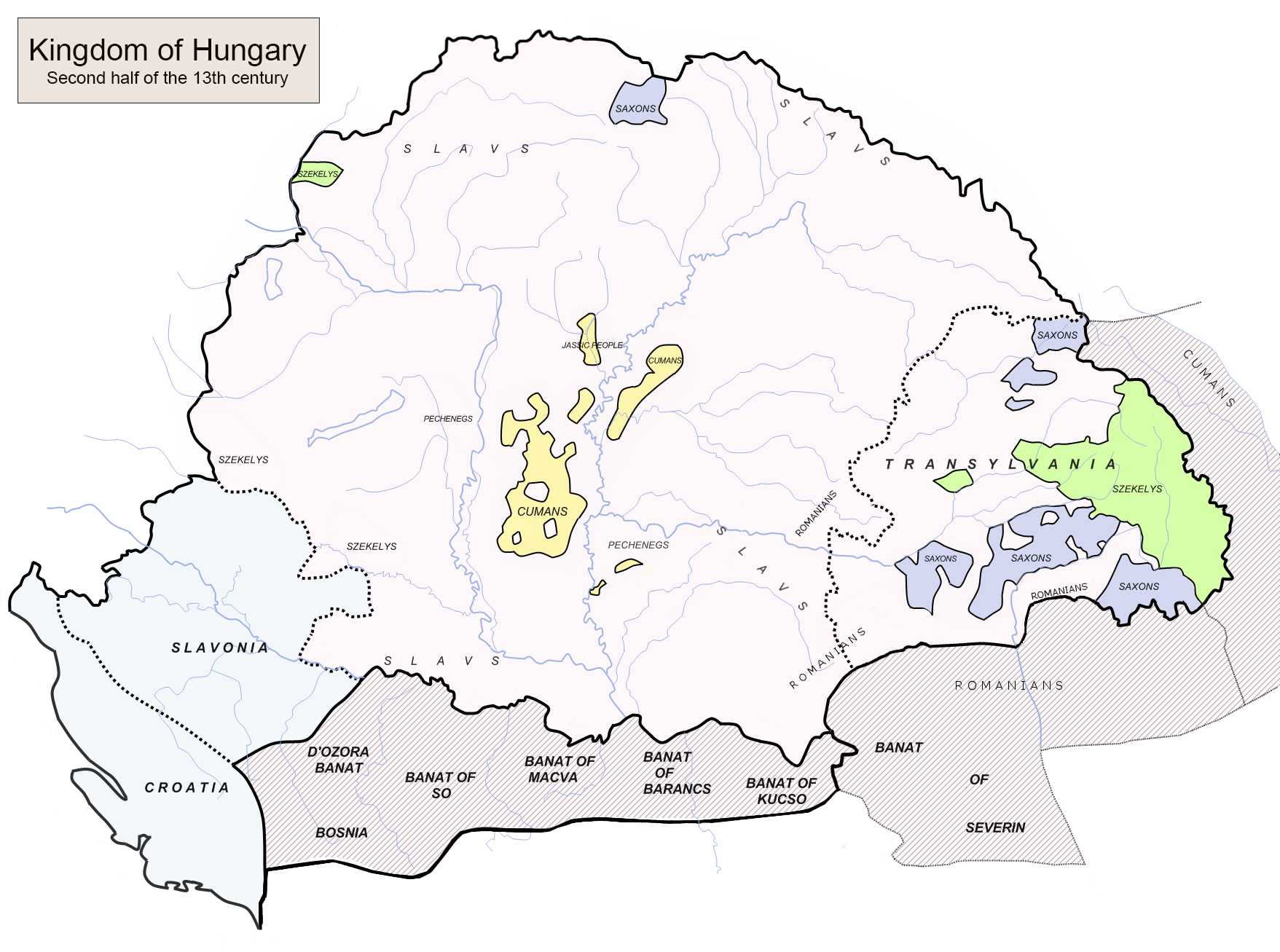
13th century map of the Kingdom of Hungary highlighting Saxon-populated areas

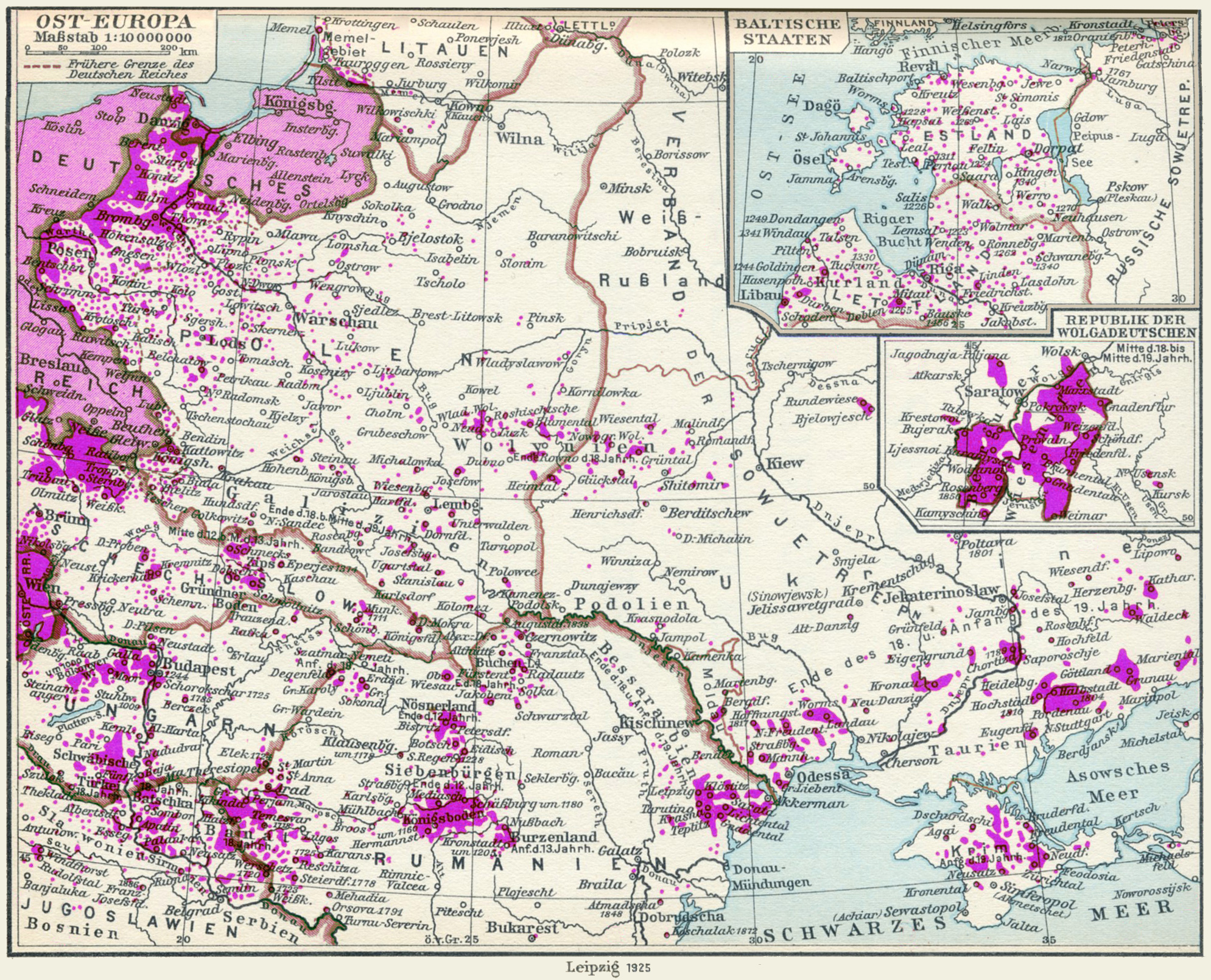
Distribution of ethnic Germans in Central and Eastern Europe in 1925, also highlighting German settlements in the Kingdom of Romania

Traditional areas of settlement for the Saxons and Swabians in Transylvania and Banat, Kingdom of Romania (at the round of the 20th century)

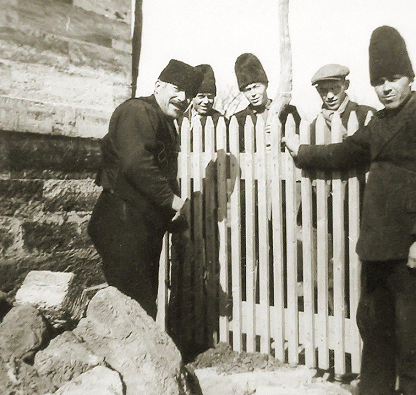
A group of Bessarabian Germans (c. 1935)

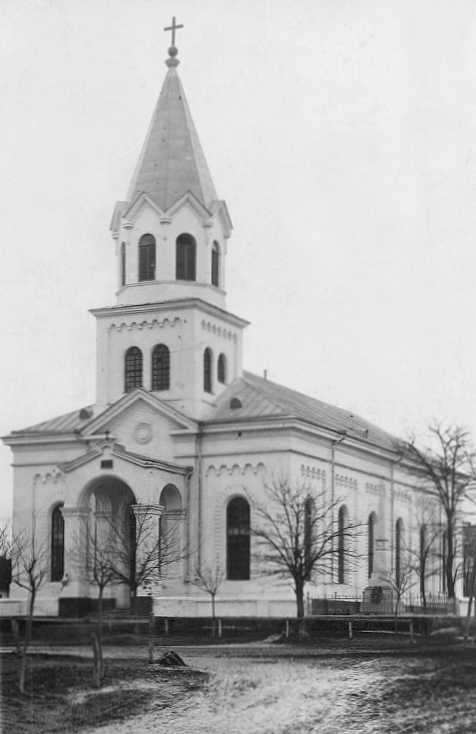
The Lutheran church of Vesela Dolyna (Romanian: Cleaștiţa, German: Klöstitz), situated in Budjak, initially populated by Bessarabian Germans (up until 1940)

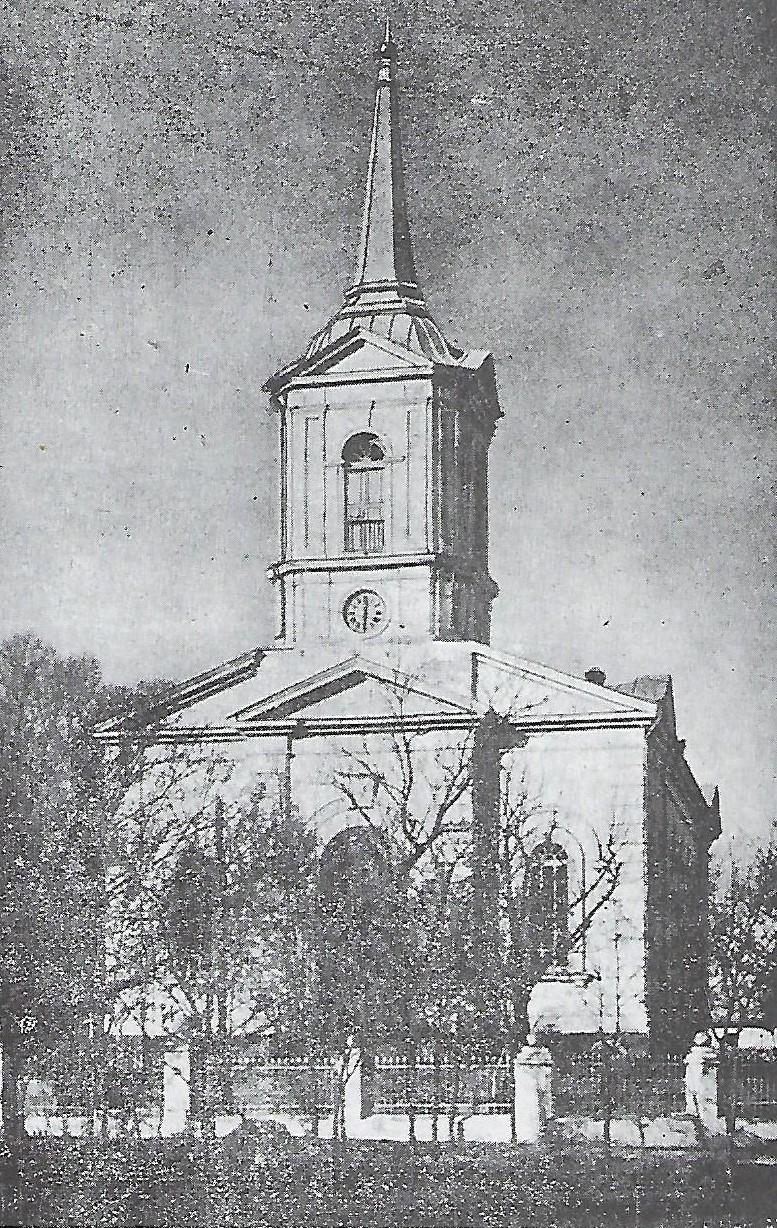
Lutheran Church in Tarutino

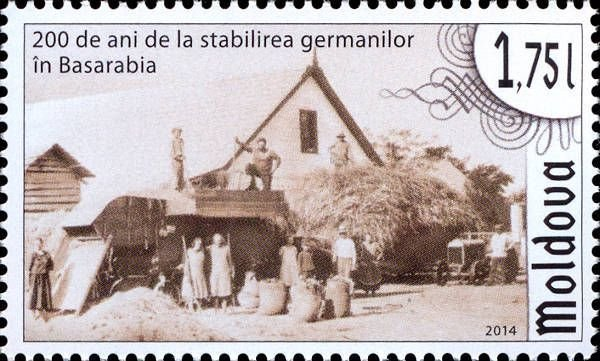
2014 Moldovan stamp commemorating 200 years since the arrival of the Bessarabia Germans in Bessarabia

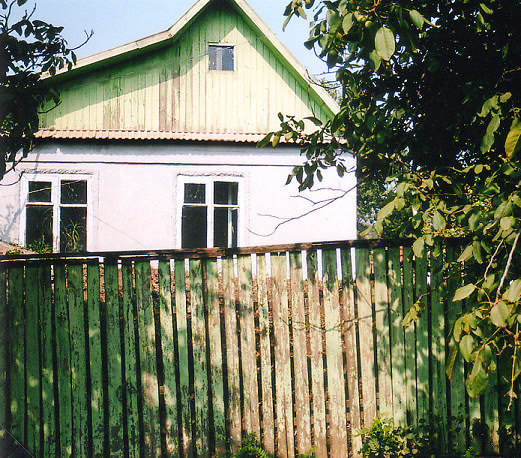
Typical German house in Hannowka, Bessarabia

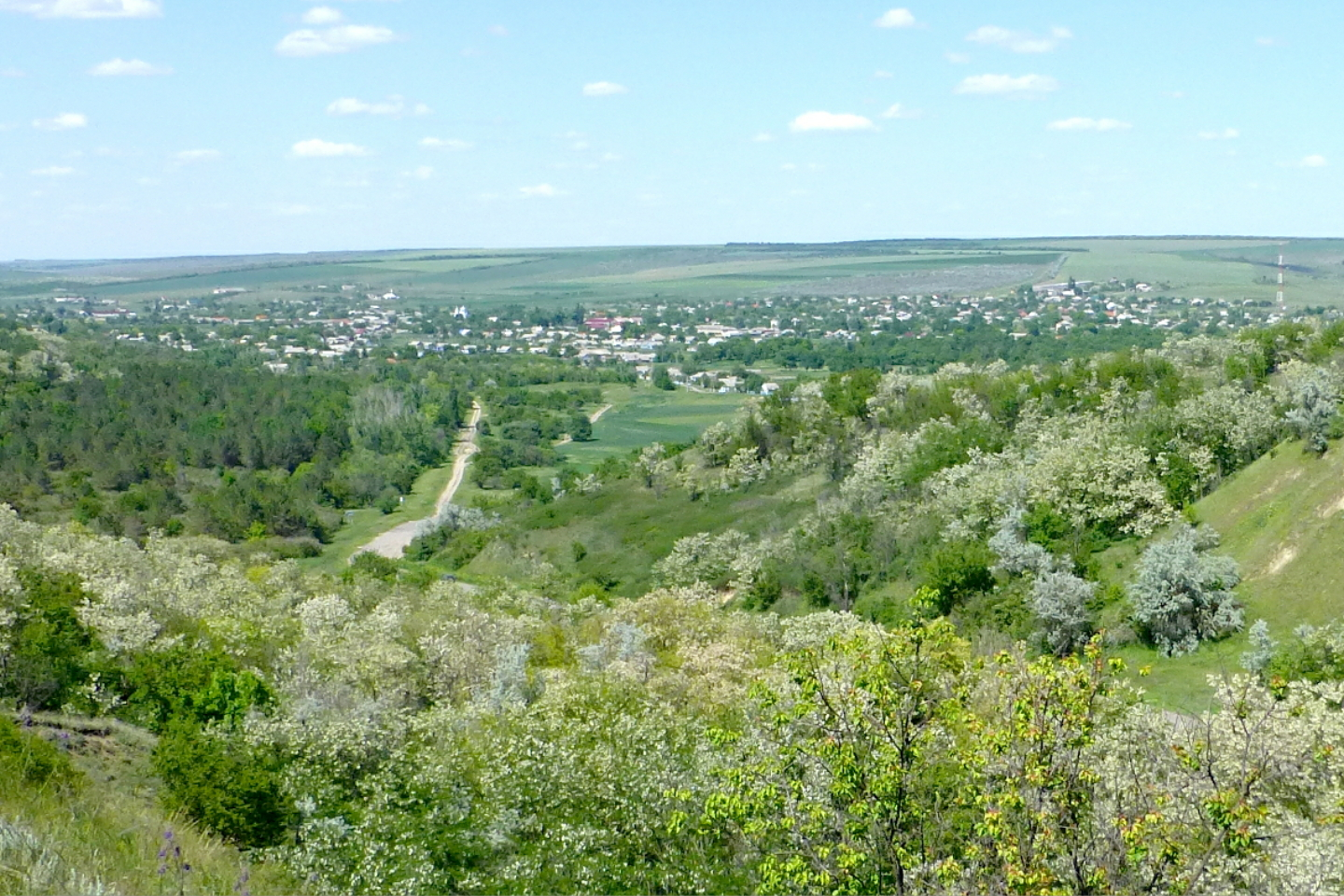
Hoffnungstal, former German colony in Bessarabia

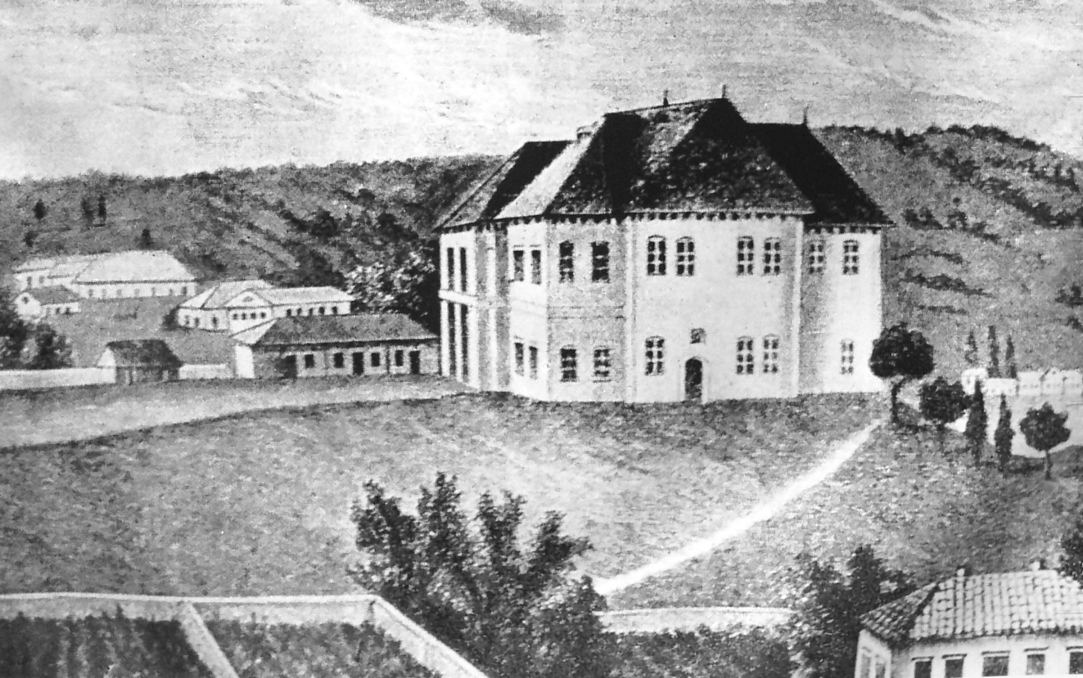
The seat of the Wellbeing Committee in Chișinău (German: Kischinew) in 1820

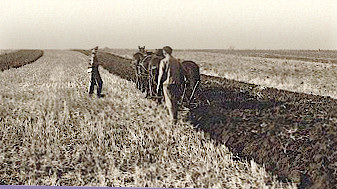
Bessarabia German peasant with the plow on the field in 1940

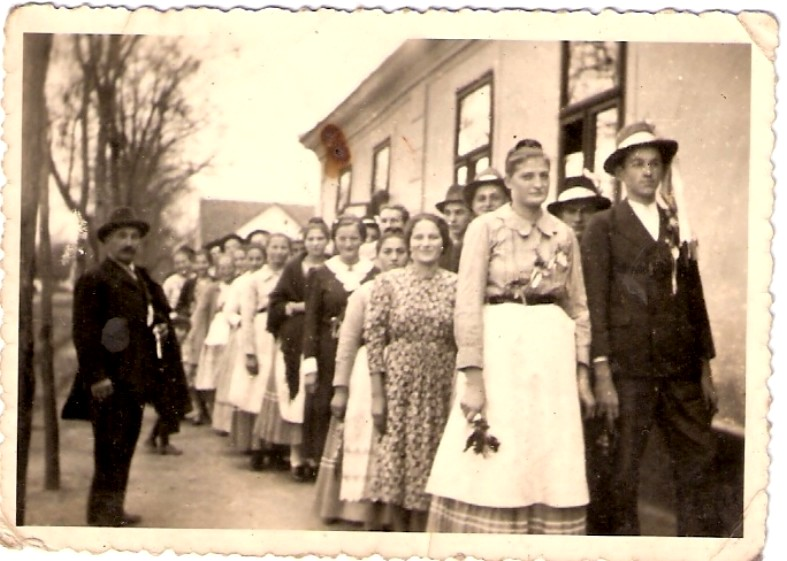
A group of Banat Swabians in 1940, celebrating 'Kirchweih' (or 'Kerwei' in their local dialect)

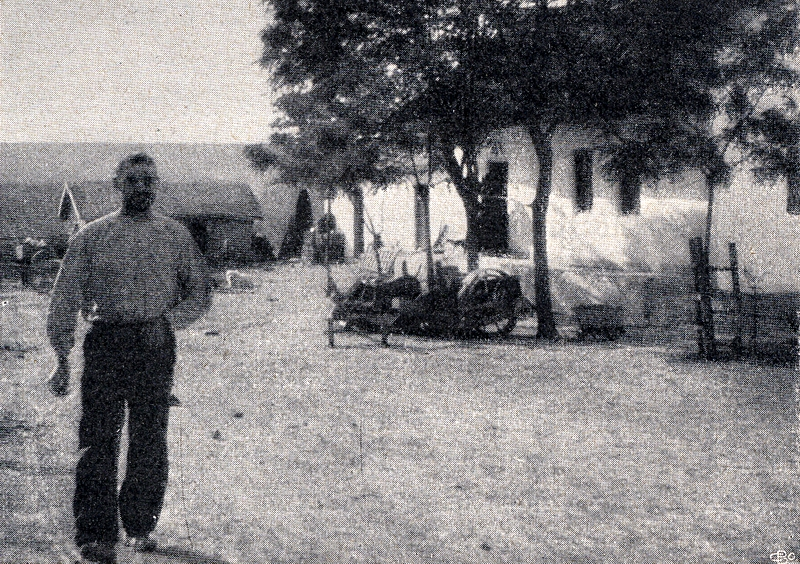
A Dobrujan German in the former village of Colilia (German: Colelie, Kolelie or Kulelie), Constanța County

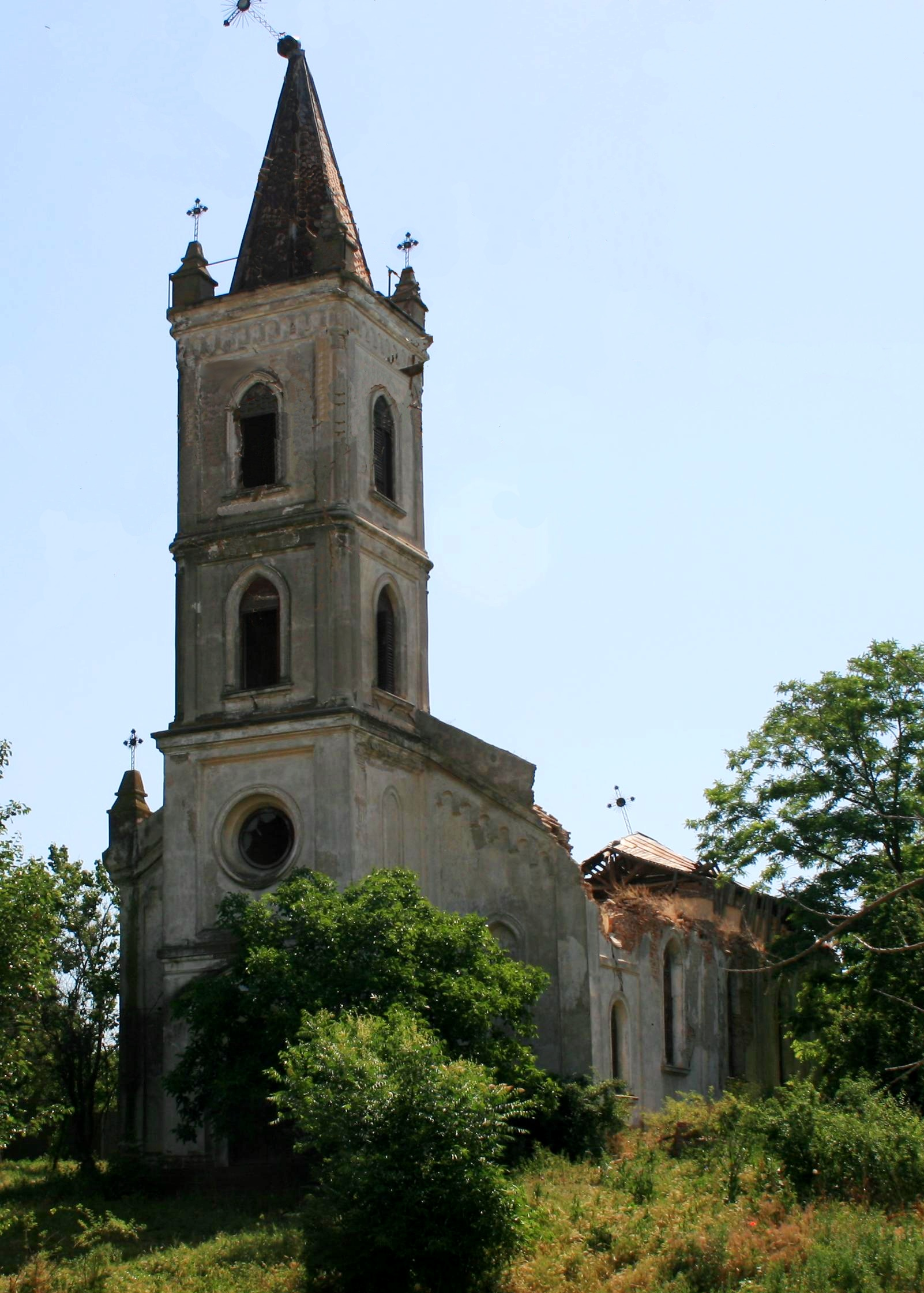
The ruins of the Lutheran church of Malcoci (German: Malkotsch) of the Dobrujan Germans in Tulcea County

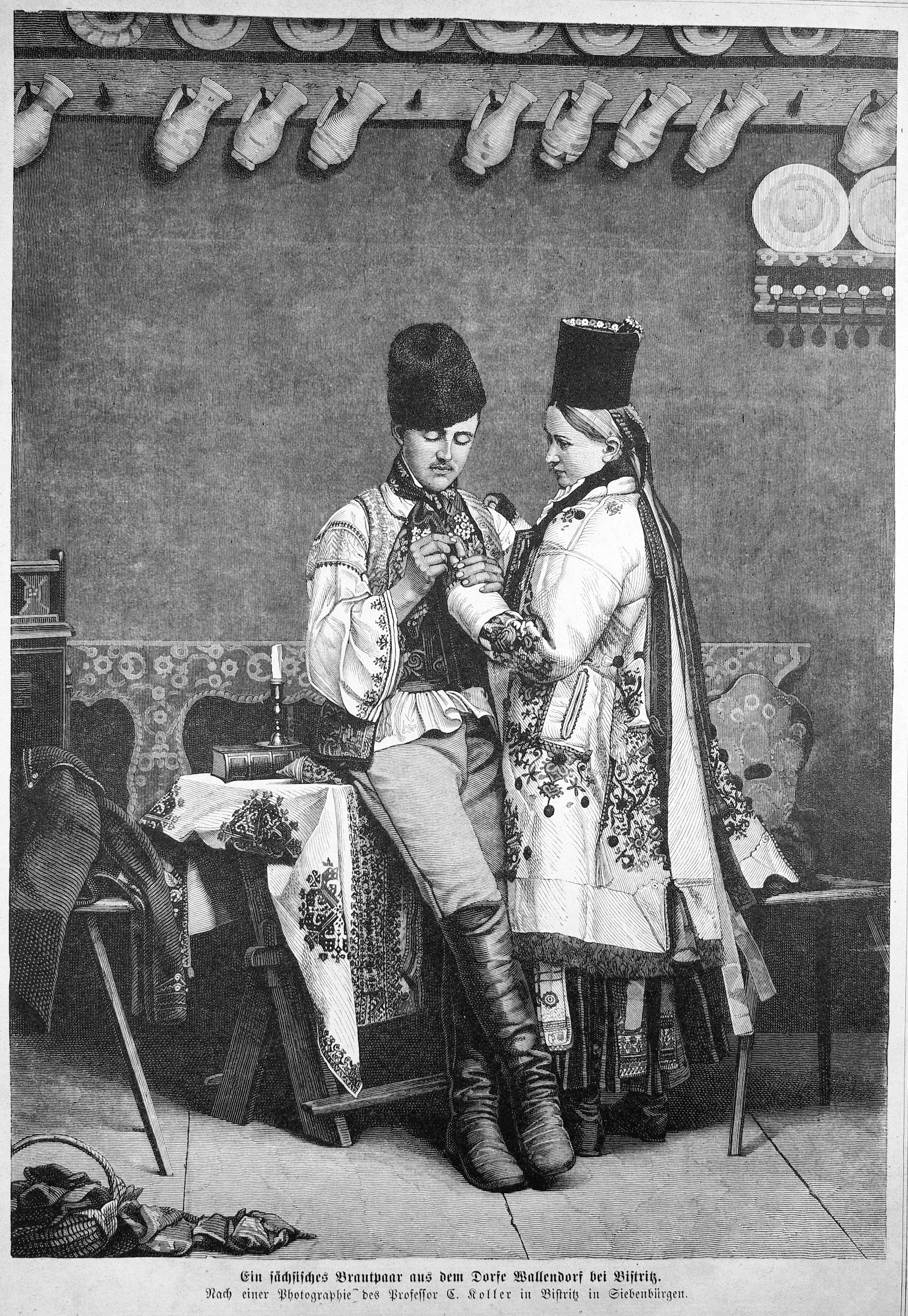
Transylvanian Saxon couple from Bistrița (German: Bistritz/Nösen) area

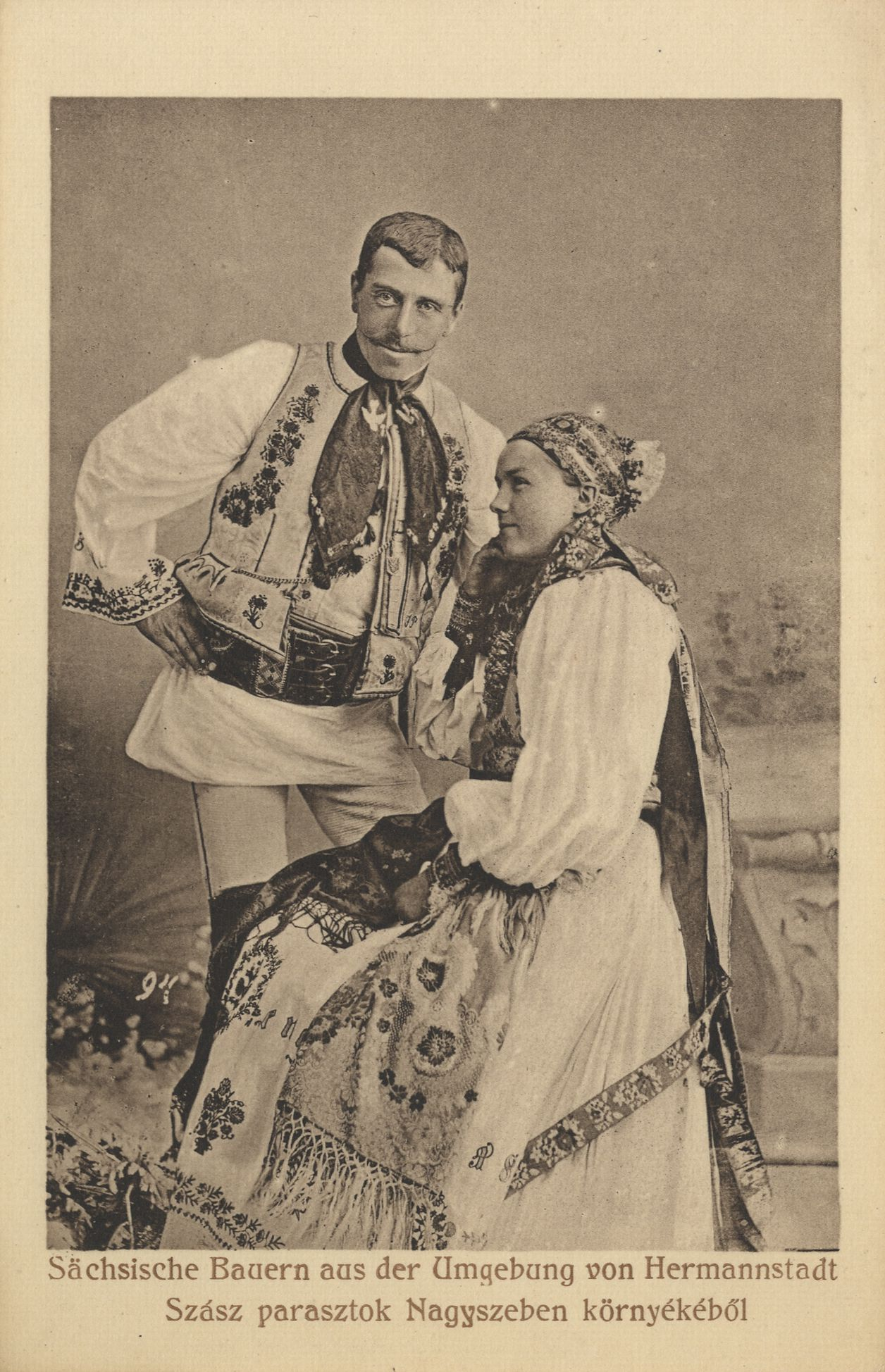
Transylvanian Saxon couple from Sibiu (German: Hermannstadt)

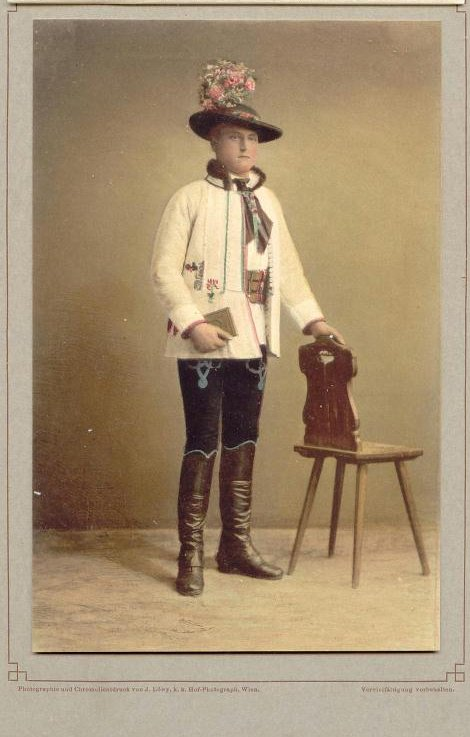
Transylvanian Saxon lad from Gușterița (German: Hammersdorf)

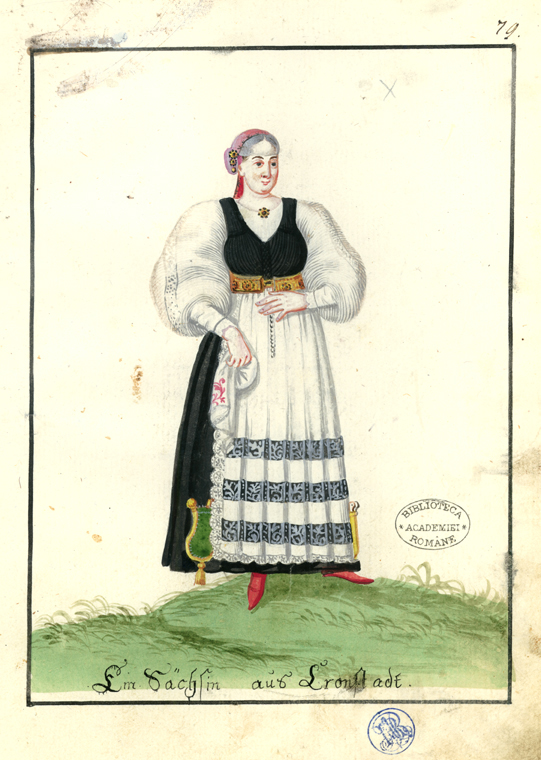
Traditional Saxon woman costume from Brașov (German: Kronstadt)

== See also ==
- Germany–Romania relations
- Germany–Moldova relations
- List of ambassadors of Germany to Romania
- Romanians in Germany
- Transylvanian Saxon dialect
- Transylvanian Saxon cuisine
- Villages with fortified churches in Transylvania
- List of fortified churches in Transylvania
- List of Transylvanian Saxon localities
- Group of Transylvanian Saxons
- List of Transylvanian Saxons
- Sibiu Lutheran Cathedral
- Siebenbürgenlied
- Transylvanian Museum (in Gundelsheim, Baden-Württemberg, south-western Germany)
- Association of Transylvanian Saxons in Germany
- German culture
- Geographical distribution of German speakers
