= Banat Swabians =

German ethnic group

German: Banater Schwaben

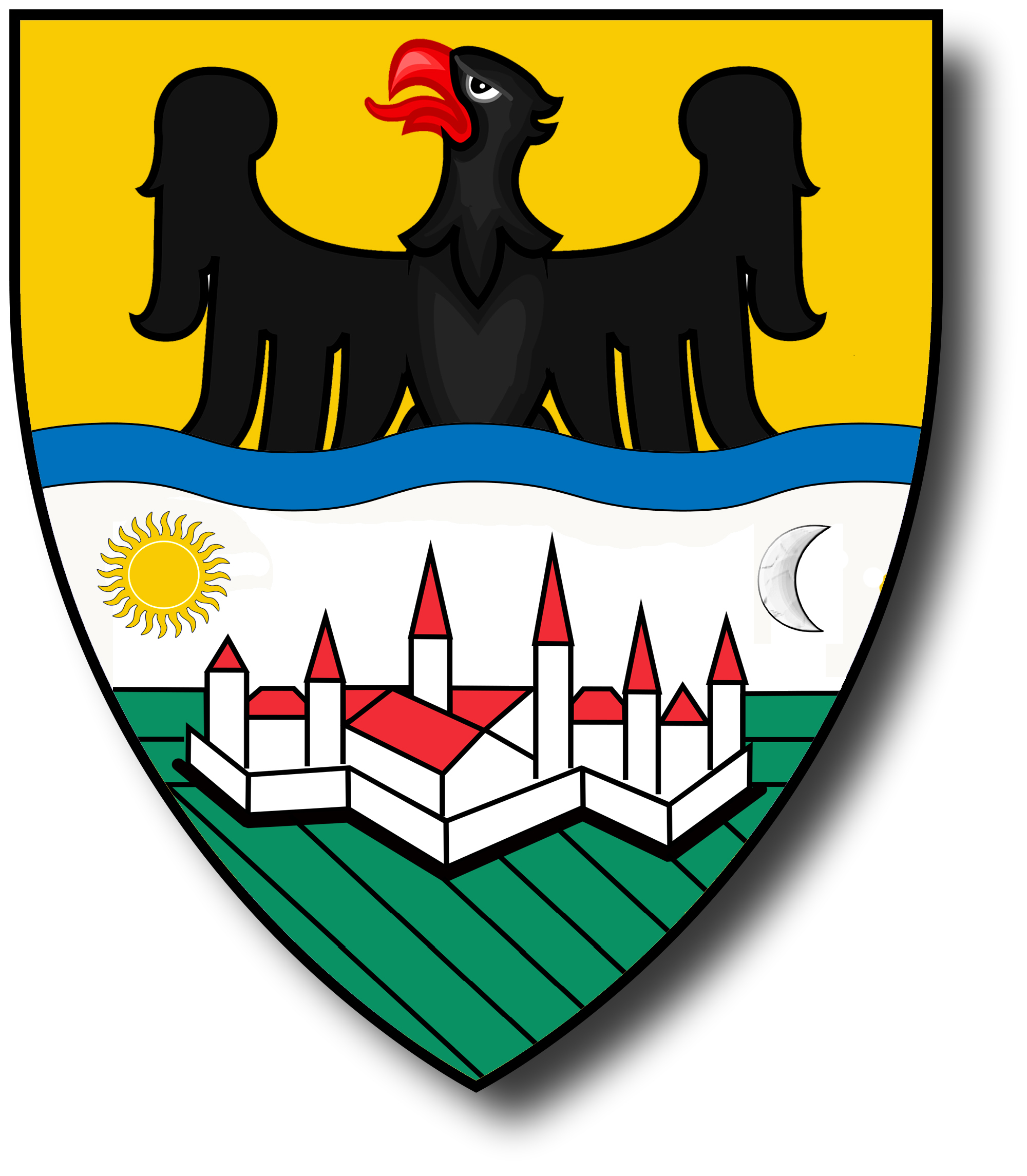
- The coat of arms of the Banat Swabians (as part of the Danube Swabians)

Regions with significant populations
- Banat (south-western Romania)

Languages
- German (with the Banat Swabian dialect, a local type of the Swabian dialect)

Religion
- Primarily Roman Catholicism

Related ethnic groups
- Germans (most notably Swabians and Danube Swabians respectively)
- Native to south-western present-day Romania

The Banat Swabians are an ethnic German population in the Banat region in Central-Southeast Europe, part of the culturally homogenous but geographically widespread group of Danube Swabians, and of the culturally varied Germans of Romania. They emigrated in the 18th century to what was then the Austrian Empire's Banat of Temeswar province, a province which had been left sparsely populated in the wake of the wars against the Ottoman Empire. At the end of World War I in 1918, the Swabian minority worked together with the Hungarians and Jews to establish an independent multi-ethnic Banat Republic; however, the province was divided by the Treaty of Versailles of 1919, and the Treaty of Trianon of 1920. The greater part was annexed by Romania, a smaller part by the Kingdom of Serbs, Croats and Slovenes (renamed Yugoslavia in 1929), with just a small region around Szeged remaining part of Hungary.

== Banat and the Danube Swabians ==
The Banat colonists are often grouped with other German-speaking ethnic groups in the area under the name Danube Swabians. Besides the Banat, these groups lived in nearby western Bačka in Vojvodina, Serbia, in Swabian Turkey (present-day southern Hungary), in Slavonia, (present-day Croatia), and in Satu Mare, Romania. All of these areas were in the Kingdom of Hungary under Austrian rule, when the Crown recruited German immigrants, particularly farmers. It wanted to repopulate the lands newly recovered from Turkish occupation and to revive agriculture in an area that had been frequently overrun by war.

== History ==
=== 19th century ===
Traditionally German (Saxon or Swabian) territories in Banat and Transylvania

Immigrants were encouraged to settle in the Banat by the Austrian emperors in the 18th century to repopulate a frontier province bordering the Turkish empire, and to add ethnic European Christians to the population of the newly occupied region. The Germans were offered free land and the privilege of keeping their language and religion. Some were able to move into existing houses that had been abandoned by previous occupants. The Crown was seeking Roman Catholic immigrants, as were the Italian and the Spanish colonists who had come to the region. Most of the German settlers came from Alsace-Lorraine, Austria, Bavaria, Franconia, and the Palatinate. A small group can be traced to Middle Germany. However, comparatively few came from the Swabian regions of what was then known as Further Austria. It is unclear how the group came to be called the Banat Swabians, but it is probably because the majority registered and embarked from the Swabian city of Ulm. They were transported on the Ulmer Schachteln (barges) down the Danube to Budapest or Belgrade, whence they set off on foot for their new homes.

The colonists were generally the younger sons of poor farming families, who saw little chance of success at home. Under Maria Theresa, they received financial support and long-term tax relief.

However, most of the Banat was low-lying swampland unsuitable for growing food, so colonists had to build a robust irrigation system that eventually transformed the land. Farmers in the area grew corn, grain, hemp, tobacco, and sunflowers. Banaters also cultivated mulberries and silkworms.

Many of the earliest immigrants never married, since few German women traveled among them. Craftsmen were financially encouraged, as were teachers, doctors, and other professionals. Over the decades and more, the German spoken by these colonists became separate from that developing in Germany, particularly after its unification. It became known as Donau-Swabian, an archaic form of the language.

As the region became more secure, the Austrian government encouraged other ethnic groups to migrate to the region. Those who came from French-speaking or linguistically mixed communes in Lorraine maintained the French language (labelled Banat French or Français du Banat), as well as a separate ethnic identity for several generations.

Beginning with 1893, the nationalistic Hungarian State implemented a set Magyarisation policies designed to assimilate ethnic minorities into Hungarian culture. They made Hungarian the mandatory language in schools, pressured individuals to change their names to Hungarian versions, and officially changed village names to Hungarian -- Josefsdorf, for example, became known as Josefalva. The Hungarian government also exercised extreme control over the local economy.

Economic failures, cultural pressure, and the threat of having to enlist in the Hungarian Army prompted many Banat Swabians to leave the region beginning in the 1890s. Some moved to Bulgaria, where they settled in the village of Bardarski Geran, Vratsa Province, founded earlier by Banat Bulgarians. Their number eventually exceeded 90 families. In 1929 they built a separate Roman Catholic church after disagreements with Bulgarian Catholics. Some of these German-speaking families later moved to Tsarev Brod, Shumen Province along with a handful of Banat Bulgarian families who went to another Banat Bulgarian village, Gostilya, Pleven Province. Others moved to Croatia and Serbia.

The United States of America, seeking to populate the midwest, sent recruiters to Hungary to encourage people to immigrate. By the start of World War I, 20% of Banaters lived in the United States—many of them in North Dakota. Upon arrival, however, many Banaters felt cheated when they discovered that the farmland there was just as difficult as it had been in the Banat.

=== Banat Republic ===
During the dissolution of Austria-Hungary in 1918, Banaters attempted to declare their own multi-ethnic republic rather than be incorporated into any of the emerging nation-states. The project was generally supported by Hungarians, Swabians, and Jews—but opposed by Romanians and Serbs on the outskirts of the Banat region. The republic was only recognized by the neighboring Hungarian Republic, and surrounding forces fought over the land. After significant bloodshed, the region was divided up between Yugoslavia, Romania, and Hungary.

=== 1920–1944 ===
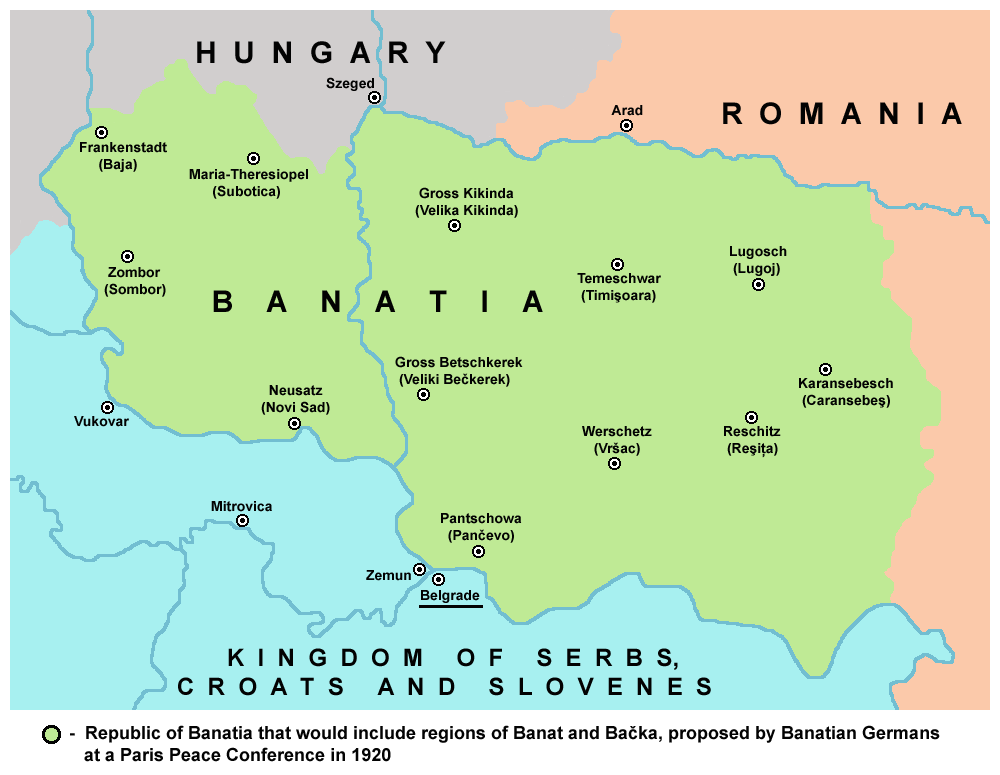
Republic of Banatia, proposed by Banatian Swabians at the Paris Peace Conference in 1920

Between 1941 and 1943, 2,150 ethnic German Bulgarian citizens were relocated to Germany as part of Hitler's Heim ins Reich policy. These included 164 Banat Swabians from Bardarski Geran and 33 from Gostilya.

The collapse of the Austro-Hungarian rule and its replacement by Romanian rule over the Banat after World War I had some benefits. In the late 19th century, Hungary had undergone a period of rapid Magyarization, during which it attempted to assimilate all of its minorities. Schools were required to teach only in the Hungarian language.

Under Romanian rule, Banat Swabians could have German-language schools again for the first time since 1868. Banat Swabian culture flourished. A German-language theatre operated in Timișoara, and across Banat, German-language newspapers were established. In 1921 a cultural association called the "Verband der Deutschen in Rumaenien" (Union of Germans in Romania) was founded.

Economically, however, things did not go well. The Wall Street crash and the subsequent financial crises of the Great Depression in the 1930s hit the Banat hard. Many Swabians left to work in Argentina, Brazil, and the United States, never to return.

After 1933, the Nazi Party gained some influence among the ethnic Germans of Eastern Europe, including the Banat Swabians. During World War II, many ethnic Germans were conscripted into the Romanian Army and served on the Eastern Front. After 1943, a German-Romanian treaty allowed them to serve instead in the Wehrmacht, without having to give up their Romanian citizenship. Initially, some were virtually forced to serve in the 7th SS Volunteer Mountain Division Prinz Eugen, fearing there would be sanctions against their families if they refused. After August 1941 Nazi Germany instituted involuntary conscription of Banat Swabians into the SS. Towards the end of the war, some Banat Swabians openly opposed the Nazis, who in retaliation publicly executed a group of them in Jimbolia (Hatzfeld).

Banat Swabians who served in the Prinz Eugen Division gained notoriety because of the division's war crimes against Jews and Serbs during the Banat (1941–1944) period. They became alienated and were distrusted by their non-Banat Swabian neighbors.

=== Life after 1944 ===
==== Romania ====
The Kingdom of Romania, formerly Nazi Germany's ally, joined the Allies on 23 August 1944. Overnight, all Banat Swabians in Romania became regarded as potential enemies of the state. The approach of the Red Army caused a flood of refugees to flee to the safety of Hitler's Germany.

By January 1945, Romania was completely under Soviet control. Early in 1945, under Stalin's orders, many Banat Swabians were expelled or deported to forced labor camps in the Soviet Union. Historian Alfred de Zayas estimates that a total of roughly 2 million people perished. Those who remained had their land confiscated and lost ownership of their homes (partially returned during the 1950s), while those who fled also lost their citizenship. In 1951 more than a thousand Banat Swabians were displaced to the Bărăgan Steppe of southeast Romania, where they founded new villages. Almost all were finally allowed to return home in 1956, but some were kept interned by force until 1963.

Some Swabian families from both Romanian and Yugoslavian Banat managed to flee to Germany and Austria as the Eastern Front closed in, as well as in the immediate postwar years. Many were resettled in the United States with the help of the American Aid Society. Others were helped by French Prime Minister Robert Schuman to settle in France as Français du Banat.

In the 1960s, however, the political atmosphere relaxed. The policy of disfranchising and dispossessing alleged Nazi collaborators within the German-speaking minority ended. Banat Swabians were extended the full rights of Romanian citizenship. Nevertheless, many Banat Swabians chose to use the looser conditions to emigrate to Germany, since they no longer trusted Romania's communist government's promises. The Transylvanian Saxons, who had lived in the region since the Middle Ages, made a similar decision. Even though the Swabian families of the Danube and Banat Swabians had lived there for ten generations or more, and their cultures had developed quite differently from Germany's, they no longer felt safe.

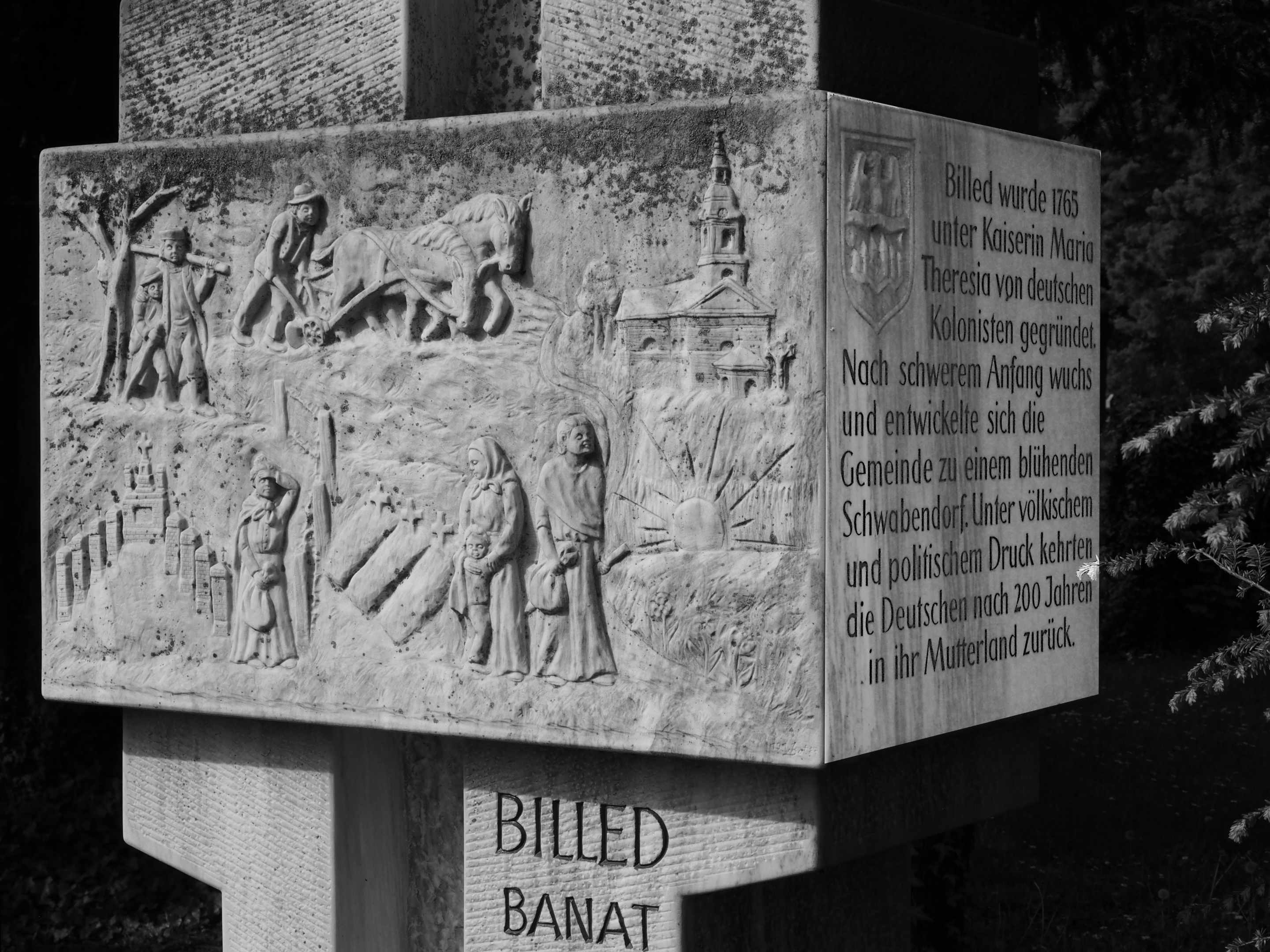
Memorial in Karlsruhe, Germany, for re-immigrants from Biled, Romania

In 1965, Nicolae Ceaușescu came to power in Romania. At first he opened the country to the West, but by the end of the 1970s, he had become ultra-nationalistic and an opponent of all ethnic minorities. Under his rule, any Banat Swabian who chose to emigrate had to pay a bounty of more than a thousand marks (depending on age and education) for a permanent emigration visa. Still, thousands of Banat Swabians left each year into the 1980s. An economic crisis of the communist state, as well as a rumor concerning a village destruction project, caused some 200,000 to flee Romania.

After Ceaușescu's fall in 1989 and German Reunification in 1990, almost all the remaining Banat Germans in Romania left for Germany. As a consequence, the ethnic German population in Romania is greatly reduced. Some are returning, generally entrepreneurs with economic ambitions supported by the German non-returnable grants for development projects outside Germany. Some former Banat Swabians now have a renewed desire to return to their long-time home, but most had to sell their property when they left and have no home to return to.

Of the 750,000 ethnic Germans who once lived in Romania, less than one-tenth of that number remain today. Only in cities with large populations is there still a functioning German cultural life, usually aided by uninterrupted Romanian State subsidies and help from ethnic Romanians. Still, the Allgemeine Deutsche Zeitung is a thriving weekly paper, and the German State Theater in Timișoara (Deutsches Staatstheater Temeswar), subsidized by the Romanian government, produces permanent theatre shows. In Timișoara and Arad, there are German-language primary and secondary schools, attended mostly by Romanian students. The remaining ethnic Germans (including Banat Swabians) in Romania are represented in politics by the DFDR or Demokratisches Forum der Deutschen in Rumänien (Democratic Forum of Germans in Romania).

==== Yugoslavia ====
While the Swabians from other areas of Yugoslavia escaped or were expelled, the destiny of Banat and Bačka Swabians was much less fortunate. Due to the high level of military conscription, mostly women, children and elderly people remained in the villages, and they were unwilling or unable to flee. Near the end of the war, all Swabians who were suspected of having been involved with the Nazi military administration were placed in provisional internment camps. Many were tortured, and at least 5,800 were killed. Others were used as forced labor. After Christmas in 1944, about 30,000 younger people, mostly women, were transferred to labor camps in the Soviet Union by train, escorted by communist partisans.

In the framework of agricultural reform, partisan families – mainly migrants from war-torn Bosnia, Lika and Montenegro— took over the confiscated Swabian farms and houses. In March 1945, the surviving Swabians were ghettoized in "village camps", later described as "extermination camps" by the survivors, where the death rate ranged as high as 50%.

The most notorious camp was at Knićanin (formerly Rudolfsgnad), where an estimated 11,000 to 12,500 Swabians died. The situation improved in 1947, when foreign humanitarian aid reached the camps, and their work routines were loosened. The camp system was closed in March 1948, with the surviving inmates being conscripted for forced labor in the army or industry. Their flight also was usually tolerated. By the end of the 1950s, about 300,000 Yugoslav Swabians had managed to emigrate to Western countries, including the United States.

According to a study conducted in 1961 by the German historian Hans-Ulrich Wehler, later supported by German emigrant organizations, at least 7,200 Swabians were executed by the Partisans, about 2,000 deported to the Soviet Union, and roughly 48,000 died in labor camps. About 16.8% of the Swabians in Yugoslavia died during and after the war.

The Serbian census from 2002 records only 3,901 Germans in Serbia, 3,154 of whom were in the province of Vojvodina. In December 2007 the remaining Swabians formed their own minority council in Novi Sad, having gained the required 3,000 voter signatures. The president, Andreas Biegermeier, stated the council would focus on property restitution, as well as marking mass graves and camp sites. He estimated the total number of remaining Danube Swabians in Serbia and their descendants as between 5,000 and 8,000.

==== Hungary ====
In Hungary fewer than 62,000 Danube Swabians remain, but they do have political representation. Expulsion of the Swabian minority from Hungary by the communist government, dictated by Soviet Union, took place between 1945 and 1948. As a result, many have assimilated and changed their ethnicity to become Magyars in Hungary as well as in Yugoslavia and Romania.

== Identity and culture ==
=== Swabians in emigration ===
The Banat Swabians who emigrated to Germany are generally well integrated into the society in which they live. They keep contact through cultural organisations (Landsmannschaften). In Vienna and in southern Germany, where most Banat Swabians now live, some maintain their customs and dialect, and offer support to those who remain in Romania.

Banat Swabians in the United States, whose ancestors emigrated beginning in the 1950s, have also formed community associations, including one in the New York metropolitan area, one in the Detroit area, and one in the Cincinnati area.

Others have created online communities like Donauschwaben Villages Helping Hands which is a non-profit to keep the Danube Swabian legacy alive and to connect families and relatives with their ancestry.

=== Magyarized Swabians ===
Today and centuries ago in the Kingdom of Hungary, Germans, Swabians and Saxons (Lutheran Germans) have mixed blood with the Magyars. About one grandparent of a Magyar today is of German origin; centuries ago it seemed to be more the rule than the exception. Borders are blurred, and famous individuals claim these two ethnicities, or even more sometimes. For example, composer Franz Schmidt appears to be Austro-German, but was 3/4-Magyar. János Kádár had a father (Kreisinger) who had mostly German ancestors. Cécile Tormay, author had a father, originally named Spiegel, with mostly Swabian ancestors. Zita Funkenhauser is of mixed Swabian-Magyar family She is a native Hungarian speaker (Her father was László and her mother Éva) and her Germany-born children speak Hungarian.

== People ==
- Geza von Cziffra, film director
- Helmut Duckadam, football goalkeeper, winner of European Cup and current record holder for most penalty kicks saved in a shootout
- Werner Fricker, President, United States Soccer Federation 1986–1990
- Franz Xaver Kappus (1883–1966), writer, poet, newspaper editor; Rainer Maria Rilke answered his request for advice with Letters to a Young Poet (1929)
- Stefan Jäger, painter
- Nikolaus Lenau, writer
- Herta Müller, poet, novelist and recipient of the 2009 Nobel Prize in Literature; her books deal with the lives of Swabians in Ceaușescu's Romania
- Anthony N. Michel, American engineering educator
- Johnny Weissmuller (born Johann Weißmüller), American actor; Olympic swimming gold medalist
- Michael J. Wendl, American engineer
- Stefan Hell, co-recipient of the 2014 Nobel Prize in Chemistry "for the development of super-resolved fluorescence microscopy"
- Zita Johann, Austrian-American actress (The Mummy)
- Tom Bischof, German professional footballer who plays as a midfielder or full-back for Bundesliga club Bayern Munich and the Germany national team.
- Hans-Thomas Tillschneider, German politician, member of the Alternative for Germany

== Sources ==
- The information in this article is based on and translated from that found in its German equivalent.
- German-speaking Europe
- Banat Swabians in Bulgaria: Nyagulov, Blagovest (1999). "Banatskite bǎlgari v Bǎlgarija". Banatskite bǎlgari: istorijata na edna malcinstvena obštnost vǎv vremeto na nacionalnite dǎržavi (in Bulgarian). Sofia: Paradigma. ISBN 954-9536-13-0.
- Tiberiu Schatteles, Evreii din Timișoara în perspectiva istorică, Editura "Hasefer" București, 2013
