= Murder of Alin Mario Berinde =

2026 killing in Romania

The Cenei killing was a case of killing that took place on 19 January 2026 in the village of Cenei, Timiș County, Romania. The 15-year-old adolescent Mario Alin Berinde was killed by three minors (two 15-year-old boys and one 13-year-old boy) through repeated blows with a hatchet and a knife, followed by the desecration of the body through an attempted burning and the burial of the corpse in the garden of one of the houses. The crime was premeditated for approximately one month, with the primary motive being envy toward the victim's social status and material possessions.

== Victim ==
Mario Alin Berinde (24 December 2010 – died 19 January 2026) was a 15-year-old adolescent from the commune of Cenei, Timiș County, and a student at the local middle school. He was described by classmates, teachers, and neighbors as kind-hearted, hardworking, and respectful. Mario came from a more affluent family than his attackers and was known for helping poorer classmates by lending them money or personal belongings. He was popular among his peers, achieved very high grades, and was actively involved in school and sports activities.

Mario was the top student in his class, achieved excellent grades, and was highly regarded by his teachers. His classmates described him as "the best among us," someone who lent money to poorer peers and helped those in difficulty. Mario's electric scooter, expensive phone, and branded sneakers were cited as sources of envy for his attackers.

== The incident ==
On 19 January 2026, at approximately 9:30 p.m., the victim, Mario Alin Berinde, was lured to the home of one of the suspects under the pretext of seeing a new ATV purchased by the 13-year-old minor. The ATV had been received as a Christmas gift from his father, who was working abroad in Spain, and was used to attract the victim. Berinde traveled to the house in the commune of Cenei using his electric scooter, according to footage captured by local surveillance cameras.

According to the forensic medical report, once inside the house the 13-year-old minor was the first to attack Berinde, striking him multiple times in the head with a hatchet. These blows caused severe brain injuries and were determined to be the primary cause of death. Subsequently, one of the 15-year-old minors inflicted several knife wounds on the victim; however, investigators reported that these injuries were superficial and not lethal in themselves.

Toxicological test results conducted on 21 January 2026 indicated that the 13-year-old minor had cannabis present in his system at the time of the attack. The presence of the substance was confirmed by analyses performed at the Child Neuropsychiatry Clinic in Timișoara.

Investigators reported that after the killing, the third 15-year-old minor joined the other two in acts intended to conceal the crime. The perpetrators attempted to burn the body using flammable substances; however, the attempt was only partially successful. The body was subsequently buried in the backyard of the house at a depth of approximately 50 centimeters (19 inches). According to investigators, a chicken was slaughtered inside the house, an act prosecutors stated was intended to obscure blood traces at the crime scene.

The victim's electric scooter remained in the possession of the perpetrators and was later found in the home of one of them. Berinde's mobile phone, waist bag, and keys were discarded in several areas of the village, actions which investigators stated initially complicated the search efforts.

=== Planning and motives ===
According to investigators, the killing had been planned approximately one month in advance, beginning in December 2025. The three minors waited for an opportune moment, taking advantage of the fact that the 13-year-old's father (the homeowner) had left to work abroad and that his mother was working a night shift. Investigators stated that the suspects monitored the family's movements in order to select a suitable day for the attack.

Prosecutors and media reports identified envy as the primary motive for the crime. Berinde came from a more affluent family and was known among peers for possessing expensive items such as a mobile phone, branded sneakers, and an electric scooter. Reports stated that the perpetrators, who came from more disadvantaged social backgrounds, were disturbed by the victim's higher social status. Berinde was described as the top student in his class, popular, and actively involved in helping less fortunate classmates, factors cited by investigators as contributing to the attackers' jealousy.

=== Prior incidents involving the perpetrators ===
The two 15-year-old minors involved in the attack had previously been the subject of a complaint for physical assault against an 18-year-old boy. The incident occurred in December 2025, and the victim reported the assault to the Cenei Police Station on 23 December 2025, alleging that he had been physically attacked by the two minors outside the built-up area of the commune. Police opened a criminal case for assault or other acts of violence.

On 14 January 2026, five days before the killing, the injured party withdrew the complaint. Under Romanian law governing the offense of assault or other acts of violence, the continuation of criminal proceedings is conditional upon the will of the injured party; as a result, the case was dismissed.

Police later stated that the same two 15-year-old minors were subsequently investigated for the killing of Alin Mario Berinde, indicating a history of violent behavior prior to the killing.

According to later statements by the father of the December 2025 assault victim, the complaint had been withdrawn under pressure from the parents of the minors involved.

== Context ==
=== Background and behaviour ===
The 13-year-old minor identified by investigators as the principal perpetrator was a youth player at LPS Banatul Timișoara, a football academy known for developing players who later reached top-tier competitions, including the Romanian SuperLiga. He initially played for the local team AS Bobda and was selected at the age of 10 by coach Ciprian Manolache. He later transferred to LPS Banatul, where he played as a central defender or midfielder.

Despite his physical and athletic potential, the minor reportedly exhibited violent and impulsive behavior. Coach Ciprian Manolache described repeated aggressive incidents during training sessions and matches:

"The problems with violence were evident. When he became angry on the pitch, he intentionally hit other children, even when the ball was not in play. I would take him off and make him run laps. He repeatedly lost control and had conflicts with teammates."

Manolache further stated that the issues extended beyond physical aggression to emotional instability:

"He was talented, but he could not control his emotions and aggression."

The minor was later excluded from the team due to repeated absences, although reports noted that these absences may have been linked to negative peer influence.

== Investigation and legal measures ==
=== Pretrial detention of the 15-year-old minors ===
The two 15-year-old minors involved in the killing of Mario Alin Berinde were detained for 24 hours by prosecutors from the Timiș Tribunal Prosecutor's Office on 21 January 2026. After the detention period expired, they were brought before a judge with a request for pretrial detention. On 22 January 2026, the court ordered 30 days of pretrial detention for both minors, a decision that was later upheld on appeal.

Authorities reported that the charges against the two minors differed:

- The 15-year-old minor who attacked the victim with a knife was charged with aggravated murder and desecration of a corpse. According to the forensic medical report, the victim sustained knife wounds; however, these were described as superficial in comparison to the hatchet blows. Under Romanian law, the offense carries a statutory maximum penalty of up to 25 years' imprisonment, subject to reduction due to the offender's status as a minor.
- The second 15-year-old minor, who assisted in the concealment of the crime, was charged with desecration of a corpse and aiding the perpetrator. Prosecutors stated that he did not directly participate in the attack but assisted in the attempted burning and burial of the body.

Both minors filed appeals against the pretrial detention order, which were examined in the following days; the detention decision was maintained.

The forensic medical report concluded that the victim's death was caused primarily by multiple severe hatchet blows to the head, resulting in grave brain injuries, while the knife wounds were superficial and not lethal in themselves.

=== Situation of the 13-year-old minor ===
The 13-year-old minor identified by investigators as the principal perpetrator is not criminally liable for the acts committed, pursuant to Article 113(1) of the Romanian Criminal Code, which provides that persons who have not reached the age of 14 do not bear criminal responsibility, the law establishing an absolute presumption of lack of discernment for criminal imputability.

On 22 January 2026, the Prosecutor's Office attached to the Timiș Tribunal notified the General Directorate of Social Assistance and Child Protection (DGASPC) Timiș in order to initiate protective measures under Law No. 272/2004. Under this law, the only measures available for a child under the age of 14 who has committed a criminal act are placement or specialized supervision.

On the same date, the Timiș Child Protection Commission, operating under the Timiș County Council, imposed the measure of specialized supervision on the minor pursuant to Decision No. 29/22.01.2026.

DGASPC Timiș stated on 26 January 2026 that it was awaiting the results of the minor's medical and neuropsychiatric evaluations in order to determine the appropriate intervention measures. The institution noted that it does not operate a specialized center for minors who have committed criminal acts but are not criminally liable.

The minor was initially placed at the Child Neuropsychiatry Clinic for medical and psychological evaluations. On 27 January 2026, DGASPC Timiș announced that the evaluations were ongoing and that the family had selected a location where the minor would be continuously monitored.

Authorities stated that the child was withdrawn from public view and placed in a location designated by DGASPC under constant supervision. Under applicable regulations, the family may select the monitoring location, while medical evaluations determine whether institutionalization in a specialized placement center is required.

On 28 January 2026, the Timiș County Council announced plans to establish a special center for minors involved in serious criminal acts, citing DGASPC Timiș's limited capacity to manage cases of severe juvenile delinquency. The president of the County Council, Alfred Simonis, stated that the proposed center would complement existing social assistance structures.

=== Drugs and DIICOT investigation ===
On 21 January 2026, the 13-year-old minor tested positive for cannabis. Following this result, the Directorate for Investigating Organized Crime and Terrorism (DIICOT) Timișoara initiated an in rem criminal investigation concerning the trafficking of risk drugs and the possession of drugs for personal use.

According to investigators, beginning in the summer of 2025, a 24-year-old man allegedly supplied cannabis to the 13-year-old minor and to other minors aged between 13 and 15, including the two 15-year-old minors involved in the killing. On 24 January 2026, DIICOT conducted searches in the commune of Cenei with the support of officers from the Brigade for Combating Organized Crime (BCCO) Timișoara and gendarmes.

Searches were carried out at three locations in Cenei. At the residence of the primary suspect, authorities reported the seizure of the following items:

- approximately 110 grams of cannabis
- a grinder
- an electronic scale
- other evidentiary materials

=== Suspects in the drug trafficking case ===
The DIICOT investigation focused on two individuals:

==== 24-year-old man (alleged primary supplier) ====
- Charge: trafficking of risk drugs in continuous form
- Status: detained by DIICOT on 24 January 2026; on 25 January 2026, a judge ordered 30 days of pretrial detention
- Authorities stated that he denied the accusations, claiming the seized drugs were intended for personal use, an explanation contested by investigators based on the evidence collected

==== 17-year-old adolescent (alleged intermediary) ====
- Charge: trafficking of risk drugs in continuous form
- Status: detained on 24 January 2026; on 25 January 2026, prosecutors ordered judicial control instead of pretrial detention
- Investigators alleged that he supplied cannabis to minors aged 13–15 and occasionally consumed the substance together with them

=== Additional suspects ===
DIICOT also reported that two other young men from Cenei were detained on suspicion of drug trafficking and possible links to the case, although their precise role remained under investigation as of 30 January 2026.

According to evidence gathered by DIICOT, the alleged trafficking network had been operating since the summer of 2025, with the 24-year-old suspect repeatedly supplying cannabis to the 17-year-old intermediary, who then distributed or consumed it together with other minors in the commune. Investigators stated that the substances allegedly reached the three minors involved in the killing of Mario Berinde, as well as other minors in the area.

== Reactions and aftermath ==
The killing generated strong reactions at both local and national levels and prompted public debate regarding juvenile criminal responsibility in Romania. Residents of Cenei and neighboring localities expressed fear and concern following the revelation that the 13-year-old minor identified by investigators as the principal perpetrator could not be held criminally liable under the current legal framework.

The case received extensive media coverage and triggered discussions in civil society, on social media, and among legal experts regarding the adequacy of existing legislation governing serious violent offenses committed by minors.

=== "Mario Law" petition ===
In the aftermath of the crime, an online petition informally referred to as "Mario Law" was launched by Lavinia Bichler. By 30 January 2026, the petition had gathered more than 250,000 signatures, becoming one of the most widely signed petitions in Romania in recent years.

The petition called for substantial amendments to the Romanian Criminal Code, including:

- lowering the age of criminal liability to 10 years for murder and aggravated murder, subject to the demonstration of intent, premeditation, and discernment through forensic psychiatric evaluation;
- eliminating automatic exemption from criminal liability based solely on age in cases involving offenses against life;
- allowing courts to apply the maximum penalties provided by law for aggravated murder when statutory conditions are met;
- removing mandatory mitigation based on minority in cases of extreme gravity, provided discernment is established.

The petition was submitted to the Romanian Parliament, the Ministry of Justice, and the Ombudsman.

=== Political and legislative reactions ===
On 26 January 2026, the Minister of Justice, Radu Marinescu, described the killing in Cenei as "a shocking crime that horrified public opinion" and announced the establishment of a multidisciplinary working group within the Ministry of Justice to analyze the legal framework governing juvenile criminal responsibility.

According to the Ministry of Justice, the working group included representatives of the Prosecutor General's Office, the Superior Council of Magistracy, the National Administration of Penitentiaries, and other institutions. Its mandate included evaluating existing legislation, examining the possibility of lowering the statutory age of criminal liability, and conducting comparative legal analyses with other European states.

=== Positions of lawmakers ===
Lawmakers from multiple political parties expressed divergent views regarding potential amendments to the Criminal Code in response to the case.

Supporters of legislative changes argued that the existing legal framework lacked adequate tools for addressing extreme cases of juvenile violence and emphasized the need for clearer mechanisms of intervention and supervision.

Opponents cautioned against lowering the age of criminal responsibility, warning that legislative changes adopted under emotional pressure could produce unintended legal and social consequences. They instead advocated strengthening child protection, prevention mechanisms, and therapeutic interventions within the existing system.

=== Other reactions ===
The mayor of Sânmihaiu Român stated that he had received information from local residents suggesting that the family of the 13-year-old minor might intend to take the child out of the country, possibly to Spain, while emphasizing that the information was not officially confirmed by authorities.

Tensions were reported in the locality, and on 25 January 2026 a protest took place in Sânmihaiu Român, requiring police intervention.

The Ministry of Internal Affairs issued a public clarification denying false information circulating online that alleged the minor had been removed from custody to be "judged by citizens," stating that no such events had occurred and that the claims constituted disinformation.

Authorities also confirmed that the family of the 13-year-old minor had received threats from members of the public. In response, child protection services implemented special protective measures, including relocation and restricted access to in-person schooling, in order to prevent further escalation and ensure the safety of all parties involved.
