= Jimbolia Veche oil field =

Oil field in Timiș County, Romania

Jimbolia Veche
- Country: Romania
- Region: Timiș County
- Offshore/onshore: onshore
- Operator: Zeta Petroleum

Field history
- Discovery: 1980
- Start of development: 1980
- Start of production: 1980

Production
- Current production of oil: 120 barrels per day (~6,000 t/a)
- Estimated oil in place: 2.54 million tonnes (~ 2.96×10^{6} m^{3} or 18.6 million bbl)

The Jimbolia Veche oil field is an oil field located in Jimbolia, Timiș County. It was discovered in 1980 and developed by Zeta Petroleum. It began production in 1980 and produces oil. The total proven reserves of the Jimbolia Veche oil field are around 18.6 million barrels (2.54 million tonnes), and production is centered on 120 barrels per day (19 m^{3}/d).
