= German World Alliance =

International organization of Germans abroad

German World Alliance (GWA) (in German: Deutsche Weltallianz (DWA)) is the only worldwide organization of the Germans abroad. The GWA was founded 2002 in Washington, D.C., where it still has its main office.

== Mission ==
The GWA aims to support human rights of Germans worldwide, to enhance the exchange of information and communication among the Germans worldwide and to preserve the use of the German language and German culture. Since 2008 its president is Peter Wassertheurer from Austria,

The GWA is the umbrella organization of numerous member German diaspora associations in USA, Canada, Argentina, Columbia, Germany, Austria, Switzerland, Great Britain, Poland and Serbia The GWA describes itself as "the greatest human rights organization of the Germans worldwide". The GWA also cooperates with German embassies, consulates and cultural organizations abroad.

== Member organizations (a selection) ==
- Landesverband der Donauschwaben USA (Danube Swabians)
- Institute for German-American Relations (IGAR), Pittsburgh, Pennsylvania
- German Canadian Congress (Deutsch-Kanadischer Kongress DKK), president Tony Bergmeier, Kitchener, Ontario
- Federación de Asociaciones Argentino-Germanas" (Federation of Argentine-German Association), FAAG, Buenos Aires
- Österreichische Landsmannschaft (ÖLM)
- Federation of the German communities in Austria
- Federation of German social cultural associations in Poland, president Bernard Gaida
- Carpathian German association

The German World Alliance is also connected with the "Association for German Cultural Relations with Abroad" which is a contact center between Germany and the about 14 million Germans abroad who still adhere to their German ancestry, culture and language.

== Board ==
- President (since 2008): Dr. Peter Wassertheurer, Austria
- Vice president: Dr. Kearn C. Schemm, USA
- Treasurer: Dr. Herbert Traxler, President of the American-Austrian Society
- Secretary (since 2004): Prof. Dr. Reinhold Reimann, Austria

The board members (about 12) represent the various member organizations. The next Annual Assembly of the GWA in autumn 2015 with the election of a new board team is planned after long in Washington D.C. again.

== Activities ==
In declarations, lectures and publications the representatives of the GWA turn against the thesis of the collective guilt of the Germans and their discrimination in some countries. In particular, they condemn the expulsion of Germans from the eastern regions and the countries of Eastern Europe while Allied war crimes stay unpunished. The GWA signed in the Vienna Declaration on Human Rights of November 29, 2005, and also signed the Triest Declaration of March 31, 2007, on the "Charter of Expellees and Refugees of Europe".

In addition, the GWA calls for the rehabilitation and compensation of unjustly interned Germans in North and South America during the two world wars. In this matter on April 30, 2009, the GWA sent a letter specifically to President Barack Obama with the request of acknowledgement and compensation. The GWA tries to spread an "objective" account of the German history in schools and media abroad and to preserve the German language and cultural heritage in the diaspora.

The GWA requested from the Canadian government rehabilitation and compensation for the internment of thousands of Canadian citizens only because of their ethnic descent during both World Wars. The GWA also supported the complaints of the German-Canadian Congress against the concept of the Canadian Museum for Human Rights to present mainly the Holocaust. Instead they requested together with the Ukrainian Canadian Congress the presentation of all mass murders and human right abuses such as Holodomor in Ukraine, genocide against Armenians and massacres in Rwanda. The GWA also wanted the expulsion of 14 million Germans at the end of the Second World War to be included in the Museum's presentation.

The GWA sees itself as "guardian" of German language and culture in the diaspora, while also criticizing some developments in present Germany.

== See also ==
- German diaspora
- Danube Swabians
- Ukrainian World Congress
- World Jewish Congress
