= Checea =

- Commune
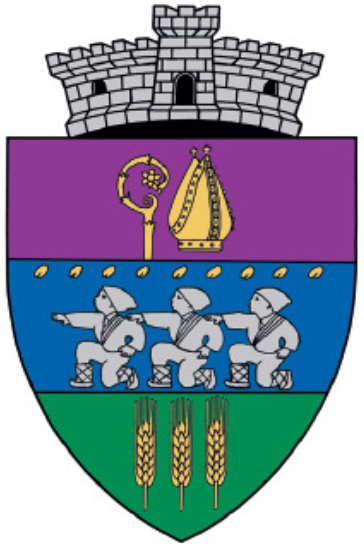
- Coat of arms

- Location in Timiș County

- Location in Romania
- Coordinates: 45°45′N 20°50′E
- Country: Romania
- County: Timiș

Government
  - Mayor (2024–): Ioan Breje (PSD)
- Area: 57.07 km^{2} (22.03 sq mi)
- Elevation: 286 m (938 ft)
- Population (2021-12-01): 2,238
  - Density: 39.21/km^{2} (101.6/sq mi)
- Time zone: UTC+02:00 (EET)
  - Summer (DST): UTC+03:00 (EEST)
- Postal code: 307102
- Vehicle reg.: TM
- Website: primariachecea.ro

Checea (Hungarian: Nagykőcse; German: Ketscha; Serbian: Кеча, romanized: Keča; Croatian: Keča) is a commune in Timiș County, Romania. It is composed of a single village, Checea, part of the commune of Cenei until 2004, when it was split off.

== Geography ==
Checea is located in the west of Timiș County, 37 km (23 mi) from Timișoara and 16 km (9.9 mi) from Jimbolia, the nearest town. It borders the commune of Cărpiniș to the north, the village of Bobda to the east, Serbia to the southwest and the commune of Uivar to the south.

=== Climate ===
Checea's climate is classified as warm and temperate. The thermal regime is moderate, due to the oceanic and Mediterranean influences. In general, winters are mild and short; the first snow falls on average on 29 November, and the last falls around mid-March. The number of days with snow cover is on average less than 30 per year, due to the penetration of warm air from the south, and the thickness of the snow layer is reduced, around 5 cm (2 in). Summers are warmer and longer than other in lowland areas. The coldest month of the year is January, with an average temperature of −1.5 °C (29.3 °F). July is the warmest month of the year; the temperature in July averages 21.6 °C (70.9 °F). The multiannual average precipitation reaches 570–600 mm (22–24 in). Most precipitation falls in summer (about 30%), followed by spring, autumn and winter (about 20%).

=== Flora and fauna ===
The vegetation found here is specific to the forest-steppe. The area is devoid of forests, the species of scattered trees being typical of mixed foliage forests. The spontaneous grassy vegetation is restricted to pastures, obligatory hayfields and some salty lands. There are associations of plants made of ryegrass (Lolium perenne), dog's tooth grass (Cynodon dactylon), fescue (Festuca spp.), mugwort (Artemisia spp.), bird's-foot trefoil (Lotus corniculatus), dandelion (Taraxacum officinale), cypress spurge (Euphorbia cyparissias), white clover (Trifolium repens), and on the lands affected by salinization there are also characteristic species: statice (Limonium spp.), vipergrass (Scorzonera spp.), sea aster (Tripolium pannonicum), chamomile (Matricaria spp.), etc. In the portions of land with groundwater closer to the surface cock's-foot (Dactylis glomerata), meadow foxtail (Alopecurus pratensis), buttercups (Ranunculus spp.) are frequently found, and in the swampy micro-depressions and in the canal beds there are bulrushes (Typha latifolia), reeds (Phragmites australis), rushes (Juncus spp.), etc. The most common crop species are wheat, barley, corn, sunflower, soy, sugar beet, horseradish, lucerne, clover, hemp and a number of vegetables.

The fauna is of Central European type, with penetrations and a mixture of species coming from Northern, Southern and Eastern Europe:

- rodents: susliks, hamsters, mole rats, hares;
- large mammals: deer;
- carnivores: polecats, foxes, badgers;
- birds: larks, partridges, bustards, storks, starlings, pheasants, sparrowhawks;
- fish: carps, Prussian carps, bleaks, pikes, catfish.

== History ==
Today's village was formed by merging Checea Croată ("Croatian Checea"; Croatian: Hrvatska Keča) and Checea Română ("Romanian Checea"). Initially, there was only one settlement, attested in 1470 as Kewche, as the property of Blasiusz Szati's family, and later of the Desi brothers (Ladislau, Petru and Ioan). During the Turkish occupation it was inhabited by Romanians, but at the time of the conquest of Banat by the Austrians, it had only eight houses. After 1717, a large part of its territory was under the rule of the Catholic diocese of Zagreb, and the rest of the Austrian state in the form of titula precaria, a form of feudal servitude that lasted until the 1890s. Checea was practically re-established in 1738 and had a mixed Romanian-Serbian character.

The construction of the Orthodox church in 1772 gave rise to many dissensions between Romanians and Serbs. Therefore, the village of Checea Croată was established in 1802 on the outskirts of the old settlement, which from then on will be called Checea Română. Croatian families began to settle in the newly established Checea Croată, on the estates of an agricultural owner. The two villages will remain separated for more than a century. Immediately after the union of Banat with Romania, the border area will be disputed by Romania and Yugoslavia. In 1919, Checea Croată was transferred to Yugoslavia, the border being established between the two localities, sometimes passing through people's households. The situation was remedied on 3 January 1924, when, following negotiations between Romania and Yugoslavia, Checea Croată was annexed to Checea Română. From 1924 until 1930, the locality is administered by two town halls, i.e. by two mayors and two notaries, one for Checea Română and another for Checea Croată. Between 1921 and 1972, Checea had the status of commune, after which it was incorporated into the commune of Cenei. It regained this status through Law no. 84 of 5 April 2004.

== Demographics ==
Ethnic composition (2021)
1. Romanians (51.8%)
2. Roma (37.1%)
3. Hungarians (2.85%)
4. Serbs (1.07%)
5. Unknown (6.34%)
6. Others (0.83%)
Religious composition (2021)
1. Orthodox (84.9%)
2. Roman Catholics (4.46%)
3. Pentecostals (2.32%)
4. Unknown (6.47%)
5. Others (1.64%)
6. Irreligious, atheists and agnostics (0.17%)

Checea had a population of 2,238 inhabitants at the 2021 census, up 21.76% from the 2011 census. Most inhabitants are Romanians (51.78%), larger minorities being represented by Roma (37.13%), Hungarians (2.85%) and Serbs (1.07%). For 6.34% of the population, ethnicity is unknown. By religion, most inhabitants are Orthodox (84.94%), but there are also minorities of Roman Catholics (4.46%) and Pentecostals (2.32%). For 6.47% of the population, religious affiliation is unknown.

Census		Ethnic composition
Year	Population	Romanians	Hungarians	Germans	Roma	Serbs	Croats
1880	3,340	1,808	113	322	–	1,012	–
1890	3,645 (Note: Including data on Hetin's population, which now belongs to Serbia)	1,911	182	348	135	660	486
1900	3,628	1,876	219	372	125	552	480
1910	3,254	1,499	191	241	162	731	428
1920	2,331 (Note: Data on Checea Croată's population missing)	1,495	73	143	–	–	–
1930	3,045	1,509	392	221	152	748	–
1941	3,142	1,353	581	214	–	–	–
1956	2,535	–	–	–	–	–	–
1966	2,398	1,635	304	39	–	417	–
1977	2,274	1,270	275	42	345	209	133
1992	1,812	1,060	188	29	377	77	62
2002	1,931	1,131	136	16	539	55	51
2011	1,838	966	106	14	546	52	30
2021	2,238	1,159	64	–	831	24	15

== Politics and administration ==
The commune of Checea is administered by a mayor and a local council composed of 11 councilors. The mayor, Ioan Breje, from the Social Democratic Party, has been in office since 2024. As from the 2024 local elections, the local council has the following composition by political parties:

Party	Seats	Composition
Social Democratic Party	6	
National Liberal Party	3	
Alliance for the Union of Romanians	2	

== Notable people ==
- Gheorghe Saru (1920–2003), painter
- Tiberiu Giulvezan (1949–2011), poet
