= Danube Swabians =

Historical ethnic German population

Donauschwaben

Total population
- 230,000 (estimated)

Regions with significant populations
- Hungary: 186,596
- Romania: 36,884
- Serbia: 2,573
- Croatia: 2,965

Languages
- Hungarian, Romanian, Serbo-Croatian, German

Religion
- Roman Catholic majority, Lutheran minority

Related ethnic groups
- Germans of Hungary, Germans of Romania, Germans of Serbia, Germans of Croatia, Banat Swabians, Satu Mare Swabians

The Danube Swabians (German: Donauschwaben [ˈdoːnaʊʃvaːbm̩]) are an ethnic German population whose ancestors settled in the middle and lower Danube basin of east-central Europe during the 17th and 18th centuries, primarily under the recruitment of the Habsburg monarchy. Settlers came from various southwestern and central regions within the Holy Roman Empire, including Swabia, for which the group is named, as well as Alsace, Austria, Bavaria, Franconia, Hesse, and the Palatinate.

Ethnic Germans first moved to the Kingdom of Hungary in the 12th century, but Danube Swabians moved in high numbers during the 17th and 18th centuries as part of an effort by the Habsburg monarchy to repopulate the valleys around the Danube and restore agriculture after the expulsion of the Ottoman Empire in the Ottoman–Habsburg wars. They were able to keep their language and religion and initially developed strongly German communities in the region which retained the German language, customs, and folklore. After the collapse of Austria-Hungary in 1918 following World War I, the areas where the Danube Swabians had settled were divided into Hungary, Romania, and Yugoslavia.

In the 1930s, Nazi Germany promoted its ideology among the Danube Swabians. The regime claimed the right to protect them as Volksdeutsche (as opposed to Reichsdeutsche) as part of its reason for expanding into eastern Europe. After World War II, the remaining Danube Swabians were disenfranchised, their property seized, and many were deported to labor camps in the Soviet Union. Hungary expelled half of its ethnic German population. In Yugoslavia, the local German population was collectively blamed for collaboration with Nazi Germany. Many Yugoslav Danube Swabians were executed by partisan forces immediately after the war, and survivors were later confined to labor and internment camps.

Of the 1.4 to 1.5 million pre-war population of Danube Swabians, the overwhelming majority of the survivors resettled in German-speaking countries: about 660,000 in Germany and about 150,000 in Austria. Danube Swabians also resettled in the United States, Canada, Brazil, Argentina, and Australia. In the 21st century, they are made up of ethnic Germans from many former and present-day countries: Germans of Hungary; Satu Mare Swabians; Germans of Croatia, Bačka, the Banat Swabians; and the Vojvodina Germans of Vojvodina and Slavonia, especially those in the Osijek region. However, the Carpathian Germans and Transylvanian Saxons are not included within the Danube Swabian group.

== Name ==
The Danube Swabians were given their German name by German ethnographers in the early 20th century. In German they called themselves Schwowe. In Serbo-Croatian, Danube Swabians, alongside the local populace would refer to themselves as Švabo (Serbo-Croatian for "of Swabia") or Nijemci / Nemci (Serbo-Croatian for "Germans"), referring to their ethnic origin.

== History ==
=== Origins ===
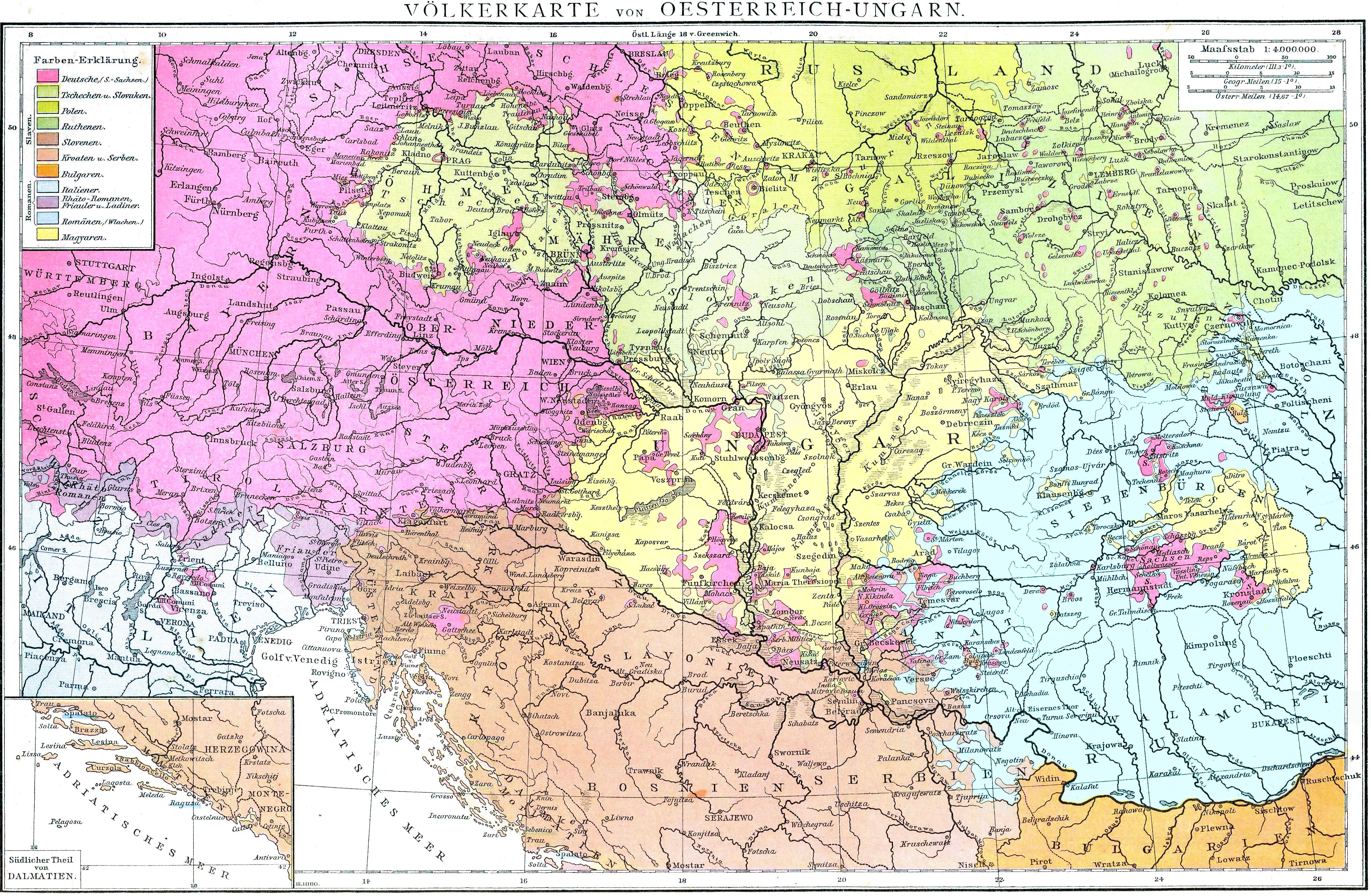
Settlement areas of the Danube Swabians (German-speaking areas in the Pannonian Basin)

Beginning in the 12th century, German merchants and miners began to settle in the Kingdom of Hungary at the invitation of the Hungarian monarchy (see Ostsiedlung). Although there were significant colonies of Carpathian Germans in the Spiš mountains and Transylvanian Saxons in Transylvania, German settlement throughout the rest of the kingdom had not been extensive until this time.

During the 17th and 18th centuries, the Ottoman–Habsburg wars between the Habsburg monarchy and the Ottoman Empire devastated and depopulated much of the lands of the Danube valley, referred to geographically as the Pannonian plain. The Habsburgs, who ruled the Archduchy of Austria, Kingdom of Hungary, and Holy Roman Empire at the time, resettled the land with Germanic settlers from the southwestern and central German regions of Swabia, for which the Danube Swabian ethnic group is named, as well as Alsace, Austria, Bavaria, Franconia, Hesse (especially Fulda), the Hunsrück area, the Palatinate, and the Rhön Mountains area. DNA test examples of Danube Swabians from Hungary shows their German ancestry.

Despite differing origins, the new immigrants were all referred as Swabians by their neighbor Croats, Serbs, Hungarians, and Romanians, because the majority of the first settlers were Swabians. The Bačka settlers called themselves Schwove. The majority of them boarded boats in Ulm, Swabia, and traveled to their new destinations down the Danube River in boats called Ulmer Schachteln. The Austro-Hungarian Empire had given them funds to build their boats for transport. The total number of German settlers who emigrated from different parts of Germany to Hungary between 1686 and 1829 is estimated at 150,000. The official name Danube Swabians has been used for this population group since 1922.

=== Settlement ===
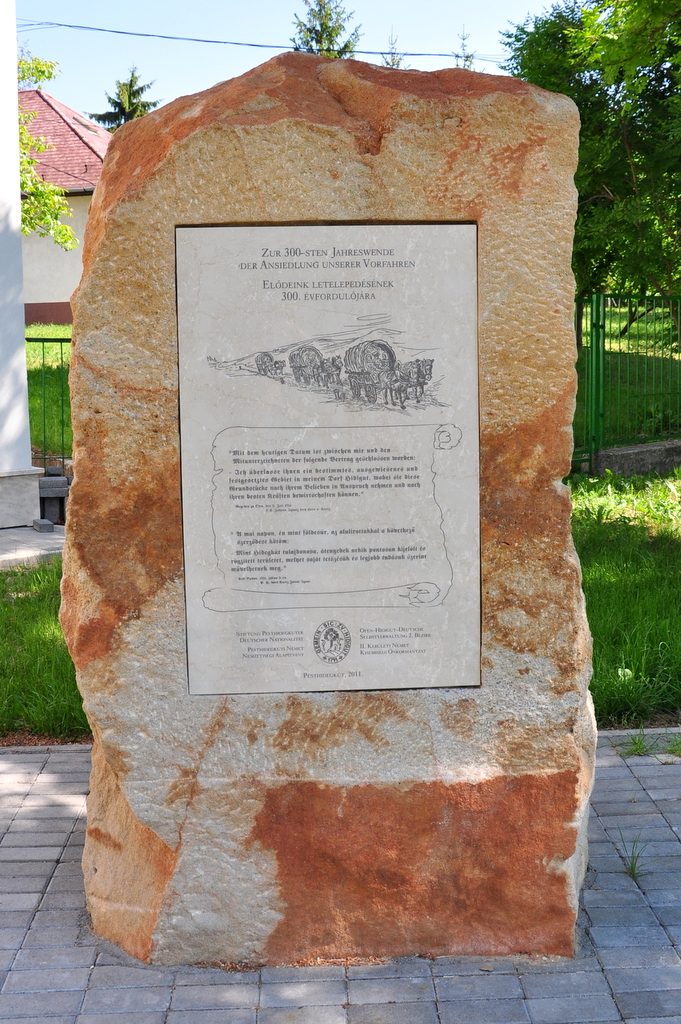
Monument commemorating the 300th anniversary of German settlers in Pesthidegkúti, Budapest, Hungary

The first wave of invited resettlement came after the Ottoman Turks were gradually being forced back after their defeat at the Battle of Vienna in 1683. The settlement was encouraged by nobility, whose lands had been devastated through warfare, and by military officers including Prince Eugene of Savoy and Claudius Mercy. Many Germans settled in the Bakony (Bakonywald) and Vértes (Schildgebirge) mountains north and west of Lake Balaton (Plattensee), as well as around the capital city, Buda (Ofen), now part of Budapest. The area of heaviest German colonization during this period was in the Swabian Turkey (Schwäbische Türkei), a triangular region between the Danube River, Lake Balaton, and the Drava (Drau) River. Other areas settled during this time by Germans were Pécs (Fünfkirchen), Satu Mare (Sathmar), and south of Mukachevo (Munkatsch).

After the Habsburgs annexed the Banat area from the Ottomans in the Treaty of Passarowitz (1718), the government made plans to resettle the region to restore farming. It became known as the Banat of Temesvár (Temeschwar/Temeschburg), as well as the Bačka (Batschka) region between the Danube and Tisza (Theiss) rivers. Fledgling settlements were destroyed during the Austro-Turkish War of 1737–1739, but extensive colonization continued after the suspension of hostilities.

The Stifoller or Stiffolder, practitioners of Folk Catholicism, settled on the Danube in some 25–30 Villages at Baranya County and 4 villages in Tolna County of southwest Hungary between 1717 and 1804, mostly in 1720 Their ancestors once came from the Diocese of Fulda at Fulda and the surrounding Rhön Mountains in Germany. (Note: Stiffoller kept their German tradition and a special dialect until today, called Stiffollerisch, resembling the South Hessian dialect of Schlüchtern in Germany, A street in Petersberg, Hesse near Fulda is given the name, Stiffollerweg.)

After Maria Theresa of Austria assumed the thrones of queen of Hungary, archduchess of Austria, and queen of Bohemia in 1740, she encouraged vigorous colonization on Hungarian crown lands, especially between Timișoara and the Tisza. The Crown agreed to permit the Germans to retain their language and religion, generally Roman Catholic. The German farmers steadily redeveloped the land: drained marshes near the Danube and the Tisza, rebuilt farms, and constructed roads and canals. Many Danube Swabians served on Austria's Military Frontier (Militärgrenze) against the Ottomans. Between 1740 and 1790, more than 100,000 Germans immigrated to the Kingdom of Hungary. Under the reign of Joseph II, Holy Roman Emperor, Lutheran Germans, mainly from Hesse, Palatinate and Lower Saxony, were also allowed to settle in Hungary and other parts of the Habsburg empire. In the various Danube Swabian dialects they were locally referred as Lutherische (Lutheran). Late 18th-century resettlement was accomplished through private and state initiatives.

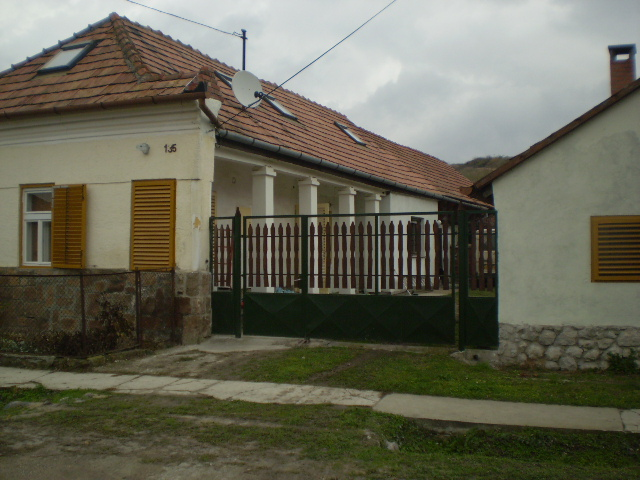
Traditional Swabian house in Egerszalók, Hungary

The Habsburgs unified their possessions as the Austrian Empire in 1804. The Napoleonic Wars ended the large-scale movement of Germans to the Hungarian lands, although the colonial population increased steadily and was self-sustaining through natural increase. Small daughter-colonies developed in Slavonia and Bosnia. After the creation of Austria-Hungary in 1867, Hungary established a policy of Magyarization whereby minorities, including the Danube Swabians, were induced by political and economic means to adopt the Magyar language and culture.

Beginning in 1893, Banat Swabians began to move to Bulgaria, where they settled in the village of Bardarski Geran, Vratsa Province, founded by Banat Bulgarians several years prior to that. Their number later exceeded 90 families. They built a separate Roman Catholic church in 1929 due to conflicts with the Bulgarian Catholics. Some of these Germans later moved to Tsarev Brod, Shumen Province, together with a handful of Banat Bulgarian families, as well as to another Banat Bulgarian village, Gostilya, Pleven Province.

After the treaties of Saint-Germain (1919) and Trianon (1920) following World War I, the Banat was divided between Romania, Yugoslavia, and Hungary; Bačka was divided between Yugoslavia and Hungary; and Satu Mare went to Romania. Before World War II, the biggest populations of Germans in the Vojvodina were at Hodschag, Werbass, and Apatin.

There were approximately two million ethnic Danube Swabians in the region before World War II. In Romania, census of 1930 recorded 745,421 Germans; Hungarian Census of 1933 recorded 477,153; and Yugoslavian Census of 1921, 513,472. German estimations from the interwar period place those estimations at 850,000; 600,000 and 620,000 for Romania, Hungary and Yugoslavia respectively.

=== World War II, expulsion, and post-war ===
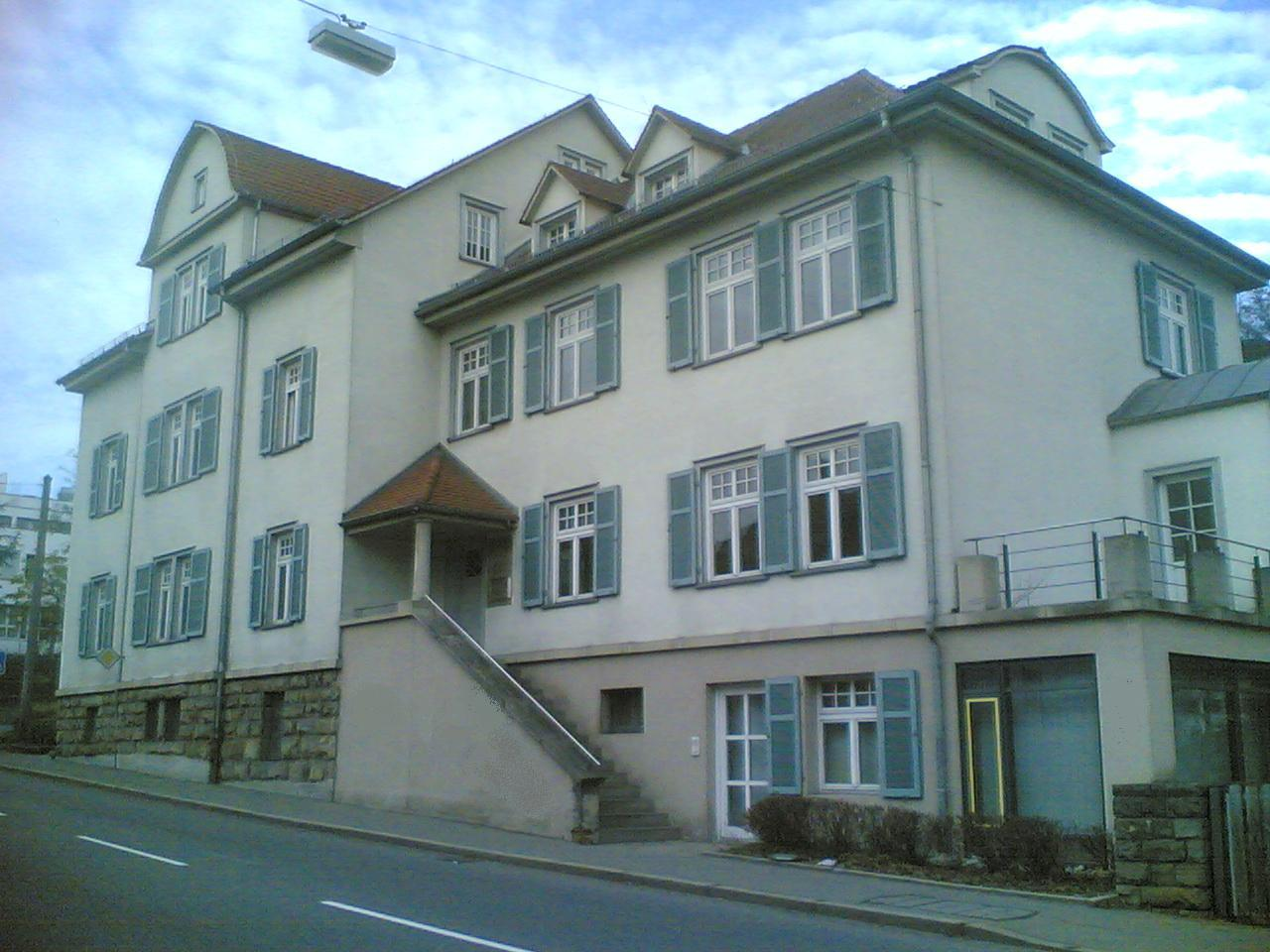
Institute for Danube Swabian history and geography, Tübingen, Germany

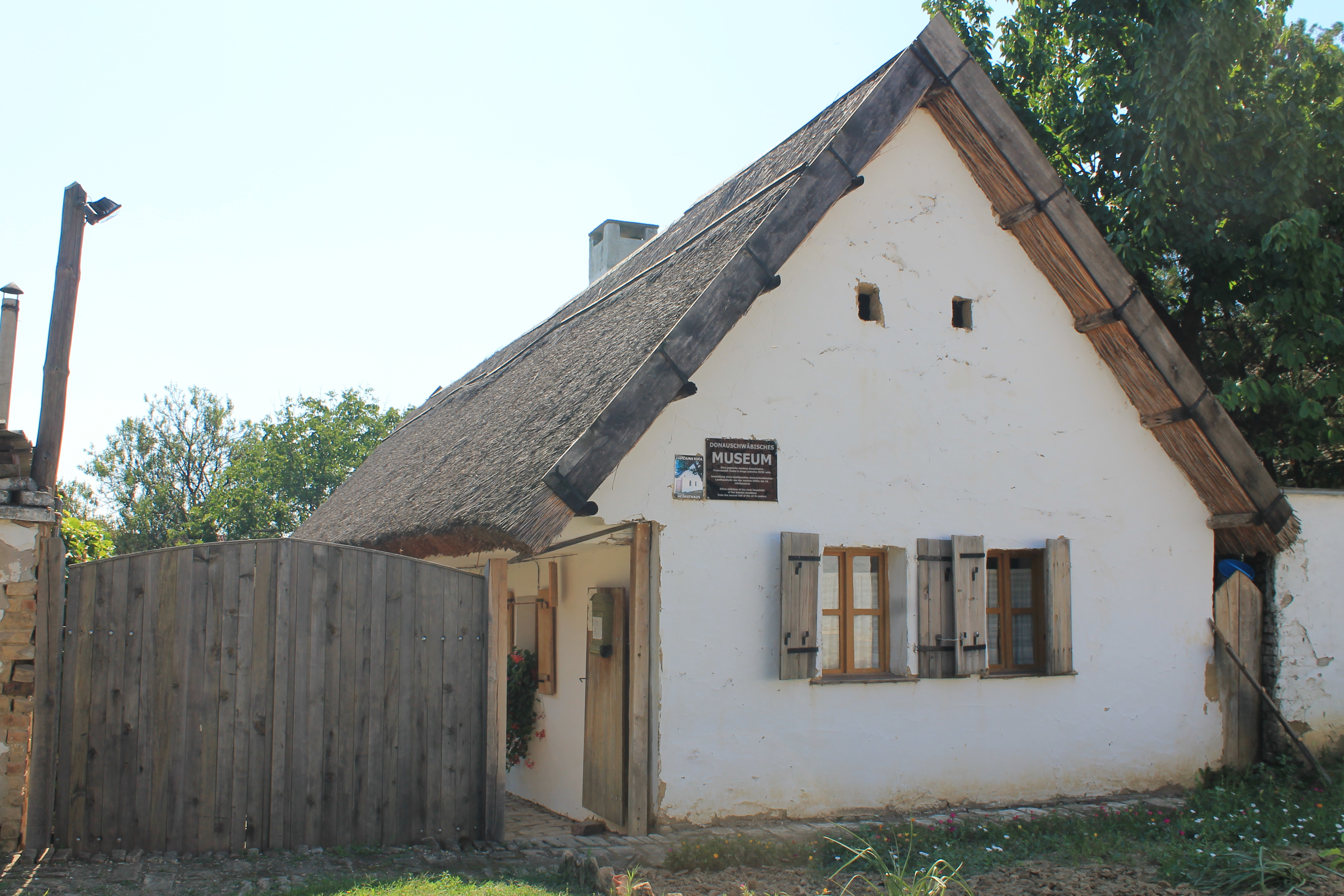
Museum of Danube Swabians in Sremski Karlovci, Serbia

In 1941, much of Yugoslavia was invaded and occupied by Nazi Germany as part of the Second World War, and in the German-occupied Banat, they granted the Swabian minority superior status over the other ethnic groups in the Yugoslav population. The Baranja and Bačka Swabians reverted to Hungary. The Danube Swabians were already under heavy Nazi influence by that time and served as the Axis fifth column during the invasion of Yugoslavia, although many served in the royal Yugoslav army in the brief war against the Nazis in April 1941. The Independent State of Croatia (1941–1945), a fascist puppet state created within Axis-occupied Yugoslavia, was home to 182,000 Danube Swabian ethnic Germans (who were called Folksdojčeri in Croatian). In addition, the Danube Swabian minority were granted the separate autonomous region of Banat within German-occupied Serbia In Backe in 1941, Danube Swabians formed around 20% of the population. Yugoslav Danube Swabians supplied more than 60,000 troops for German military formations, some voluntarily but many more under duress. They actively participated in the sometimes brutal repression of Yugoslav Partisans and their suspected sympathizers, including 69,000 Jews living in Yugoslavia.

The local collaborationist authorities were forced to make it illegal to draft Danube Swabians. However, of the approximately 500,000-strong Danube Swabian minority in occupied Yugoslavia (182,000 in the NDH, 350,000 in Vojvodina), 500,000 in Romania and 500,000 in Hungary, approximately 100,000 eventually entered service in various German and Axis military organizations, most notably in the two locally formed Waffen-SS volunteer divisions, the 7th SS Volunteer Mountain Division Prinz Eugen, and the 22nd SS Volunteer Cavalry Division (which was made-up of Hungarian Danube Swabians).

Although these military units were initially formed as volunteer units, SS officials ultimately imposed conscription under the dubious legal pretext that occupied Serbia was deutsches Hoheitsgebiet, and the archaic Tiroler Landsturmordung (Tyrol General Levy Act) of 1872 was invoked. Guenther Reinecke, chief of the Hauptamt SS-Gericht (SS legal office) wrote to Himmler that the Prinz Eugen was "no longer an organization of volunteers, that on the contrary, the ethnic Germans from Serbian Banat were drafted, to a large extent under threat of punishment by the local German leadership, and later by the SS Ergänzungsamt." At the end of the war, all POWs captured by the Yugoslav Army were killed as Yugoslav citizens collaborating with the enemy. In 2010, a mass grave of 2,000 summarily executed prisoners from the 7th SS Prinz Eugen was discovered near the Slovenian village of Brežice.

Between 1941 and 1943, a total of 2,150 ethnic German Bulgarian citizens were transferred to Germany as part of Adolf Hitler's Heim ins Reich policy. These included 164 Banat Swabians from Bardarski Geran and 33 from Gostilya. From 1945 to 1948, many ethnic Germans in Hungary were dispossessed and expelled to Allied-occupied Germany under the Potsdam agreement. In the Bačka, which had been part of Hungary from 1941, Schwowisch villages were emptied forcibly in March 1945.

In 1944, a joint advance of the Yugoslav Partisans, and the Soviet Red Army saw the liberation of northern areas of German-occupied Yugoslavia, which were home to the Danube Swabian minority. In Yugoslavia in particular, with many exceptions, the Danube Swabian minority "collaborated . . . with the occupation". Consequently, on 21 November 1944, the Presidium of the AVNOJ (the Yugoslav parliament) declared the ethnic German minority in Yugoslavia collectively hostile to the Yugoslav state. The AVNOJ Presidium issued a decree that ordered the government confiscation of all property of Nazi Germany and its citizens in Yugoslavia, persons of ethnic German nationality (regardless of citizenship), and collaborators. The decision acquired the force of law on 6 February 1945. The reasons for this announcement are still debated by historians, but revenge against the ethnic German minority and the expropriation of Swabian agricultural lands to facilitate collectivization in Yugoslavia appears to have been the prime reasons. In addition, approximately 30,000 Danube Swabians, the majority being women, were deported to Donbas in the Soviet Union as forced laborers in the coal mines of that region. It is estimated that 16% died due to the harsh conditions they faced.

In Yugoslavia in 1945, most ethnic Germans had their land confiscated and some were stripped of their citizenship by the new communist government. The old and the young were imprisoned in camps in several villages of Vojvodina (in modern Serbia) including Gakovo, Kruševlje, Rudolfsgnad (Knićanin), Molidorf (Molin), Bački Jarak, and Sremska Mitrovica, and two villages in the Slavonia region of Yugoslavia (now part of Croatia), Krndija, Valpovo. Those able to work were used as slave labor throughout the countryside. On 1 March 1946, there was a proposal to expel 130,388 interned Yugoslav ethnic Germans under the Potsdam Agreement. This proposal was turned down but provides a good estimate of the number of Schwowisch internees. In addition, 35,000–40,000 Swabian children under age sixteen were separated from their parents and forced into prison camps and re-education orphanages. Many were adopted by Serbian Partisan families.

Of a pre-war population of about 350,000 ethnic Germans in the Vojvodina, the 1958 census revealed 32,000 left. Officially, Yugoslavia denied the forcible starvation and killing of their Schwowisch populations, but reconstruction of the death camps reveals that of the 170,000 Danube Swabians interned from 1944 to 1948, about 50,000 died of mistreatment. Men between the ages of 16 and 65 were executed while women, children, and the elderly were interned, many succumbing to fatal diseases and malnutrition in Yugoslavia. Some of the Germans in Romania were deported, others were dispersed within Romania. Austrian historian Arnold Suppan considers the destruction of the Danube Swabians to be genocide.

=== Diaspora ===
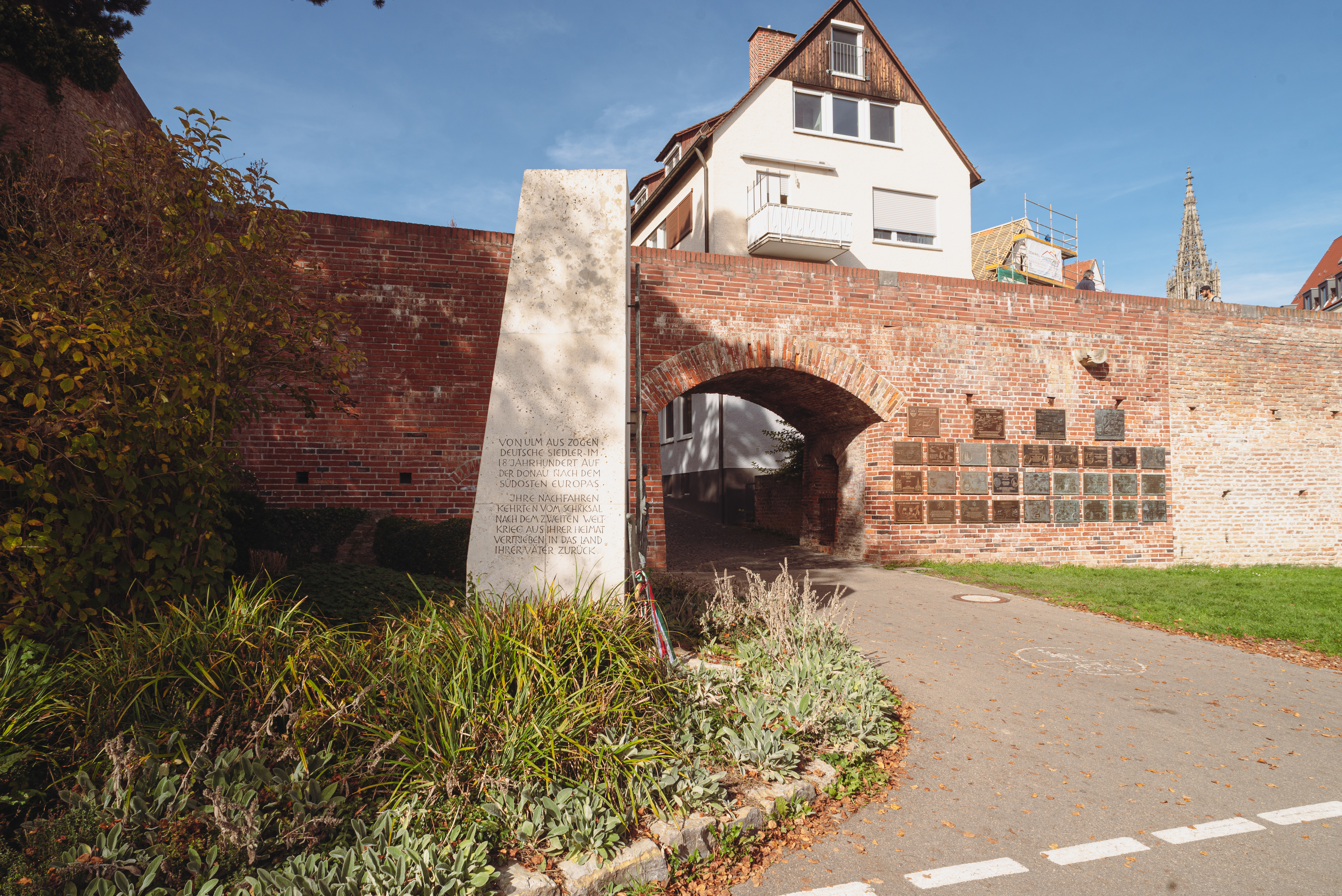
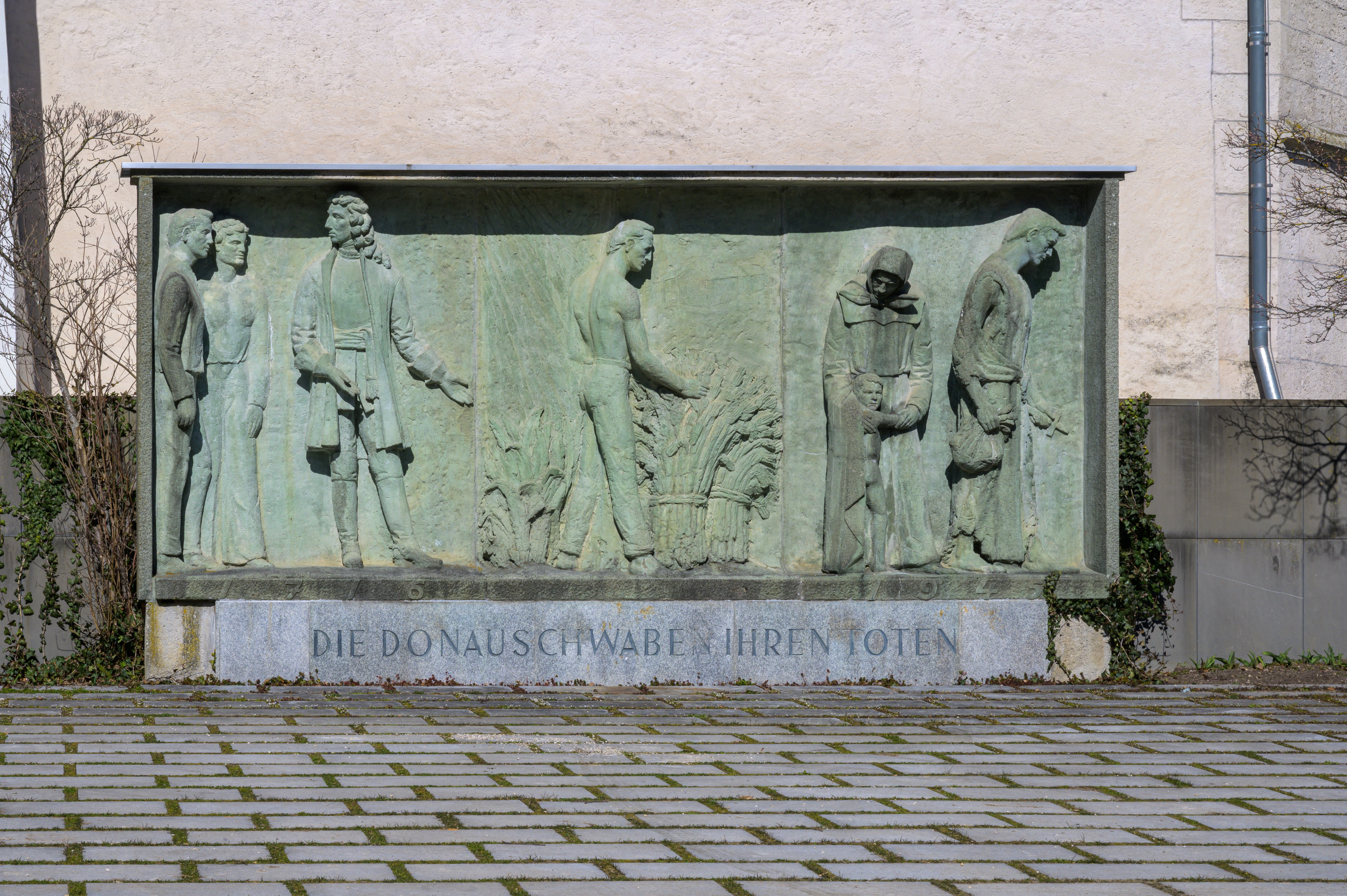
Danube Swabian memorials in Ulm, Germany (top) and Wels, Austria (bottom)

Beginning in 1920 and especially after World War II, many Danube Swabians migrated to the United States, Brazil, Canada, Mexico, Austria, Australia, and Argentina. Some of them, descending from French-speaking or linguistically mixed families from Lorraine, had maintained the French language for some generations, as well as an ethnic identity, later referred to as Banat French, Français du Banat. They were resettled in France around 1950. In the 1950s, many of the Lutheranian Danube Swabians went from West Germany and Austria to Canada and USA.

Many left Romania for West Germany between 1970 and 1990, and this trend increased in 1990. Many were literally sold to the Federal Republic of Germany, from the 70s until 1990. Since the fall of communism and the formation of new nations with new borders, the forces for movement of people among European nations have changed. Hungary joined the European Union and travel between nations became simpler. From 2001 to 2011, the number of those identifying as German in Hungary increased sharply, comparing the census tables from the two years. Explanations for the increase seem complex, including the willingness of citizens to claim the ethnic identity.

The greatest concentrations of Danube Swabians in the United States were in New York, Rochester, Trenton, Chicago, Cleveland, Cincinnati, Akron, Mansfield, Philadelphia, Detroit, Milwaukee, St. Louis, and Los Angeles. The diaspora communities of Danube Swabians maintain their language and customs in numerous societies and clubs. The number of organizations is shrinking as the generations that lived in the Danube Swabian homelands die.

== Culture ==
Danube Swabian men's (left) and women's tracht, from the house of the parents of Stefan Jäger in Jimbolia, Romania

Prior to the First World War, the Swabians were the largest ethnic group to assimilate into Hungarian society, seconded by the Galician Jews and the Slovaks. They were first and foremost Catholics, peasants thereafter, and thirdly loyal subjects to Kaiser Franz Joseph. But a distinct Hungarian Swabian ethno-national consciousness didn't develop until the spread of Romantic Nationalism in the late nineteenth century.

For the greater portion of their history, the Danube Swabian did not share a cultural identity. The term Swabian has its roots in the first wave a German-speaking immigrants from Swabia to re-settle southern Hungary after the expulsion of the Ottomans in 1689. However, it came to encompass all German-speaking people who followed in migrations from across the Holy Roman Empire in the eighteenth and nineteenth century. The term Swabian was not originally a self-proclaimed identity of a singular people but a term ascribed by Magyar lords to refer to German-speaking Catholic peasants, tavern keepers, and poor artisans. For the most part Swabians lived in villages, had few privileges, and no developed intellectual layer. In 1930 Hungary 55.4% of the total Swabian population were engaged in agriculture; 28.8% in industry, crafts, commerce, or transport; and 3.1% were in state administration. The rest were employed in the service sector.

The Danube Swabian culture is a melting pot of southern German regional customs, with a few degree of Hungarian-Croatian influence. This is especially true of the food, where paprika is heavily employed, which led to the German nickname for Danube Swabians as Paprikadeutsche. The architecture is neither Southern German nor Balkan but is unique to itself. The houses, often made of stamped mud and straw walls or mud bricks, are ubiquitous throughout the Vojvodina region. Georg Weifert was responsible for developing one of the most famous beers in the Serbia/Yugoslavia region and later became an important banker and politician in Belgrade (his image currently features on the Serbian 1000 dinar note).

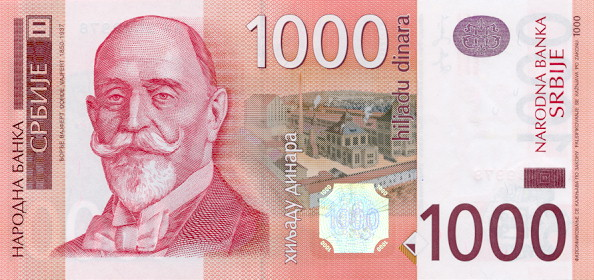
Georg Weifert on the 1000 Serbian dinar bill

=== Language ===
The Danube Swabian language is only nominally Swabian German (Schwowisch, as it was referred to locally). In reality, it contains elements or many dialects of the original German settlers, mainly Swabian, East Franconian, Austro-Bavarian, Pfälzisch, Alsatian, and Alemannic, as well as Austro-Hungarian administrative and military jargon. Loanwords from Hungarian, Serbian, or Romanian are especially common regionally regarding cuisine and agriculture, but also regarding dress, politics, place names, and sports. Other cultures of influence include Serbian and Croatian, Russian (for communist concepts), Romanian, Turkish (Hambar), English (for football), and general Balkan and South Slavic loanwords like Kukuruts (corn). The plural of loanwords is in most cases formed in the Schwowisch way. Conjunctions and adverbs from the respective contact languages may be integrated as well. In Baranya, the Stiffolderish Schwowisch is its own dialect.

Many German words used by speakers of Danube Swabian dialects may sound archaic. To the ear of a Standard German speaker, the Danube Swabian dialect sounds like what it is: a mix of southwestern German dialects from the 18th century with many strange words from other languages. Due to relative isolation and differing proximities to nearby German speakers (Austrians and Transylvanian Saxons), the language varies considerably, with speakers able to distinguish inhabitants of neighboring villages by the words they use for such things as marmalade (Leckwaar and Schleckle being two variants), or by how many (usually Hungarian) loanwords they employ. This even applied to verb conjugations. For example, the German verb "haben" was conjugated as "han" in Sankt Hubert and as "hava" In Mramorak, although both were in Banat.

Herman Ruediger, a German sociologist, reports that in his trips throughout the Bačka in the 1920s, Danube Swabians from widely separated villages had to use standard high German to communicate with each other because their speech was so different. This was particularly true for towns like Esseg (Osijek) where Schwowisch were thoroughly mixed with majority Croatians. For instance, the ethnic Germans of Esseg were so thoroughly assimilated with Croatia that their Schwowisch or 'Essekerish' could only be understood by those who also spoke Croatian or Serbian.

Sepp Stumper grew up in Ravni Topolovac and wrote numerous poems in dialect about the life of the Danube Swabians. In 2006, the poems were recorded in order to preserve the language for future generations.

=== Cuisine ===
Danube Swabian cuisine includes recipes brought with them from Germany but also includes regional dishes that were adopted into the Danube Swabian repertoire. Common foods include chicken paprikasch, goulash, spätzle, kipfel, caramel and walnut wafers called Oblaten, sarma, apple strudel, pumpkin strudel, cheese strudel, schaum rolle, djuvec, stuffed peppers and plum dumplings, distinctive Banater bratwurst, among others.

=== Naming conventions ===
As is the custom in Hungary (as well as southern Germany), Danube Swabians often put the surname first, especially when writing, for example Butscher Jakob (see photo of memorial). Danube Swabian villages tend to have relatively few family names as the villagers stem from only a few families, but usually the same family name does not appear in more than a couple of villages, meaning that there are many Danube Swabian family names. The names come from throughout southern Germany, from assimilated Hungarians, and occasionally from Balkan and Italian origins. There are usually no middle names, but often double first names, if a distinction can be made. The variety of first names is few, since children were usually named after grandparents or godparents. Popular names for women include: Anna, Barbara, Christina, Elisabeth, Eva, Katharina, Magdalena, Maria, Sophia, Theresia, and many two-name combinations thereof. Popular names for men include: Adam, Anton, Christian, Franz, Friedrich, Georg, Gottfried, Heinrich, Jakob, Johann, Konrad, Ludwig, Mathias, Martin, Michael, Nikolaus, Peter, Philipp (or Filipp), and Stefan (or Stephan). With so few names in villages, other modifiers or nicknames were almost always used to distinguish people. The modifiers were often size related (e.g., "Kleinjohann" or "Little Johann"), occupation related ("Tischler Stefan" or the "carpenter Stefan"), or location related (usually by prefixing the streetname).

=== Coat of arms ===
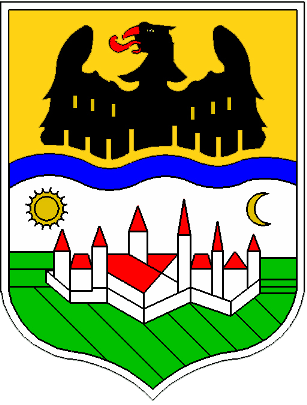
Coat of arms of the Banat Swabians created by Hans Diplich in 1950.

A coat of arms designed in 1950 by Hans Diplich has been adopted by many Danube Swabian cultural organizations. Its blazon is "Parti per fess wavy 1 Or, an eagle displayed couped Sable langued Gules; 2 parti per fess Argent and Vert, a fortress Argent roofed and turreted Gules surmounted with Sun and Crescent waning Or; chief wavy Azure".

It depicts:

- a black eagle representing the protection of the Emperor of Austria;
- a blue ribbon representing the Danube River;
- a crescent moon representing the waning of Islamic influence through the withdrawal of the Ottoman Turks;
- the Sun representing both Prince Eugene of Savoy and the light of Christianity; and
- a fortress representing the fortified city of Temeschburg (Timișoara).

== Resources for genealogical research ==
Germany

- Institut für Auslandsbeziehungen Stuttgart; (institute of foreign relations); church records (microfilm) of villages in the banat

Austria

- Theresianischer Kataster, Österreichisches Staatsarchiv, Finanz- und Hofkammerarchiv; Austrian archive

Luxembourg

- Institut Grand-Ducal, Section de Linguistique, d’Ethnologie et d’Onomastique, village chronics and family records
- Centre de Documentation sur les Migrations Humaines
- Nationalarchiv Luxemburg, Microfilms, notary records, church records

== See also ==
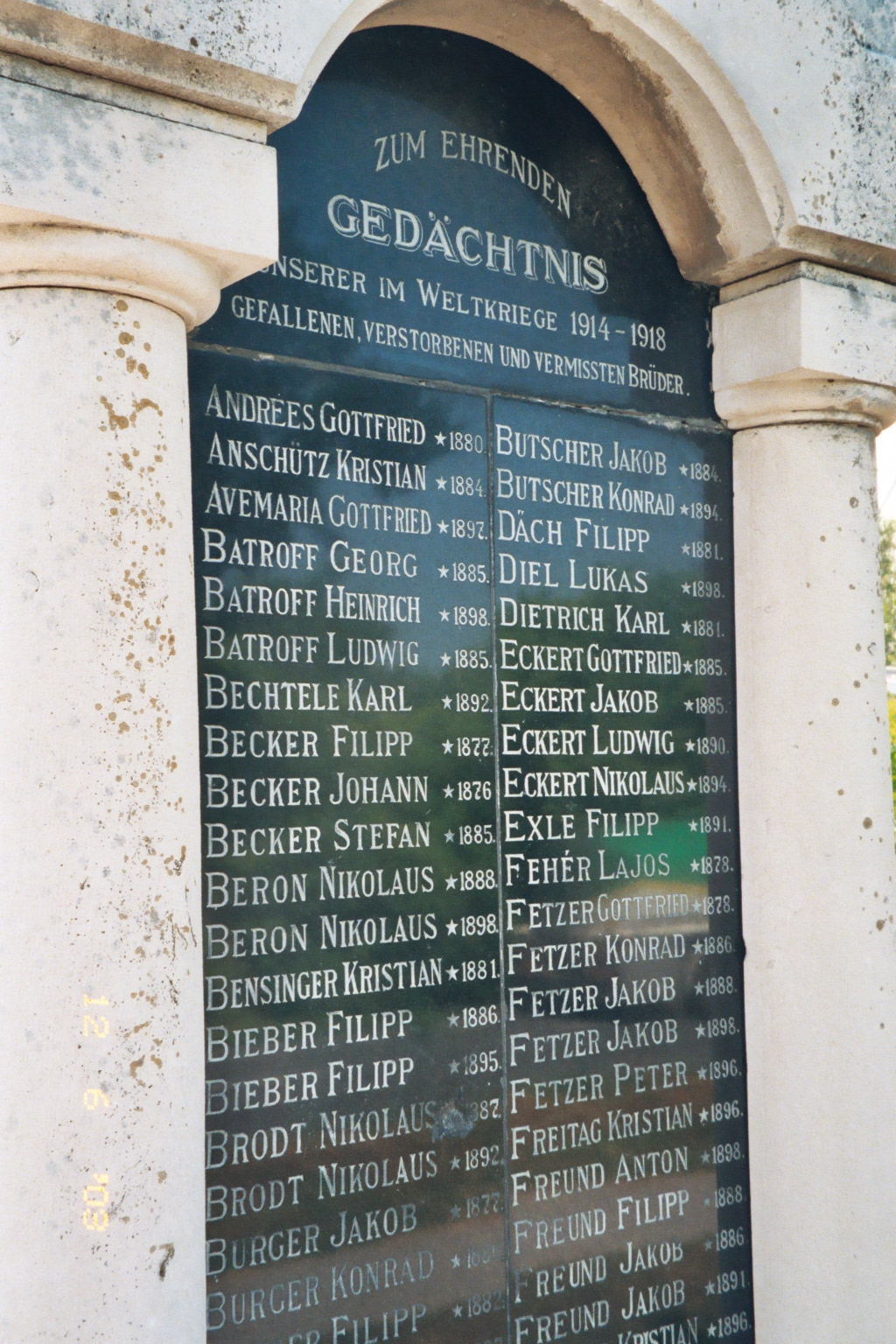
Memorial in German for soldiers who died in World War I in Lovćenac, Serbia

- Expulsion of Germans after World War II
- Germans of Hungary#Expulsion
- Wehrbauer
- Banat Swabians
- Ethnic German
- Volksdeutsche
- Carpathian Germans
- Baltic Germans
- Transylvanian Saxons
- Volga Germans
- Georg Weifert
- German World Alliance
