= Cenei =

- Commune
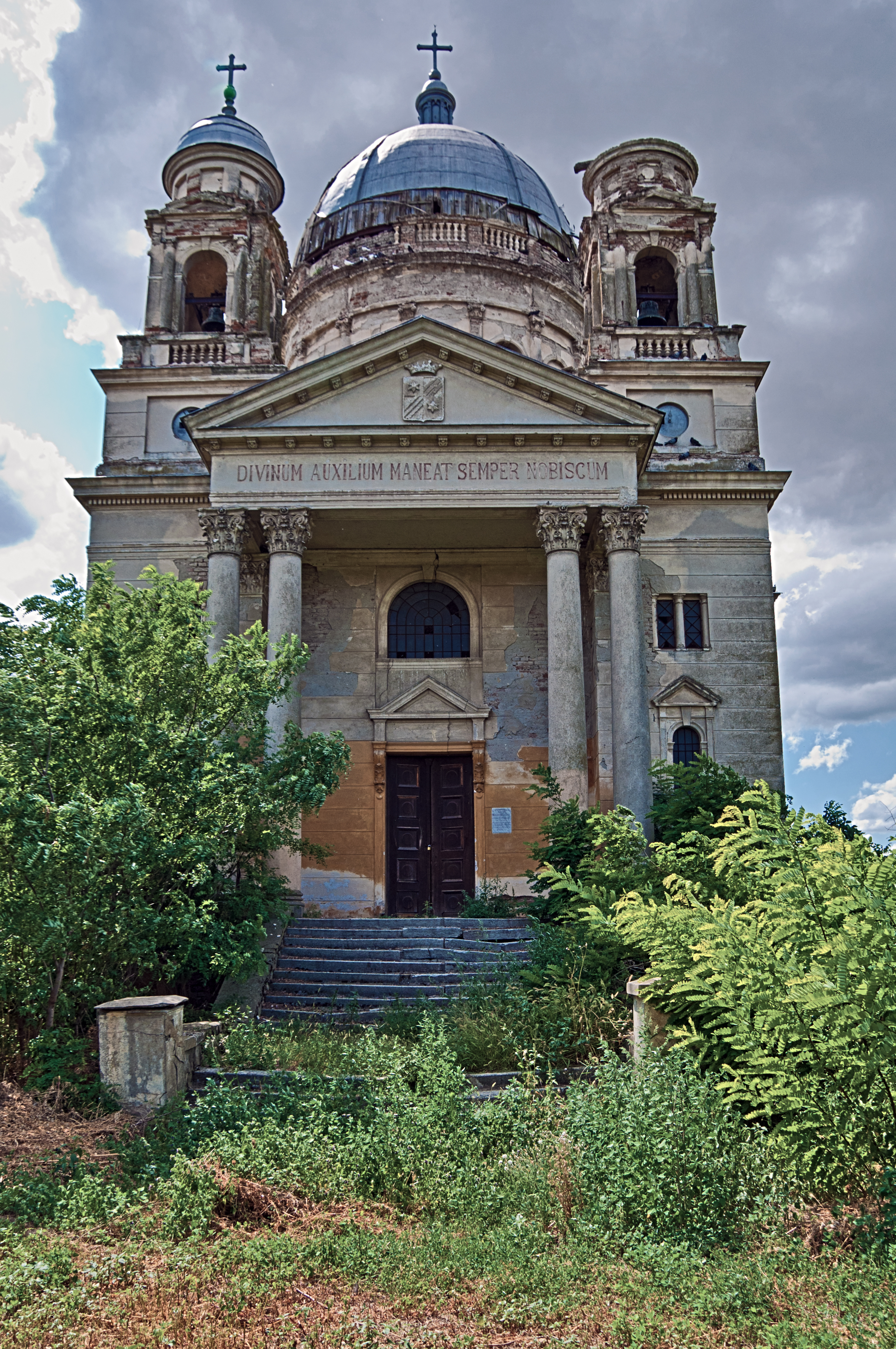
- The ruins of the church in Bobda, former mausoleum of the Csávossy counts and Roman Catholic church

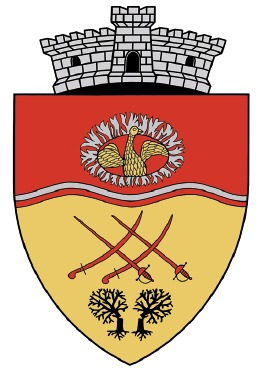
- Coat of arms

- Location in Timiș County

- Location in Romania
- Coordinates: 45°43′N 20°54′E
- Country: Romania
- County: Timiș

Government
  - Mayor (2020–): Sîrgean Tanasin (PSD)
- Area: 60.13 km^{2} (23.22 sq mi)
- Population (2021-12-01): 2,760
  - Density: 45.9/km^{2} (119/sq mi)
- Time zone: UTC+02:00 (EET)
  - Summer (DST): UTC+03:00 (EEST)
- Postal code: 307100–307101
- Vehicle reg.: TM
- Website: primariacenei.ro

Cenei (Hungarian: Csene; German: Tschene; Serbian: Ченеј, romanized: Čenej; Croatian: Čenej) is a commune in Timiș County, Romania. It is composed of two villages, Bobda and Cenei (commune seat). It also included Checea until 2004, when it was split off to form a separate commune.

== History ==
Cenei is one of the oldest settlements in Banat, first recorded in 1221 as a property of the archdiocese of Ittebe, today in Serbian Banat. By 1330 it belonged to the Sărad Fortress. Cenei was the site of a battle between the Turkish and Austrian troops on 20 August 1696.

As of 1720, the natives were mostly Romanians and Serbs. Through the efforts of the Vuketići family, Cenei was colonized with Croats between 1801 and 1820. German settlers arrived here only after 1848, much later than other nearby settlements. The Hungarian population did not settle here in waves of colonists, but gradually, over a long period of time. Today's village was formed by merging Ceneiu Sârbesc ("Serbian Cenei"; Serbian: Српски Ченеј, romanized: Srpski Čenej) and Ceneiu Croat ("Croatian Cenei"; Croatian: Hrvatski Čenej) in 1902.

== Demographics ==
Ethnic composition (2021)
1. Romanians (72.2%)
2. Serbs (12.5%)
3. Hungarians (6.12%)
4. Unknown (8.18%)
5. Others (0.99%)
Religious composition (2021)
1. Orthodox (67.1%)
2. Serbian Orthodox (12.6%)
3. Roman Catholics (8.18%)
4. Pentecostals (2.46%)
5. Unknown (8.55%)
6. Others (1.01%)
7. Irreligious, atheists and agnostics (0.10%)

Cenei had 2,760 inhabitants at the 2021 census, up 3.37% from the 2011 census. Most inhabitants are Romanians (72.21%), with larger minorities being represented by Serbs (12.5%) and Hungarians (6.12%). For 8.18% of the population, ethnicity is unknown. Most inhabitants are Orthodox by religion (67.13%), but there are also minorities of Serbian Orthodox (12.57%), Roman Catholics (8.18%) and Pentecostals (2.46%). For 8.55% of the population, religious affiliation is unknown.

Census		Ethnic composition
Year	Population	Romanians	Hungarians	Germans	Serbs	Croats
1880	3,892	841	255	1,437	1,242	–
1890	4,193	833	213	1,714	1,187	149
1900	4,233	832	317	1,575	1,223	114
1910	3,917	830	304	1,205	1,446	96
1920	950 (Note: Data on Cenei's population missing)	669	74	200	–	–
1930	3,800	958	236	1,216	1,196	–
1941	3,609	1,087	193	1,051	–	–
1956	3,554	–	–	–	–	–
1966	3,546	1,421	374	573	1,156	–
1977	3,487	1,570	384	468	987	43
1992	3,091	1,915	334	110	683	18
2002	2,868	1,920	299	65	531	17
2011	2,670	1,795	235	39	430	4
2021	2,760	1,993	169	21	345	3

== Politics and administration ==
The commune of Cenei is administered by a mayor and a local council composed of 13 councilors. The mayor, Sîrgean Tanasin, from the Social Democratic Party, has been in office since 2020. As from the 2024 local elections, the local council has the following composition by political parties:

Party	Seats	Composition
Social Democratic Party	8	
National Liberal Party	2	
Alliance for the Union of Romanians	2	
Union of Serbs of Romania	1	

== Notable people ==
- Stefan Jäger (1877–1962), painter
- Gheorghe Jurma (b. 1945), literary critic, writer, eminescologist and editor
- Ioan Ardeleanu (1947–2007), poet, prose writer, essayist and founder of Banat magazine
