= Stefan Jäger =

German painter

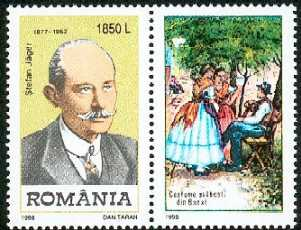
1998 postage stamp depicting Jäger

Danube Swabian women's tracht, from the historic house of the parents of Stefan Jäger, Hatzfeld (Jimbolia).

Stefan Jäger (May 28, 1877 in Tschene/Torontál – March 16, 1962 in Jimbolia/Hatzfeld, Romanian Banat) was a painter known for his depiction of and deep identification with the Danube Swabian community to which he belonged.

There are some grounds for categorising him as a Hungarian painter - since in the first half of his life he lived in what was part of Hungary, and some of his early career was spent in Budapest under the influence of Hungarian painters; a Romanian painter - since in the second half of his life his home region was part of Romania, and his contribution to Romanian culture was recognised by the government through awards in his lifetime and the maintenance of his home as museum up to the present; and a German painter - since, though he never lived in Germany, his identity as an ethnic German played a central part in his life and his artistic work.

== Biography ==
Stefan Jäger, son of the barber Franz Jäger and his wife Magdalena Jäger (née Schuller), was born at 1877 in Tschene/Torontál. At the age of 12 he attended the "Privatschule Franz Wieszners", a German-speaking school in Temeswar (today Timișoara), and at 16 the high school in Szeged, where his tendency to painting was recognized. At 18 he took up a four years' art study in Budapest.

After study trips in Austria, Germany and Italy, Jäger in 1910 established himself in Hatzfeld (today Jimbolia), where he spent the rest of his life. Though he had been active as a painter before the turn of the century, the first official exhibition of his paintings opened only in 1930.

As noted, the themes of many of his paintings were drawn from the history and daily life of his community, the Danube Swabians. Among the most well known of his works are

- The settlement of Germans in the Banat, approx. 1905, 300 cm broad
- The immigration of Germans to Hungary , 1906–1910, 145 x 510 cm

The 1930s and 1940s were a major crisis point for this community, as for the other East European ethnic Germans. During the Second World War, they were perceived as - and some of them were - collaborators with Nazi Germany's occupation. Specifically, many Danube Swabians were drafted to the Waffen-SS - officially as volunteers, though it was claimed that they had in fact little choice in the matter.

As a result, they were after 1945 the target of harsh reprisals and especially mass expulsions from countries such as Hungary and Yugoslavia where many of these families had lived for centuries. The ones in Romania, such as Jäger, were spared wholesale expulsion; nevertheless, they faced considerable harassment and many were dispersed within Romania, or left its territory at their own initiative (see also the Expulsion of Germans from Romania after World War II).

The later work of Jäger - already 62 years old when the war broke out - reflected these vicissitudes, for example the painting of Danube Swabians being led away by Soviet forces.

In 1957, under the Communist regime, he was on the occasion of his 80th birthday granted the Romanian Labour Medal Class II. He died in 1962.

His house at Jimbolia/Hatzfeld is now a museum, displaying not only his paintings but also traditional clothes and cultural artifacts of the Danube Swabian community.

== Bibliography ==
- Karl Hans Gross, Stefan Jäger - "Maler seiner heimatlichen Gefilde", Oswald Hartmann, ISBN 3-925921-11-7
- Karl Hans Gross, Stefan Jäger - "Skizzen, Studien und Entwürfe", Oswald Hartmann, ISBN 3-925921-57-5
