= Jimbolia =

- Town
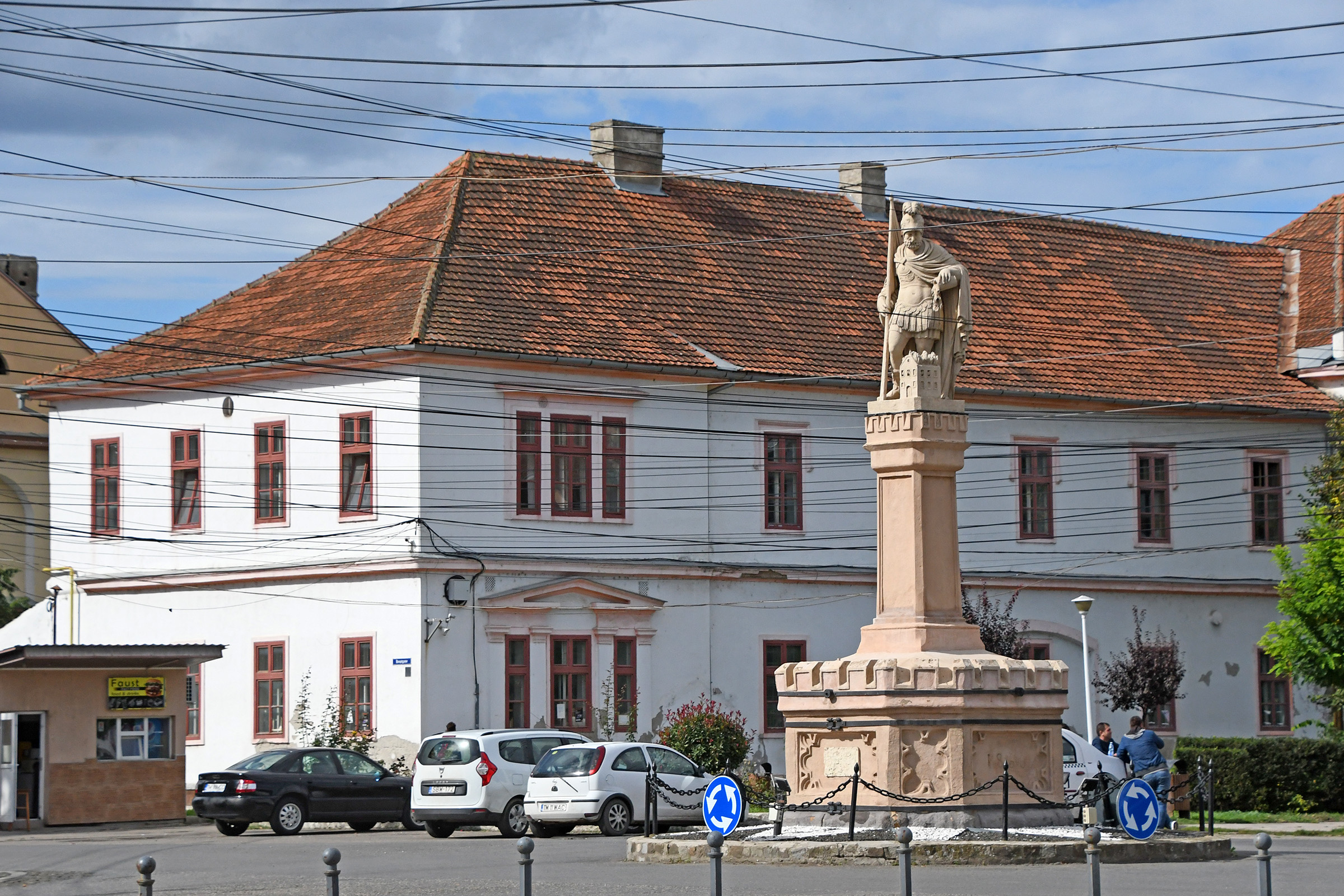
- Statue of Saint Florian

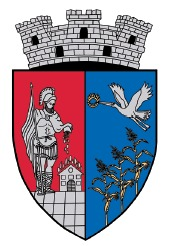
- Coat of arms

- Location in Timiș County

- Location in Romania
- Coordinates: 45°47′35″N 20°44′15″E
- Country: Romania
- County: Timiș

Government
  - Mayor (2024–2028): Darius-Adrian Postelnicu (PNL)
- Area: 108.18 km^{2} (41.77 sq mi)
- Elevation: 82 m (269 ft)
- Population (2021-12-01): 10,179
  - Density: 94.093/km^{2} (243.70/sq mi)
- Time zone: UTC+02:00 (EET)
  - Summer (DST): UTC+03:00 (EEST)
- Postal code: 305400
- Area code: +(40) x56
- Vehicle reg.: TM
- Website: jimbolia.ro

Jimbolia (Romanian pronunciation: [ʒimˈboli.a]; Hungarian: Zsombolya; German: Hatzfeld; Serbian: Жомбољ, Žombolj; Banat Bulgarian: Džimbolj) is a town in Timiș County, Romania.

== Geography ==
Jimbolia is located in the west of Timiș County, 39 km (24 mi) from the county seat, Timișoara, which is connected by the county road DJ59A and the Kikinda–Jimbolia–Timișoara railway. It lies in the Banat Plain, at the contact between the Timiș Plain and the Mureș Plain. An alignment of villages marks the boundary between the two relief units: Checea–Cărpiniș–Satchinez. The average altitude of the town is 82 m (269 ft). It is located at the intersection of some roads that connect Romania and Serbia, being also a rail and road border point at the frontier between the two countries.

Jimbolia's climate is characterized by average temperatures of 10.7 °C (51.3 °F) and average rainfall of 570 mm (22 in) per year. The vegetation consists of steppe meadows largely replaced by agricultural crops. The soils are very fertile and belong to the category of chernozems.

== History ==
=== Medieval period ===
The ancient history of the town began to be documented in 1332–1333, when a papal census of the lands of Banat for the establishment of taxes (tithe) took place. In these papal registers, the name Chumbul appears. From the researches of Hungarian historian Samu Borovszky, it appears that originally it was a Cumano-Vlach locality, a fact proved by the existence of a Romanian parish. This Chumbul is also mentioned in Hungarian documents from 1489, which speak of the existence of the communes of Chumbul Mare ("Great Chumbul"), Chumbul Mic ("Little Chumbul") and Chumbul Intern ("Inner Chumbul"), most likely owned by the Csomboly family. The last document from this period, recorded by historian Nicolae Ilieșiu, shows that in 1520 there was a certain Mihai of Chumbul, a close man of the king. After this appearance in documents from the beginning of the Middle Ages, nothing is said about this locality in documents from the Turkish rule of Banat.

=== Re-establishment and colonization ===
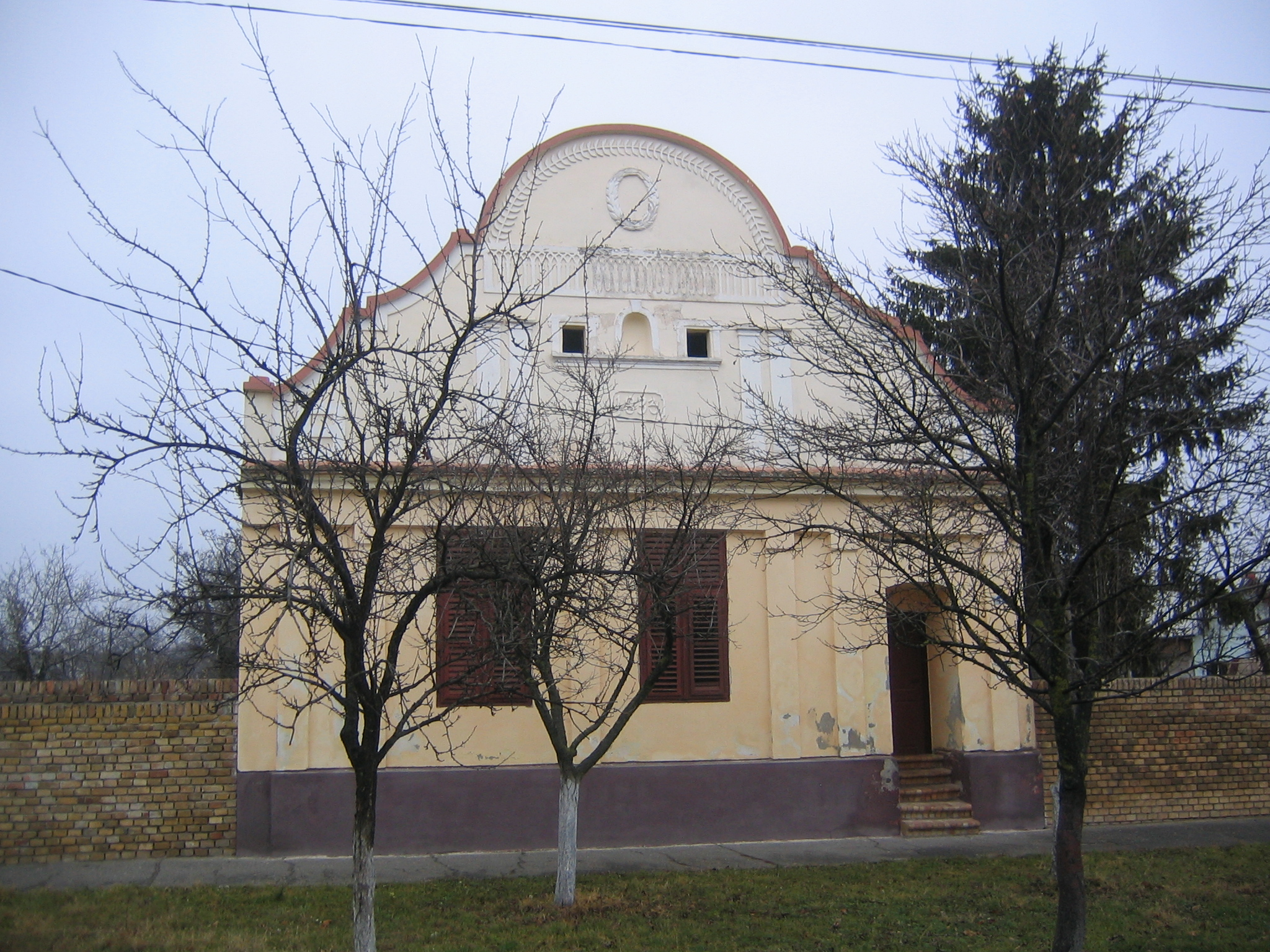
A Swabian house built in the 19th century

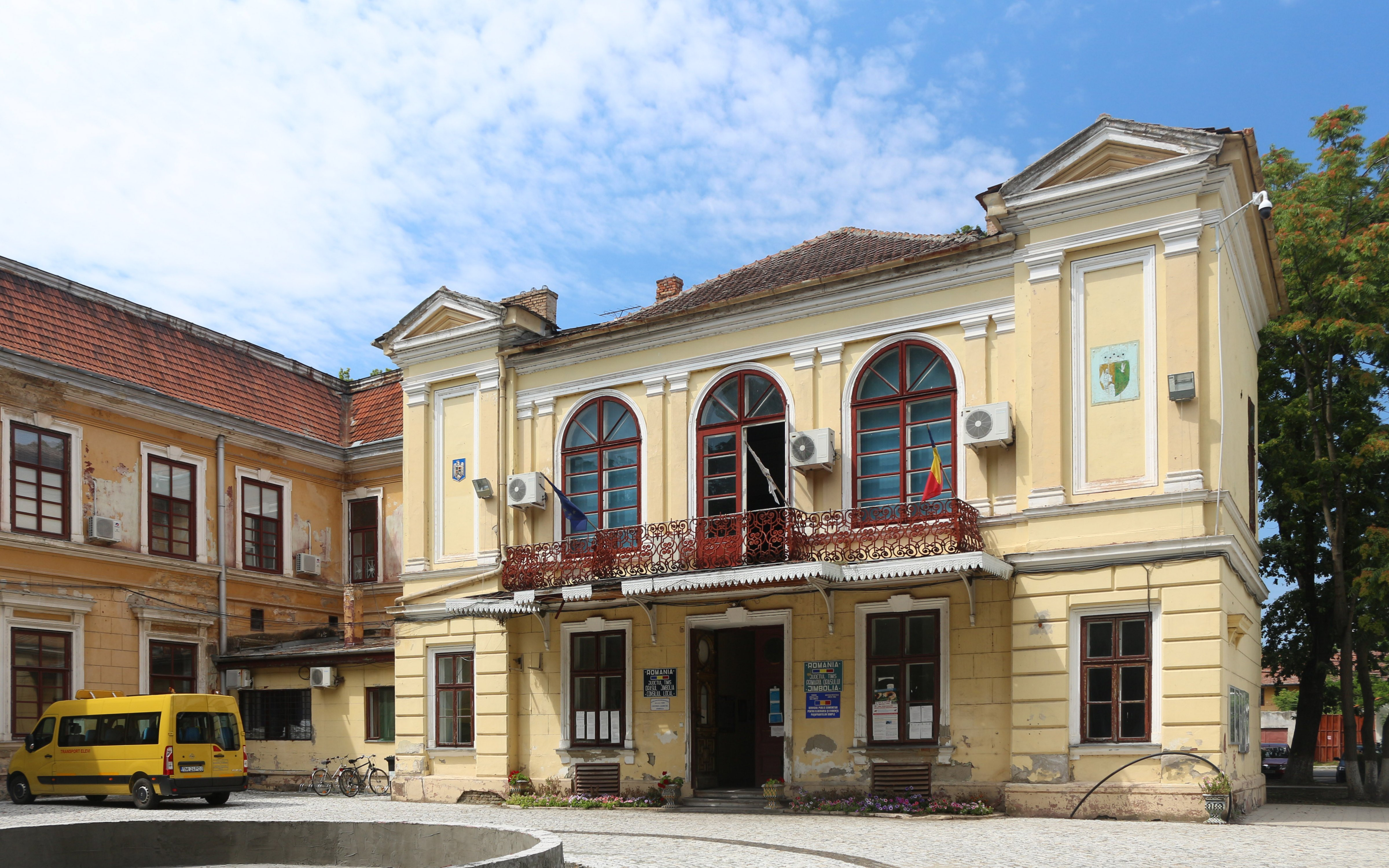
The Csekonics Mansion, built by the Csekonics family between 1863–1870, now serves as the seat of the Town Hall.

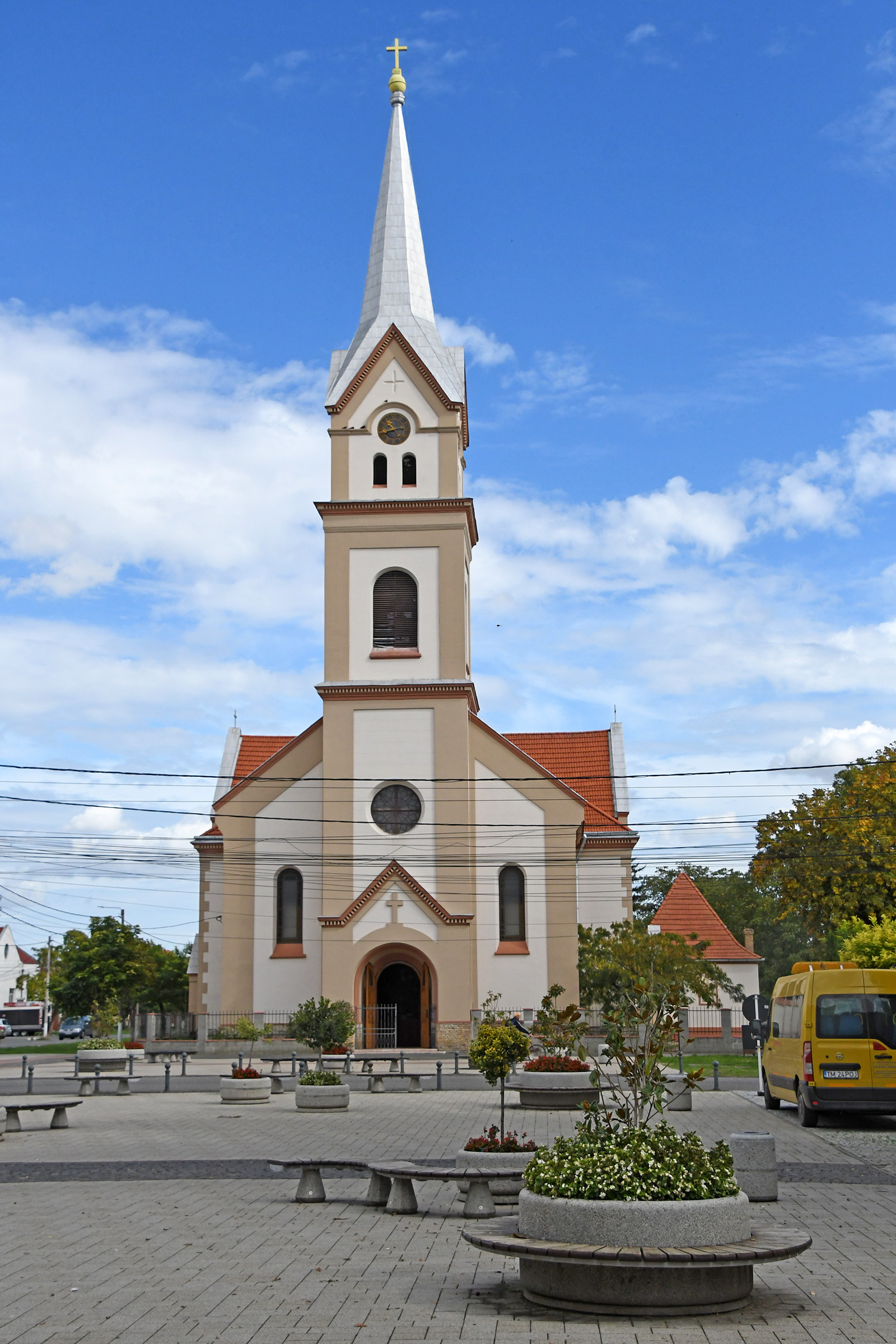
Saint Wendelin Roman Catholic church

The historical thread is resumed after the conquest of Banat by the Austrians, but for a period it does not appear to be inhabited. Only in 1766 was the new town born, by colonization with German population from Mainz, Trier, Sauer, Pfalz, Lorraine, and Luxembourg. It originally consisted of two separate areas, Landestreu and Hatzfeld, a little further west, but two years later the two merged under the name Hatzfeld, a name given in honor of Empress Maria Theresa's prime minister, Carl Friedrich Hatzfeldt zu Gleichen (1718–1793). The conditions to which the first settlers were subjected were particularly harsh: because of the swamps surrounding the settlement and the unsanitary conditions, 168 people died in the first year of establishment alone. A plague epidemic ensued in 1770 that killed no less than 553 people. In 1781 Hatzfeld was leased to József Csekonics, then sold to him. Later, the Csekonics family began to colonize the town with Hungarians.

=== Modern period ===
After the 1848–1849 revolution, the region became part of the Austrian Crown Land of the Serbian Voivodeship and Temeswarer Banat. Jimbolia began to develop in the second half of the 19th century, with the rise of industrialization that swept all of Banat. In 1857, the railway between Timișoara and Kikinda was completed, which also passed through Jimbolia and connected further with Szeged, being the main route from Timișoara to Budapest and Vienna. Access to this railway allowed it to develop rapidly, slowed only by the cholera epidemic of 1873, which killed more than 1,000 people. During this period, the brick factory (1864) opened, attracting agricultural workers from all over southern Banat, especially Hungarians. Thus was born the Futok district (of the "fugitives", from the name given to the Hungarians fleeing from the agricultural estates).

In 1861, Emperor Franz Joseph I decreed the renewed validity of the Hungarian state constitution (Austro-Hungarian Compromise), whereby the town once again belonged to the Hungarian part of the country, as it had before 1848. Under Hungarian administration, more and more Hungarians moved to the town, which was officially called Zsombolya from 1899.

In 1895 the Jimbolia–Ionel railway was put into use. In 1906, the railway from Jimbolia to Grabaț, Lenauheim and Lovrin was completed, built with the help of workers from Țara Moților, some of whom settled in the south of the town. At the turn of the century, Jimbolia was three-quarters German and one-quarter Hungarian, with only a few Romanians and Serbs.

=== Disputed by Romania and Serbia ===
World War I radically changed the configuration of the area within which Jimbolia played a central role. From an important town in the economy of Banat, it becomes a border town. After the withdrawal of the Serbs from Timișoara and the unification of Banat with Romania, Jimbolia remained in the provisional borders of Serbia. At the Paris Peace Conference, Prime Minister Ion I.C. Brătianu demanded the recognition of the borders of a Romania that included the whole of Banat, with the border on the lower Tisa until its discharge into the Danube and then the course of the Danube. However, the conference decided on the demarcation line that has been maintained until today, except for a rectification that took place in 1923. On 24 November 1923, Romania and Serbia concluded a protocol for a territorial exchange in Belgrade. Romania undertook to cede the communes of Pardanj, Modoš, Šurjan, Crivobara and Veliki Gaj, while Serbia ceded to Romania Beba Veche, Cherestur, Ciorda, Iam and the town of Jimbolia. The latter officially became part of Romania only in 1924.

=== Contemporary period ===
After World War II, Jimbolia entered a new stage of development in the planned economy. In 1950 it was declared a town, then the block of flats in the station area began to be built, new industries were introduced and existing ones were developed. At the same time, the irreversible process of declining German population begins, which within a few decades becomes a minority and ends with the mass exodus after the 1989 revolution.

== Demographics ==
Ethnic composition (2021)
1. Romanians (71.5%)
2. Roma (6.10%)
3. Hungarians (6.08%)
4. Germans (1.48%)
5. Unknown (14.3%)
6. Others (0.48%)
Religious composition (2021)
1. Orthodox (61.2%)
2. Roman Catholics (16.9%)
3. Pentecostals (4.01%)
4. Unknown (14.9%)
5. Others (2.55%)
6. Irreligious, atheists and agnostics (0.43%)

Jimbolia had a population of 10,179 inhabitants at the 2021 census, down 5.82% from the 2011 census. Most inhabitants are Romanians (71.53%), larger minorities being represented by Roma (6.1%), Hungarians (6.08%) and Germans (1.48%). For 14.33% of the population, ethnicity is unknown. By religion, most inhabitants are Orthodox (61.2%), but there are also minorities of Roman Catholics (16.94%) and Pentecostals (4.01%). For 14.87% of the population, religious affiliation is unknown.

Census		Ethnic composition
Year	Population	Romanians	Hungarians	Germans	Roma	Serbs
1880	8,621	39	529	7,848	–	84
1890	9,580	42	718	8,602	132	84
1900	10,152	52	1,532	8,395	–	96
1910	10,893	105	2,266	8,088	–	245
1930	10,873	660	2,097	7,640	213	141
1941	10,781	859	2,066	7,245	–	–
1956	11,281	3,490	2,399	4,834	298	111
1966	13,633	5,314	2,816	4,927	342	108
1977	14,682	6,065	2,896	5,021	511	79
1992	11,830	7,901	1,961	1,112	695	62
2002	11,136	8,068	1,643	515	771	53
2011	10,808	7,856	1,169	310	596	31
2021	10,179	7,282	619	151	621	21

== Politics and administration ==
The town of Jimbolia is administered by a mayor and a local council composed of 17 councilors. The mayor, Darius-Adrian Postelnicu, from the National Liberal Party, has been in office since 2012. As from the 2024 local elections, the local council has the following composition by political parties:

Party	Seats	Composition
National Liberal Party	6	
Alliance for the Union of Romanians	3	
Social Democratic Party	2	
Democratic Alliance of Hungarians in Romania	2	
Ind.	1	
Green Party	1	
Democratic Forum of Germans in Romania	1	
Save Romania Union	1	

== Culture ==
In recent years, the town is experiencing a cultural revival, benefiting from very active cultural institutions: the House of Culture, six museums, a literary café and a town library.

The most prestigious of them is the Romanian-German Cultural Foundation founded by Romanian poet Petre Stoica, with numerous national and international awards. With the main purpose of reconstituting the Romanian and German cultural and spiritual life in Banat, the foundation has in its inventory a library of 16,000 volumes in Romanian and German, some with great bibliophilic value, a collection of numismatics, philately, stamps and bookplates, important manuscripts from Romanian and German writers, paintings, engravings, and museum household objects.

=== Museums ===
- Sever Bocu Press Museum, housing tens of thousands of newspapers and magazines spanning from the early 19th century to the present day
- Stefan Jäger Museum, showcasing the works of Banat Swabian painter Stefan Jäger
- Railway Museum
- St. Florian Firefighters Museum
- Dr. Karl Diel Memorial House
- Petre Stoica Memorial House
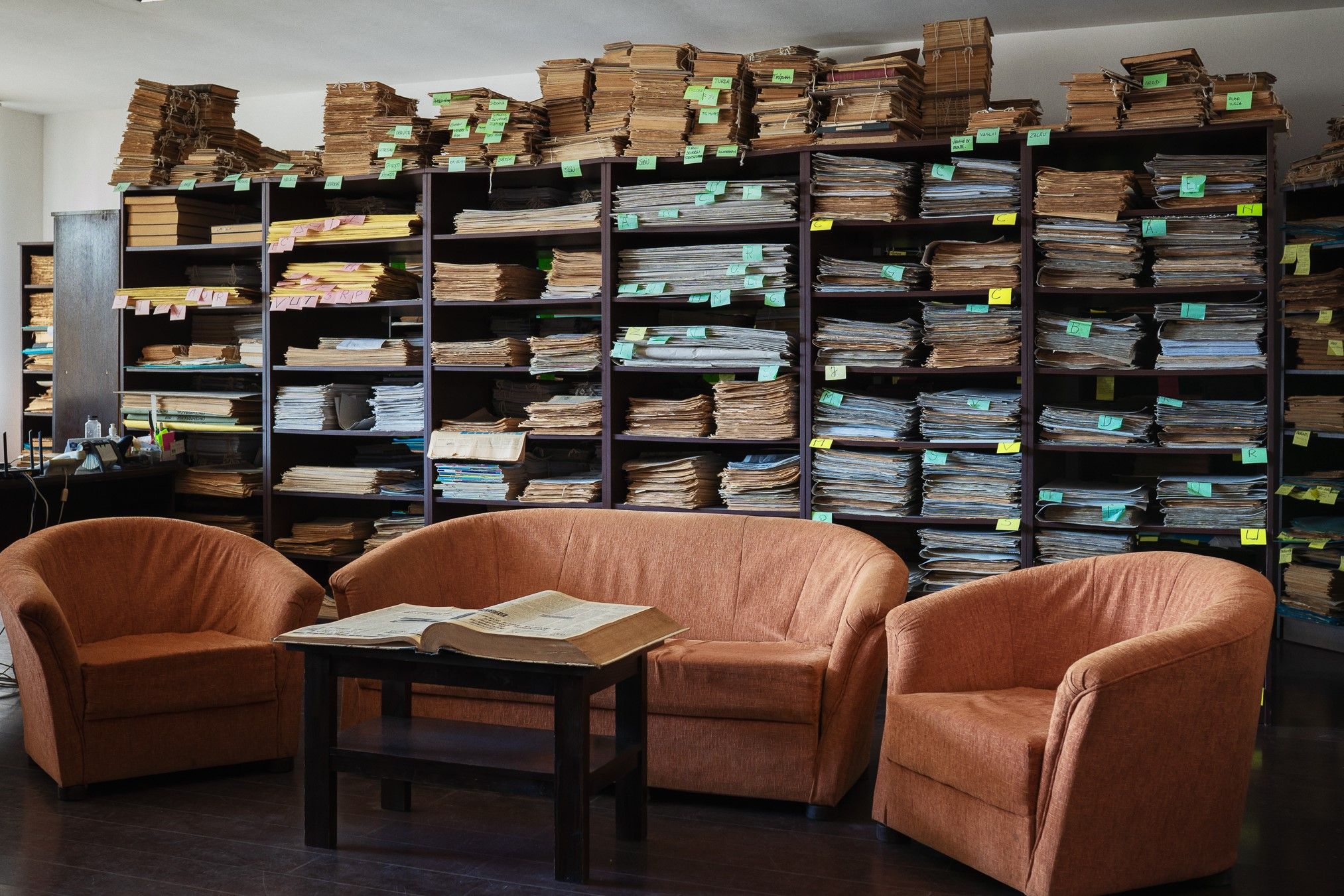
Sever Bocu Press Museum

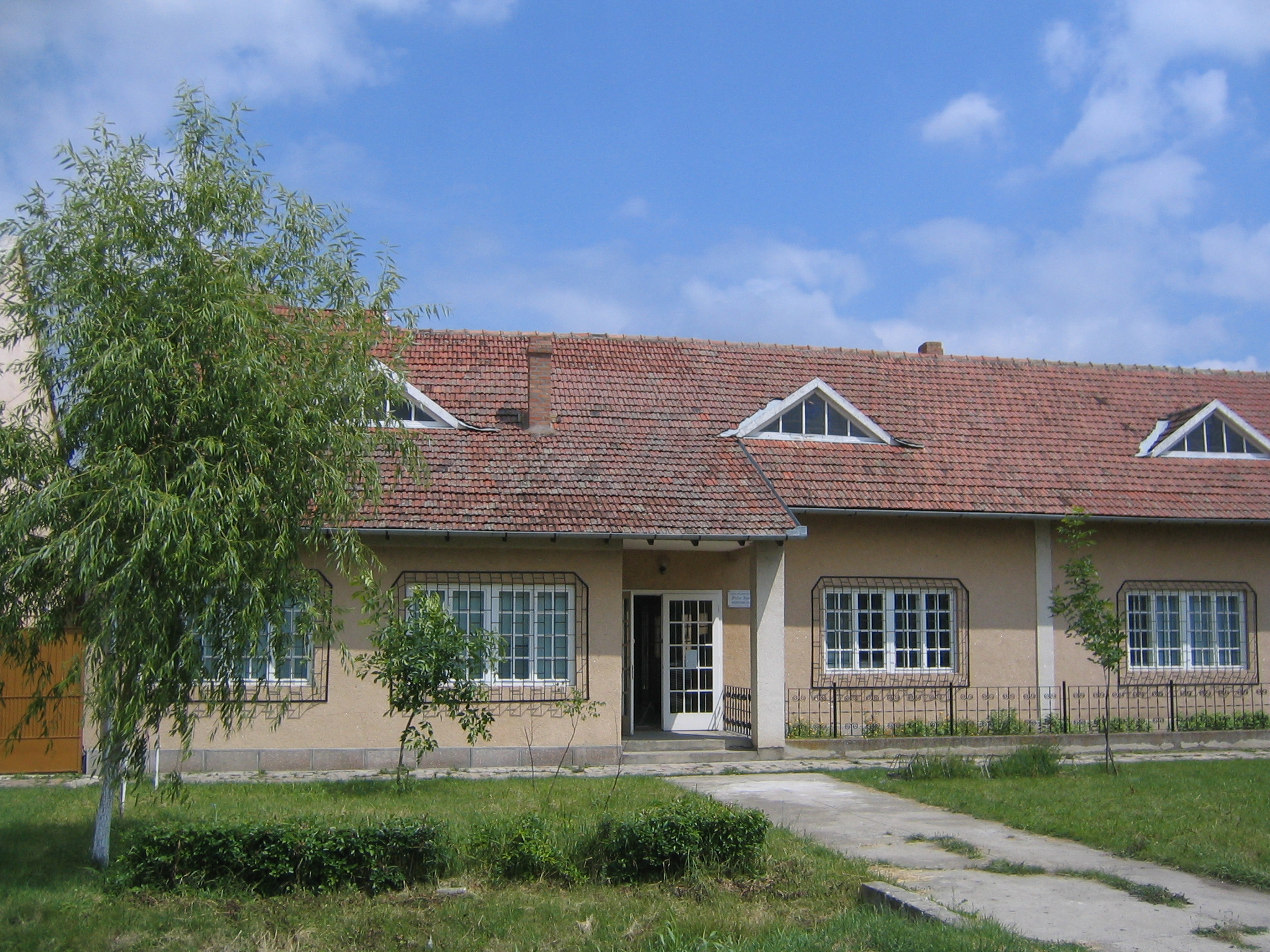
Stefan Jäger Museum

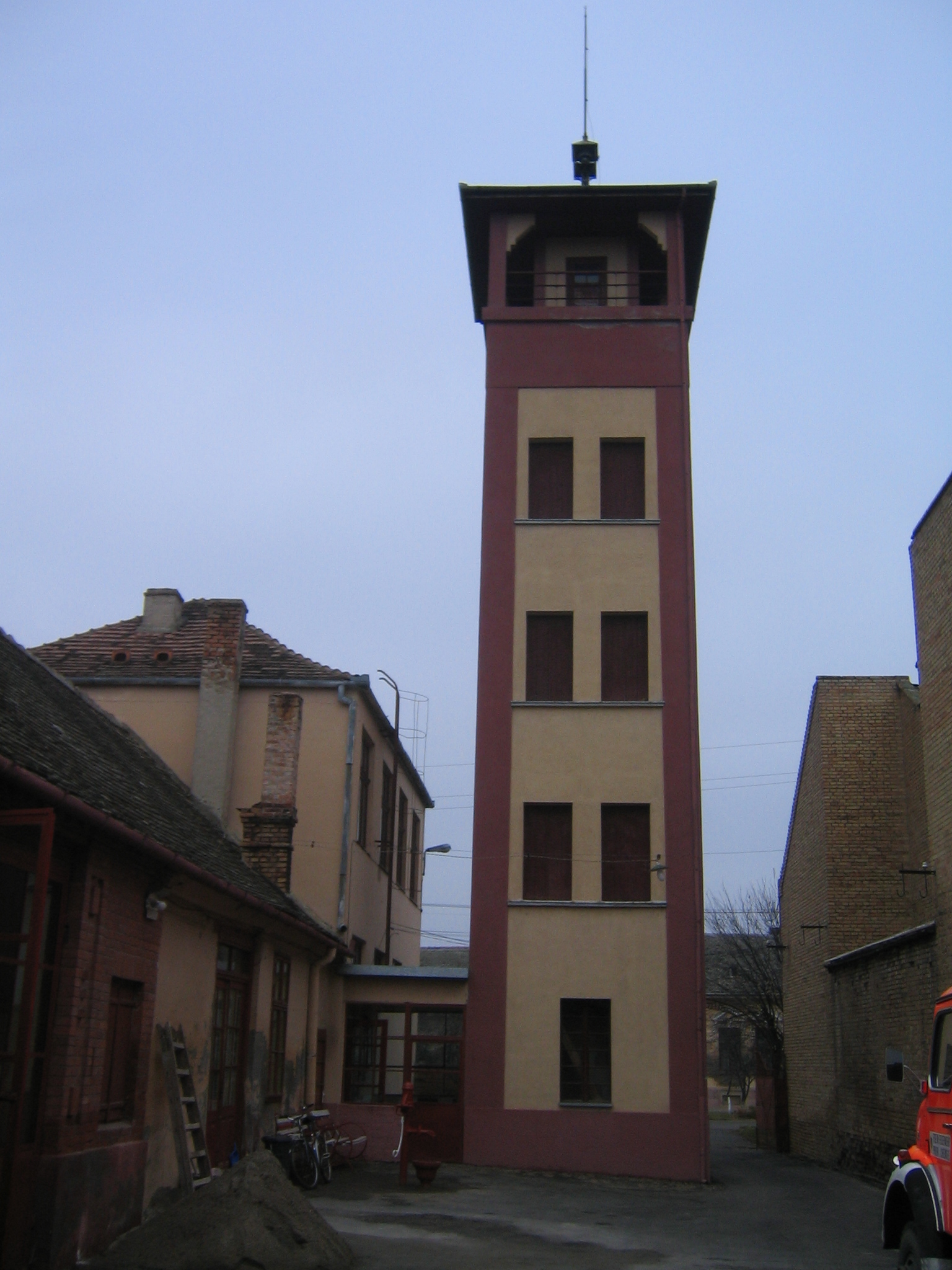
Firefighters' Tower

== Education ==
In the town there are five kindergartens for preschool children, a general school (1–8) where over 1,000 students study and a school group for 1,200 students.

The Technological High School in Jimbolia has theoretical and technological classes, vocational school, night courses and post-secondary courses. Following an investment from the Landtag of North Rhine-Westphalia, the high school offers high schooling conditions, with modern laboratories of computer science, mechanics, electrical engineering, electronics, farm equipment repair and maintenance, welding and hydraulic-pneumatics.

== Healthcare ==
Medical services are provided by five private medical offices, four private dental offices and a town hospital with a capacity of 125 beds.

== Economy ==
From an economic point of view, the primary sector, agriculture, has a significant share. The land fund comprises 9,735 ha (24,060 acres) of agricultural land, of which 97% is arable land and 3% are grasslands and hayfields.

The industrial profile of the town remains dominated by the light industry (footwear, clothing, textiles), followed by electrical and electronic engineering industries, mechanical industry and plastics industry. 58% of the active population works in the town's industry. The largest industrial companies in the town are: Vogt (electronic components), Ciocanul Prodimpex (footwear), CRH (car subassemblies), Halm (hydraulic pumps), Ani Fashion (clothing), Faulhaber (micromotors) and Kabelsysteme Hatzfeld (audio-video cables).

The tertiary sector, which covers the full range of services, has a share of 38%.

== Twin towns ==
Jimbolia has concluded twinning or collaboration agreements with:

- (Serbia) Kikinda (1992)
- (Hungary) Pusztamérges (1996)
- (Serbia) Novi Kneževac (collab., 2005)
- (Germany) Hatzfeld (collab., 2008)
- (Slovakia) Dunajská Streda (2012)
- (Hungary) Csanádpalota (2015)
- (Hungary) Mórahalom (2016)
- (Germany) Trebur (2017)

== Notable people ==
- Karl Kraushaar (1858–1938), pedagogue, journalist, non-fiction author and banker
- Peter Jung (1887–1966), poet and publicist
- Peter Heinrich (1890–1944), politician
- Alexander Krischan (1921–2009), historian and bibliographer
- Herbert-Werner Mühlroth (b. 1963), journalist and translator
