= Banat Highland Germans =

German ethnic group

German: Banater Berglanddeutsche

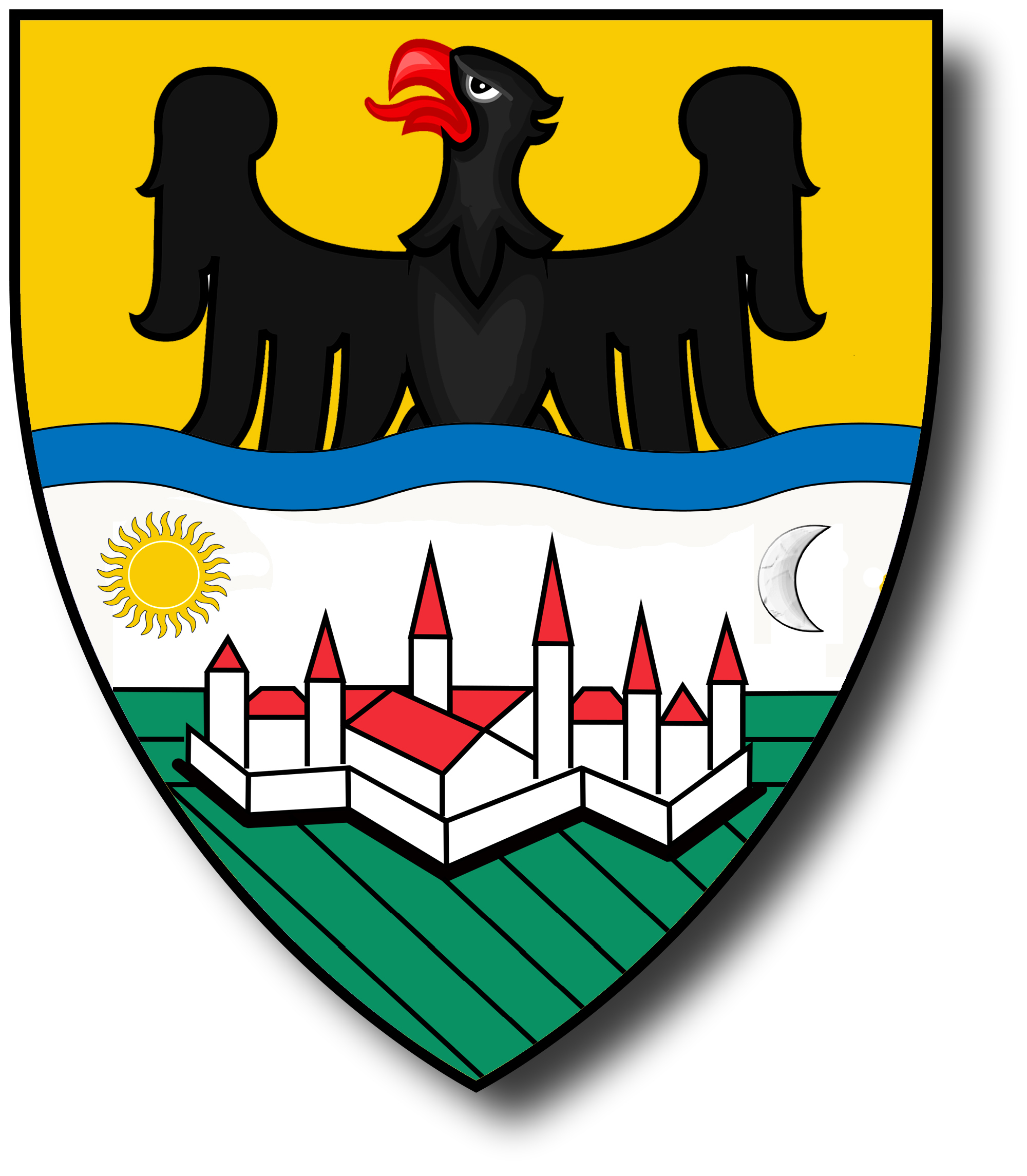
- The coat of arms of the Banat Highland Germans (as part of the Banat Swabians and Danube Swabians in general)

Regions with significant populations
- Banat (south-western Romania), more specifically Caraș-Severin County

Languages
- German (with the Banat Swabian dialect, a local type of the Swabian dialect)

Religion
- Primarily Roman Catholicism

Related ethnic groups
- Germans (most notably Swabians and Danube Swabians respectively)
- Native to south-western present-day Romania

The Banat Highland Germans or Banat Mountainous Germans (German: Banater Berglanddeutsche, Romanian: Germanii din Banatul montan) are an ethnic German sub-group which is part of the Banat Swabians (and the broader Danube Swabian group) who have been living in the mountainous part of the Banat (German: Banater Bergland or Montanbanat), corresponding to Caraș-Severin County situated in present-day south-western Romania (and to a smaller extent Serbia as well).

Within the larger community of Banat Highland Germans, there have also been Zipser Germans (German: Zipser Sachsen), an ethnic German minority group which mostly settled in Maramureș and southern Bucovina from Zips, present-day Slovakia. The Banat Highland Germans are part of the Romanian Germans.

== Background ==
The Banat Highland Germans are a mixture of various German-speaking settlers from Salzkammergut (now in Austria), the South Tyrol (now in Italy), the Bohemian Forest (now in the Czech Republic), the Bavarian Forest, and Swabia (now in Germany). There were also Zipser colonists in the mountainous Banat. Consequently, they speak a certain series of different German dialects than the Banat Swabians in the lowlands of Banat, hence the differentiation in their name based on altitude or elevation.

== History ==
The Banat Highland Germans constituted themselves as an ethnic German sub-group in the present-day mountainous region of Banat during the modern period, in the time of Austria-Hungary.

== Political representation ==
Like all other German minority groups in Romania, the Banat Highland Germans are represented by the Democratic Forum of Germans in Romania (FDGR/DFDR), more specifically by the local branch in the mountainous Banat known in German as Demokratisches Forum der Banater Berglanddeutsche.

== See also ==
- Germans of Romania
- Germans of Serbia
