= German immigration =

German immigration may refer to:

- Immigration to Germany
  - Expulsion of Germans after World War II
- Emigration from Germany (disambiguation)
  - German American
  - German Australian
  - German-Brazilian
