= Satu Mare Swabians =

German ethnic group

Sathmar Swabians
German: Sathmarer Schwaben
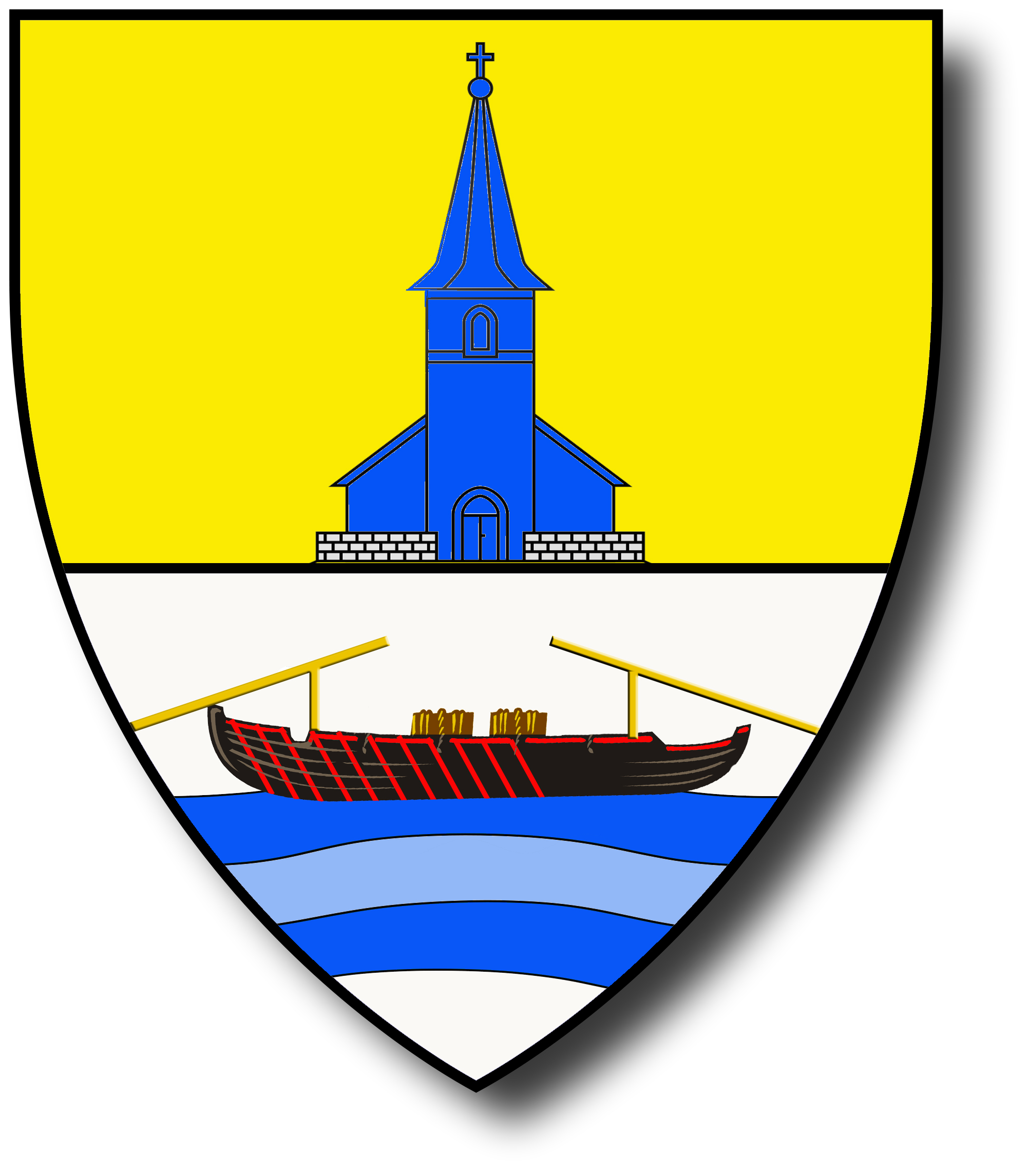
- The coat of arms of the Sathmar Swabians

Regions with significant populations
- Counties: Satu Mare County; Sălaj County; Maramureș County; (i.e. north-western and northern Transylvania)

Languages
- German (with the Sathmar Swabian dialect)

Religion
- Primarily Roman Catholicism

Related ethnic groups
- Germans (most notably Swabians and Danube Swabians respectively)
- Native to north-western and northern Transylvania

The Satu Mare Swabians or Sathmar Swabians (German: Sathmarer Schwaben) are a German ethnic group in the Satu Mare (German: Sathmar) region of Romania. Romanian Germans, they are one of the various Danube Swabian (German: Donau Schwaben) subgroups that are actually Swabian in heritage, and their dialect, Sathmar Swabian, is similar to the other varieties of the Swabian German dialect.

Most were originally farmers in Upper Swabia who migrated to Partium (at the time Hungary, now Romania) in the 18th century, as part of a widespread eastward movement of German workers and settlers. Their principal settlements were Satu Mare, Carei, Petrești, and Foieni (German: Fienen) and they also settled in Urziceni (German: Schinal), Căpleni (German: Kaplau), Tiream (German: Terem), Beltiug (German: Bildegg), Ciumești (German: Schamagosch), and Ardud (German: Erdeed).

After World War II, many evacuated, migrated, or were expelled to what became West Germany. Those who remain in Romania, along with other German-speaking groups in this country, are politically represented by the FDGR/DFDR (Democratic Forum of Germans in Romania); in Germany, the Landsmannschaft der Sathmarer Schwaben in Deutschland (Territorial Association of Sathmar Swabians in Germany) represents and assists them. Many Danube Swabians retain their cultural & ethnic heritage such as Klaus Iohannis the former Romanian President who served 2 terms & many other families who never took part in the forced Magyarization. A form of ethnic identity cleansing to that the vast majority of Germans rejected.

== History ==
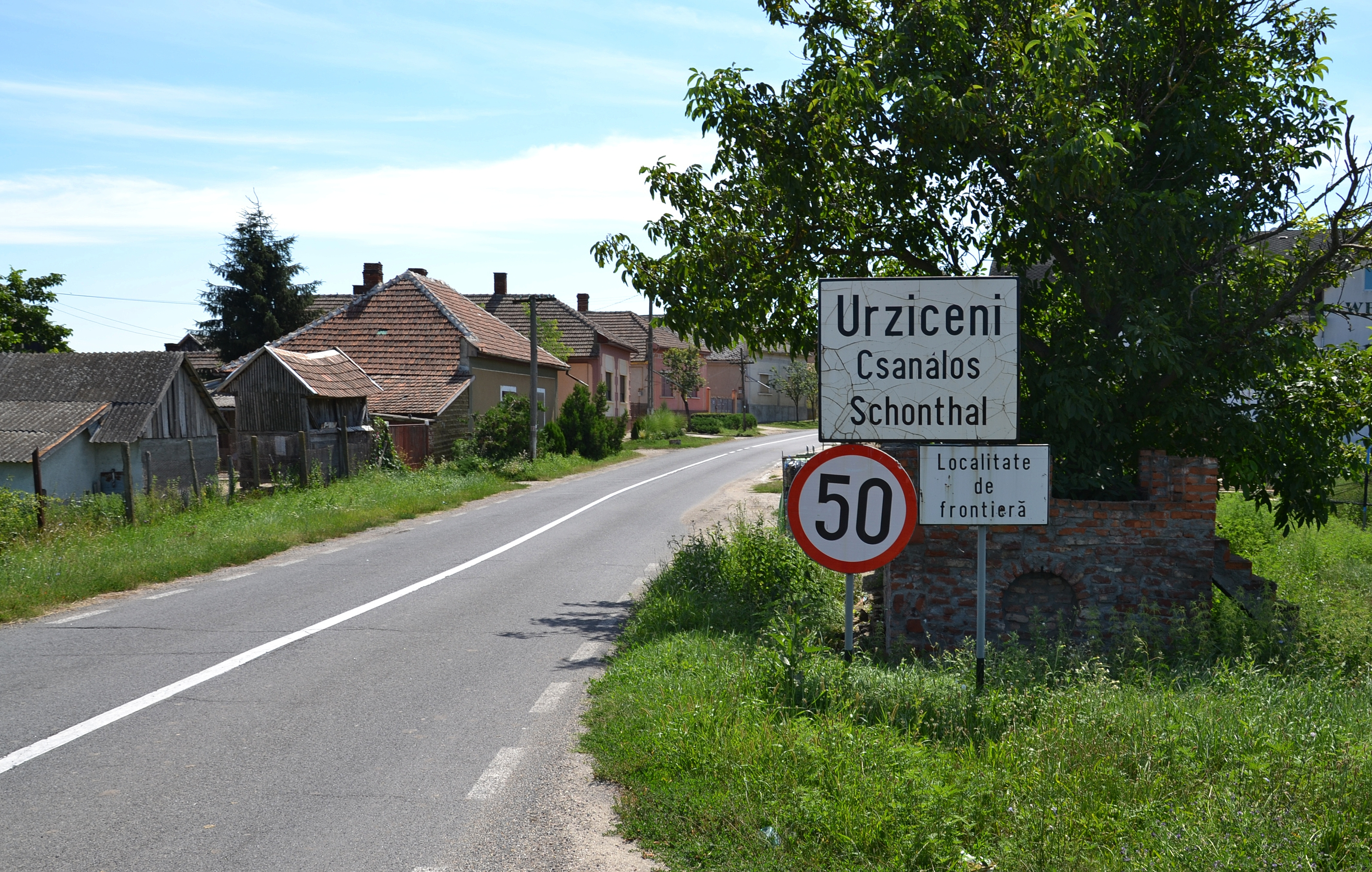
The commune of Urziceni (German: Schonthal) in Satu Mare County

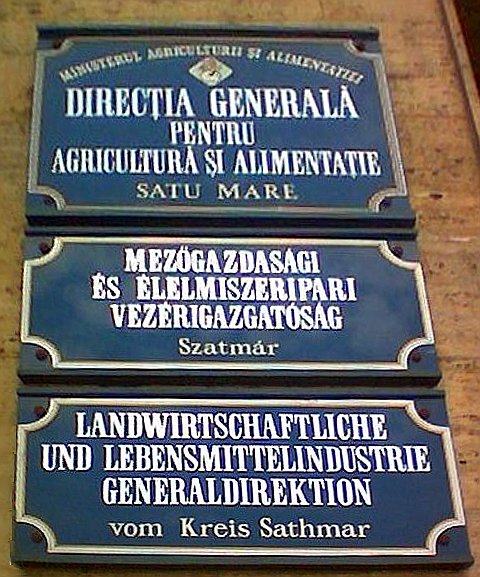
Trilingual Romanian-Hungarian-German sign in Satu Mare (German: Sathmar)

The Sathmar Swabians' ancestors stem from Upper Swabia (German: Oberschwaben) (situated in southern Württemberg area), present-day Germany when the first waves of agricultural colonists arrived in north-western and northern Transylvania during the 18th century, during the end of the Modern Age.

Between 1712 and 1815, Count Alexander Károlyi and his descendants recruited colonists from the Kingdom of Württemberg. Many emigrants came from the present-day districts of Ravensburg and Biberach.
