= Ovidiu Ganț =

Romanian politician

Ovidiu Victor Ganț (born 18 August 1966) is a Romanian politician and former Member of the European Parliament. A member of the Chamber of Deputies since 2004, he was the sole representative in the European Parliament of the Democratic Forum of Germans in Romania (FDGR/DFDR), part of the European People's Party–European Democrats, and became a MEP on 1 January 2007, along with the accession of Romania to the European Union

== Biography ==
Born to an ethnic German (Banat Swabian) family in Deta, Timiș County, Ganț graduated in Mathematics from the West University of Timișoara, and subsequently taught at the Coriolan Brediceanu High School in Lugoj (1989–1992) and the Nikolaus Lenau High School in Timișoara (1992–2001). In 1995, he received the University of Chicago's Outstanding Teacher Award. Between 1992 and 1995, he was an outside collaborator of both the West University and the Timișoara Polytechnic University, and was a referent for the Romanian-German Chamber of Commerce and Industry in 2003–2004.

A Vice President of the FDGR/DFDR's Banat section, Ganț was appointed to the Romanian government's Department for Inter-Ethnic Relations under Premier Adrian Năstase, and served until 2004. He became a member of the Chamber for Sibiu County after the 2004 election, and served on its Committee for Education, Science, Youth and Sport, as well as on the Parliamentary Committees for European Integration and European Affairs.
