= Căpleni =

Căpleni Kaplony
- Commune
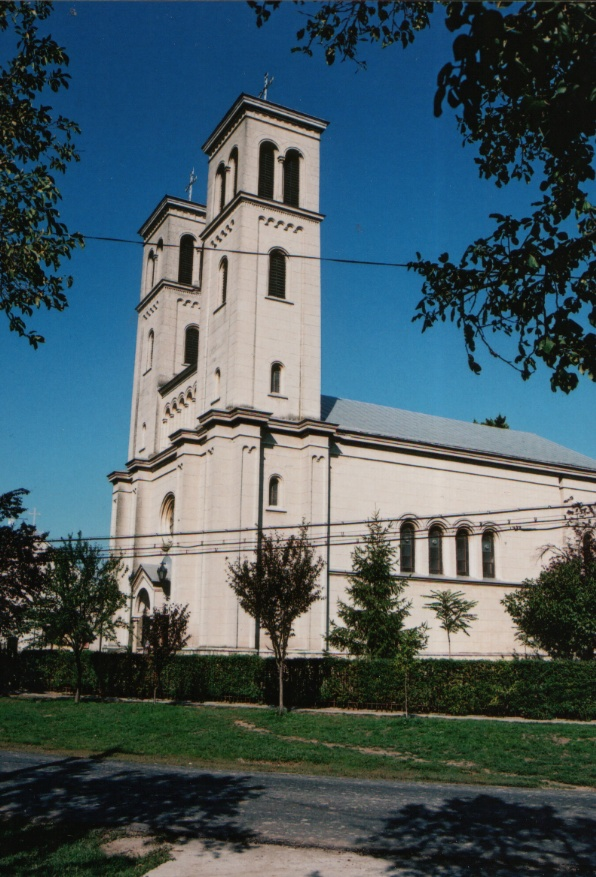
- Saint Anthony of Padua Church

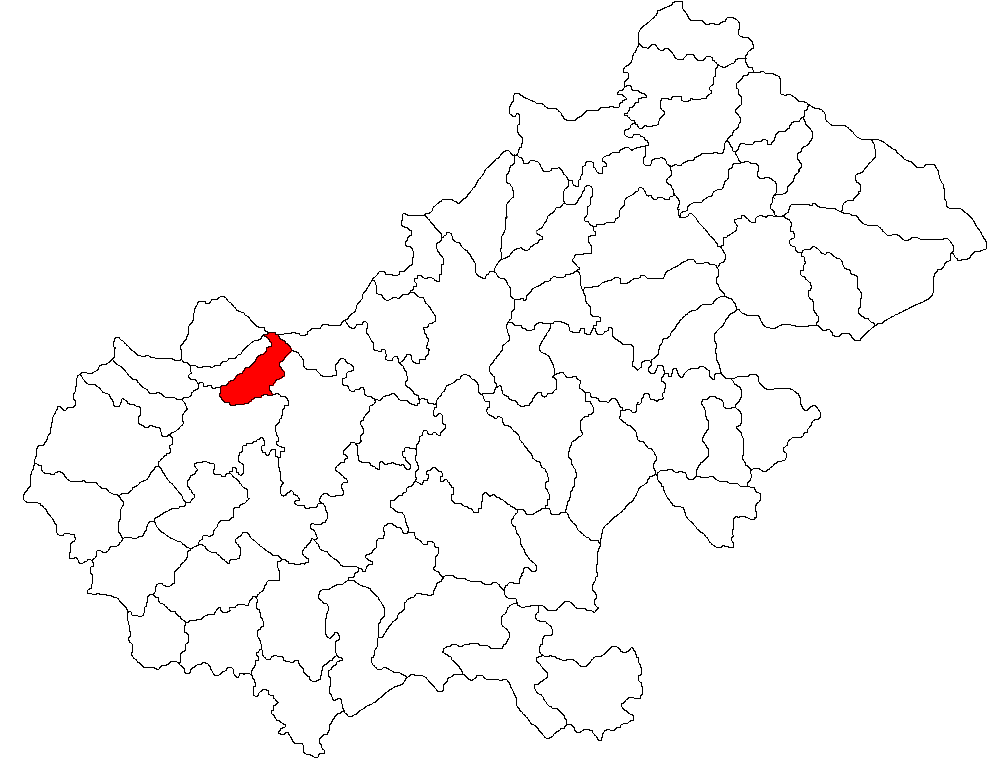
- Location in Satu Mare County

- Location in Romania
- Coordinates: 47°43′N 22°30′E
- Country: Romania
- County: Satu Mare

Government
  - Mayor (2024–2028): Tamás-Róbert Megyeri (UDMR)
- Area: 28.23 km^{2} (10.90 sq mi)
- Elevation: 116 m (381 ft)
- Population (2021-12-01): 2,851
  - Density: 101.0/km^{2} (261.6/sq mi)
- Time zone: UTC+02:00 (EET)
  - Summer (DST): UTC+03:00 (EEST)
- Postal code: 447080
- Vehicle reg.: SM
- Website: www.capleni.ro www.comunacapleni.ro

Căpleni (Hungarian: Kaplony, Hungarian pronunciation: [ˈkɒploɲ]; German: Kaplau) is a commune of 4,349 inhabitants in Satu Mare County, Romania along the border with Hungary. It is composed of a single village, Căpleni, and also included the village of Cămin until 2002, when it was split off to form a separate commune.

The commune is located in the western part of the county, on the bank of the Crasna River, at a distance of 4 km (2.5 mi) north of Carei and 40 km (25 mi) from the county seat, Satu Mare.

== Administration ==
The current local council has the following political composition, based on the results of the votes cast at the 2024 Romanian local elections.

Party	Seats	Current Council
Democratic Alliance of Hungarians in Romania (UDMR/RMDSZ)	11	
Democratic Forum of Germans in Romania (FDGR/DFDR)	2	

== Etymology ==
The name "Căpleni" is the Romanian version of its Hungarian name, Kaplony, which derives from an Old Turkic personal name meaning "tiger".

== Demographics ==
Ethnic groups (2011 census):

- Hungarians (90.4%)
- Roma (4%)
- Romanians (3.1%)
- Germans (2.4%)

== Natives ==
- Robert Roszel
