= Emigration from Germany =

Emigration from Germany:

- For a general overview of the topic, see German diaspora
- For the emigration of German Jews during the Nazi regime, see Emigration of Jews from Nazi Germany and German-occupied Europe
- For historical emigration patterns to Central and Eastern Europe, see:
  - Ostsiedlung
  - History of German settlement in Central and Eastern Europe
- For the instrumentalization of ethnic Germans in Central and Eastern Europe by the Nazi regime, see Volksdeutsche

== See also ==
- Category:German emigrants
