= Robert Roszel =

Romanian footballer

Personal information
- Date of birth: 30 January 1983 (age 43)
- Place of birth: Căpleni, Romania
- Height: 1.75 m (5 ft 9 in)
- Position: Striker

Team information
- Current team: Nyirbátori FC (on loan from Cigánd SE)

Senior career*
| Years | Team | Apps | (Gls) |
| 1999–2000 | Someşul Satu Mare | | (?) |
| 2000–2004 | Olimpia Satu Mare | 104 | (23) |
| 2004–2006 | CFR Cluj | 14 | (3) |
| 2006–2007 | Gloria Bistriţa | 19 | (0) |
| 2007–2008 | UTA Arad | 15 | (1) |
| 2008–2009 | CSM Râmnicu Vâlcea | ? | (?) |
| 2009–2010 | FC Baia Mare | 6 | (5) |
| 2010 | Diósgyőri VTK | 9 | (0) |
| 2011 | FCMU Baia Mare | 9 | (4) |
| 2011– | Cigánd SE | 50 | (23) |
| 2017– | → Nyirbátori FC (loan) | 0 | (0) |

International career
| 2001 | Romania U19 | 5 | (2) |
- * Club domestic league appearances and goals as of 1 January 2015

Robert Roszel (born 30 January 1983 in Căpleni, Satu Mare County) is a Romanian footballer of German ethnicity who plays for Nyirbátori FC on loan from Cigánd SE. Roszel has been plagued by injuries since 2004, which made him lose a year and a half of playing time. He was also a Romanian Under-19 international scoring two goals for the U-19 team. Roszel is a striker.
