= History of German settlement in Central and Eastern Europe =

The presence of German-speaking populations in Central and Eastern Europe is rooted in centuries of history, with the settling in northeastern Europe of Germanic peoples predating even the founding of the Roman Empire. The presence of independent German states in the region (particularly Prussia), and later the German Empire as well as other multi-ethnic countries with German-speaking minorities, such as Hungary, Poland, Imperial Russia, etc., demonstrates the extent and duration of German-speaking settlements.

The number of ethnic Germans in Central and Eastern Europe dropped dramatically as the result of the post-1944 German flight and expulsion from Central and Eastern Europe. There are still substantial numbers of ethnic Germans in the Central European countries that are now Germany and Austria's neighbors to the east—Poland, Czechia, Slovakia, and Hungary. Finland, the Baltics (Estonia, Latvia, Lithuania), the Balkans (Slovenia, Croatia, Bosnia, Serbia, Romania, Bulgaria, Turkey), Eastern Europe (Moldova, Ukraine, Belarus, Russia), the Caucasus (Georgia, Armenia, Azerbaijan), and Kazakhstan also have smaller but still significant numbers of citizens of German descent.

== Early Middle Ages settlement area ==
During the 4th and 5th centuries, in what is known as the Migration Period, Germanic peoples (ancient Germans) seized control of the decaying Western Roman Empire in the South and established new kingdoms within it. Meanwhile, formerly Germanic areas in Eastern Europe and present-day Eastern Germany, were settled by Slavs.

In the early Middle Ages, Charlemagne had subdued a variety of Germanic peoples in Central Europe dwelling in an area roughly bordered by the Alps in the South, the Vosges Mountains in the West, the North Sea and Elbe River in the North and the Saale River in the East. These heterogeneous Germanic peoples comprised several tribes and groups who either formed, stayed or migrated into this area during the Migration Period.

After the Carolingian Empire was divided, these people found themselves in the eastern part, known as East Francia or Regnum Teutonicum, and over time became known as Germans. The area was divided into the stem duchies of Swabia (Alamannia), Franconia, Saxony, and Bavaria (including Carinthia). Later, the Holy Roman Empire would be constituted largely, but not exclusively of these regions.

== Medieval settlements (Ostsiedlung) ==
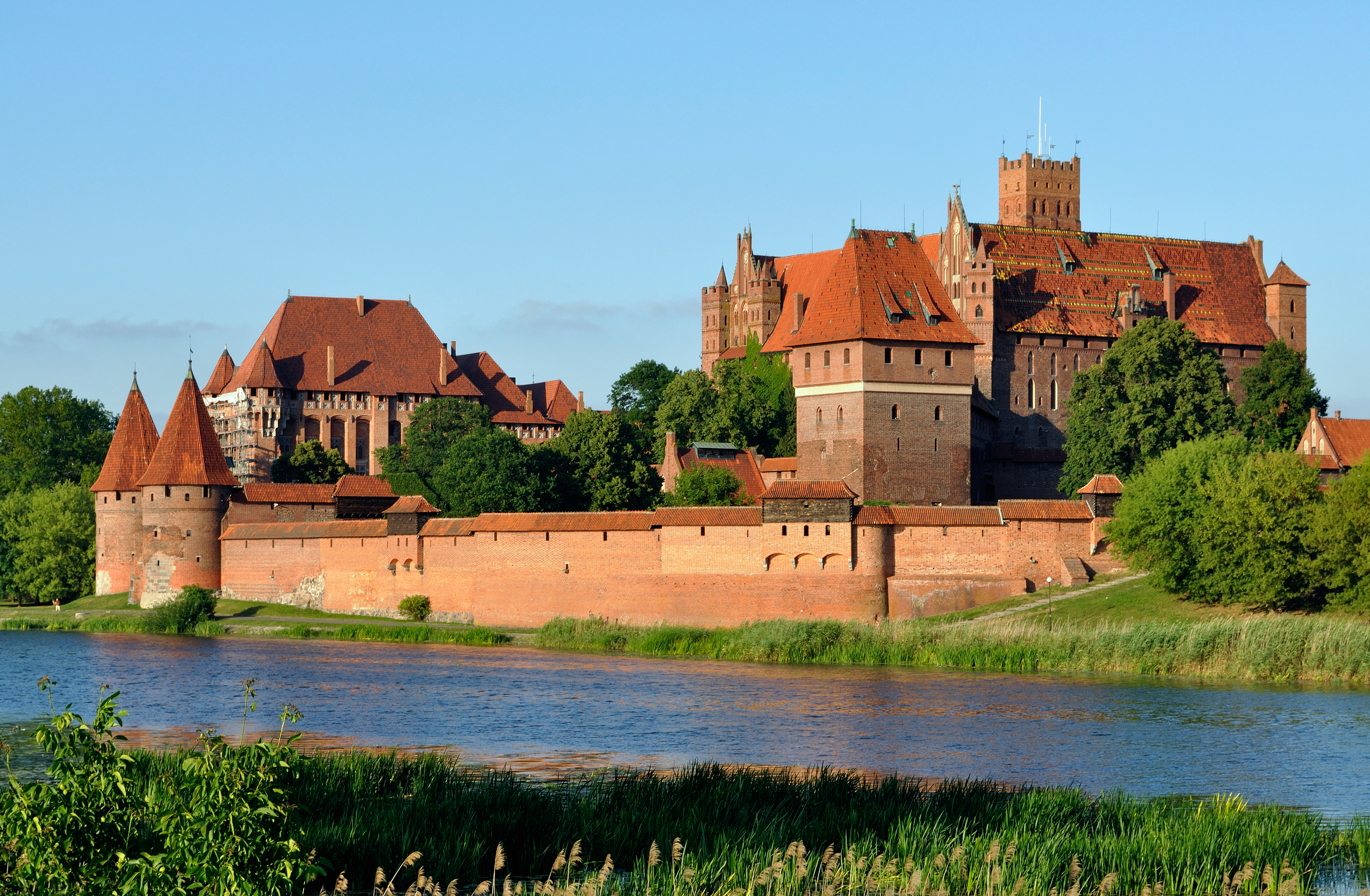
The fortress Ordensburg Marienburg in Malbork, founded in 1274, the world's largest brick castle and the Teutonic Order's headquarters on the river Nogat.

The medieval German Ostsiedlung (literally Settling eastwards), also known as the German eastward expansion or East colonization refers to the expansion of German culture, language, states, and settlements to vast regions of Northeastern, Central and Eastern Europe, previously inhabited since the Great Migrations by Balts, Finno-Ugrics and, since about the 6th century, the Slavs. The affected territory stretched roughly from modern Estonia in the North to modern Slovenia in the South.

Population growth during the High Middle Ages stimulated the movement of peoples from the Rhenish, Flemish, and Saxon territories of the Holy Roman Empire eastwards into the less populated Baltic region and Poland. These movements were supported by the German nobility, the Slavic kings and dukes, and the medieval Church. The majority of this settlement was peaceful, although it sometimes took place at the expense of Slavs and pagan Balts (see Northern Crusades). Ostsiedlung accelerated along the Baltic with the advent of the Teutonic Order. Likewise, in Styria and Carinthia, German communities took form in areas inhabited by Slovenes.

In the middle of the 14th century, the settling progress slowed as a result of the Black Death; in addition, the most arable and promising regions were largely occupied. Local Slavic leaders in late Medieval Pomerania and Silesia continued inviting German settlers to their territories.

In the outcome, all previously Wendish territory were settled by a German majority and the Wends were almost completely assimilated. In areas further east, substantial German minorities were established, which either kept their customs or were assimilated by the host population. The density of villages and towns increased dramatically. German town law was introduced to most towns of the area, regardless of the percentage of German inhabitants.

=== Areas settled during Ostsiedlung ===
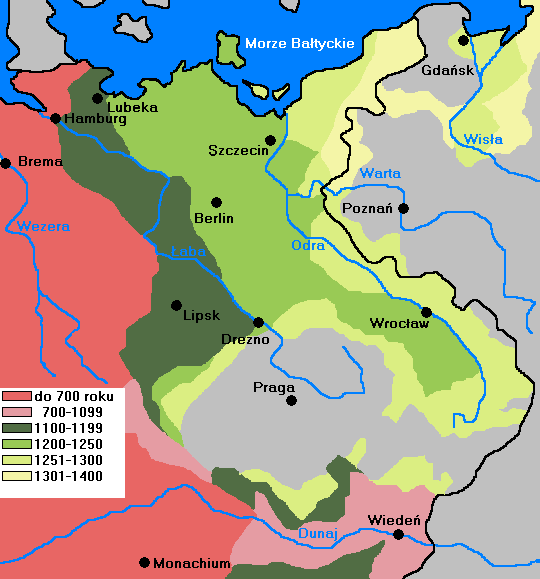
Stages of German eastern settlement, 1100–1400

The following areas saw German settlement during the Ostsiedlung:

- within current eastern and northern Germany: Brandenburg, Mecklenburg-Vorpommern, Saxony, Saxony-Anhalt, Holstein
- Bohemia and Moravia, specifically Sudetenland (Sudeten Germans)
- Prussia, especially western parts, with southern and north-eastern parts largely settled by Poles and Lithuanians, respectively (now divided between Poland and Russia)
- Poland, including the regions of Silesia and Pomerania (see History of Poland during the Piast dynasty)

Walddeutsche

- New March, i.e. Brandenburgian-annexed territories of western Poland
- Duchy of Pomerania (now divided between Poland and Germany)
- Transylvania as well as significant parts of Moldavia (especially Bukovina) and Wallachia (Transylvanian Saxons)
- Carpathian Mountains (Carpathian Germans)
- Memelland and Livonia (now in Lithuania, Estonia and Latvia) (Baltic Germans)
- Bulgaria (see Germans in Bulgaria)
- Slovenia (see Gottscheers)
- and others

=== German-run enterprises resulting in German settlements ===
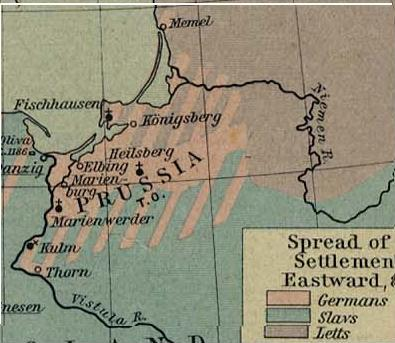
The ethnic composition of Prussia by the 14th century. The term Letts is a historical name for Latvians, although the Lett-marked territories mark in general baltic people groups without distinctions, then Latvians, whereas the term Slavs in the marked area mostly refers to Poles

==== Hanseatic League ====
Between the 13th and 17th centuries, trade in the Baltic Sea and Central Europe (beyond Germany) became dominated by German trade through the Hanseatic League. The league was a predominantly Low-German-speaking military alliance of trading guilds that established and maintained a trade monopoly over the Baltic and to a certain extent the North Sea. Hanseatic towns and trade stations usually hosted relatively large German populations, with merchant dynasties being the wealthiest and political dominant fractions.

==== Teutonic Knights ====
From the second half of the 13th century to the 15th century, the crusading Teutonic Knights ruled Prussia through their monastic state, and annexed Eastern Pomerania with Gdańsk from Poland in the 14th century. As a consequence, German settlement accelerated along the southeastern coast of the Baltic Sea. These areas, centered around Gdańsk (Danzig) and Königsberg, remained one of the largest closed German settlement area outside the Holy Roman Empire.

== 17th to 19th century settlements ==
=== Thirty Years' War aftermath ===
When the Thirty Years' War devastated Central Europe, many areas were completely deserted, others suffered severe population drops. These areas were in part resettled by Germans from areas hit less. Some of the deserted villages, however, were not repopulated - that is why the Middle Ages' density of settlements was higher than today's.

=== Poland ===
In the 16th and 17th centuries, settlers from the Netherlands and Friesland, often of Mennonite faith, founded villages in the province of Royal Prussia, along the Vistula River and its tributaries, and in Kuyavia, Mazovia and Greater Poland. The law under which these villages were organized was called the Dutch or Olęder law; such villages were called Holendry or Olędry. The inhabitants of such villages were called Olędrzy, regardless of their ethnicity. In fact, the vast majority of Olęder villages in Poland were settled by ethnic Germans, usually Lutherans, who spoke the Low German dialect called Plautdietsch.

=== Danube Swabians of Hungary and the Balkans ===
With the decline of the Ottoman Empire, German settlers were called into devastated areas of Hungary, by then comprising a larger area than today, in the late 17th century. The Danube Swabians settled in Swabian Turkey and other areas, more settlers were called in even throughout the 18th century, in part to secure Hungary's frontier with the Ottomans. The Banat Swabians and Satu Mare Swabians are examples of Danube Swabian settlers from the 18th century.

An influx of Danube Swabians also occurred toward the Adriatic coast in what would later become Yugoslavia.

Settlers from Salzkammergut were called into Transylvania to repopulate areas devastated by the wars with the Turks. They became known as Transylvanian Landler.

=== Galicia ===
After the First Partition of Poland the Austrian Empire took control of south Poland, later known as Kingdom of Galicia and Lodomeria. The colonization of the new crown land began afterwards, especially under the rule of Joseph II.

=== Russian Empire ===
Since 1762, Russia called in German settlers. Some settled the Volga area northwest of Kazakhstan and therefore became known as Volga Germans. Others settled toward the coast of the Black Sea (Black Sea Germans, including Bessarabia Germans, Dobrujan Germans, and Crimea Germans) and the Caucasus area (Caucasus Germans). These settlements occurred throughout the late 18th and the 19th centuries.

In the late 19th century, many Vistula Germans (or Olędrzy) immigrated to Volhynia, as did descendants of early Mennonite settlers, whose ancestors had lived in West Prussia since the Ostsiedlung. Prussia imposed heavy taxes due to their pacifist beliefs. In Russia, they became hence known as Russian Mennonites.

According to the 1926 (1939) census, there were 1,238,000 (1,424,000) Germans living in the Soviet Union, respectively.

=== Turkey ===
Since the 1840s, Germans moved to Turkey who by then had become an ally of the German Empire. Those settling in the Istanbul area became known as Bosporus Germans.

== 1871–1914 ==
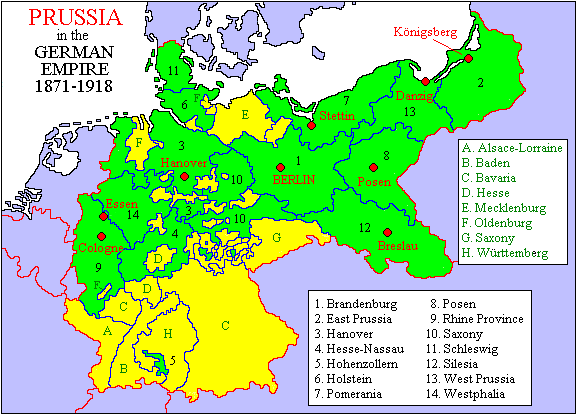
Prussia (green) within the German Empire 1871–1918.

A map of Austria-Hungary, showing areas inhabited by ethnic Germans in red according to the 1910 census.

By the 19th century, every city of even modest size as far east as Russia had a German quarter and a Jewish quarter. Travellers along any road would pass through, for example, a German village, then a Czech village, then a Polish village, etc., depending on the region.

Certain parts of Central and Eastern Europe beyond Germany, especially those close to the border of Germany contained areas in which ethnic Germans constituted a majority.

=== German Empire and European nationalism ===
The latter half of the 19th century and the first half of the 20th century saw the rise of nationalism in Europe. Previously, a country consisted largely of whatever peoples lived on the land that was under the dominion of a particular ruler. Thus, as principalities and kingdoms grew through conquest and marriage, a ruler could wind up with peoples of many different ethnicities under his dominion.

The concept of nationalism was based on the idea of a people who shared a common bond through race, religion, language and culture. Furthermore, nationalism asserted that each people had a right to its own nation. Thus, much of European history in the latter half of the 19th century and the first half of the 20th century can be understood as efforts to realign national boundaries with this concept of "one people, one nation".

In 1871, the German Empire was founded, partly as a German nation-state. This is closely associated with chancellor Otto von Bismarck. While the empire included German settled Prussian regions formerly outside of its predecessors, it also included areas with Danish, Kashub and other minorities. In some areas, such as the Province of Posen or the southern part of Upper Silesia, the majority of the population were Poles.

Ethnic German Austria remained outside the empire, and so did many German-settled or mixed regions of Central and Eastern Europe. Most German settled regions of South Central and Southeastern Europe were instead included in the multi-ethnic Habsburg monarchy of Austria-Hungary.

=== Ostflucht ===
Starting in the late 19th century, an inner-Prussian migration took place from the very rural eastern to the prospering urban western provinces of Prussia (notably to the Ruhr area and Cologne), a phenomenon termed Ostflucht. As a consequence, these migrations increased the percentage of the Polish population in Posen and West Prussia.

Driven by nationalist intentions, the Prussian state established a Settlement Commission as countermeasure, that was to settle more Germans in these regions. In total 21,886 families (154,704 people) out of planned 40,000 were settled by the end of its existence. The history of the forced expulsions of the Polish population is further explored in the Expulsion of Poles by Germany.

== 1914–1939 ==
=== World War I ===
By World War I, there were isolated groups of Germans as far southeast as the Bosporus (Turkey), Georgia, and Azerbaijan. After the war, Germany's and Austria-Hungary's territorial losses meant that more Germans than ever were minorities in various countries, the treatment they received varied from country to country, and they were, in places subject to resentful persecution from former enemies of Germany. Perceptions of this persecution filtered back into Germany, where reports were exploited and amplified by the Nazi party as part of their drive to national popularity as savior of the German people.

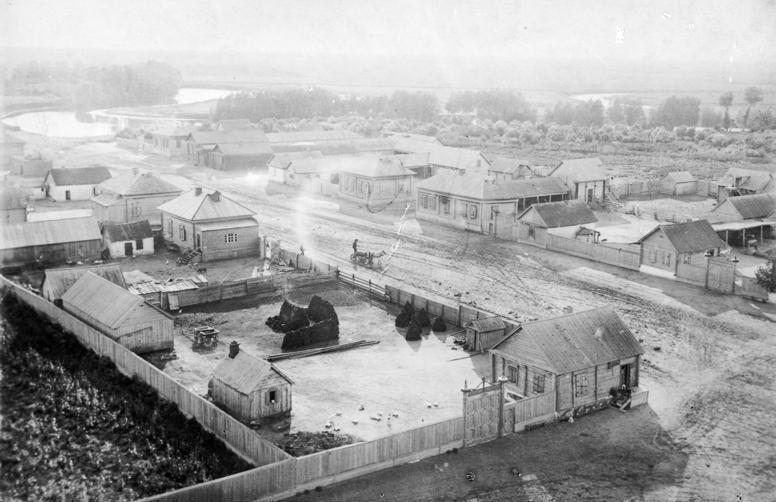
Streckerau an der Wolga: a German village in Russia, 1920.

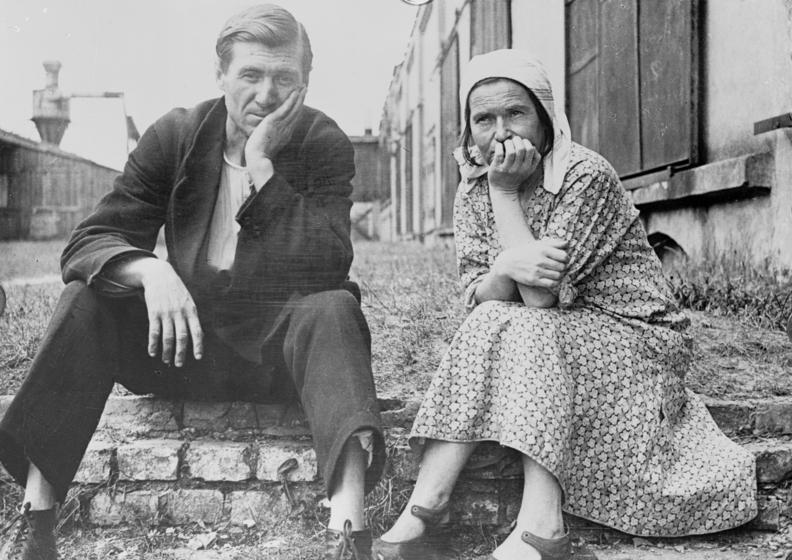
Russian German refugees stranded in Schneidemühl (Piła), 1920.

The advance of allied German Empire and Habsburg monarchy forces into the Russian Empire's territory triggered actions of flight, evacuation and deportation of the population living in or near the combat zone. Russian Germans became subject to severe measures because of their ethnicity, including forced resettlement and deportation to Russia's East, ban of German language from public life (including books and newspapers), and denial of economical means (jobs and land property) based on "liquidation laws" issued since 1915; also Germans (as well as the rest of the population) were hit by "scorched earth" tactics of the retreating Russians.

About 300,000 Russian Germans became subject to deportations to Siberia and the Bashkir steppe, of those 70,000-200,000 were Germans from Volhynia, 20,000 were Germans from Podolia, 10,000 were Germans from the Kiev area, and another 11,000 were Germans from the Chernihiv area.

From Russian areas controlled by the German, Austrian and Hungarian forces, large scale resettlements of Germans to these areas were organized by Fürsorgeverein ("Welfare Union"), resettling 60,000 Russian Germans, and Deutsche Arbeiterzentrale ("German Workers' Bureau"), resettling 25,000-40,000 Russian Germans. Two thirds of these persons were resettled to East Prussia, most of the remaining in the northeastern provinces of Prussia and Mecklenburg.

=== Danzig and the Polish corridor ===
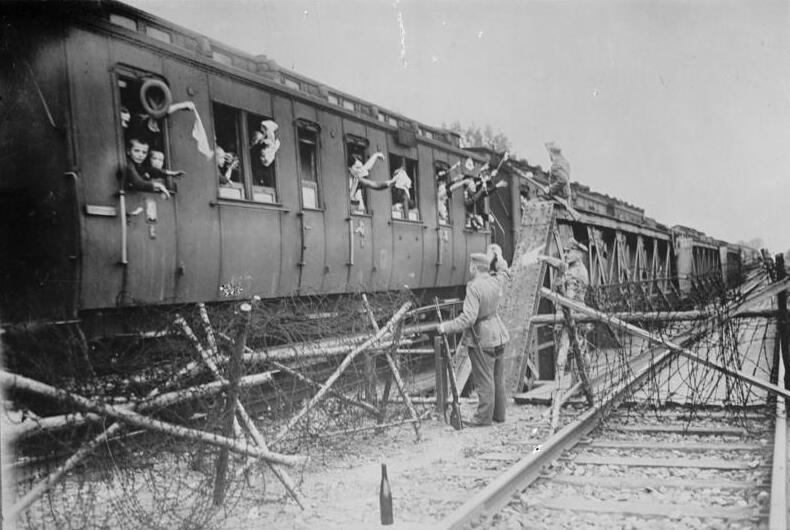
Germans from the former Province of Posen cross the demarcation line at Zbąszyń, 1920.

When Poland regained its independence after World War I, the Poles hoped to regain the city of Danzig to provide the free access to the sea which they had been promised by the Allies on the basis of Woodrow Wilson's "Fourteen Points". Since the population of the city was predominantly German it was not placed under Polish sovereignty. It became the Free City of Danzig, an independent quasi-state under the auspices of the League of Nations governed by its German residents but with its external affairs largely under Polish control. The Free City had its own constitution, national anthem, parliament (Volkstag), and government (Senat). It issued its own stamps and currency, bearing the legend "Freie Stadt Danzig" and symbols of the city's maritime orientation and history.

From the Polish Corridor, many ethnic Germans were forced to leave throughout the 1920s and 1930s, while Poles settled in the region building the sea port city Gdynia (Gdingen) next to Danzig. The vast majority of Danzig's population favoured eventual return to Germany. In the early 1930s the Nazi Party capitalized on these pro-German sentiments, and in 1933 garnered 38 percent of vote for the Danzig Volkstag. Thereafter, the Nazis under the Bavaria-born Gauleiter Albert Forster achieved dominance in the city government - which, nominally, was still overseen by the League of Nations' High Commissioner.

Nazi demands, at their minimum, would have seen the return of Danzig to Germany and a one kilometer, state-controlled route for easier access across the Polish Corridor, from Pomerania to Danzig (and from there to East Prussia). Originally, the Poles had rejected this proposal, but later appeared willing to negotiate (as did the British) by August. By this time, however, Hitler had Soviet backing and had decided to attack Poland. Germany feigned an interest in diplomacy (delaying the Case White deadline twice), to try to drive a wedge between Britain and Poland.

=== Nazi claims to Lebensraum and resettlements of Germans before the war ===
In the 19th century, the rise of romantic nationalism in Germany had led to the concepts of Pan-Germanism and Drang nach Osten, which in part gave rise to the concept of Lebensraum.

German nationalists used the existence of large German minorities in other countries as a basis for territorial claims. Many of the propaganda themes of the Nazi regime against Czechoslovakia and Poland claimed that the ethnic Germans (Volksdeutsche) in those territories were persecuted. There were many incidents of persecution of Germans in the interwar period, including the French invasion of Germany proper in the 1920s.

The German state was weak until 1933 and could not even protect itself under the terms of the Treaty of Versailles. The status of ethnic Germans, and the lack of contiguity of German majority lands resulted in numerous repatriation pacts whereby the German authorities would organize population transfers (especially the Nazi-Soviet population transfers arranged between Adolf Hitler and Joseph Stalin, and others with Benito Mussolini's Italy) so that both Germany and the other country would increase their homogeneity.

However, these population transfers were considered but a drop in the pond, and the "Heim ins Reich" rhetoric over the continued disjoint status of enclaves such as Danzig and Königsberg was an agitating factor in the politics leading up to World War II, and is considered by many to be among the major causes of Nazi aggressiveness and thus the war. Adolf Hitler used these issues as a pretext for waging wars of aggression against Czechoslovakia and Poland.

== Nazi settlement concepts during World War II (1939–45) ==
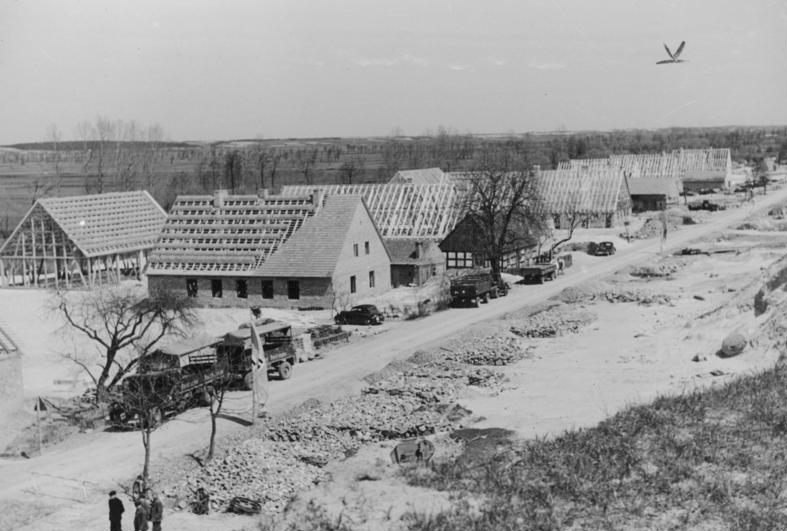
New houses for resettled Germans in Reichsgau Wartheland in occupied Poland, 1940.

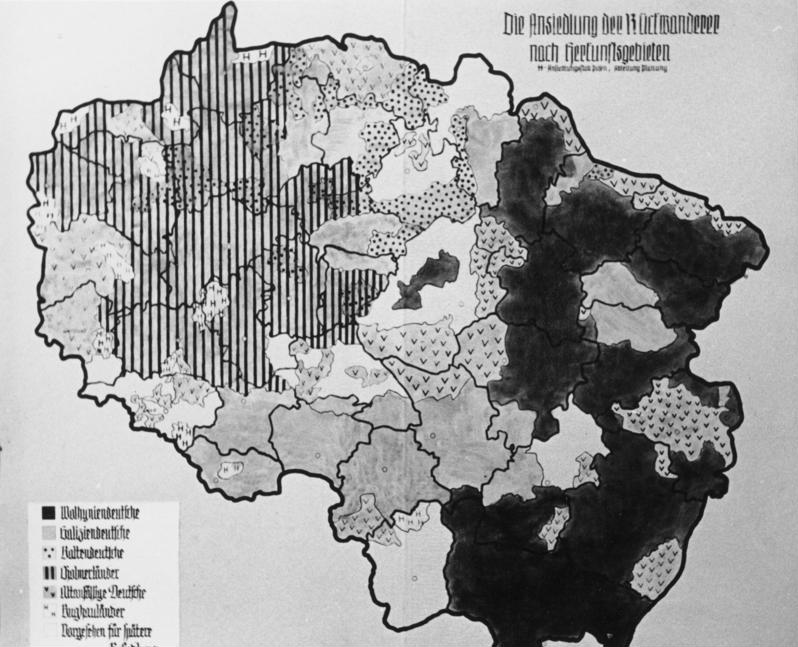
Planned resettlements in Reichsgau Wartheland in occupied Poland

The status of ethnic Germans, and the lack of contiguity resulted in numerous repatriation pacts whereby the German authorities would organize population transfers (especially the Nazi–Soviet population transfers arranged between Adolf Hitler and Joseph Stalin, and others with Benito Mussolini's Italy) so that both Germany and the other country would increase their "ethnic homogeneity".

=== Resettlement of Germans from the Baltic States and Bessarabia ===
German populations affected by the population exchanges were primarily the Baltic Germans and Bessarabia Germans and others who were forced to resettle west of the Curzon Line. The Molotov–Ribbentrop Pact had defined "spheres of interest", assigning the states between Nazi Germany and the Soviet Union to either one of those.

Except for Memelland, the Baltic states were assigned to the Soviet Union, and Germany started pulling out the Volksdeutsche population after reaching respective agreements with Estonia and Latvia in October 1939. The Baltic Germans were to be resettled in occupied Poland and compensated for their losses with confiscated property at their new settlements. Though resettlement was voluntary, most Germans followed the call because they feared repression once the Soviets would move in.

Eventually, this actually happened to the ones who stayed. The Baltic Germans were moved to Germany's northeastern port cities by ship. Poles were expelled from Polish Pomerania, under German occupation organized as Reichsgau Danzig-West Prussia, to make space available for resettlement, but due to quarrels with the Gauleiter Albert Forster, resettlement stalled and further "repatriants" were moved to Poznań.

=== Resettlement of Germans from Italy ===
On October 6, 1939, Hitler announced a resettlement program for the German-speaking population of the Italian province of South Tyrol. With an initial thought to resettle the population in occupied Poland or the Crimea, they were actually moved to places in nearby Austria and Bavaria. Also affected were German speakers from other areas in northern Italy, like the Kanaltal and Grödnertal valleys. Resettlement stopped with the collapse of Mussolini's regime and the subsequent occupation of Italy by Nazi Germany.

=== German "Volksdeutsche" in Nazi-occupied Europe ===
The actions of Germany ultimately had extremely negative consequences for most ethnic Germans in Central and Eastern Europe (termed Volksdeutsche to distinguish them from Germans from within the Third Reich, the Reichsdeutsche), who often fought on the side of the Nazi regime - some were drafted, others volunteered or worked through the paramilitary organisations such as Selbstschutz, which supported the German invasion of Poland and murdered tens of thousands of Poles.

In places such as Yugoslavia, Germans were drafted by their country of residence, served loyally, and were even held as POWs by the Nazis, and yet later found themselves drafted again, this time by the Nazis after their takeover. Because it was technically not permissible to draft non-citizens, many ethnic Germans ended up being (oxymoronically) forcibly volunteered for the Waffen-SS. In general, those closest to Nazi Germany were the most involved in fighting for her, but the Germans in remote places like the Caucasus were likewise accused of collaboration.

== German exodus after Nazi Germany's defeat ==
The 20th century wars annihilated most Eastern and East Central European German settlements, and the remaining sparse pockets of settlement were subject to emigration to Germany in the late 20th century for economic reasons.

=== Evacuation, and flight of Germans during the end of World War II ===
By late 1944, after the Soviet success of the Belorussian Offensive in August 1944, the Eastern Front became relatively stable. Romania and Bulgaria had been forced to surrender and declare war on Germany. The Germans had lost Budapest and most of the rest of Hungary. The plains of Poland were now open to the Soviet Red Army. Starting on January 12, 1945, the Red Army began the Vistula–Oder Offensive which was followed a day later by the start of the Red Army's East Prussian Offensive.

German populations in Central and Eastern Europe took flight from the advancing Red Army, resulting in a great population shift. After the final Soviet offensives began in January 1945, hundreds of thousands of German refugees, many of whom had fled to Danzig by foot from East Prussia (see evacuation of East Prussia), tried to escape through the city's port in a large-scale evacuation that employed hundreds of German cargo and passenger ships. Some of the ships were sunk by the Soviets, including the Wilhelm Gustloff, after an evacuation was attempted at neighboring Gdynia. In the process, tens of thousands of refugees were killed.

Cities such as Danzig also endured heavy Western Allied and Soviet bombardment. Those who survived and could not escape encountered the Red Army. On 30 March 1945, the Soviets captured the city and left it in ruins.

=== The Yalta Conference ===
As it became evident that the Allies were going to defeat Nazi Germany decisively, the question arose as to how to redraw the borders of Central and Eastern European countries after the war. In the context of those decisions, the problem arose of what to do about ethnic minorities within the redrawn borders.

The final decision to move Poland's boundary westward was made by the US, Britain and the Soviets at the Yalta Conference, shortly before the end of the war. The precise location of the border was left open. The western Allies also accepted in general the principle of the Oder River as the future western border of Poland and of population transfer as the way to prevent future border disputes. The open question was whether the border should follow the eastern or western Neisse rivers, and whether Stettin, the traditional seaport of Berlin, should remain German or be included in Poland. The western Allies sought to place the border on the eastern Neisse, but Stalin insisted that the border should be on the western Neisse.

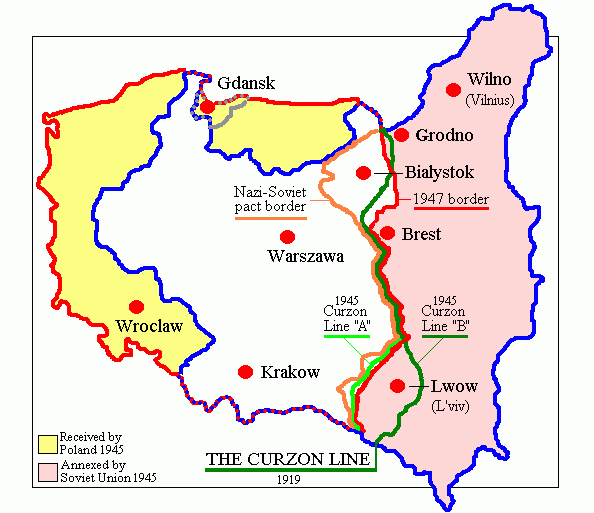
Poland's old and new borders, 1945.

=== The Potsdam Conference ===
At the Potsdam Conference the United States, the United Kingdom, and the Soviet Union placed the German territories east of the Oder-Neisse line (Poland referred to by the Polish communist government as the "Western Territories" or "Recovered Territories") as formally under Polish administrative control. It was anticipated that a final peace treaty would follow shortly and either confirm this border or determine whatever alterations might be agreed upon.

The final agreements in effect compensated Poland for 187,000 km^{2} located east of the Curzon Line with 112,000 km^{2} of former German territories. The northeastern third of East Prussia was directly annexed by the Soviet Union and remains part of Russia to this day.

It was also decided that all Germans remaining in the new and old Polish territory should be expelled, to prevent any claims of minority rights. Among the provisions of the Potsdam Conference was a section that provided for the orderly transfer of German populations. The specific wording of this section was as follows:

The Three Governments, having considered the question in all its aspects, recognize that the transfer to Germany of German populations, or elements thereof, remaining in Poland, Czechoslovakia and Hungary, will have to be undertaken. They agree that any transfers that take place should be effected in an orderly and humane manner.

=== Expulsion of Germans after World War II ===
The expulsion of Germans after World War II refers to the expulsion of German colonists and collaborationists from the former eastern territories of Germany, former Sudetenland and other areas across Europe in the first five years after World War II.

It was the largest of a number of expulsions in various Central and Eastern European countries affecting a number of nationalities. The Big Three had agreed on a policy of expulsions, and the Soviet Union, Czechoslovakia and Poland implemented the policy with American and British acquiescence. The policy had been agreed on by the Allies as part of the reconfiguration of postwar Europe.

As the Red Army advanced towards Germany at the end of World War II, a considerable exodus of German refugees began from the areas near the front lines. Many Germans fled their areas of residence under vague and haphazardly implemented evacuation orders of the Nazi German government in 1943, 1944, and in early 1945, or based on their own decisions to leave in 1945 to 1948. Others remained and were later forced to leave by local authorities. Census figures in 1950 place the total number of ethnic Germans still living in Central and Eastern Europe at approximately 2.6 million, about 12 percent of the pre-war total.

The majority of the flights and expulsions occurred in Czechoslovakia, Poland and the European Soviet Union. Others occurred in territories of northern Yugoslavia (predominantly in the Vojvodina region), and other regions of Central and Eastern Europe.

The total number of the Germans expelled after the war will remain unknown, but was estimated by various scientific approaches. Most of the past research provided a combined estimate of 13.5-16.5 million people, including those that were evacuated by German authorities, fled or were killed during the war. However, recent research places the number at above 12 million, including all those who fled during the war or migrated later, forcibly or otherwise, to both the Western and Eastern zones of Germany and to Austria.

Recent analyses have led some historians to conclude that the actual number of deaths attributable to the flight and expulsions was in the range of 500,000 to 1.1 million. The earlier higher figures, up to 3.2 million, typically include all war-related deaths of ethnic Germans between 1939 and 1945, including those who served in the German armed forces.

When Romania signed a peace treaty with the Soviets in 1944, the German military began withdrawing the Transylvanian Saxons from Transylvania; this operation was most thorough with the Saxons of the Nösnerland. Around 100,000 Germans fled before the Soviet Red Army, but Romania did not conduct the expulsion of Germans as did neighboring countries at war's end. However, more than 80,000 Saxons were arrested by the Soviet Army and sent to labour camps in Siberia for alleged cooperation with Germany.

Most of those belonging to the Yugoslavian-German minority were interned at camps and eventually expelled from the country. The majority went to Austria and West Germany. However, there were a number of people who stayed, because they were married to local partners. These people and their descendants were no longer officially considered a part of the German population.

== Recent history ==
=== Expelled Germans in postwar Germany ===
After World War II, many expellees (German: Heimatvertriebene) from the land east of the Oder-Neisse found refuge in both West Germany and East Germany. Refugees who had fled voluntarily but were later refused to return are often not distinguished from those who were forcibly deported, such as people born to German parents that moved into areas under German occupation either on their own or as Nazi colonists.

In a document signed 50 years ago the Heimatvertriebene organisations have also recognized the plight of the different groups of people living in today's Poland who were by force resettled there. The Heimatvertriebene are just one of the groups of millions of other people, from many different countries, who all found refuge in today's Germany.

Some of the expellees are active in politics and belong to the political right-wing. Many others do not belong to any organizations, but they continue to maintain what they call a lawful right to their homeland. The vast majority pledged to work peacefully towards that goal while rebuilding post-war Germany and Europe.

The expellees are still highly active in German politics, and are one of the major political factions of the nation, with still around 2 million members. The president of their organization is as of 2004 still a member of the national parliament.

Although expellees (in German Heimatvertriebene) and their descendants were active in West German politics, the prevailing political climate within West Germany was that of atonement for Nazi actions. However, the CDU governments have shown considerable support for the expellees and German civilian victims.

=== Polish–German relations ===
Relations between Poland and the Federal Republic of Germany have generally been cordial since 1991.

==== Status of the German minority in Poland ====
The remaining German minority in Poland (152,897 people according to the 2002 census) has minority rights on the basis of the Polish–German treaty and minority law. German parties are not subject to the 5% threshold during the Sejm elections so Germans are able to obtain two seats. There are German speakers throughout Poland, but only the voivodeship of Opole/Oppeln has a larger concentration.

==== Finalization of the Polish–German border ====
For decades, the CDU-controlled German government considered the Oder–Neisse line to be completely unacceptable. Even the Social Democrats of the SPD initially refused to accept the Oder–Neisse line. The 1991 Polish–German border agreement finalized the Oder–Neisse line as the Polish–German border. The agreement gave to minority groups in both countries several rights, such as the right to use national surnames, speak their native languages, and attend schools and churches of their choice. These rights had been denied previously on the basis that the individual had already chosen the country in which they wanted to live.

==== Restricting sale of property to foreigners ====
In November 2005 Der Spiegel published a poll from the Allensbach Institute which estimated that 61% of Poles believed Germans would try to get back territories that were formerly under German control or demand compensation.

There are also some worries among Poles that rich descendants of the expelled Germans would buy the land awarded to the Polish state in 1945. It is believed that this may result in large price increases, since the current Polish land price is relatively low. This led to Polish restrictions on the sale of property to foreigners, including Germans: special permission is needed. This policy is comparable to similar restrictions on the Baltic Åland. These restrictions were lifted 12 years after the 2004 accession of Poland to the European Union, i.e. on May 1, 2016. The restrictions were weak and not valid for companies and certain types of properties.

The attempts by German organisations to build a Centre Against Expulsions dedicated to German people's suffering during World War II has led Polish politicians and activists to propose a Center for Martyrology of Polish Nation (called also Center for the Memory of Suffering of the Polish Nation) that would document the systematical oppression conducted on Polish people by German state during World War II and which would serve to educate German people about atrocities their state and regime conducted on their neighbours. However, this proposal was attacked and rejected by German politicians.

=== German minority in the Czech Republic ===
There are about 40,000 Germans remaining in the Czech Republic. Their number has been consistently decreasing since World War II. According to the 2001 census there remain 13 municipalities and settlements in the Czech Republic with more than 10% Germans.

The situation in Slovakia was different from that in the Czech lands, in that the number of Germans was considerably lower and that the Germans from Slovakia were almost completely evacuated to German states as the Soviet army was moving west through Slovakia, and only the fraction of them that returned to Slovakia after the end of the war was deported together with the Germans from the Czech lands.

The Czech Republic has introduced a law in 2002 that guarantees the use of native minority languages (incl. German) as official languages in municipalities where autochthonous linguistic groups make up at least 10% of the population. Besides the use in dealings with officials and in courts the law also allows for bilingual signage and guarantees education in the native language.

==== Czech–German relations ====
On 28 December 1989, Václav Havel, at that time a candidate for president of Czechoslovakia (he was elected one day later), suggested that Czechoslovakia should apologize for the expulsion of ethnic Germans after World War II. Most other politicians of the country did not agree, and there was also no reply from leaders of Sudeten German organizations. Later, the German President Richard von Weizsäcker answered this by apologizing to Czechoslovakia during his visit to Prague in March 1990 after Václav Havel repeated his apology characterizing the expulsion as "the mistakes and sins of our fathers". However, the Beneš decrees continue to remain in force in Czechoslovakia.

In Czech–German relations, the topic has been effectively closed by the Czech–German declaration of 1997. One principle of the declaration was that parties will not burden their relations with political and legal issues which stem from the past.

However, some expelled Sudeten Germans or their descendants are demanding return of their former property, which was confiscated after the war. Several such cases have been taken to Czech courts. As confiscated estates usually have new inhabitants, some of whom have lived there for more than 50 years, attempts to return to a pre-war state may cause fear. The topic comes to life occasionally in Czech politics. Like in Poland, worries and restrictions concerning land purchases exist in the Czech Republic. According to a survey by the Allensbach Institut in November 2005, 38% of Czechs believe Germans want to regain territory they lost or will demand compensation.

=== German minority in Hungary ===
Today the German minority in Hungary have minority rights, organisations, schools and local councils but spontaneous assimilation is well under way. Many of the deportees visited their old homes after the fall of the Iron Curtain in 1990. In 2001, 62,105 people declared to be German and 88,209 people had affinity with cultural values, traditions of the German nationality.

=== German minority in Romania ===
Numerous Romanian Germans have emigrated to Germany, especially after 1989 and are represented by the Association of Transylvanian Saxons in Germany (German: Landsmannschaft der Siebenbürger Sachsen in Deutschland). Due to this emigration from Romania, the population of native Germans there has been dwindling constantly over the course of the previous decades (for example, in absolute figures: 359,109 in 1977 and then only 60,088 in 2002).

Furthermore, these Germans (i.e. the Transylvanian Saxons, Banat Swabians, Sathmar Swabians, Bukovina Germans, Transylvanian Landler, Zipser Germans, Regat Germans, and Dobrujan Germans) remaining in Romania are represented by the Democratic Forum of Germans in Romania (German: Demokratisches Forum der Deutschen in Rumänien).
