= Banat Swabian dialect =

German dialect from Banat, Romania

Banat Swabian
- Banat Schwäbisch
- Native to: Mostly Banat, Romania but also Bačka, Serbia (Note: Also spoken in Germany and Austria by a few hundred people.)
- Region: Banat, southwestern Romania (as well as Central-Southwestern Europe)
- Language family: Indo-European: Germanic; West Germanic; Elbe Germanic; High German; Central German; West Central German; Central Franconian; Moselle Franconian; Banat Swabian

Language codes
- ISO 639-3: –

Banat Swabian (German: Banatschwäbisch and also known as Donauschwäbisch) is a local German dialect spoken in Banat, present-day southwestern Romania by the Banat Swabians (German: Banater Schwaben), an ethnic German sub-group which is part of the larger German minority of Romania and a branch of the Danube Swabians respectively. In comparative linguistics, it is a West Central German dialect and it also has some features which correspond to Hessian dialects.

== Background ==
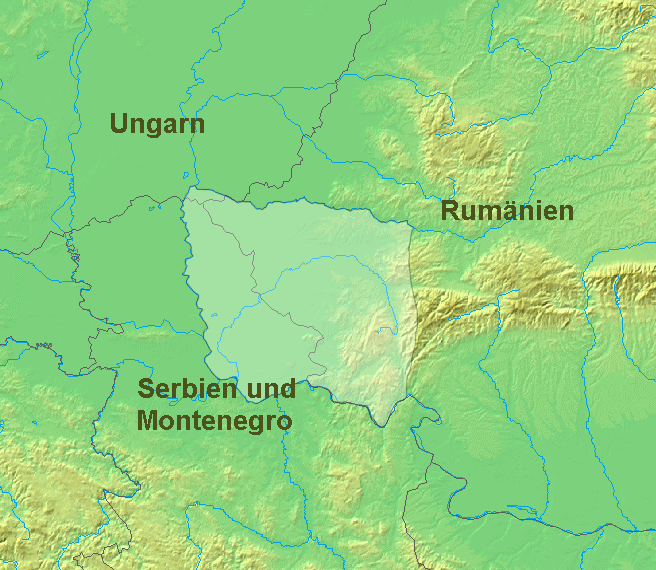
The location of Banat in southwestern Europe, situated between Romania, Hungary, and Serbia.

The Banat was largely depopulated during the centuries-long Ottoman wars. Following the liberation of the last Ottoman-occupied territory of the Kingdom of Hungary in the Austro-Turkish War of 1716–1718. The region was sparsely populated; to strengthen the borderlands, Queen Maria Theresa initiated a state-sponsored colonization program. Swabian colonists arrived in Banat in the 18th century; most of the initial Banat Swabian colonists were not from the historical German region of Swabia. They also came from other regions of present-day Germany and even from Luxembourg. Therefore, the dialect of the Banat Swabians is a West Central German dialect, which is part of the Moselle-Franconian family and thereby shares several linguistic similarities with another German dialect spoken in Romania, namely Transylvanian Saxon, as well as with Luxembourgish from which the latter is mainly descended. In addition, Banat Swabian is also closer to Palatine German (German: Pfälzisch) or other Rhenish Franconian dialects such as that spoken in Saarland (i.e., Saarländisch).

Hence, only Sathmar Swabian is an actual Alemannic German Swabian dialect, whereas Banat Swabian is closer to Palatine German. It also has words from Romanian and Serbian, being influenced by these two languages given the centuries-long cohabitation between the Germans and the Romanians and Serbians in Banat. It is locally known as Schwowisch in Bačka, Serbia.
