= Cămin =

Cămin Kálmánd
- Commune
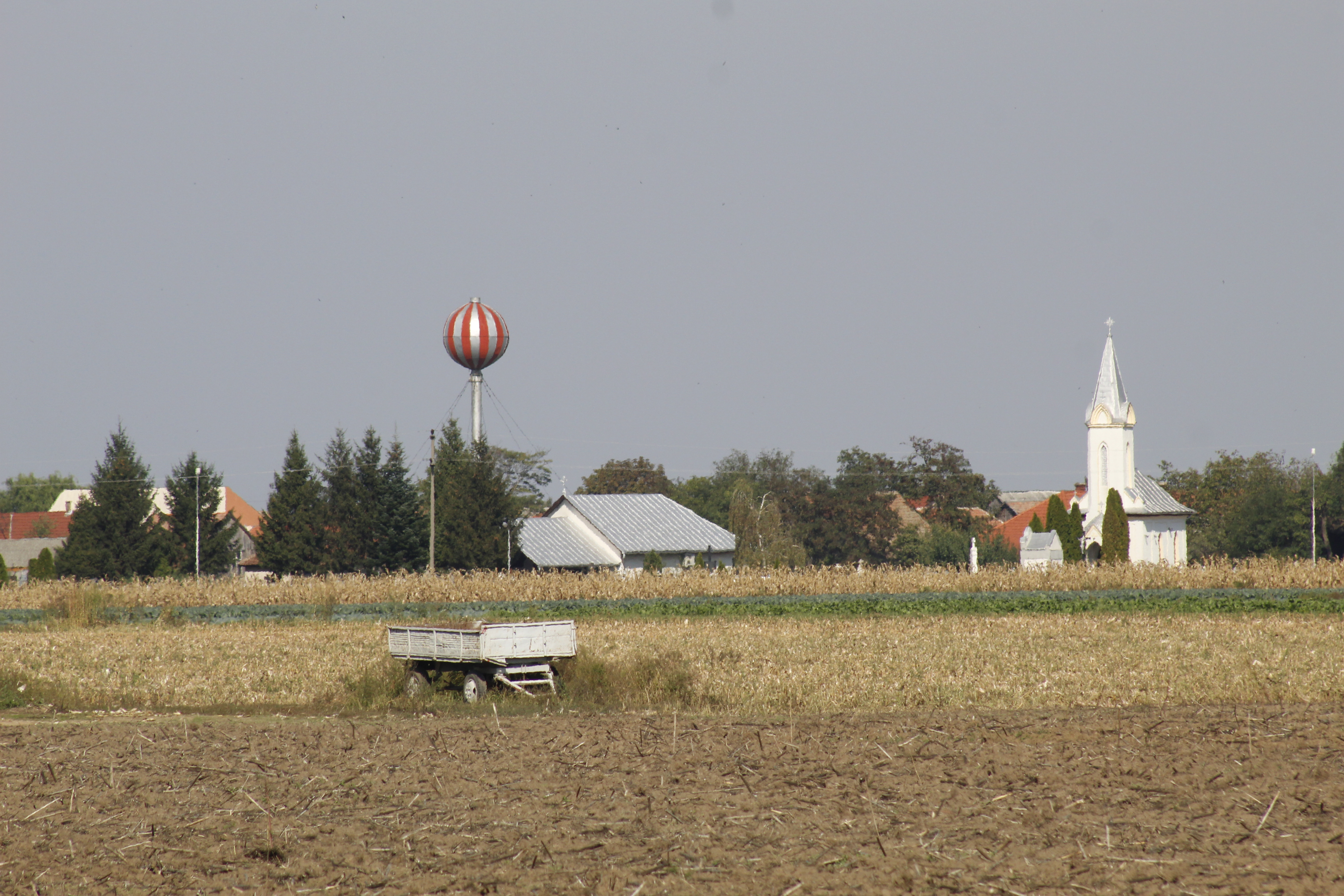
- View towards the cemetery

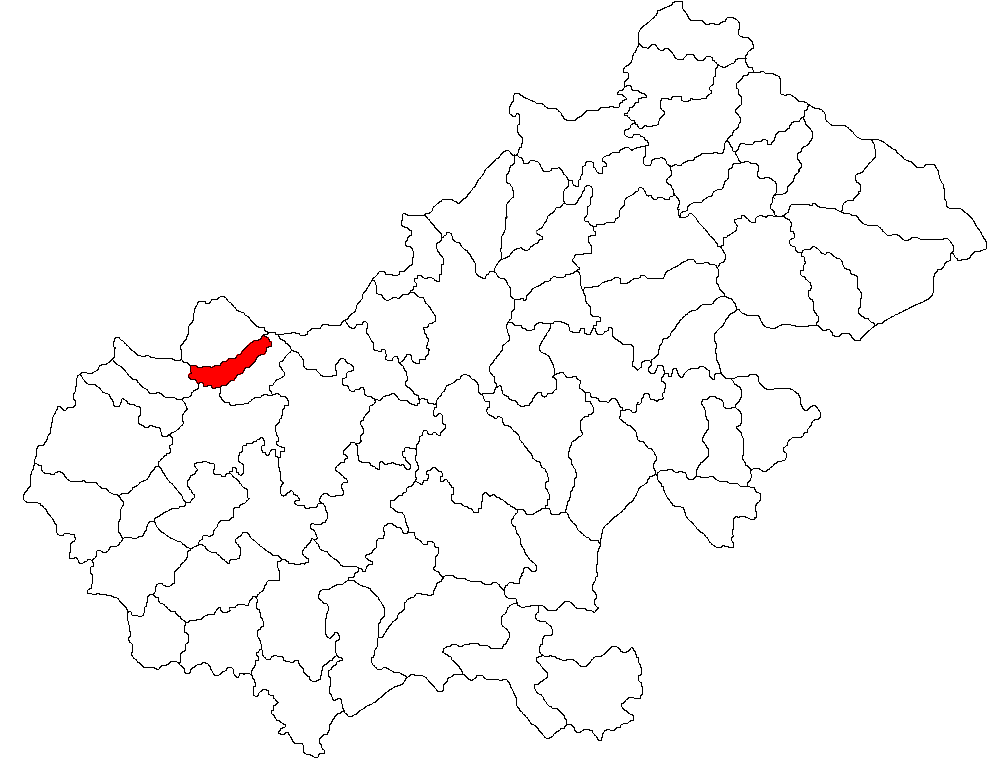
- Location in Satu Mare County

- Location in Romania
- Coordinates: 47°44′N 22°29′E
- Country: Romania
- County: Satu Mare

Government
  - Mayor (2024–2028): Imre Sütő (FDGR)
- Area: 48.03 km^{2} (18.54 sq mi)
- Elevation: 119 m (390 ft)
- Population (2021-12-01): 1,250
  - Density: 26.0/km^{2} (67.4/sq mi)
- Time zone: UTC+02:00 (EET)
  - Summer (DST): UTC+03:00 (EEST)
- Postal code: 447081
- Area code: (+40) 02 61
- Vehicle reg.: SM
- Website: primariacamin.ro

Cămin (Hungarian: Kálmánd, Hungarian pronunciation: [ˈkaːlmaːd]) is a commune located in Satu Mare County, Romania. It is composed of a single village, Cămin, part of Căpleni Commune until 2002, when it was split off.

The commune is located in the western part of the county, just north of the city of Carei and about 40 km (25 mi) west of the county seat, Satu Mare. Situated close to the Hungarian border, Cămin belongs to the Carei metropolitan area.

Historical population
Year	Pop.	±%
1880	740	—
1890	791	+6.9%
1900	890	+12.5%
1910	1,072	+20.4%
1920	1,228	+14.6%
1930	1,320	+7.5%
1941	1,438	+8.9%
1956	1,545	+7.4%
1966	1,627	+5.3%
1977	1,643	+1.0%
1992	1,445	−12.1%
2002	1,376	−4.8%
2011	1,388	+0.9%
2021	1,250	−9.9%
Source: Census data

At the 2011 census, the commune had 1,388 inhabitants; of those, 64.5% were Hungarians, 22.5% Germans, 7.2% Roma, and 5% Romanians. At the 2021 census, Cămin had a population of 1,250, of which 51.52% were Hungarians, 30.24% Germans, 8.32% Roma, and 6.56% Romanians.

== Administration ==
The current local council has the following political composition, based on the results of the votes cast at the 2024 Romanian local elections.

Party	Seats	Current Council
Democratic Forum of Germans in Romania (FDGR/DFDR)	5	
Democratic Alliance of Hungarians in Romania (UDMR/RMDSZ)	3	
National Liberal Party (PNL)	1	

== Natives ==
- János Scheffler (1887–1952), Roman Catholic prelate
