= Lutsch House =

- Romanian: Casa Lutsch German: (Das) Lutschhaus Hungarian: Lutsch-ház
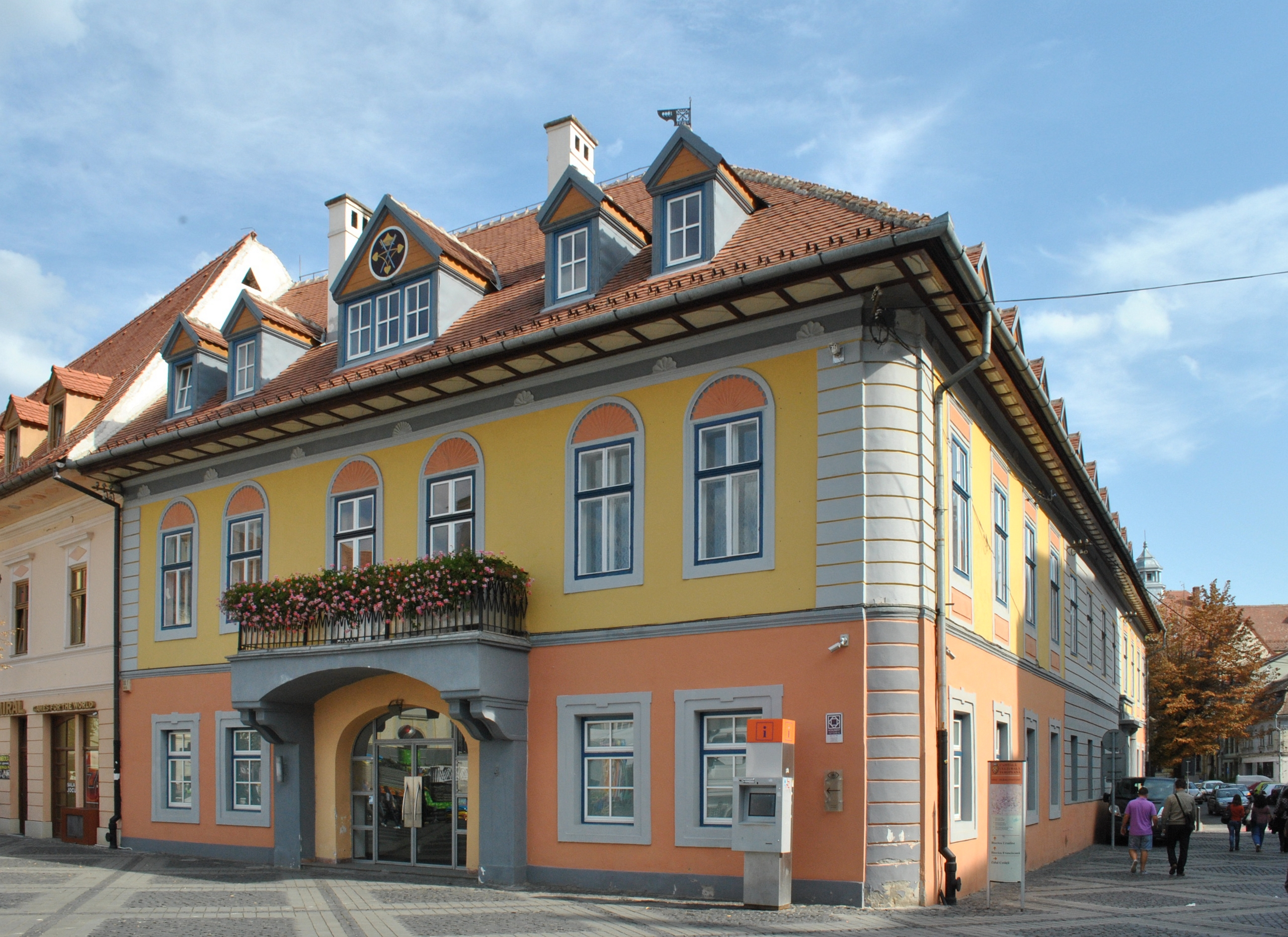

General information
- Architectural style: Baroque
- Location: Sibiu, Sibiu County, Piața Mare nr. 2, Sibiu, Romania
- Coordinates: 45°47′48.4″N 24°9′9.9″E
- Groundbreaking: 15th century, renovated 1830

The Lutsch House (Romanian: Casa Lutsch, German: (Das) Lutschhaus, Hungarian: Lutsch-ház) is a historic monument located in the Grand Square of Sibiu (German: Hermannstadt), Transylvania, Romania. It uses the code name 143469.91 in the National Archaeological Repertory of Romania.

The building hosts the headquarters of the Democratic Forum of Germans in Romania (FDGR/DFDR), as well as the headquarters of Democratic Alliance of Hungarians in Romania (UDMR/RMDSZ) in Sibiu.

== History ==
At the end of the 15th century, the house belonged to the Altemberger family, then between 1537–1593 to the Haller family. After 1593 it was in the possession of Johann Lutsch, after whom it was named. In 1661 the owner became Georg Reussner, his descendants donating the building to the city's property in 1821. Radical transformations took place in 1830, when the building received its current appearance.

== Architecture ==
The building has a rectangular plan, it has one floor and a basement. It has two facades facing the Great Square and General Magheru Street.

The house's current architecture is Baroque. Before renovation in 1830, the building also had Gothic features.

== Gallery ==
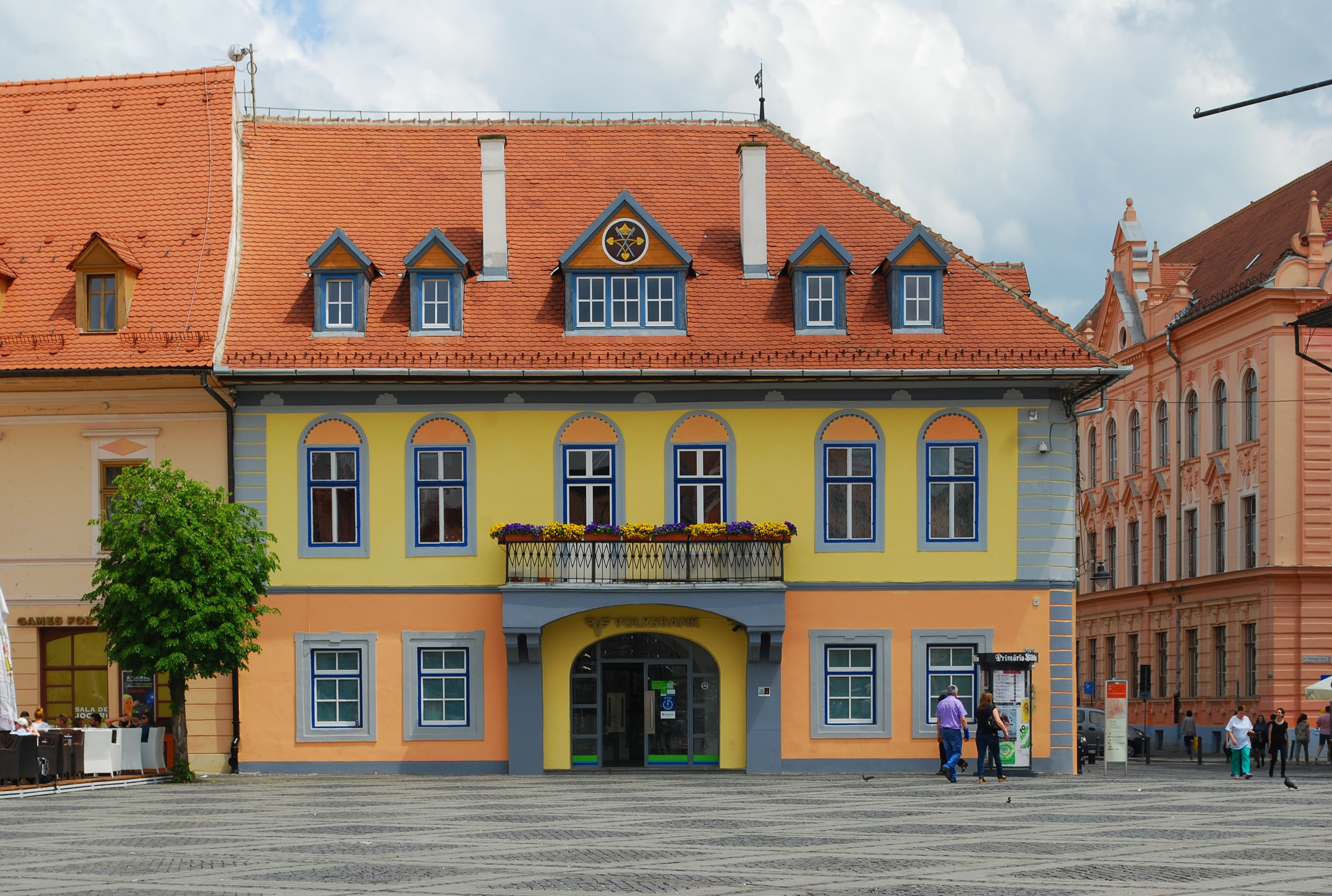
Lutsch House as seen from the Grand Square (Piața Mare)

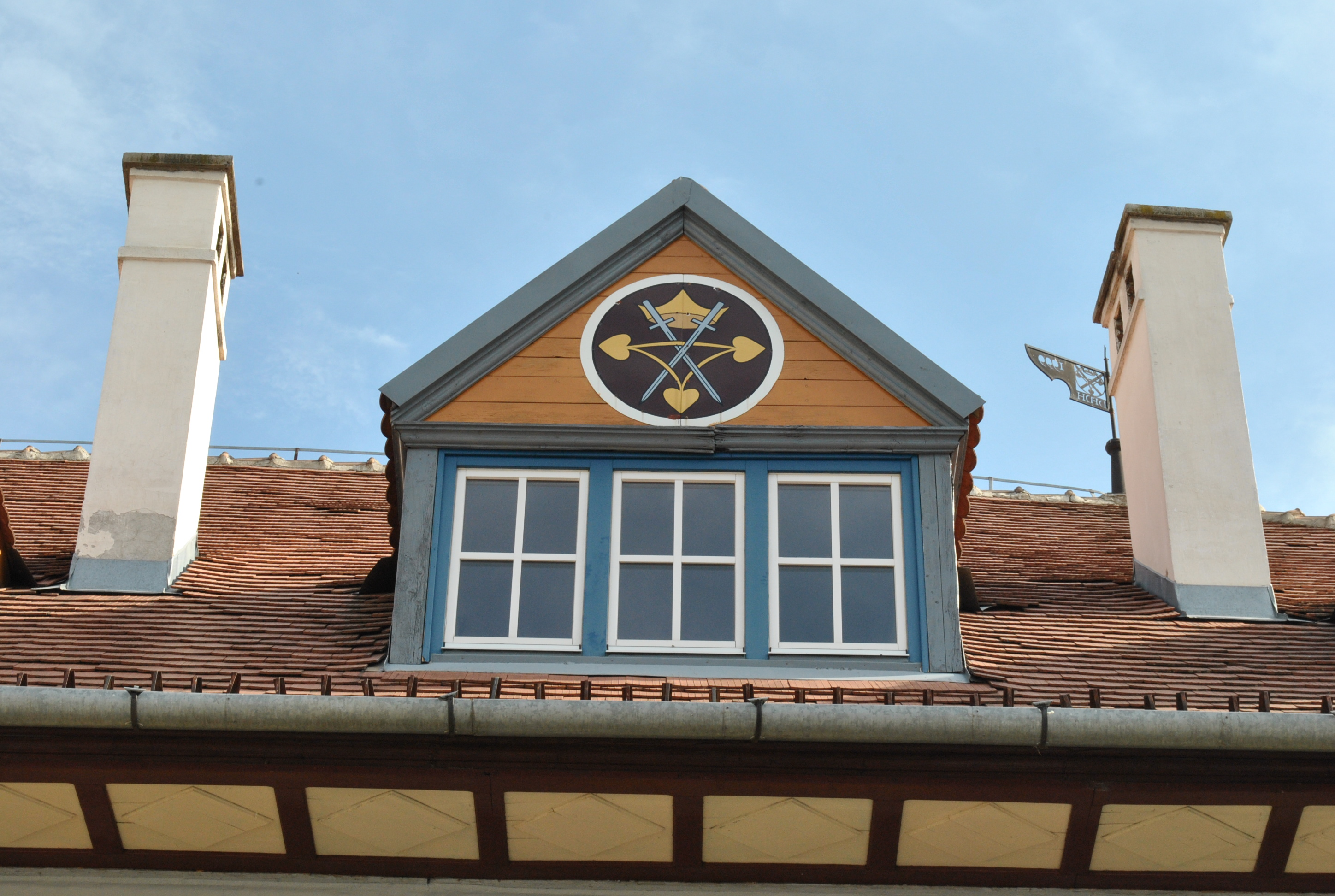
Coat of arms of Sibiu

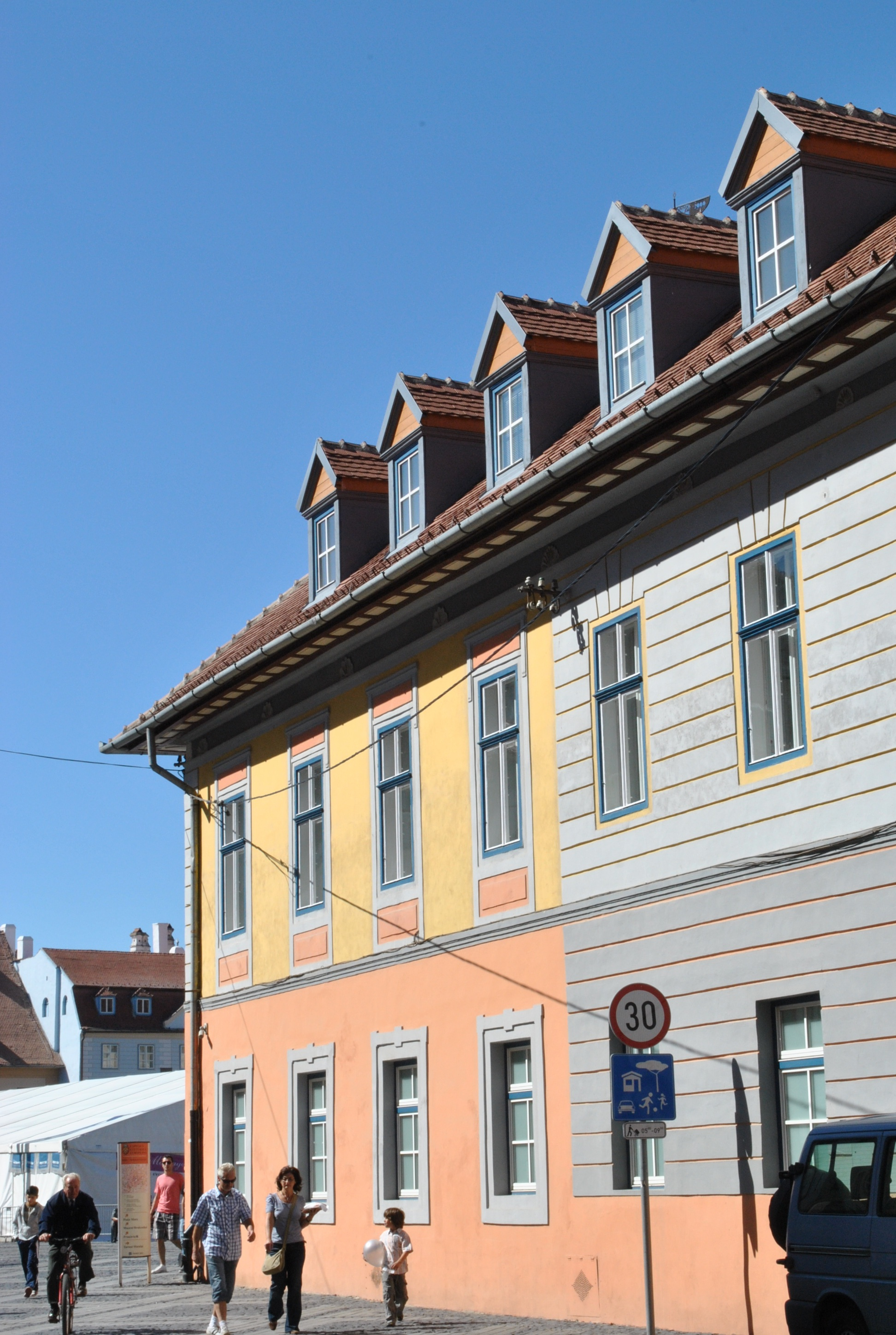
Side view

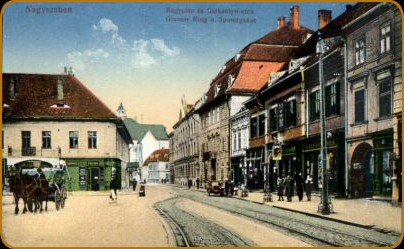
Painting showing the Lutsch House (left) before renovation. The building had Sibiu Eyes back then

== See also ==
- Eyes of Sibiu
