= Petrești, Satu Mare =

Petrești Mezőpetri, Petrifeld
- Commune
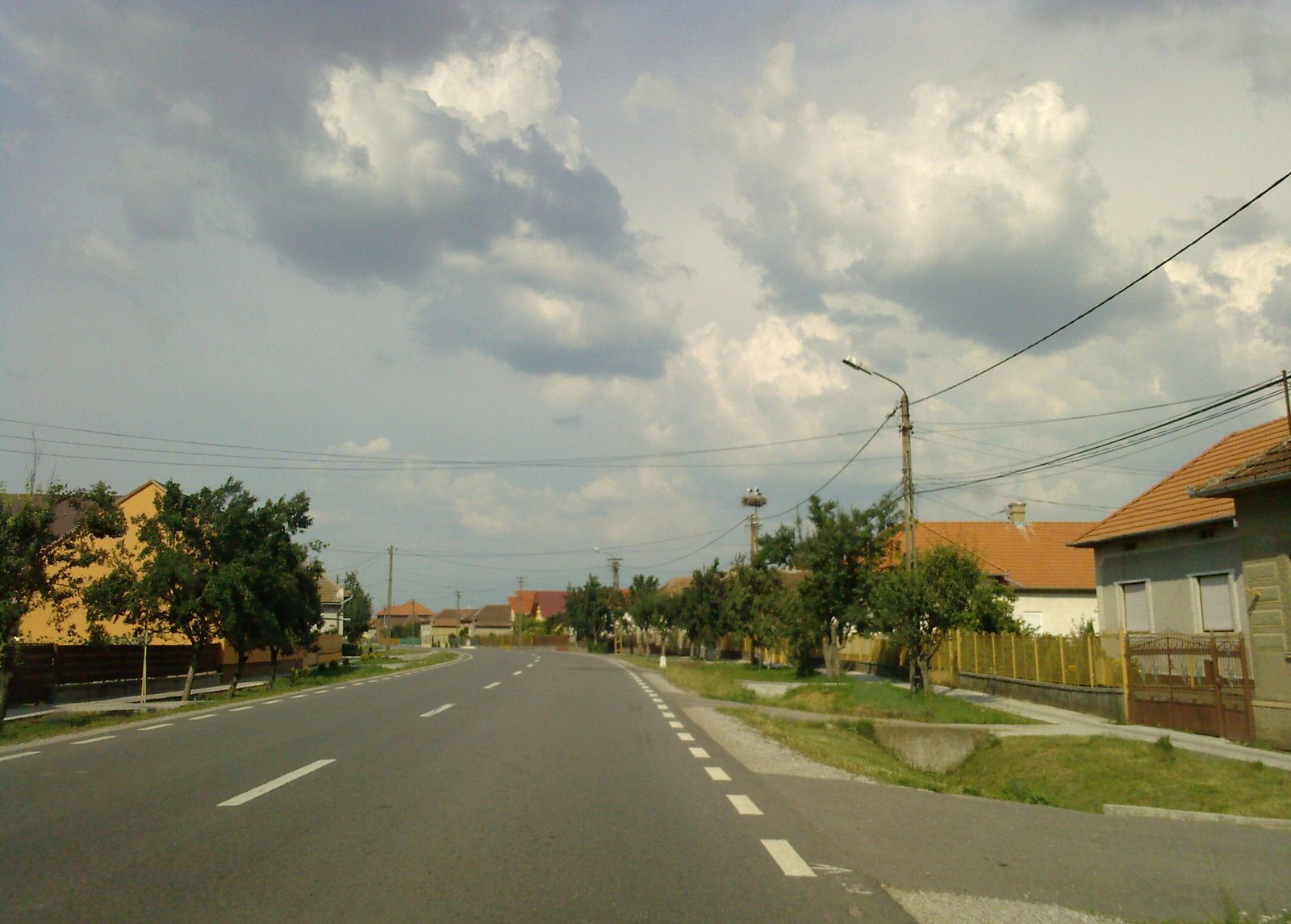
- Petrești village

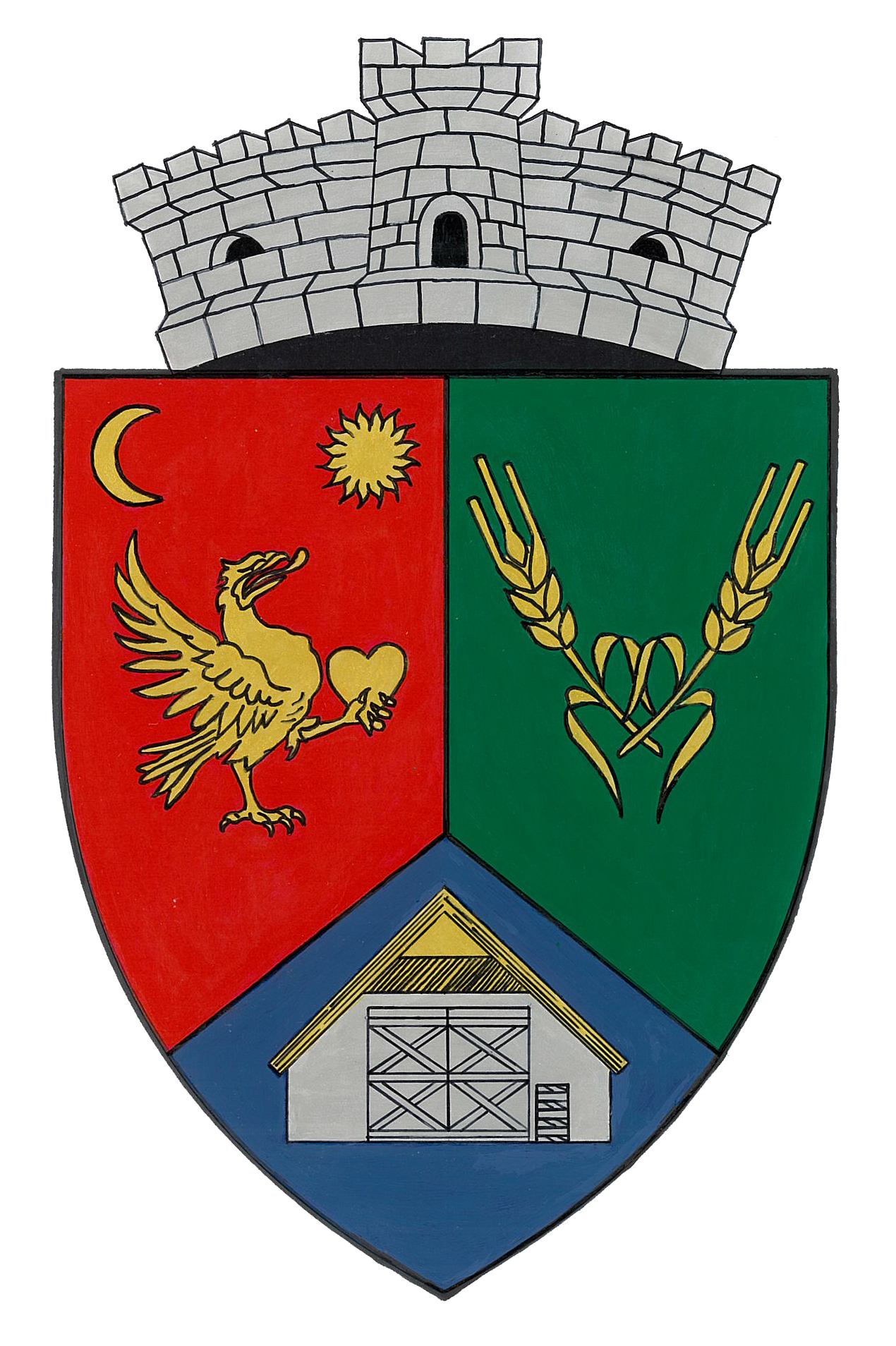
- Coat of arms

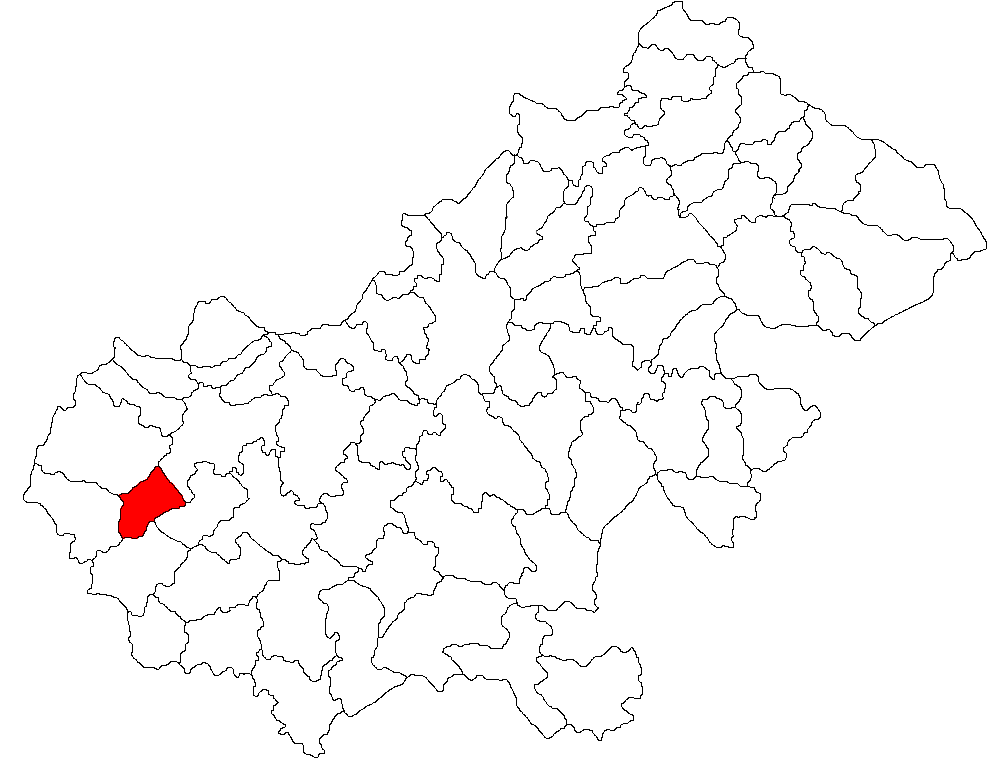
- Location in Satu Mare County

- Location in Romania
- Coordinates: 47.6042°N 22.3639°E
- Country: Romania
- County: Satu Mare

Government
  - Mayor (2024–2028): Gheorghe Otto Marchis (FDGR)
- Area: 29.45 km^{2} (11.37 sq mi)
- Elevation: 138 m (453 ft)
- Population (2021-12-01): 1,388
  - Density: 47.13/km^{2} (122.1/sq mi)
- Time zone: UTC+02:00 (EET)
  - Summer (DST): UTC+03:00 (EEST)
- Postal code: 447240
- Area code: (+40) 0261
- Vehicle reg.: SM
- Website: www.petresti-sm.ro

Petrești (German: Petrifeld; Hungarian: Mezőpetri, Hungarian pronunciation: [ˈmɛzøːpɛtri]) is a commune of 1,388 inhabitants in Satu Mare County, Romania. It is composed of two villages, Dindeștiu Mic (Kisdengeleg) and Petrești.

In 1740, Count Sándor Károlyi colonized the village with a German population. The Petrești Swabian Museum is a household typical of traditional Swabian architecture.

== Demographics ==
Historical population
Year	Pop.	±%
1880	1,168	—
1890	1,283	+9.8%
1900	1,409	+9.8%
1910	1,455	+3.3%
1920	1,518	+4.3%
1930	1,588	+4.6%
1941	1,801	+13.4%
1956	2,641	+46.6%
1966	2,848	+7.8%
1977	2,641	−7.3%
1992	1,929	−27.0%
2002	1,683	−12.8%
2011	1,588	−5.6%
2021	1,388	−12.6%
Source: Census data

At the 2002 census, the commune had a population of 1,683; of those, 794 (47.17%) were Hungarians, 530 (31.49%) Germans (Sathmar Swabians), 199 (11.82%) Romanians, and 159 (9.44%) Roma. According to mother tongue, 73% spoke Hungarian as their first language, while 14.31% spoke German and 12.65% of the population spoke Romanian. At the 2011 census, there were 1,588 inhabitants, of which 46.91% were Hungarians, 27.33% Germans, 12.53% Romanians, and 10.52% Roma. At the 2021 census Petrești had a population of 1,388; of those, 39.55% were Germans, 39.05% were Hungarians, 10.66% Romanians, and 5.19% Roma.

== Administration ==
The local council has the following political composition, based on the results of the votes cast at the 2024 Romanian local elections.

Party	Seats	Current Council
Democratic Forum of Germans in Romania (FDGR/DFDR)	11	
