= Sathmar Swabian =

Upper Swabian dialect of Satu Mare, Romania

- Schwǫbisch
- Region: Satu Mare
- Ethnicity: Satu Mare Swabians
- Native speakers: c. 200
- Language family: Indo-European: Germanic; West Germanic; Elbe Germanic; High German; Upper German; Alemannic; Swabian; Sathmar Swabian
- Writing system: German alphabet

Language codes
- ISO 639-3: –
- IETF: swg-u-sd-rosm

Sathmar Swabian (endonym: Schwǫbisch, Romanian: Șvabă sătmăreană or dialectul șvăbesc sătmărean, Hungarian: szatmári sváb) is an Upper Swabian dialect of High German spoken in Romania in Satu Mare (German: Sathmar) and Satu Mare County, north-western Transylvania by the Sathmar Swabians (German: Sathmarer Schwaben), who are among the few Danube Swabians who are in fact truly Swabian in origin. Many speakers now live in Germany but some remain in northwestern Transylvania, Romania, more specifically in Satu Mare County (German: Kreis Sathmar).

== Sample words ==
Sathmar Swabian	Swabian in Germany	Standard German	English
i	i, e	ich	I
du	du	du	you (singular)
mir, mr		wir	we
dees	des	dies	this
daß	daß	dass	that (conjunction)
wear		wer	we
wa, waa		was	what
it (itt, itte)	ed, it, ita	nicht	not
alles	älles, (alles)	alles	everything (all)
vie		viel	many
