= Democratic Forum of Germans in Romania =

Democratic Forum of Germans in Romania Forumul Democrat al Germanilor din România Demokratisches Forum der Deutschen in Rumänien
- President: Paul-Jürgen Porr
- Leader in the Chamber of Deputies: Ovidiu Victor Ganț
- Managing director (Note: (German: Geschäftsführer)): Benjamin Józsa
- Founded: 28 December 1989 in Sighișoara/Schäßburg
- Headquarters: Sibiu, Sibiu County, Transylvania, Romania
- Membership: c. 40,000 (2004) c. 20,000 (Note: A more recent figure)
- Ideology: German minority interests Christian democracy Conservative liberalism
- Political position: Centre-right
- National affiliation: National Minorities Parliamentary Group
- Regional affiliation: United for Brașov Alliance (2024)
- European Parliament group: EPP-ED (January – November 2007)
- International affiliation: Federal Union of European Nationalities
- Colours: Red-burgundy
- Senate: 0 / 136
- Chamber of Deputies: 1 / 330
- European Parliament: 0 / 33
- Mayors: 5 / 3,176
- County Councillors: 5 / 1,338
- Local Council Councillors: 53 / 39,855

Website
- www.fdgr.ro

The Democratic Forum of Germans in Romania (German: Demokratisches Forum der Deutschen in Rumänien, DFDR; Romanian: Forumul Democrat al Germanilor din România, FDGR; in short Forumul German or Das Forum) is a political party (legally recognized as an association of public utility according to the governmental decision HG 599 as per 4 June 2008) organised on ethnic criteria representing the interests of the German minority in Romania.

Initially, the FDGR/DFDR was a cultural association representing the culture of the German community in Romania, but it subsequently became a moderately successful local political party (especially amongst Romanian voters as well), most notably in parts of Transylvania (central Romania) and Banat (south-western Romania). Consequently, the counties where the FDGR/DFDR obtained the highest political scores in many local elections after 1989 are Sibiu (German: Kreis Hermannstadt) and Timiș (German: Kreis Temesch) respectively.

== History (1989–present) ==
The forum was founded at the end of 1989, in the wake of the Romanian Revolution which culminated with the downfall of Nicolae Ceaușescu's dictatorship. Despite originally being a German minority party (and, initially, a cultural organization), it gradually grew quite popular amongst many ethnic Romanians, especially in parts of Transylvania and Banat, including, most notably, the major town of Sibiu (German: Hermannstadt), where the party still holds a majority in the local town council (12 out of 23 seats), as well as in the County of Sibiu. Aside from its significant presence in Transylvania and Banat, the FDGR/DFDR is also active in Bukovina (i.e. Suceava County), yet without any elected representatives in the local politics, acting instead in the manner of a cultural foundation which periodically organizes a wide range of educational and cultural events.

In terms of reputation, the party is regarded as independent, whilst its politicians, including former Sibiu mayor, former party leader, and former President of Romania, Klaus Johannis, have earned respect as thorough administrators. The FDGR/DFDR has often cooperated with the National Liberals (PNL), to which Iohannis became a member and one of its prime leaders (as vice-president) starting from February 2013. Additionally, the FDGR/DFDR also has a youth wing known as the German Youth Federation in Romania (German: Jugendforum), currently headed by Adelheid Simon.

At local administration level, most notably in Timișoara (German: Temeswar or Temeschburg) or Baia Mare (German: Frauenbach or Neustadt), the FDGR/DFDR has also co-operated with another Romanian centre-right historical party, namely the PNȚCD. For the 2020 Romanian local elections however, the FDGR/DFDR supported Dominic Fritz (the candidate of the USR PLUS, now USR) for the seat of mayor of Timișoara which the latter also won in the first round with 53.24% over former national liberal (PNL) mayor Nicolae Robu.

In recent years, the main headquarters of FDGR/DFDR in Sibiu (German: Hermannstadt) organised several foreign receptions of high ranking German officials, among which most notably there were former Christian Democratic Union of Germany (CDU) leader and former chancellor Angela Merkel and president Joachim Gauck.

== Overview and organization ==
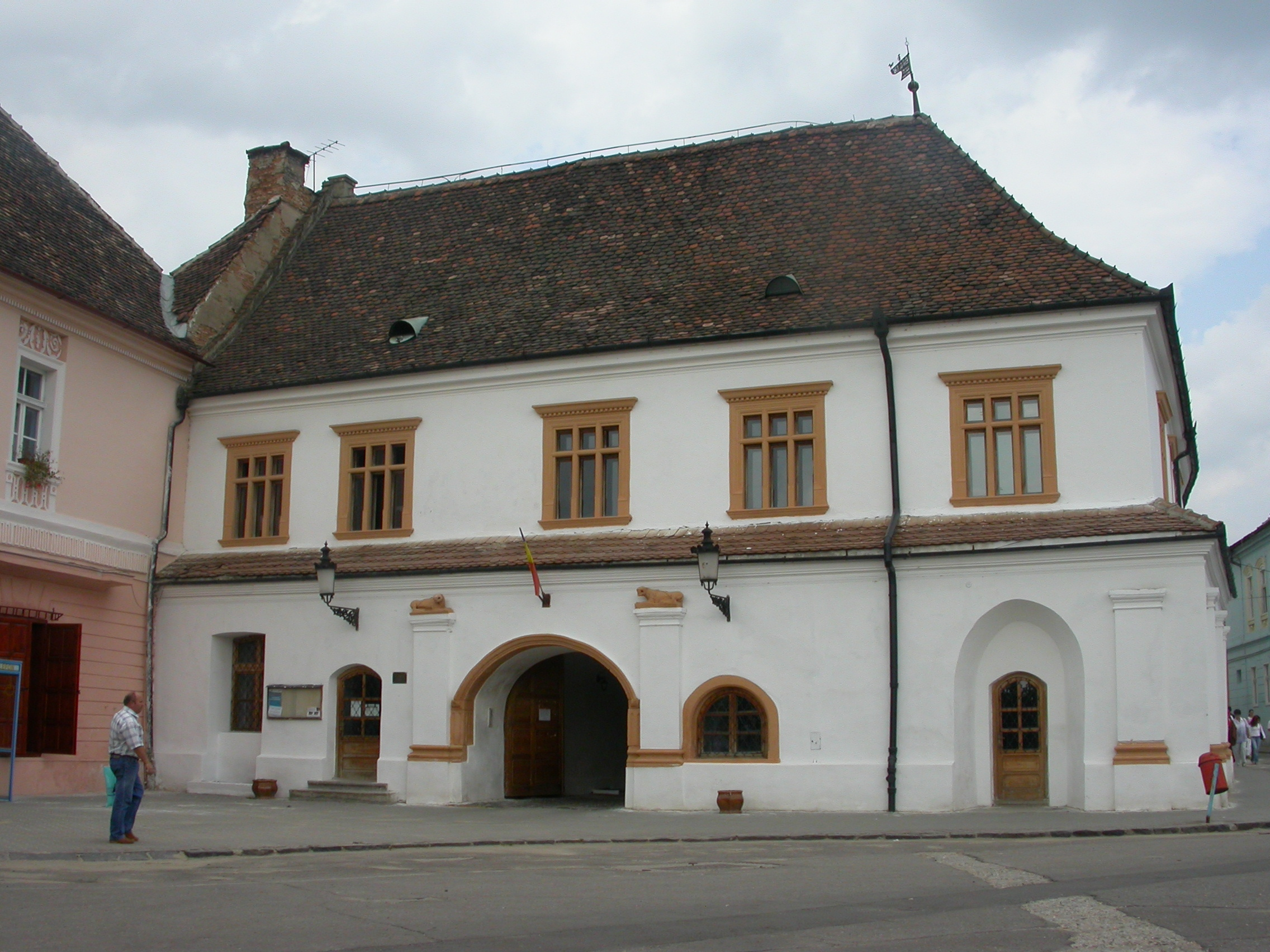
The Schuller house, the seat of the FDGR/DFDR in Mediaș (German: Mediasch, Transylvanian Saxon: Medwesch), Sibiu County.

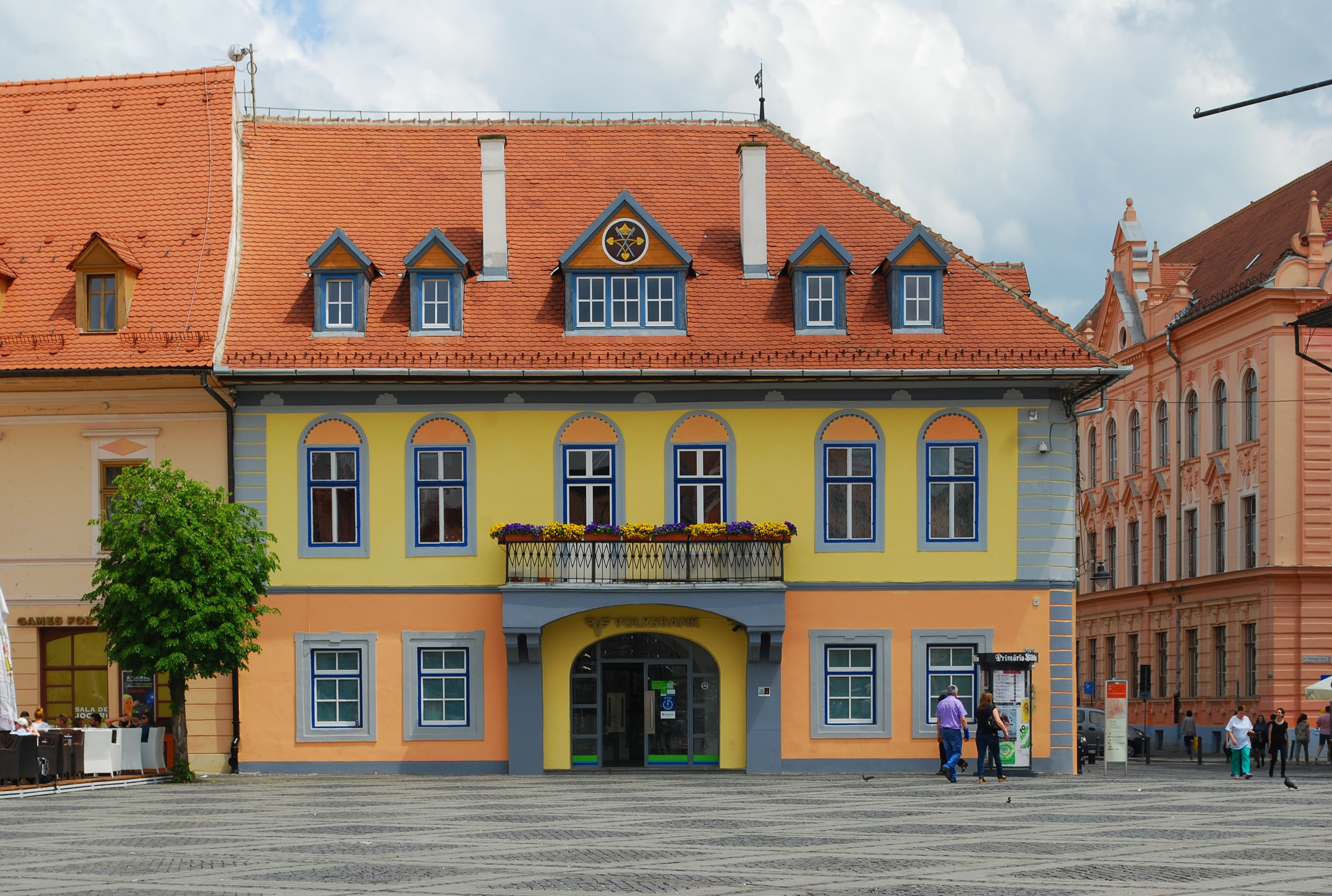
The Lutsch House, the seat of the FDGR/DFDR in Sibiu (German: Hermannstadt, Transylvanian Saxon: Härmeschtat).

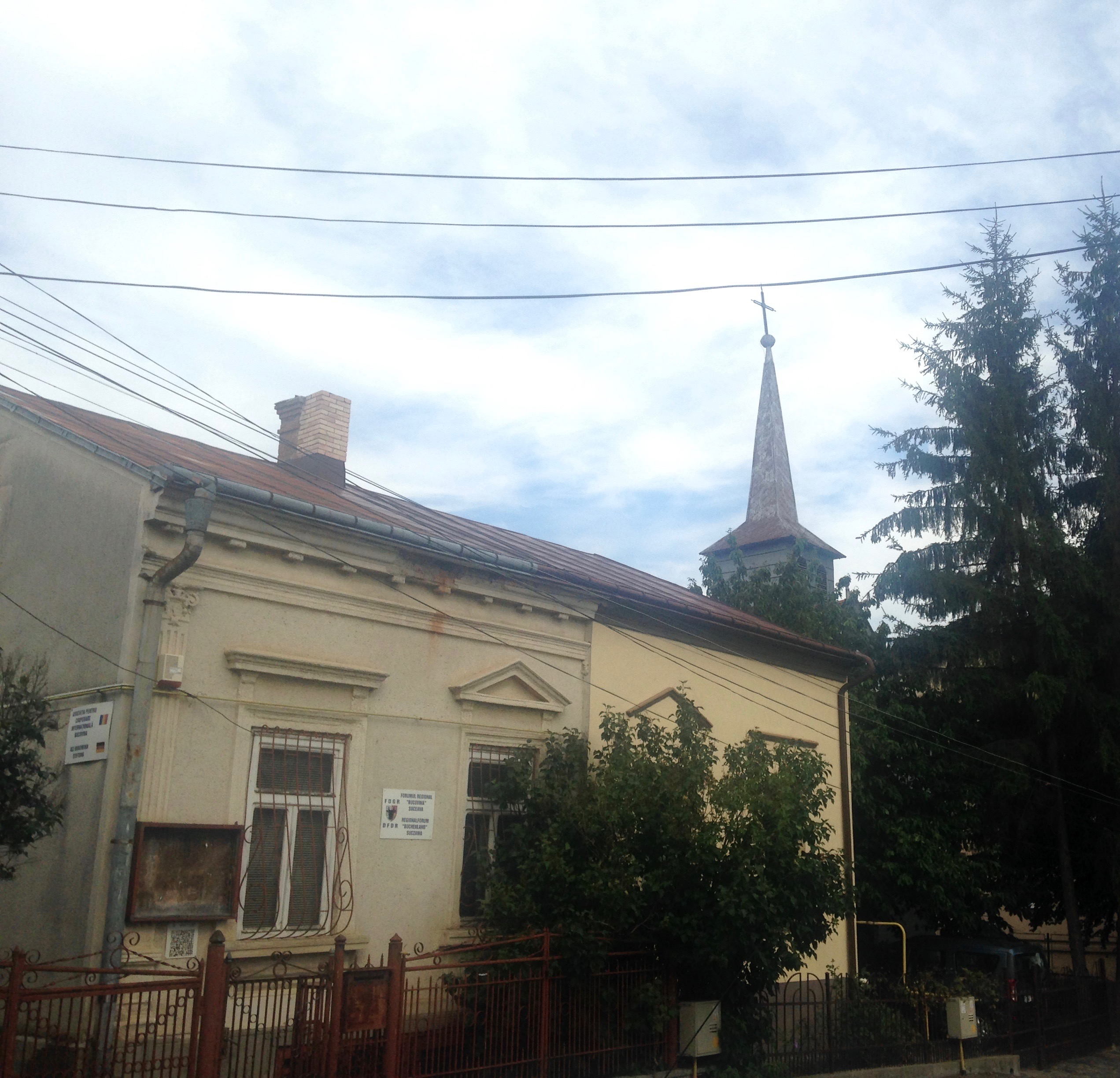
The local headquarters of FDGR/DFDR in Suceava (German: Suczawa), Bukovina in August 2020.

The history of the German minority in Romania, and mostly, their presence in the historical region of Transylvania, spans approximately a millennium back in time. Nevertheless, under the blanket term "Romanian Germans" (German: Rumäniendeutsche) a wide variety of different regional German-speaking groups are included (some which are native to other regions of Romania) as follows:

- Transylvanian Saxons (the eldest ethnic German sub-group on the territory of present-day Romania);
- Banat Swabians (including Banat Highland Germans);
- Sathmar Swabians;
- Bukovina Germans;
- Transylvanian Landler; (Note: Can be somewhat considered as part of the Transylvanian Saxon community, at least in religious terms, being also Evangelical Lutheran.)
- Zipser Germans; (Note: Native to both Maramureș and Bucovina, a sub-group of the Carpathian Germans (German: Karpatendeutsche or Mantaken))
- Regat Germans; (Note: The term Regat refers to the territorial extent of the Old Romanian Kingdom and, respectively, of the Kingdom of Romania before World War I.)
- Dobrujan Germans;
- Bessarabia Germans (former Romanian citizens between 1918 and 1940).

Since 2000, the FDGR/DFDR has won offices on both local and regional levels. In Sibiu (German: Hermannstadt), the FDGR/DFDR's Klaus Johannis has held the office of mayor from 2000 to 2014. In 2004, the forum gained 60.43% of votes in local elections for the Municipal Council. In addition, the FDGR/DFDR held 12 out of 23 seats in the Sibiu Municipal Council, forming an absolute majority alongside the PNL.

Following the 2016 local elections in Sibiu County (which has a population of about 450,000 residents), the FDGR/DFDR won 8 out of 33 seats in the County Council, where it is the third strongest political faction, after the National Liberals (PNL) and Social Democrats (PSD).

The FDGR/DFDR has also had mayors in office since 2004 in the cities of Mediaș (German: Mediasch) and Cisnădie (German: Heltau), as well as in a few villages in Satu Mare (German: Sathmar) county. The FDGR/DFDR is an associated member of the Federal Union of European Nationalities and was formerly affiliated with the European People's Party (German: Europäische Volkspartei).

Additionally, at local political level, the FDGR/DFDR is organized in five distinct branches as follows: FDGR Banat (German: DFDR Banat), FDGR Bucovina (German: DFDR Buchenland), FDGR Transilvania (German: DFDR Siebenbürgen), FDGR Transilvania de Nord (German: DFDR Nordsiebenbürgen), and FDGR Regiunea Extra-carpatică (German: DFDR Altreich).

== Controversies ==
Both during and after the 2014 presidential campaign of former FDGR/DFDR president Klaus Johannis, who subsequently became president of the National Liberal Party (PNL) during the autumn of the same year, the Social Democratic Party (PSD) accused the forum of being the legal continuator of the German Ethnic Group (Romanian: Grupul Etnic German din România) concerning alleged dubious retrocessions of several buildings from Sibiu (German: Hermannstadt) by Johannis during his terms as mayor to the forum itself. While the German Ethnic group was indeed a fascist organisation during World War II which represented the German minority in Romania between 1940 and 1944, the FDGR/DFDR is a distinct platform which has nothing to do with the latter, formed after 1989 anti-communist revolution and consequently not inheriting anything from it.

== Presidents ==
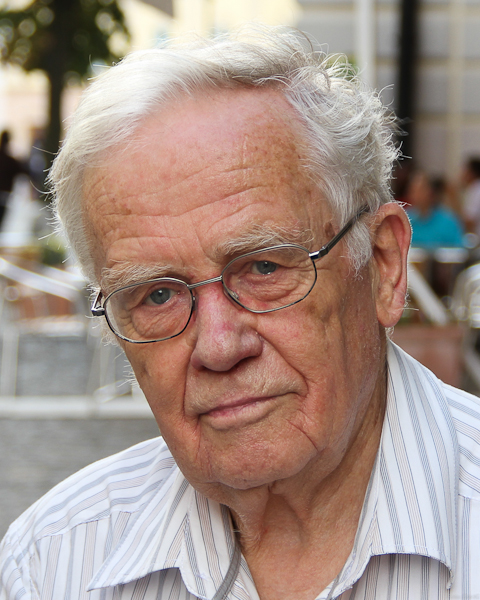
Paul Philippi, former FDGR/DFDR president between 1992 and 1998.

- 1990–1992: Thomas Nägler; (Note: Renowned Transylvanian Saxon academic/professor doctor, archaeologist, and historian)
- 1992–1998: Paul Philippi; (Note: Also subsequently served as Honorary president of the FDGR/DFDR)
- 1998–2001: Eberhard Wolfgang Wittstock;
- 2001–2013: Klaus Werner Johannis;
- 2013–present: Paul-Jürgen Porr.

== Chronology of FDGR/DFDR deputies ==
- 1990–1992: Ingmar Brandsch;
- 1992–1996: Eberhard Wolfgang Wittstock;
- 1996–1997: Werner Horst Brück;
- 1997–2004: Eberhard Wolfgang Wittstock;
- 2004–present: Ovidiu Victor Ganț.

== Localities with FDGR/DFDR mayors ==
=== 2016 Romanian local elections ===
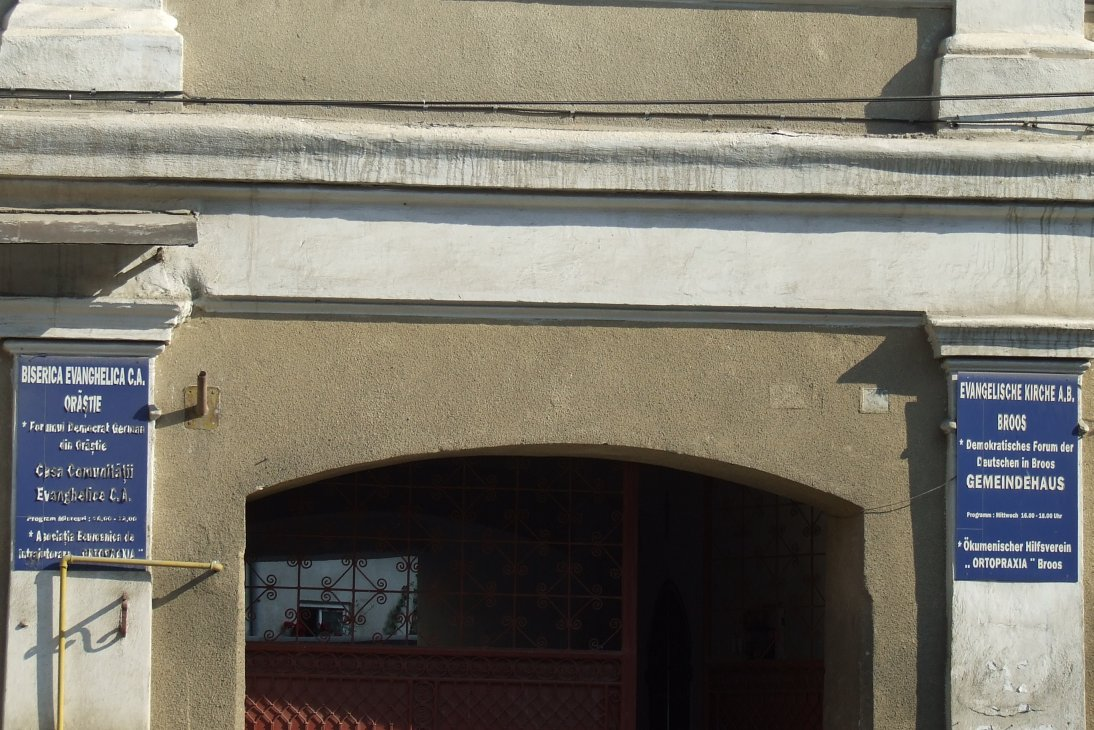
FDGR/DFDR headquarters in Orăștie (German: Broos) situated in Hunedoara County.

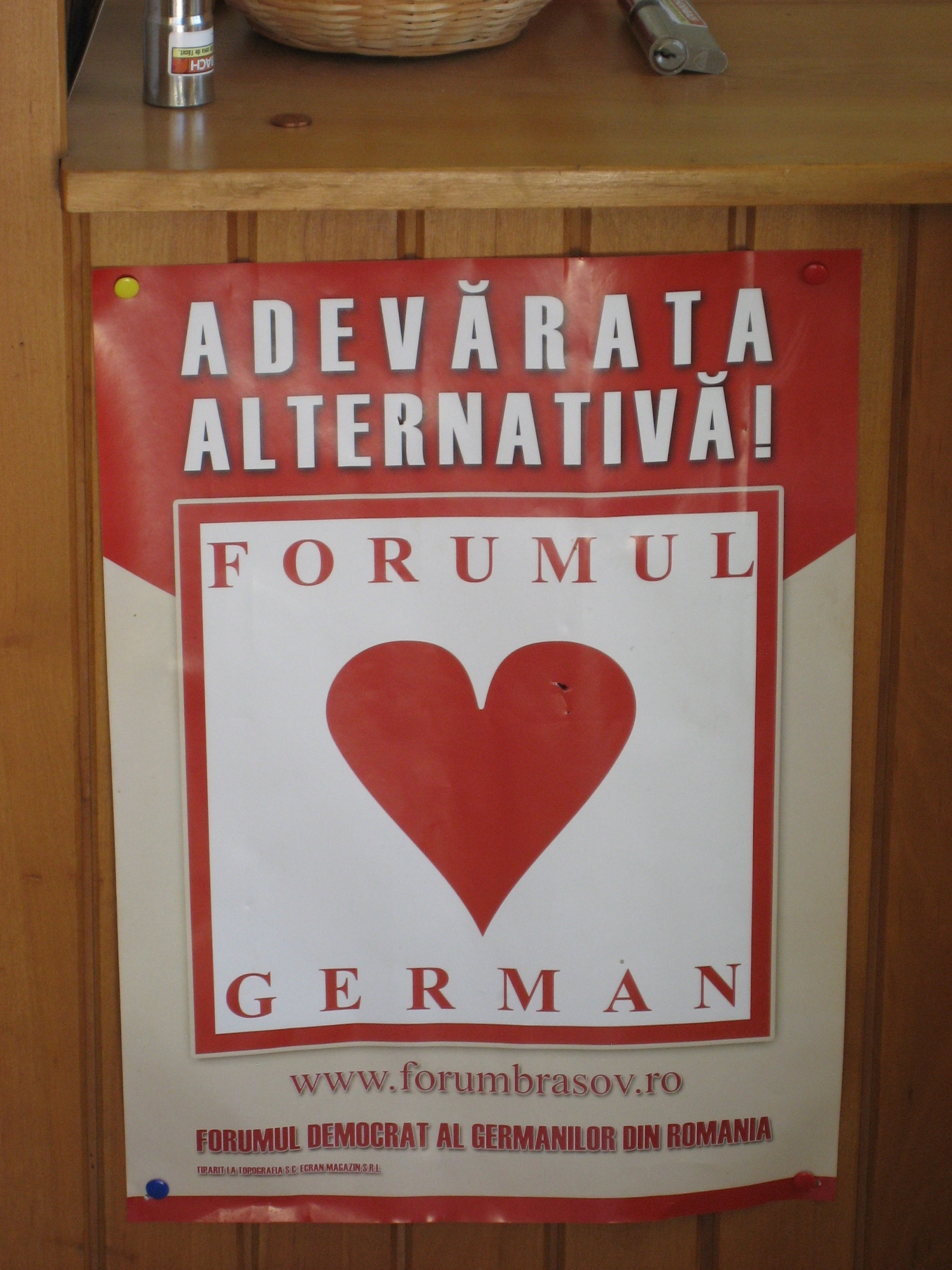
FDGR/DFDR electoral poster in Brașov (German: Kronstadt, Transylvanian Saxon: Kruhnen)

After the 2016 Romanian local elections, the FDGR/DFDR candidates won the following localities (most of them belonging to Satu Mare County):

- Cămin (German: Kalmandi), Imre Sütő;
- Sanislău (German: Stanislau), Ioan-Zoltan Kardosi;
- Turulung (German: Turterebesch), Gheorghe-Nicolae Gyákon;
- Petreşti (German: Petrifeld), Iosif Mellau;
- Sibiu (German: Hermannstadt), Astrid Fodor.

Furthermore, the FDGR/DFDR also held 91 local councillor seats in 32 communes.

=== 2020 Romanian local elections ===
After the 2020 Romanian local elections, the FDGR/DFDR candidates won the following localities (most of them belonging to Satu Mare County):

- Cămin (German: Kalmandi), Imre Sütő;
- Sanislău (German: Stanislau), Ioan-Zoltan Kardosi;
- Turulung (German: Turterebesch), Gheorghe-Nicolae Gyákon;
- Petreşti (German: Petrifeld), Gheorghe Otto Marchis;
- Sibiu (German: Hermannstadt), Astrid Fodor.

In addition, the party now holds 68 local council seats (39 in Satu Mare, 13 in Sibiu, 10 in Brașov, 4 in Timiș, 1 in Maramureș, and 1 in Arad) as well as 5 county council seats in Sibiu County.

=== 2024 Romanian local elections ===
After the 2024 Romanian local elections, the FDGR/DFDR candidates won the following localities (most of them belonging to Satu Mare County):

- Cămin (German: Kalmandi), Imre Sütő;
- Sanislău (German: Stanislau), Stefan Krémer;
- Turulung (German: Turterebesch), Gheorghe-Nicolae Gyákon;
- Petreşti (German: Petrifeld), Gheorghe Otto Marchis;
- Sibiu (German: Hermannstadt), Astrid Fodor.

In addition, the party now holds 53 local council seats (40 in Satu Mare, 9 in Sibiu, 2 in Timiș and 2 in Brașov) as well as 5 county council seats in Sibiu County.

== Notable FDGR/DFDR politicians ==
- Astrid Fodor, the current mayor of Sibiu (German: Hermannstadt)
- Wilhelm Fabini, sculptor and artist
- Martin Bottesch, former president of the Sibiu County Council
- Ovidiu Victor Ganț, member of Parliament and MEP for Romania (2007–09)
- Daniel Thellmann, former mayor of Mediaș (German: Mediasch) and founding member of DFDR/FDGR
- Klaus Iohannis, 5th President of Romania
- Paul Philippi, theologian and president of FDGR/DFDR
- Eberhard Wolfgang Wittstock, journalist and former FDGR/DFDR Member of Parliament
- Arnold Günter Klingeis, former mayor of Avrig (German: Freck)

== Electoral performance ==
=== Local elections ===
National results for the County Councils (CJ)
Year	National			Sibiu			Brașov			Timiș			Arad			Caraș-Severin		
Year	Votes	%	Seats	Votes	%	Seats	Votes	%	Seats	Votes	%	Seats	Votes	%	Seats	Votes	%	Seats
1996	18,568	0.22	4 / 1,642	5,772	3.19	1 / 39	1,927	0.74	0 / 41	2,811	1.02	1 / 45	4,710	2.44	1 / 39	2,084	1.5	1 / 39
2000	21,881	0.26	4 / 1,718	14,915	9.09	4 / 39	1,501	0.69	0 / 41	2,991	1.25	0 / 45	1,774	1.1	0 / 39	0	0	0 / 39
2004	76,843	0.85	11 / 1,436	56,877	28.39	11 / 33	5,042	2.08	0 / 35	5,514	2.1	0 / 37	4,255	2.18	0 / 33	0	0	0 / 31
2008	46,872	0.56	9 / 1,393	40,902	24.58	9 / 32	2,912	1.33	0 / 34	0	0	0 / 36	1,621	0.86	0 / 32	0	0	0 / 30
2012	62,528	0.64	11 / 1,393	47,083	24.7	9 / 32	13,377	5.04	2 / 34	0	0	0 / 36	2,068	0.98	0 / 32	0	0	0 / 30
2016	42,652	0.51	10 / 1,436	30,754	19.41	8 / 33	11,898	5.51	2 / 35	0	0	0 / 37	0	0	0 / 33	0	0	0 / 31
2020	24,333	0.31	5 / 1,340	19,903	12.94	5 / 32	4,430	2.19	0 / 34	0	0	0 / 36	0	0	0 / 32	0	0	0 / 30
2024	23.053	0.27	5 / 1,340	23,053	13.15	5 / 32	0	0	0 / 34	0	0	0 / 36	0	0	0 / 32	0	0	0 / 30

=== Legislative elections ===
Election	Chamber			Senate		
Election	Votes	%	Seats	Votes	%	Seats
1990	38,768	0.28	1 / 396	19,105	0.14	0 / 119
1992	34,685	0.32	1 / 341	588	0.00	0 / 143
1996	23,888	0.20	1 / 343	—N/a	—N/a	—N/a
2000	40,844	0.31	1 / 345	—N/a	—N/a	—N/a
2004	36,166	0.35	1 / 332	—N/a	—N/a	—N/a
2008	23,190	0.30	1 / 334	—N/a	—N/a	—N/a
2012	39,175	0.53	1 / 412	—N/a	—N/a	—N/a
2016	12,375	0.18	1 / 329	—N/a	—N/a	—N/a
2020	7,582	0.13	1 / 330	—N/a	—N/a	—N/a
2024	8,577	0.09	1 / 330	—N/a	—N/a	—N/a

=== Presidential elections ===
Election	Candidate	First round			Second round		
Election	Candidate	Votes	Percentage	Position	Votes	Percentage	Position
2014	Klaus Iohannis^{1}	2,881,406	30.3%	2nd	6,288,769	54.4%	1st
2019	Klaus Iohannis^{2}	3,485,292	37.8%	1st	6,509,135	66.1%	1st
2024	Elena Lasconi^{3}	1,772,500	19.18%	2nd	Election annulled		
2025	Crin Antonescu^{4}	1,892,930	20.07%	3rd	Not qualified.		

Notes:

^{1} Klaus Iohannis was still a member of the FDGR/DFDR and he was the common centre-right candidate that was endorsed in 2014 by the Christian Liberal Alliance (ACL).
^{2} Klaus Iohannis was endorsed by FDGR/DFDR and PNL.
^{3} Initially for the first round, the political stance of the FDGR/DFDR was against extremists, then for Elena Lasconi in the subsequent second round which did not ultimately take place because the respective election was annulled.
^{4} Crin Antonescu was announced as common PSD, PNL, UDMR/RMDSZ and the parties of ethnic minorities' candidate.

== See also ==
- Romanian ethnic minority parties
