= Kulturbund (Yugoslavia) =

Yugoslavian political organization

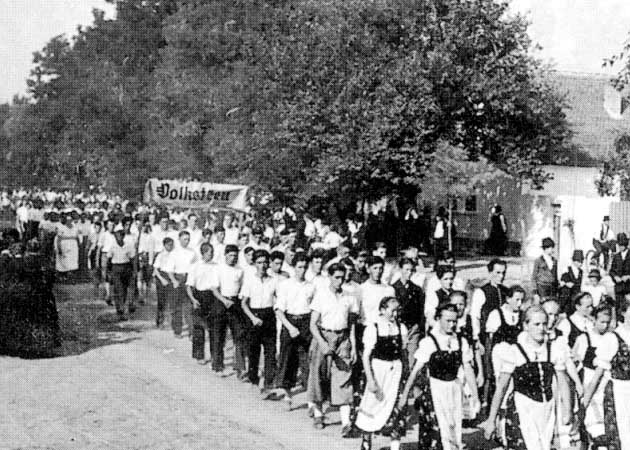
1938 parade organized by Kulturbund in Filipowa (modern-day Bački Gračac).

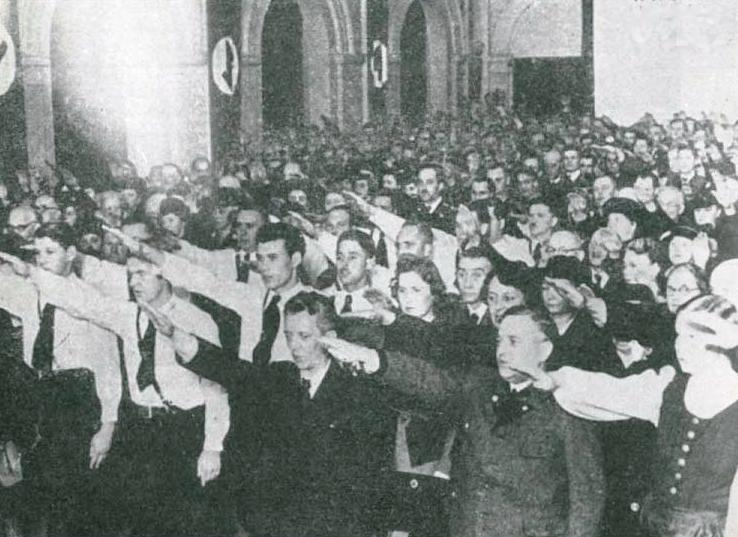
January 1941 Kulturbund rally in Celje, which was annexed by Germany later that year.

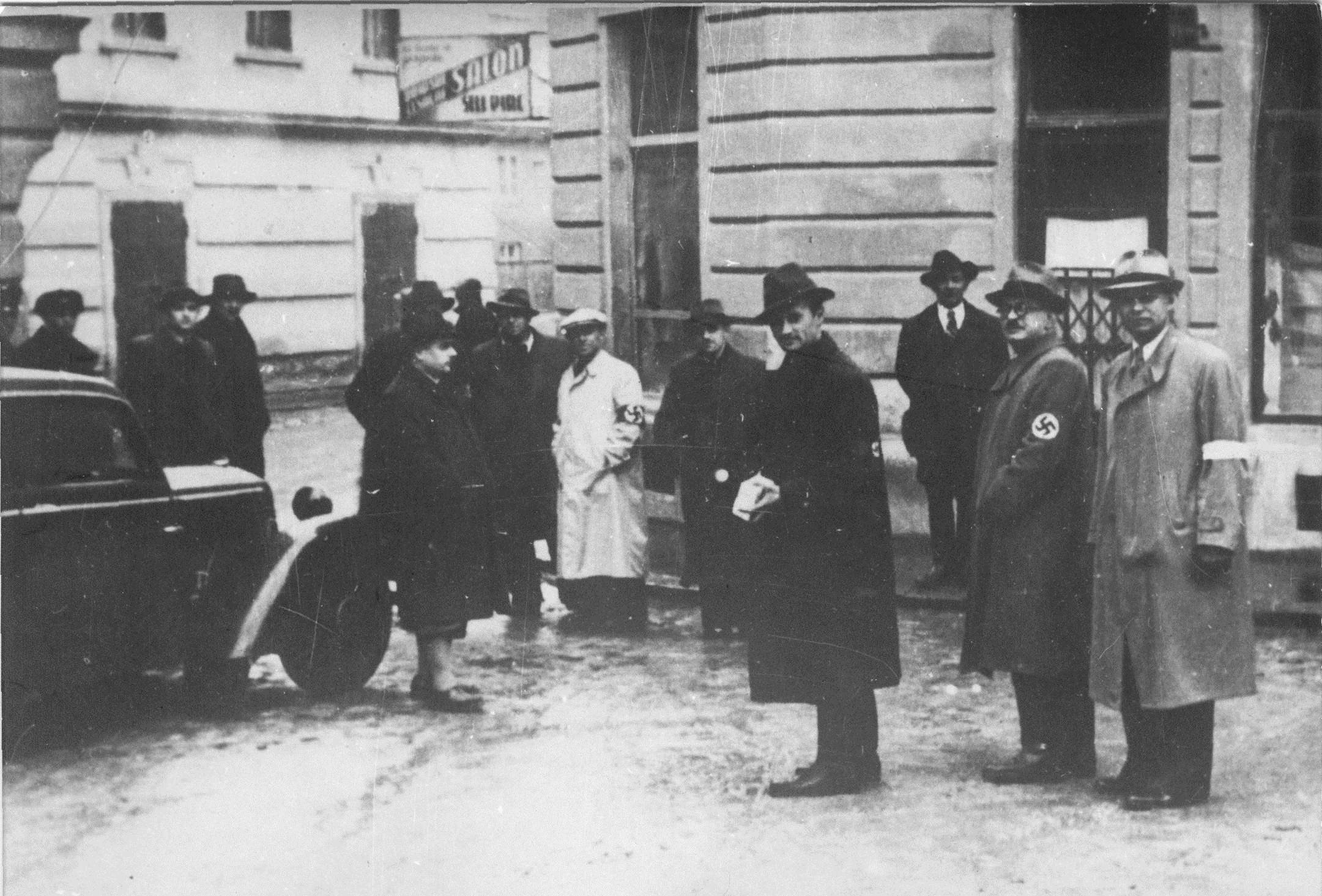
Members of Kulturbund in Maribor take authority from Yugoslav police during the April 1941 German annexation of northern Slovenia.

Swabian-German Cultural Association (German: Schwäbisch-Deutscher Kulturbund) or Kulturbund was a cultural, social, and political organization of the ethnic Germans in the Kingdom of Yugoslavia. During World War II, the Kulturbund promoted Nazism in the Yugoslavian German community and collaborated with the German occupational authorities.

Founded in June 1920 in Novi Sad, it was originally conceived as a cultural and social organization representing the interests of the nearly 500,000 ethnic Germans in Yugoslavia in the interwar period and preserving their culture and language by promoting German-language education and publishing a German-language newspaper, the Deutsches Volksblatt, while also campaigning for Germans' land rights. In the 1920s, the organization's motto was "faithful to country, faithful to nation" (German: "staatstreu und volkstreu"), which the Kulturbund leadership intended as a gesture of loyalty to the newly founded Yugoslavian state while also working to represent the interests of the German minority. However, some historians have argued that Germans (as well as Hungarians) in Yugoslavia did not collectively develop an allegiance to their new country for myriad reasons, including Serbo-Croatian's legal status as the official language; the German community's negligible influence on the drafting of the 1921 constitution and lack of representation in subsequent government administrations; the higher taxes levied on the provinces of Vojvodina and Slovenia, where the majority of the Yugoslavian Germans lived; and the exclusion of German peasant farmers from the agrarian reforms of the late 1910s and early 1920s. In 1922, the Kulturbund organized the German Party, a conservative minority political party that held between five and eight seats in the Parliament of Yugoslavia in the 1920s, until it was banned during the 6 January Dictatorship.

While the organization was controlled by an older generation of conservative, Roman Catholic ethnic Germans in the 1920s and early 1930s, the Kulturbund came under the control of younger pro-Nazi elements in the late 1930s, partly because of the machinations of the SS-controlled Volksdeutsche Mittelstelle. In 1939, Nazi-sympathizer and collaborator Sepp Janko was elected president of the organization. Janko claimed that by summer 1940, the organization had 300,000 members and was actively trying to recruit the additional 200,000 Germans living in Yugoslavia.

During the Axis Invasion of Yugoslavia, the Kulturbund acted as the fifth column. In March 1941, the Nazi agents of the Volksdeutsche Mittelstelle covertly instructed Yugoslavian Germans that if they should be conscripted into the Yugoslavian military, they should desert at the first opportunity and flee to Nazi Germany via Hungary. Additionally, Janko covertly organized a paramilitary group under the guise of a sports organization in order to aid the German military. After the Yugoslavian defeat in April 1941, the Axis powers partitioned and occupied Yugoslavia. Yugoslavian Germans were divided between four different occupation zones and puppet states. While local chapters of the Kulturbund continued to operate throughout the occupied Yugoslavian territory during the war, Sepp Janko's centralized Kulturbund saw its jurisdiction drastically shrink. Novi Sad, the location of the organization's headquarters, was occupied by Hungary, and the Janko received instructions from Berlin to move his headquarters to Banat, where the Kulturbund was tasked with organizing Volksdeutsche collaborators among the region's 130,000 ethnic Germans. In 1944, when the Axis was losing the war in the Balkans, members of the Kulturbund were some of the loudest voices calling for ethnic Germans to abandon their land, evacuate Yugoslavia and head to safer areas of the German Reich.

== Literature ==
- Suppan, Arnold (2019). Hitler–Beneš–Tito: National Conflicts, World Wars, Genocides, Expulsions, and Divided Remembrance in East-Central and Southeastern Europe, 1848–2018. Vienna: Austrian Academy of Sciences Press. ISBN 978-3-7001-8410-2. JSTOR j.ctvvh867x.
- Tomasevich, Jozo (2002). War and Revolution in Yugoslavia, 1941-1945: Occupation and Collaboration. Stanford: Stanford University Press. ISBN 978-0-8047-3615-2.
