= Banat (1941–1944) =

German-occupied political entity during World War II

- Administrative unit of the Territory of the Military Commander in Serbia
- 1941–1944
- Flag Insignia

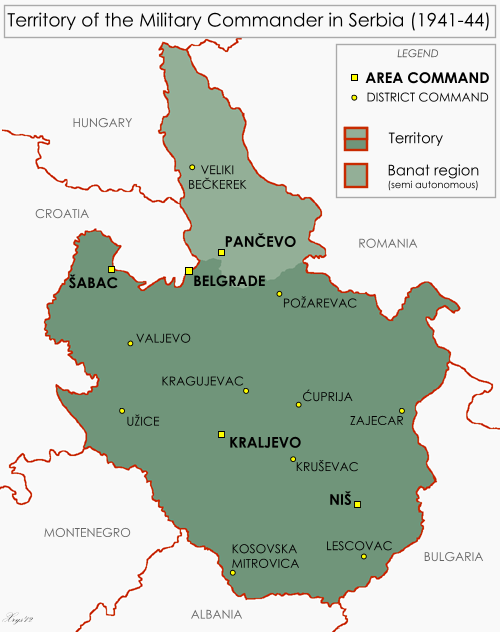
- Banat (lighter green) within the Territory of the Military; Commander in Serbia (darker green).
- Capital: Veliki Bečkerek (Petrovgrad)
- Area
  - 1931: 9,300 km^{2} (3,600 sq mi)
- Population
  - 1931: 585,579
- Government
  - Type: Minority authoritarianism
- Vice Governor
  - 1941–1944: Josef Lapp
- Historical era: World War II
  - Balkans campaign: 1941
  - Belgrade offensive: 1944
Preceded by	Succeeded by
Kingdom of Yugoslavia	Socialist Federal Republic of Yugoslavia
- Today part of: Serbia

The Banat was a political entity established in 1941 after the occupation and partition of Yugoslavia by the Axis powers in the historical Banat region. It was formally under the control of the German puppet Government of National Salvation in Belgrade, which theoretically had limited jurisdiction over all of the Territory of the Military Commander in Serbia, (Note: Official name of the occupied territory) but all power within the Banat was in the hands of the local minority of ethnic Germans (Volksdeutsche). The regional civilian commissioner and head of the ethnic German minority was Josef Lapp. Following the ousting of Axis forces in 1944, this German-ruled region was dissolved and most of its territory was included into Vojvodina, one of the two autonomous provinces of Serbia within the new SFR Yugoslavia. There were plans of creating a bigger South German buffer state which would be controlled by ethnic Germans living in the region, but the Banat was the only part of the plan that was actually accomplished.

== History ==
=== German plans for the future ===
The local German population agitated for the German government to establish a large German state in the Danube and Tisza valleys, expressing annoyance that the Bačka and Syrmia regions in the west were awarded to Hungary and Croatia respectively after the collapse of Yugoslavia. In spite of repeated personal appeals to Adolf Hitler, they were rebuffed in this objective. In the interest of maintaining close political ties with the Hungarian and Romanian regimes Berlin preferred to retain the Banat as a potential bargaining chip with these countries, both of which desired to annex the area (see also Greater Hungary and Greater Romania). In order to avoid offending either ally it was placed within the Territory of the Military Commander in Serbia. Because this theoretically placed the Banat under the control of the puppet Nedić government, the Germans ordered the puppet government to proclaim it a separate administrative area under an ethnic-German vice-governor (Vice-Banus), who was to have sole administrative authority of the region.

The Banat Germans subsequently used every means at their disposal to strengthen their position compared to that of other nationalities, and to foster the development of German national feeling through the establishment of youth and adult organizations, and setting up its own school system. These attempts were made to convince the Nazi authorities of the desirability of creating a new Gau in the Danube area and parts of Transylvania (Siebenbürgen) which they tentatively called the Prinz-Eugen Gau, a goal never officially supported by the war-time German government.

Nazi plans for the Territory of the Military Commander in Serbia as a whole however intended for the country to remain under some form of permanent German control. This was believed necessary to ensure German dominion over the Danubian basin of Southeast Europe, an economically vital area in consideration of Germany's wartime goals for the eastern territories that it expected to conquer in the Soviet Union. German plans did call for re-making the strategically located city of Belgrade as a "fortress-city of the Reich" (Reichsfestung Belgrad) to ensure control over the Iron Gates, populated only by Germans. The city's possible renaming to Prinz-Eugen-Stadt was also discussed.

=== War crimes against Jews and Roma ===
The region was ruled by the German army. The Germans instituted anti-Jewish measures immediately after the German invasion and occupation of Yugoslavia. The Jewish population of the city of Zrenjanin was rounded up and sent to the Sajmište concentration camp near Belgrade where they were executed. In September 1941, there was a mass hanging of anti fascist Serb and Jewish civilians. Jews were also forced into labor battalions to do forced work for the German occupation authorities. In August 1942, German officials announced that the area was judenrein, i.e. "clean of Jews". Between 1941 and 1944, at a Stratište locality near Jabuka village in Banat, more than 10,000 Serbs (who were mainly from NDH), Jews and Roma were killed by German forces.

=== SS Division Prinz Eugen ===
After the Nazi occupation of Yugoslavia had been established, the 7th SS Volunteer Mountain Division Prinz Eugen was formed from Yugoslav Germans (Volksdeutsche). The backbone of the division was made up of ethnic Germans from Banat itself, many of whom had been former officers and NCOs in either the Royal Yugoslav Army or even the Habsburg army. The core of the Division was made up of the SS controlled Protection Force or Selbstschutz consisting of Volksdeutsche from the Territory of the Military Commander in Serbia.

"After the initial rush of Volksdeutsche to join, voluntary enlistments tapered off, and the new unit did not reach division size. Therefore, in August 1941, the SS discarded the voluntary approach, and after a favourable judgement from the SS court in Belgrade, imposed a mandatory military obligation on all Volksdeutsche in Serbia-Banat, the first of its kind for non-Reich Germans."

Consequently, over 21,500 ethnic Germans from the Territory of the Military Commander in Serbia were conscripted into the Waffen SS.

The staff of the Prinz Eugen Division was based in the city of Pančevo in Banat. The division was formed between April and October, 1942 and was commanded by the Romanian Volksdeutsche SS Gruppenfuehrer and General-lieutenant of the Waffen SS, Artur Phleps. By December 31, 1941, the division was made up of 21,102 men. The Prinz Eugen SS Division was deployed throughout the former Yugoslavia to put down the Yugoslav Partisans, but was largely unsuccessful. During the campaigns it became infamous for reprisals and atrocities against innocent Yugoslav civilians. The division was formally accused of committing atrocities against POWs and civilians during World War II at the Nuremberg War Crimes Trials.

=== Post-war fate of ethnic Germans ===
At the end of the war, in retribution, Partisan bands engaged in massacres of ethnic Germans, primarily in the area of present-day Vojvodina. Villages were wiped out, with the inhabitants either killed or forced into concentration camps, where many died of hunger or disease. The provisional government of Tito’s Partisan movement was the AVNOJ (Anti-Fascist Council for the National Liberation of Yugoslavia). In its meeting in Belgrade on November 21, 1944, it decreed that all property of ethnic Germans residing in Yugoslavia be confiscated. Their Yugoslav citizenship was revoked, they no longer had any civil rights, and they were declared enemies of the people. Exempted were those ethnic Germans who participated in the partisan national liberation movement, and those who were not members of German ethnic societies such as the “Schwäbisch–Deutsche Kulturbund", nor declared themselves to be members of the ethnic German community.

Of the approximately 524,000 Germans living in pre-war Yugoslavia, about 370,000 escaped to Germany in the last days of the War or were subsequently expelled by the Yugoslav Government (at one point, in January 1946, the Yugoslav Government requested the U.S. military authorities’ permission to transfer these ethnic Germans to the American-occupied zone of Germany, but it was not granted). Of this number, 30,000 to 40,000 escaped from Yugoslav concentration and work camps, often with the connivance of the authorities, most going either to Hungary or Romania. Those who went to Hungary, later subsequently fled or were expelled to Austria or Germany, whereas those who fled to Romania generally remained, at least provisionally, in the Swabian communities in the Romanian Banat. About 55,000 people died in the concentration camps, another 31,000 died serving in the German armed forces, and about 31,000 disappeared, mostly likely dead, with another 37,000 still unaccounted for. Thus the total victims of the war and subsequent ethnic cleansing and killings comprised about 30% of the pre-war German population.

The Serbian census from 2002 records 3,901 Germans in Serbia, of which 3,154 in the province of Vojvodina. In December 2007 they formed their own minority council in Novi Sad, which they were entitled to with 3,000 voter signatures. The president, Andreas Biegermeier, stated that the council will focus on property restitution, and marking of mass graves and camp sites. He estimated the total number of remaining Danube Swabians in Serbia and their descents at 5,000–8,000. In 2007 Banat Schwabians formed a national council.

== Population ==
=== Ethnic groups ===
According to the 1931 census, the population of the region numbered 585,579 people, including:

- Serbs = 261,123 (44.59%)
- Germans = 120,541 (20.58%)
- Hungarians = 95,867 (16.37%)
- Romanians = 62,365 (10.65%)
- Slovaks = 17,900 (3.06%)
- Croats = 12,546 (2.14%)
- others = 15,237 (2.61%)

=== Religion ===
By religion, the population included (1931 data):

- Orthodox Christians = 321,262 (56.71%)
- Roman Catholics = 196,087 (34.62%)
- Protestants = 37,179 (6.56%)
- others = 11,932 (2.11%)

== Number of victims ==
During the war, German Axis troops killed 7,513 inhabitants of Banat, including:

- 2,211 people who were killed directly
- 1,294 people who were sent to concentration camps and killed there
- 1,498 people who were sent to forced labour and killed there
- 152 people who were mobilized and later killed
- 2,358 killed members of the resistance movement

Of the total number of the victims (excluding members of the resistance movement), 4,010 were men, 631 were women, 243 were elderly people, and 271 were children.

Note: This list includes only native inhabitants of Banat who fell as victims of Axis occupation. Civilians who were brought from other parts of occupied Yugoslavia and killed in Banat by German forces are not counted in this list.

== See also ==
- Hungarian occupation of Yugoslav territories
- 7th SS Volunteer Mountain Division Prinz Eugen
- History of Vojvodina
- History of Serbia
- Banat

== Footnotes ==
Region	until 1918	1918– 1929	1929– 1945	1941– 1945	1945– 1946	1946– 1963	1963– 1992	1992– 2003	2003– 2006	2006– 2008	since 2008
Slovenia	Part of Austria-Hungary including the Bay of Kotor See also: Kingdom of Croatia-Slavonia (1868–1918) Kingdom of Dalmatia (1815–1918) Condominium of Bosnia and Herzegovina (1878–1918)	State of Slovenes, Croats and Serbs (1918) Kingdom of Serbs, Croats and Slovenes (1918–1929) Kingdom of Yugoslavia (1929–1943) See also: Republic of Prekmurje (1919) Banat, Bačka and Baranja (1918–1919) Free State of Fiume (1920–1924) (1924–1945) Italian province of Zadar (1920–1947)		Annexed by Italy, Germany, and Hungary^{a}	Democratic Federal Yugoslavia (1943–1945) Federal People's Republic of Yugoslavia (1945–1963) Socialist Federal Republic of Yugoslavia (1963–1992) Consisted of the Socialist Republics of: Slovenia (1945–1991); Croatia (1945–1991); Bosnia and Herzegovina (1945–1992) Serbia (1945–1992) (included the autonomous provinces of Vojvodina and Kosovo) Montenegro (1945–1992); Macedonia (1945–1991) See also: Free Territory of Trieste (1947–1954)^{h}			Republic of Slovenia; Ten-Day War			
Dalmatia	Part of Austria-Hungary including the Bay of Kotor See also: Kingdom of Croatia-Slavonia (1868–1918) Kingdom of Dalmatia (1815–1918) Condominium of Bosnia and Herzegovina (1878–1918)	State of Slovenes, Croats and Serbs (1918) Kingdom of Serbs, Croats and Slovenes (1918–1929) Kingdom of Yugoslavia (1929–1943) See also: Republic of Prekmurje (1919) Banat, Bačka and Baranja (1918–1919) Free State of Fiume (1920–1924) (1924–1945) Italian province of Zadar (1920–1947)		Independent State of Croatia (1941–1945) Puppet state of Germany. Parts annexed by Italy. Međimurje and Baranja annexed by Hungary.	Democratic Federal Yugoslavia (1943–1945) Federal People's Republic of Yugoslavia (1945–1963) Socialist Federal Republic of Yugoslavia (1963–1992) Consisted of the Socialist Republics of: Slovenia (1945–1991); Croatia (1945–1991); Bosnia and Herzegovina (1945–1992) Serbia (1945–1992) (included the autonomous provinces of Vojvodina and Kosovo) Montenegro (1945–1992); Macedonia (1945–1991) See also: Free Territory of Trieste (1947–1954)^{h}			Republic of Croatia^{b} Croatian War of Independence			
Slavonia	Part of Austria-Hungary including the Bay of Kotor See also: Kingdom of Croatia-Slavonia (1868–1918) Kingdom of Dalmatia (1815–1918) Condominium of Bosnia and Herzegovina (1878–1918)	State of Slovenes, Croats and Serbs (1918) Kingdom of Serbs, Croats and Slovenes (1918–1929) Kingdom of Yugoslavia (1929–1943) See also: Republic of Prekmurje (1919) Banat, Bačka and Baranja (1918–1919) Free State of Fiume (1920–1924) (1924–1945) Italian province of Zadar (1920–1947)		Independent State of Croatia (1941–1945) Puppet state of Germany. Parts annexed by Italy. Međimurje and Baranja annexed by Hungary.	Democratic Federal Yugoslavia (1943–1945) Federal People's Republic of Yugoslavia (1945–1963) Socialist Federal Republic of Yugoslavia (1963–1992) Consisted of the Socialist Republics of: Slovenia (1945–1991); Croatia (1945–1991); Bosnia and Herzegovina (1945–1992) Serbia (1945–1992) (included the autonomous provinces of Vojvodina and Kosovo) Montenegro (1945–1992); Macedonia (1945–1991) See also: Free Territory of Trieste (1947–1954)^{h}			Republic of Croatia^{b} Croatian War of Independence			
Croatia	Part of Austria-Hungary including the Bay of Kotor See also: Kingdom of Croatia-Slavonia (1868–1918) Kingdom of Dalmatia (1815–1918) Condominium of Bosnia and Herzegovina (1878–1918)	State of Slovenes, Croats and Serbs (1918) Kingdom of Serbs, Croats and Slovenes (1918–1929) Kingdom of Yugoslavia (1929–1943) See also: Republic of Prekmurje (1919) Banat, Bačka and Baranja (1918–1919) Free State of Fiume (1920–1924) (1924–1945) Italian province of Zadar (1920–1947)		Independent State of Croatia (1941–1945) Puppet state of Germany. Parts annexed by Italy. Međimurje and Baranja annexed by Hungary.	Democratic Federal Yugoslavia (1943–1945) Federal People's Republic of Yugoslavia (1945–1963) Socialist Federal Republic of Yugoslavia (1963–1992) Consisted of the Socialist Republics of: Slovenia (1945–1991); Croatia (1945–1991); Bosnia and Herzegovina (1945–1992) Serbia (1945–1992) (included the autonomous provinces of Vojvodina and Kosovo) Montenegro (1945–1992); Macedonia (1945–1991) See also: Free Territory of Trieste (1947–1954)^{h}			Republic of Croatia^{b} Croatian War of Independence			
Bosnia	Part of Austria-Hungary including the Bay of Kotor See also: Kingdom of Croatia-Slavonia (1868–1918) Kingdom of Dalmatia (1815–1918) Condominium of Bosnia and Herzegovina (1878–1918)	State of Slovenes, Croats and Serbs (1918) Kingdom of Serbs, Croats and Slovenes (1918–1929) Kingdom of Yugoslavia (1929–1943) See also: Republic of Prekmurje (1919) Banat, Bačka and Baranja (1918–1919) Free State of Fiume (1920–1924) (1924–1945) Italian province of Zadar (1920–1947)		Independent State of Croatia (1941–1945) Puppet state of Germany. Parts annexed by Italy. Međimurje and Baranja annexed by Hungary.	Democratic Federal Yugoslavia (1943–1945) Federal People's Republic of Yugoslavia (1945–1963) Socialist Federal Republic of Yugoslavia (1963–1992) Consisted of the Socialist Republics of: Slovenia (1945–1991); Croatia (1945–1991); Bosnia and Herzegovina (1945–1992) Serbia (1945–1992) (included the autonomous provinces of Vojvodina and Kosovo) Montenegro (1945–1992); Macedonia (1945–1991) See also: Free Territory of Trieste (1947–1954)^{h}			Bosnia and Herzegovina^{c} Bosnian War Consists of the Federation of Bosnia and Herzegovina (since 1995), Republika Srpska (since 1995), and Brčko District (since 2000).			
Herzegovina	Part of Austria-Hungary including the Bay of Kotor See also: Kingdom of Croatia-Slavonia (1868–1918) Kingdom of Dalmatia (1815–1918) Condominium of Bosnia and Herzegovina (1878–1918)	State of Slovenes, Croats and Serbs (1918) Kingdom of Serbs, Croats and Slovenes (1918–1929) Kingdom of Yugoslavia (1929–1943) See also: Republic of Prekmurje (1919) Banat, Bačka and Baranja (1918–1919) Free State of Fiume (1920–1924) (1924–1945) Italian province of Zadar (1920–1947)		Independent State of Croatia (1941–1945) Puppet state of Germany. Parts annexed by Italy. Međimurje and Baranja annexed by Hungary.	Democratic Federal Yugoslavia (1943–1945) Federal People's Republic of Yugoslavia (1945–1963) Socialist Federal Republic of Yugoslavia (1963–1992) Consisted of the Socialist Republics of: Slovenia (1945–1991); Croatia (1945–1991); Bosnia and Herzegovina (1945–1992) Serbia (1945–1992) (included the autonomous provinces of Vojvodina and Kosovo) Montenegro (1945–1992); Macedonia (1945–1991) See also: Free Territory of Trieste (1947–1954)^{h}			Bosnia and Herzegovina^{c} Bosnian War Consists of the Federation of Bosnia and Herzegovina (since 1995), Republika Srpska (since 1995), and Brčko District (since 2000).			
Vojvodina	Part of the Délvidék region of Hungary	State of Slovenes, Croats and Serbs (1918) Kingdom of Serbs, Croats and Slovenes (1918–1929) Kingdom of Yugoslavia (1929–1943) See also: Republic of Prekmurje (1919) Banat, Bačka and Baranja (1918–1919) Free State of Fiume (1920–1924) (1924–1945) Italian province of Zadar (1920–1947)		Autonomous Banat^{d} (part of the German; Territory of the Military Commander in Serbia)	Democratic Federal Yugoslavia (1943–1945) Federal People's Republic of Yugoslavia (1945–1963) Socialist Federal Republic of Yugoslavia (1963–1992) Consisted of the Socialist Republics of: Slovenia (1945–1991); Croatia (1945–1991); Bosnia and Herzegovina (1945–1992) Serbia (1945–1992) (included the autonomous provinces of Vojvodina and Kosovo) Montenegro (1945–1992); Macedonia (1945–1991) See also: Free Territory of Trieste (1947–1954)^{h}			Federal Republic of Yugoslavia Consisted of the Republic of Serbia (1992–2006) and Republic of Montenegro (1992–2006) Included Kosovo and Metohija, under UN administration, without control since 1999	State Union of Serbia and Montenegro Included Kosovo, under UN administration	Republic of Serbia Included the autonomous provinces of Vojvodina and Kosovo and Metohija under UN administration	Republic of Serbia Includes the autonomous province of Vojvodina; Kosovo claim
Central Serbia	Kingdom of Serbia (1882–1918)	State of Slovenes, Croats and Serbs (1918) Kingdom of Serbs, Croats and Slovenes (1918–1929) Kingdom of Yugoslavia (1929–1943) See also: Republic of Prekmurje (1919) Banat, Bačka and Baranja (1918–1919) Free State of Fiume (1920–1924) (1924–1945) Italian province of Zadar (1920–1947)		Territory of the Military Commander in Serbia (1941–1944) ^{e}	Democratic Federal Yugoslavia (1943–1945) Federal People's Republic of Yugoslavia (1945–1963) Socialist Federal Republic of Yugoslavia (1963–1992) Consisted of the Socialist Republics of: Slovenia (1945–1991); Croatia (1945–1991); Bosnia and Herzegovina (1945–1992) Serbia (1945–1992) (included the autonomous provinces of Vojvodina and Kosovo) Montenegro (1945–1992); Macedonia (1945–1991) See also: Free Territory of Trieste (1947–1954)^{h}			Federal Republic of Yugoslavia Consisted of the Republic of Serbia (1992–2006) and Republic of Montenegro (1992–2006) Included Kosovo and Metohija, under UN administration, without control since 1999	State Union of Serbia and Montenegro Included Kosovo, under UN administration	Republic of Serbia Included the autonomous provinces of Vojvodina and Kosovo and Metohija under UN administration	Republic of Serbia Includes the autonomous province of Vojvodina; Kosovo claim
Kosovo	Part of the Kingdom of Serbia (1912–1918)	State of Slovenes, Croats and Serbs (1918) Kingdom of Serbs, Croats and Slovenes (1918–1929) Kingdom of Yugoslavia (1929–1943) See also: Republic of Prekmurje (1919) Banat, Bačka and Baranja (1918–1919) Free State of Fiume (1920–1924) (1924–1945) Italian province of Zadar (1920–1947)		Mostly annexed by Italian Albania (1941–1944) along with western Macedonia and south-eastern Montenegro	Democratic Federal Yugoslavia (1943–1945) Federal People's Republic of Yugoslavia (1945–1963) Socialist Federal Republic of Yugoslavia (1963–1992) Consisted of the Socialist Republics of: Slovenia (1945–1991); Croatia (1945–1991); Bosnia and Herzegovina (1945–1992) Serbia (1945–1992) (included the autonomous provinces of Vojvodina and Kosovo) Montenegro (1945–1992); Macedonia (1945–1991) See also: Free Territory of Trieste (1947–1954)^{h}			Federal Republic of Yugoslavia Consisted of the Republic of Serbia (1992–2006) and Republic of Montenegro (1992–2006) Included Kosovo and Metohija, under UN administration, without control since 1999	State Union of Serbia and Montenegro Included Kosovo, under UN administration	Republic of Serbia Included the autonomous provinces of Vojvodina and Kosovo and Metohija under UN administration	Republic of Kosovo
Metohija	Kingdom of Montenegro (1910–1918) Metohija controlled by Austria-Hungary 1915–1918	State of Slovenes, Croats and Serbs (1918) Kingdom of Serbs, Croats and Slovenes (1918–1929) Kingdom of Yugoslavia (1929–1943) See also: Republic of Prekmurje (1919) Banat, Bačka and Baranja (1918–1919) Free State of Fiume (1920–1924) (1924–1945) Italian province of Zadar (1920–1947)		Mostly annexed by Italian Albania (1941–1944) along with western Macedonia and south-eastern Montenegro	Democratic Federal Yugoslavia (1943–1945) Federal People's Republic of Yugoslavia (1945–1963) Socialist Federal Republic of Yugoslavia (1963–1992) Consisted of the Socialist Republics of: Slovenia (1945–1991); Croatia (1945–1991); Bosnia and Herzegovina (1945–1992) Serbia (1945–1992) (included the autonomous provinces of Vojvodina and Kosovo) Montenegro (1945–1992); Macedonia (1945–1991) See also: Free Territory of Trieste (1947–1954)^{h}			Federal Republic of Yugoslavia Consisted of the Republic of Serbia (1992–2006) and Republic of Montenegro (1992–2006) Included Kosovo and Metohija, under UN administration, without control since 1999	State Union of Serbia and Montenegro Included Kosovo, under UN administration	Republic of Serbia Included the autonomous provinces of Vojvodina and Kosovo and Metohija under UN administration	Republic of Kosovo
Montenegro and Brda	Kingdom of Montenegro (1910–1918) Metohija controlled by Austria-Hungary 1915–1918	State of Slovenes, Croats and Serbs (1918) Kingdom of Serbs, Croats and Slovenes (1918–1929) Kingdom of Yugoslavia (1929–1943) See also: Republic of Prekmurje (1919) Banat, Bačka and Baranja (1918–1919) Free State of Fiume (1920–1924) (1924–1945) Italian province of Zadar (1920–1947)		Protectorate of Montenegro^{f} (1941–1944)	Democratic Federal Yugoslavia (1943–1945) Federal People's Republic of Yugoslavia (1945–1963) Socialist Federal Republic of Yugoslavia (1963–1992) Consisted of the Socialist Republics of: Slovenia (1945–1991); Croatia (1945–1991); Bosnia and Herzegovina (1945–1992) Serbia (1945–1992) (included the autonomous provinces of Vojvodina and Kosovo) Montenegro (1945–1992); Macedonia (1945–1991) See also: Free Territory of Trieste (1947–1954)^{h}			Federal Republic of Yugoslavia Consisted of the Republic of Serbia (1992–2006) and Republic of Montenegro (1992–2006) Included Kosovo and Metohija, under UN administration, without control since 1999	State Union of Serbia and Montenegro Included Kosovo, under UN administration	Montenegro	
Vardar Macedonia	Part of the Kingdom of Serbia (1912–1918)	State of Slovenes, Croats and Serbs (1918) Kingdom of Serbs, Croats and Slovenes (1918–1929) Kingdom of Yugoslavia (1929–1943) See also: Republic of Prekmurje (1919) Banat, Bačka and Baranja (1918–1919) Free State of Fiume (1920–1924) (1924–1945) Italian province of Zadar (1920–1947)		Annexed by the Kingdom of Bulgaria (1941–1944)	Democratic Federal Yugoslavia (1943–1945) Federal People's Republic of Yugoslavia (1945–1963) Socialist Federal Republic of Yugoslavia (1963–1992) Consisted of the Socialist Republics of: Slovenia (1945–1991); Croatia (1945–1991); Bosnia and Herzegovina (1945–1992) Serbia (1945–1992) (included the autonomous provinces of Vojvodina and Kosovo) Montenegro (1945–1992); Macedonia (1945–1991) See also: Free Territory of Trieste (1947–1954)^{h}			Republic of North Macedonia^{g}			
^{a} Prekmurje annexed by Hungary.; ^{b} See also: SAO Kninska Krajina (1990) → SAO Krajina (1990–1991); and SAO Eastern Slavonia, Baranja and Western Syrmia (1990–1991), SAO Western Slavonia (1990–1991) and the Republic of Serbian Krajina (1990–1995), all replaced by the UN Transitional Administration for Eastern Slavonia, Baranja and Western Sirmium (1996–1998).; ^{c} See also: Republic of Bosnia and Herzegovina; Croatian Republic of Herzeg-Bosnia; and the Serbian Autonomous Oblasts (SAOs) of Bosanska Krajina, North-East Bosnia, Romanija and Herzegovina (1991–1992), which all combined to form the Serbian Republic of Bosnia and Herzegovina (1992–1995).; ^{d} Bačka was reannexed by Hungary (1941–1944), while Syrmia was annexed by the Independent State of Croatia (1941–1944).; ^{e} Including North Kosovo. See also: Republic of Užice.; ^{f} Annexed by Italy (1941–1943) and Germany (1943–1944). Smaller part annexed by the Independent State of Croatia (1941–1944).; ^{g} North Macedonia's official and constitutional name was the Republic of Macedonia until 2019. It was known in the United Nations as the former Yugoslav Republic of Macedonia because of a naming dispute with Greece.; ^{h} Free Territory was established in 1947. Its administration was divided into two areas (Zone A) and (Zone B). Free Territory was de facto taken over by Italy and SFRY in 1954.
