= Sepp Janko =

SS officer (1905–2001)

Josef "Sepp" Janko
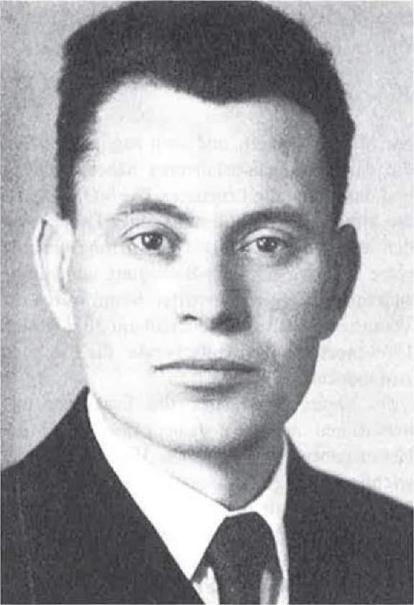

President of the Swabian-German Cultural Association
- In office 6 June 1939 – 1941

Personal details
- Born: 9 November 1905 Ernestovac, Austria-Hungary
- Died: 25 September 2001 (aged 95) Villa General Belgrano, Argentina

Military service
- Allegiance: Nazi Germany
- Branch/service: SS
- Years of service: 1941–1944
- Rank: Obersturmführer
- Battles/wars: World War II in Yugoslavia

Josef "Sepp" Janko (Serbo-Croatian: Jozef „Sep“ Janko / Јозеф „Сеп“ Јанко; 9 November 1905 — 25 September 2001) was a Volksgruppenführer ("Group Leader") of the Danube Swabian German Cultural Association (Schwäbisch-Deutschen Kulturbundes) in Yugoslavia in 1939, and later was appointed SS-Obersturmführer during World War II.

== Life ==
Janko was born on 9 November 1905 in Ernsthausen (Serbian: Ernestovac) into a Roman Catholic farming family of Swabian descent. He studied law in Graz.

Janko became increasingly racialist and pan-Germanic in his politics. On 6 June 1939, he was elected the president of the Swabian-German Cultural Association in Yugoslavia at the suggestion of the Reich agency Volksdeutsche Mittelstelle (VoMi). On 12 December 1940, he was awarded the Order of the Yugoslav Crown Class III by Prime Minister Dragiša Cvetković. After the invasion of the Wehrmacht early in 1941, the Cultural Association was disbanded and VoMi organised the Deutsche Volksgruppe in Serbien und Banat (DVSB) under Janko's leadership. Janko was simultaneously appointed an SS Obersturmführer in the Nazi-occupied Banat region of Serbia.

"Like other wartime [German] minority organizations, the DVSB was restructured along the lines of the NSDAP. Its most important branch was the paramilitary formation, the Deutsche Mannschaft, which here, as elsewhere, came under control of the SS. Janko and the DVSB cooperated fully with VoMi, and as a step in the minority's total Nazification, it even introduced a system of classifying the local Volksdeutsche similar to that used by the DVL in Poland."

== World War II ==
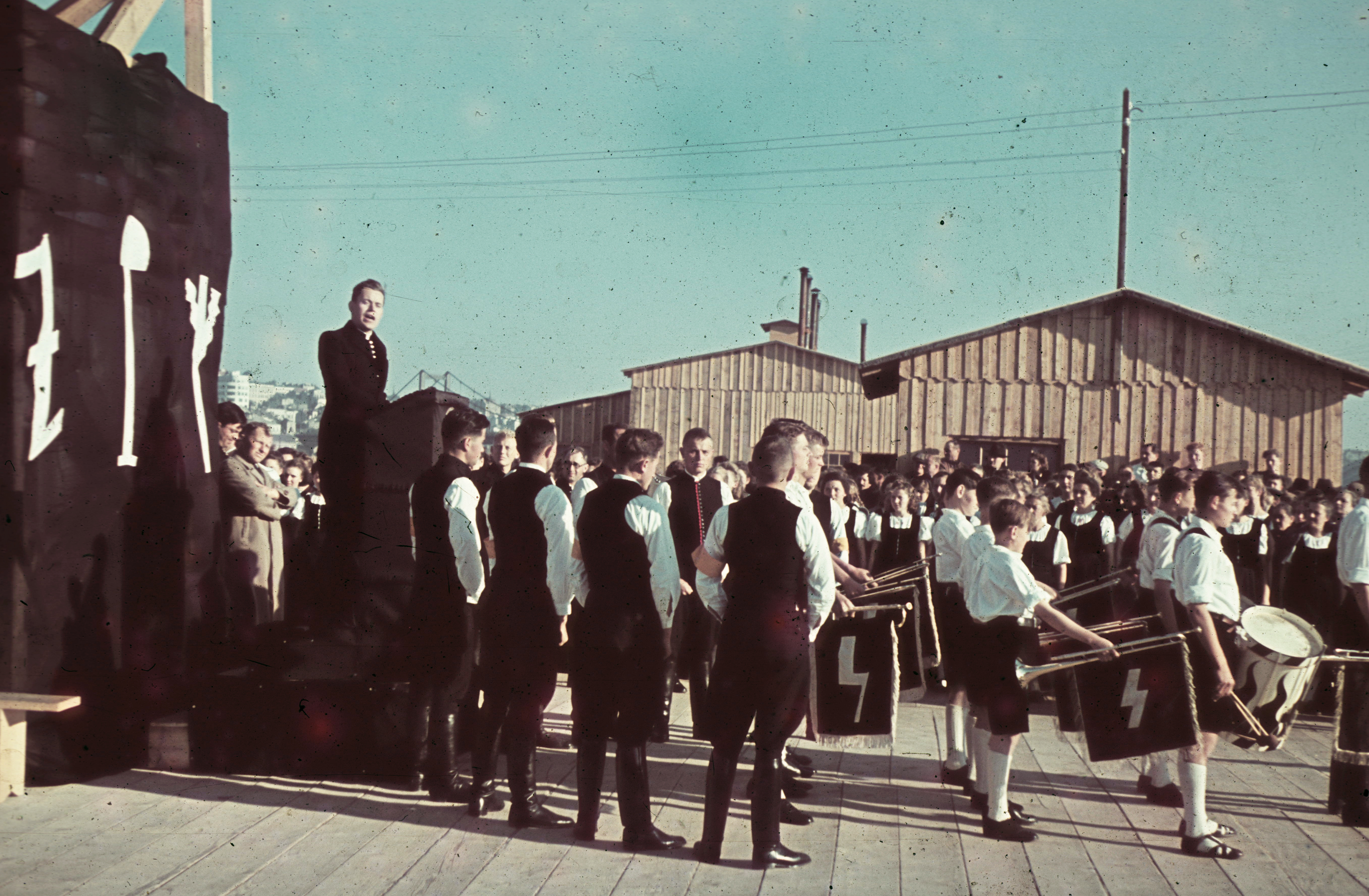
Dr. Sepp Janko, the chairman of the Danube Swabian German Cultural Association, delivers a speech to his fellow nationals in a refugee camp near Zemun 1940, during the resettlement of Bessarabian Germans into Nazi Germany according to an agreement between the Third Reich and the Soviet Union (then in amity).

After an initial burst of enthusiasm to join the German-sponsored Selbschutz ("self defence force") most Danube Swabians lost interest in the Third Reich. Voluntary enlistment collapsed quickly and in August 1941 the Waffen-SS enforced conscription and drafted local men into the Waffen-SS.

Janko objected and took the position that the legal obligation to provide services in the German Army for the members of the German ethnic groups (Volksdeutsche) did not exist, as this violated the Hague Regulations on war. Heinrich Himmler responded with dismay: “Es ist unmöglich, dass Deutsche in Europa irgendwo als Pazifisten herumhocken und sich von unseren Bataillonen beschützen lassen …“ ("It is impossible that Germans can be sitting around somewhere in Europe as pacifists and be protected by our battalions ...")

Janko responded by offering to set up a regiment of about 3,000 local ethnic Germans, with limited service interaction with the Wehrmacht and Waffen-SS. In April 1942, Himmler created the 7th SS Volunteer Mountain Division Prinz Eugen and began to conscript Volksdeutsche from Banat and Romania.

In his book (referenced below) Sepp Janko bragged about his ability to recruit sons of ethnic Germans from Banat region. This excerpt was used in Nuremberg war crimes trial in May 1946:

“ … I put at the disposal of the Fuehrer almost the entire German national group in the former State of Yugoslavia and gave him so many volunteers as soldiers, is to me a subject of great pride."

The Division was based in Banat but served across former Yugoslavia.

"The Waffen SS immediately enlisted 600 Volksdeutsche, and in July it announced plans for the formation of an exclusively German regiment. But in the Banat the SS encountered competition from the Wehrmacht, which had in mind sponsoring its own unit, a militia force of some 8,000 men. Himmler, alarmed by this development, took the case to Hitler and secured permission not only to create a new, exclusively Volksdeutsche SS division but also to take over the Wehrmacht's militia."

== Escape ==
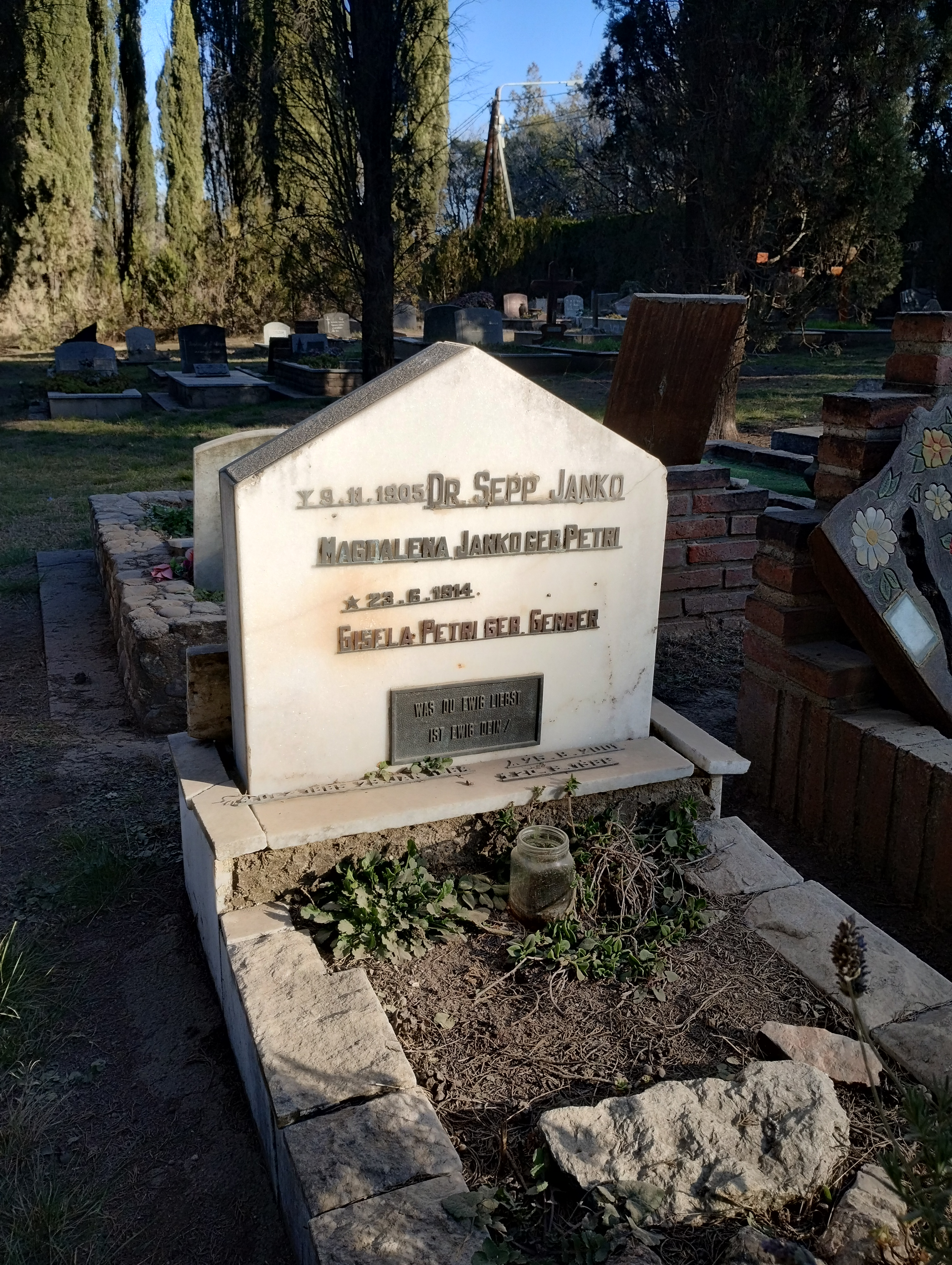
Sepp Janko's tomb in the German cemetery of Villa General Belgrano, Argentina

Janko was able to escape the National Liberation Army (Yugoslavia) in late 1944 to Austria, where he was arrested by United States forces and taken to the Wolfsberg camp in Carinthia. He was interned with the Nazi ambassador in Independent State of Croatia (Siegfried Kasche) and the German minority leader in Croatia (Branimir Altgayer). Kasche and Altgayer were delivered by the British to Tito and executed, but Janko managed to flee internment to Italy before his extradition from the camp.

In 1951, he fled from Genoa to Argentina on board the ship Entre Ríos, with a pass from the Red Cross issued in the name of José Petri. José stands for Joseph and Petri was his wife's maiden name; he had married Leni Petri in 1936 in a church wedding.

Janko was indicted by the Yugoslav government for war crimes. At the instigation of the Yugoslav government, he was arrested and imprisoned until his extradition. Due to intervention by President Juan Perón, Janko was released. He lived in Villa General Belgrano, in the central province of Córdoba, until his death in 2001, aged 95.

== Works ==
- 1943: Reden und Aufsätze (In a series of the German ethnic group in Banat and Serbia). Printed by the German ethnic group, Betschkerek 1943 and Ladislaus Frank, Belgrad 1943.
- 1982: Weg und Ende der deutschen Volksgruppe in Jugoslawien. Stocker: Graz und Stuttgart.
- 1983: Weg und Ende der deutschen Volksgruppe in Jugoslawien, 2. Edition. Stocker: Graz und Stuttgart 1983.

== Literature ==
- Stefan Karner. Die deutschsprachige Volksgruppe in Slowenien. Aspekte ihrer Entwicklung 1939-1997, (Klagenfurt u. a. 1998), Anm.95, p. 45 (nachfolgend zit. als: Karner, Die deutschsprachige Volksgruppe19)
- Arnold Suppan. Jugoslawien und Österreich 1918-1938: bilaterale Aussenpolitik, S:721 ff, Verlag für Geschichte und Politik Oldenbourg
- Hans Rasimus. Als Fremde im Vaterland, (München 1989)
- Bundesarchiv Koblenz: R57/165
- Valdis O. Lumans. Himmler's Auxiliaries: The Volksdeutsche Mittelstelle and the German Minorities of Europe, 1939-1945 (1993)
- Sepp Janko. Weg und Ende der deutschen. Volksgruppe in Jugoslawien. 2. Auflage (der Leopold Stocker Verlag, Graz—Stuttgart)
- Anton Scherer. Suevia-Pannonica, (Graz 2009)
- Johann Boehm. Die deutsche Volksgruppe in Jugoslawien 1918-1941: Innen- und Aussenpolitik
- Nuremberg Trial Proceedings Volume 14, ONE HUNDRED AND THIRTY-NINTH DAY, Monday, 27 May 1946. Yele Law School Library - The Avalon Project: Documents in Law, History, and Diplomacy.
