= Josef Lapp =

Politician

Josef "Sepp" Lapp
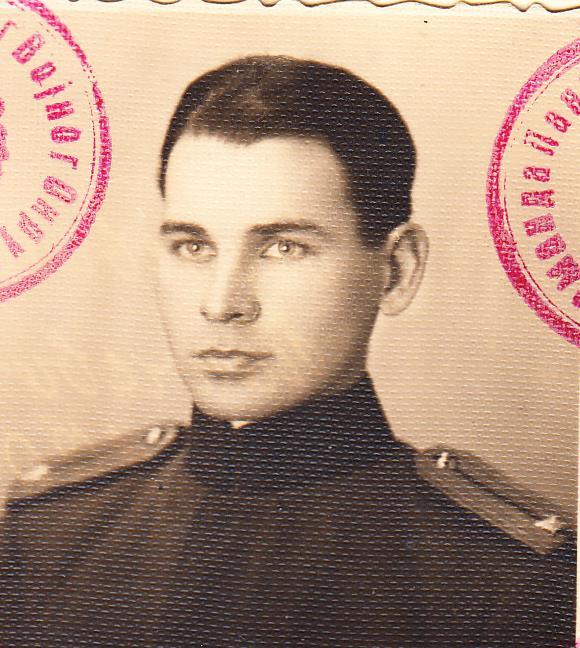
- Passport photo of Josef Lapp from 1936

Vice Banus of Banat
- In office 1941–1944
- Preceded by: office established
- Succeeded by: office abolished

Personal details
- Born: 18 October 1909 Kačarevo, Austria-Hungary
- Died: 18 February 1993 (aged 83) Hamburg, Germany

Military service
- Allegiance: Nazi Germany

Josef Lapp (18 October 1909 in Franzfeld, Austria-Hungary – 18 February 1993 in Hamburg, Germany) was a Danube Swabian and was the vice banus of Banat from 1941 until 1944.

== Career ==
Josef Lapp grew up as the son of a farmer. From 1915 on he attended the Hungarian elementary school in Franzfeld, changing 1921 to the German Realgymnasium in Pančevo, then from 1925 to 1929 the Serbian state Realgymnasium. He had later been married since 1936.

== Early life ==
Josef Lapp is a descendant of Georg Lapp from Gundelfingen/Breisgau, who was one of the first settlers in Franzfeld in the Banat in 1791). Franzfeld was located in the "military frontier", a strip of territory several hundred kilometers long, depopulated by wars and epidemics, north of the territories dominated by Turks on the Balkans.

In 1925, Josef Lapp, in order to learn the Serbian language, was boarded in Pantschowa with his father's Serbian war comrade from World War I, where he lived for four years. In this house, treated like their own son, he experienced with this Serbian Orthodox couple that the conflicts between the Balkan ethnic groups were by no means inevitable. Josef Lapp later, as vice banus in Banat, proved many times his tolerant, understanding and balancing attitude towards other ethnic groups. During his studies in Innsbruck, Josef Lapp joined the "Verein Deutscher Studenten Innsbruck". This fraternity saw itself as having a special responsibility to provide cultural support to German ethnic groups living outside the German and Austrian borders.

== Studies and early career ==
Josef Lapp studied and graduated in law in Zagreb from 1929 to 1937, with interruptions in the forms of a study visit to Innsbruck between 1930 and 1933, and military service in the Yugoslav army from 1934 to 1936. After passing the reserve officer's examination, Lapp was appointed as lieutenant of the reserve. From 1937, Josef Lapp worked as a lawyer at the local and district court in Pantschowa, later running a law practice together with a Serbian lawyer. Josef Lapp believed that the "schooled" had to be role models and teachers for all others in the village in every respect. During the summer vacations the village library was looked through, new books were ordered, plays were rehearsed, cultural events were organized, a traditional costume group was formed and folk dances were practiced.

== Nazi collaboration ==
In May 1941 – after the occupation of Yugoslavia by the Wehrmacht of Nazi Germany, Josef Lapp was appointed by the German site commander as provisional district administrator of Pantschowa. On 17 June 1941 he was appointed vice banus of Banat. As vice banus/chief of the administration, Josef Lapp was responsible for reorganizing the entire administration of Banat, including the education system, the police, infrastructure, and for ensuring the supply of food to the German occupiers. There was administrative chaos in the Banat, because many of the Serbian administrative officials who had previously worked there had fled when the Germans invaded. On his own initiative, Josef Lapp sent recommendations how to act to the counties and independent towns of the Banat and thus brought about a largely uniform approach to these administrative issues. Until August 1944, these tasks were carried out successfully with the help of capable administrative employees, who came from multiple ethnic groups represented in the Banat. The occupation of the Banat by Soviet troops and Partisans, put an end to the Banat government.

Lapp fled to Germany in October 1944, following the liberation of Vojvodina. In mid-1945, Josef Lapp was arrested in Bavaria by American occupation forces and taken to the civilian internment camp in Moosburg, near Munich. In June 1946, he fled from American custody to avoid extradition to communist Yugoslavia.

== Post-war career ==
From 1946 to 1952, Josef Lapp worked in various jobs in northern Germany. From March 1952 on, he was an employee of the tracing service of the German Red Cross in Hamburg. Initially, he was responsible for the "tracing of missing civilian prisoners in the countries of southeastern Europe" and then for the "assistance and counseling service for Germans in eastern and southeastern Europe."

From 1954 to 1974, Josef Lapp was Chairman of the Works Council at the tracing service of the German Red Cross in Hamburg (DRK Hamburg). From 1956 to 1979 Josef Lapp was chairman of the Danube Swabian Association in Hamburg (Landsmannschaft der Donauschwaben in Hamburg). After office hours, he held consultations with compatriots, some of whom had just arrived in Germany from the countries of southeastern Europe.

He retired as in January 1975, and passed away 18 years later in 1993 in Hamburg.

== Accolades ==
- Golden Pin of Honor of the Federal Association of the Danube Swabians
- Honorary Chairman of the Danube Swabian Association of Hamburg-Schleswig-Holstein
