= Prague Papers on the History of International Relations =

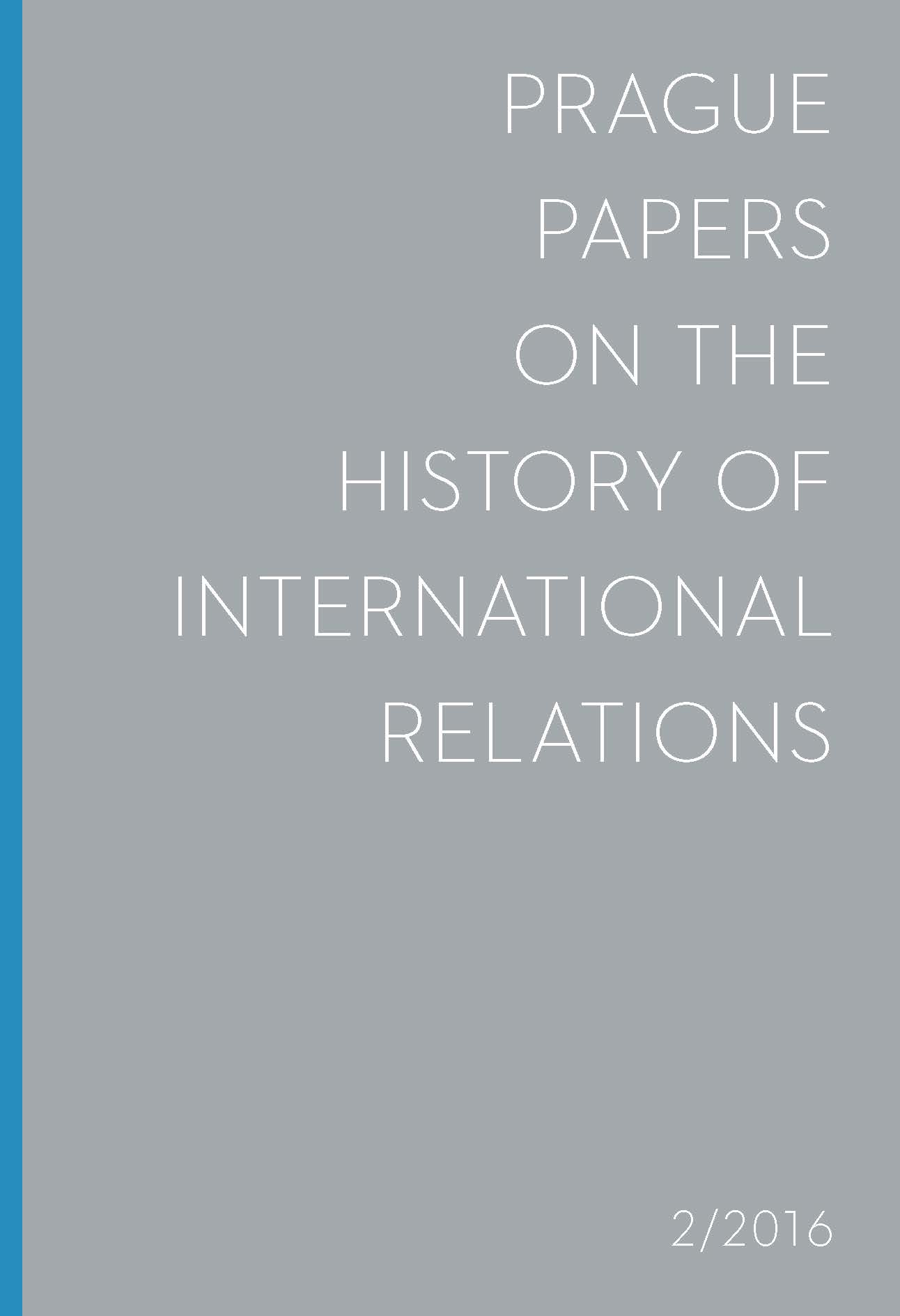
- Discipline: History of International Relations
- Language: English, French, German, Russian, Spanish
- Edited by: Václav Drška; Arnold Suppan

Publication details
- History: 1997-present
- Publisher: Faculty of Arts Press, Charles University (Czech Republic)
- Frequency: Biannual
- Open access: Yes
- License: CC BY-NC-ND 2.0

Standard abbreviations
- ISO 4: Prague Pap. Hist. Int. Relat.

Indexing
- ISSN: 1803-7356 (print); 2336-7105 (web)
- LCCN: 2004255137
- OCLC no.: 54978912

Links
- Journal homepage; Online archive

The Prague Papers on the History of International Relations is a biannual peer-reviewed academic journal published on behalf of the Institute of World History (Faculty of Arts, Charles University in Prague) by the Faculty of Arts Press – Charles University. It was established in 1997 and covers the history of international relations. The journal publishes articles in English, French, German, Russian, and Spanish. Since 2006 the journal cooperates with the Institute of East European History (Faculty of Historical and Cultural Sciences, University of Vienna).

== Editors ==
The editors-in-chief are Václav Drška (Institute of World History, Faculty of Arts, Charles University) and Arnold Suppan (Institute of East European History, University of Vienna).

== Abstracting and indexing ==
The journal is abstracted and indexed in EBSCO databases and ERIH PLUS.

== See also ==
- List of history journals
