= Hitler–Beneš–Tito =

2013 non-fiction book by Austrian historian Arnold Suppan

- Cover of the first edition in German
- Author: Arnold Suppan
- Original title: Hitler–Beneš–Tito: Konflikt, Krieg und Völkermord in Ostmittel-und Südosteuropa
- Publisher: ÖAW
- Publication date: 2013
- English publication date: 2019
- ISBN: 3700184107

Hitler–Beneš–Tito: National Conflicts, World Wars, Genocides, Expulsions, and Divided Remembrance in East-Central and Southeastern Europe, 1848–2018 is a book by Austrian historian Arnold Suppan and published by Austrian Academy of Sciences Press. The book was first published in 2013 in German as Hitler–Beneš–Tito: Konflikt, Krieg und Völkermord in Ostmittel-und Südosteuropa. The English translation was published in 2019.

The book got several reviews. It was described as a Standardwerk in Frankfurter Allgemeine Zeitung and hailed a "masterpiece" by Lukáš Novotný in Prague Papers on the History of International Relations.
