= Volksdeutsche =

Title for ethnic Germans in Nazi Germany

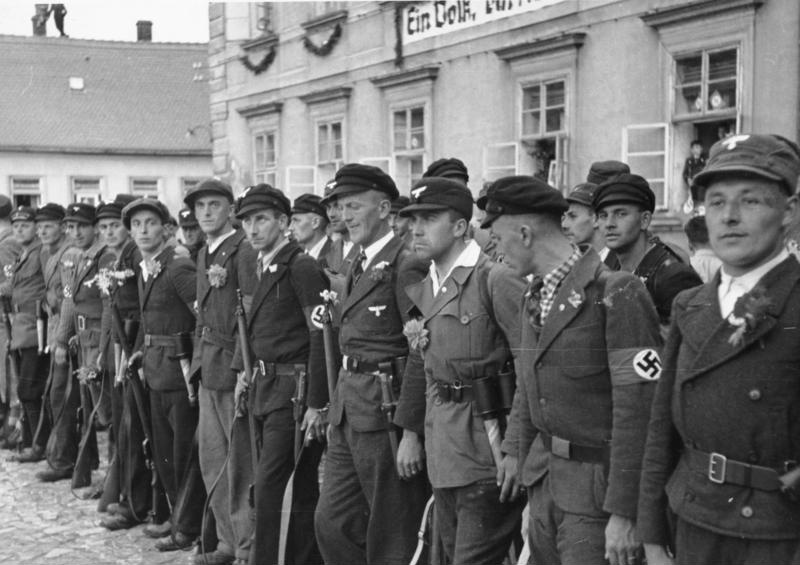
- Volksdeutsche of Sudetendeutsches Freikorps in Czechoslovakia, 1938

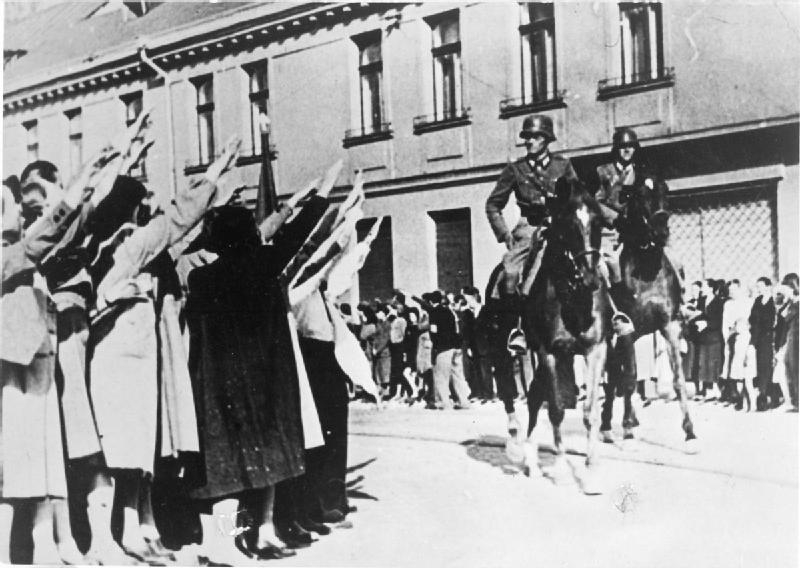
- Volksdeutsche of Łódź greeting German cavalry in 1939

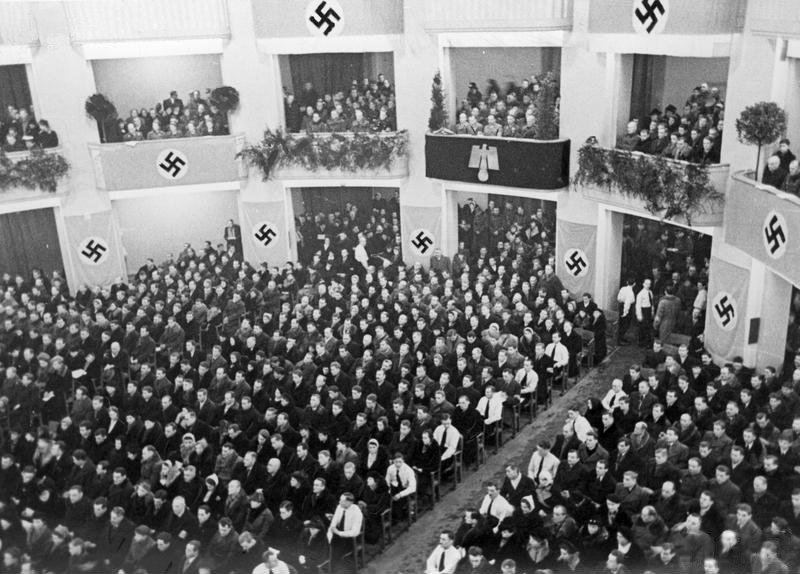
- Volksdeutsche meeting in occupied Warsaw, 1940

In Nazi German terminology, Volksdeutsche (German pronunciation: [ˈfɔlksˌdɔʏtʃə]) were "people whose language and culture had German origins but who did not hold German citizenship." The term is the nominalised plural of volksdeutsch, with Volksdeutsche denoting a singular female, and Volksdeutscher, a singular male. The words Volk and völkisch conveyed the meanings of "folk".

Ethnic Germans living outside Germany shed their identity as Auslandsdeutsche (Germans abroad), and morphed into the Volksdeutsche in a process of self-radicalisation. This process gave the Nazi regime the nucleus around which the new Volksgemeinschaft was established across the German borders.

Volksdeutsche were further divided into "racial" groups – minorities within a state minority – based on special cultural, social, and historic criteria elaborated by the Nazis.

== Origin of the term Volksdeutsche ==
According to the historian Doris Bergen, Adolf Hitler coined the definition of Volksdeutsche which appeared in a 1938 memorandum of the German Reich Chancellery. That document defined Volksdeutsche as "people whose language and culture had German origins but who did not hold German citizenship". After 1945, the Nazi citizenship laws of 1935 (Reichsbürgergesetz) – and the associated regulations that referred to the National Socialist concepts of blood and race in connection with the concept of volksdeutsch – were rescinded in Germany.

For Adolf Hitler and the other ethnic Germans of his time, the term Volksdeutsche also carried overtones of blood and race not captured in the common English translation "ethnic Germans". According to German estimates in the 1930s, about 30 million Volksdeutsche and Auslandsdeutsche (German citizens residing abroad) lived outside the Reich. A significant proportion of them were in Eastern Europe – i.e., Poland, Ukraine, the Baltic states, and Romania, Hungary and Slovakia, where many were located in villages along the Danube and in Russia.

The Nazi goal of expansion assigned the Volksdeutsche a special role in German plans, to bring them back to German citizenship and to elevate them to power over the native populations in those areas. The Nazis detailed such goals in Generalplan Ost. In some areas, such as in Poland, Nazi authorities compiled specific lists and registered people as ethnic Germans in the "Deutsche Volksliste".

== Historical background ==
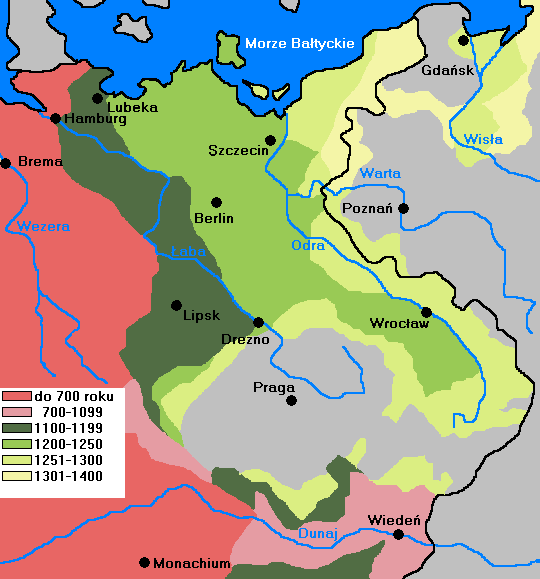
Stages of German eastern settlement, 700–1400

In the sixteenth century Vasili III invited small numbers of craftsmen, traders and professionals to settle in Russia from areas that would later become Germany so that Muscovy could exploit their skills. These settlers (many of whom intended to stay only temporarily) were generally confined to the German Quarter in Moscow (which also included Dutch, British and other western or northern European settlers whom the Russians came to indiscriminately refer to as "Germans"). They were only gradually allowed in other cities, so as to prevent the spread of alien ideas to the general population.

In his youth, Peter the Great spent much time in the 'German' quarter. When he became Tsar, he brought more German experts (and other foreigners) into Russia, and particularly into government service, in his attempts to westernise the empire. He also brought in German engineers to supervise the construction of the new city of Saint Petersburg. Catherine the Great, herself ethnically German, invited Germanic farmers to immigrate and settle in Russian lands along the Volga River. She guaranteed them the right to retain their language, religion and culture.

Also in other areas with an ethnic German minority people of other than German descent assimilated with the ethnic German culture and formed then a part of the minority. Examples are people of Baltic and Scandinavian descent, who assimilated into the minority of the Baltic Germans. Jews of Posen province, Galicia, Bukovina and Bohemia, with their Yiddish culture derived in part from their German heritage, often mingled into the ethnic German culture, thus forming part of the various ethnic German minorities. But anti-Semitic Nazis later rejected Jewish ethnic Germans and all Jewish German citizens as "racially" German.

Ethnic Germans were also sent in organised colonisation attempts aiming at Germanisation of conquered Polish areas. Frederick the Great (reigned 1740–1786) settled around 300,000 colonists in the eastern provinces of Prussia, acquired in the First Partition of Poland of 1772, with the intention of replacing the Polish nobility. He treated the Poles with contempt and likened the "slovenly Polish trash" in newly occupied West Prussia to Iroquois, the historic Native American confederacy based in what is now the state of New York.

Prussia encouraged a second round of colonisation with the goal of Germanisation after 1832. Prussia passed laws to encourage Germanisation of the Prussian Partition including the provinces of Posen and West Prussia in the late 19th century. The Prussian Settlement Commission relocated 154,000 colonists, including locals.

=== Treaty of Versailles ===
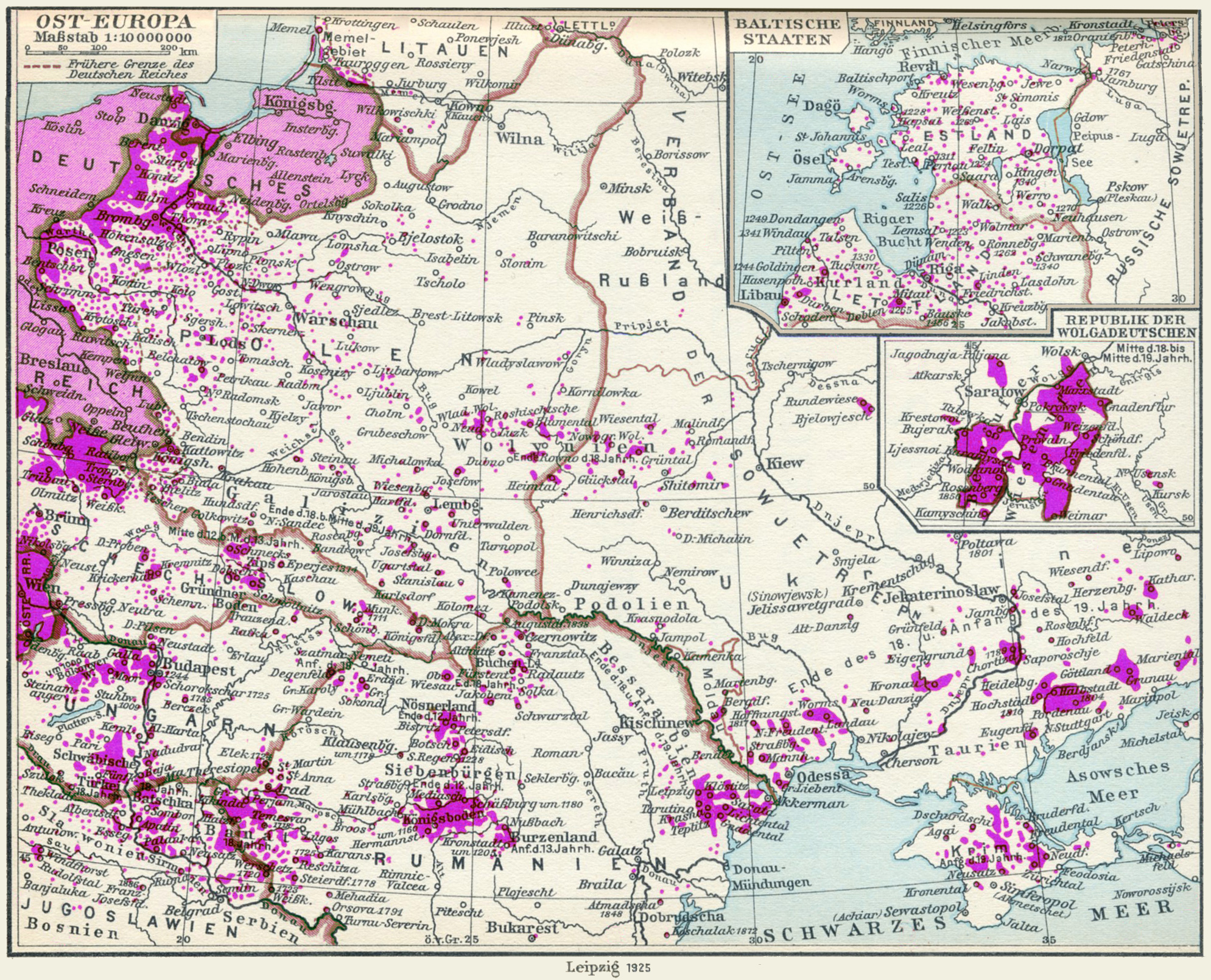
Distribution of the German population in 1910 on the map of countries existing in 1925 in Central and Eastern Europe

The reconstitution of Poland following the Treaty of Versailles (1919) made ethnic German minorities of some Prussian provinces of the German Empire citizens of the Polish nation state. Ethnic German inhabitants of provinces of the dissolved Austro-Hungarian Empire, such as Bukovina Germans, Danube Swabians, Sudeten Germans and Transylvanian Saxons, became citizens of newly established Slavic or Magyar nation-states and of Romania. Tensions between the new administration and the ethnic German minority arose in the Polish Corridor. The Austrian Germans also found themselves not allowed to join Germany as German Austria was strictly forbidden to join Germany. In addition, the name "German Austria" was forbidden, so the name was changed back to just "Austria" and the First Austrian Republic was created in 1919.

== The Nazi era before World War II ==
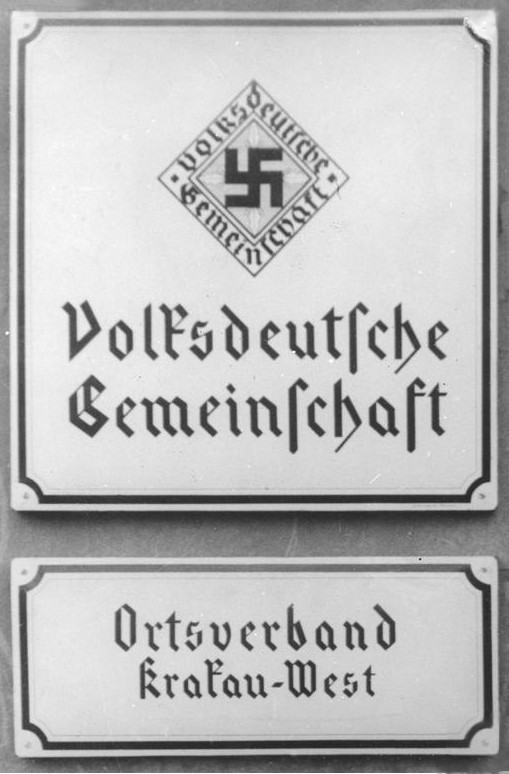
Entry to Volksdeutsche office in Kraków, 1940

During the Nazi years, the German Nazis used the term Volksdeutsche, by which they meant racially German since they believed in a German 'race' or 'Volk', to refer to foreign nationals of some German ethnicity living in countries newly occupied by Nazi Germany or the Soviet Union. Prior to World War II, more than 10 million ethnic Germans lived in Central and Eastern Europe. They constituted an important minority far into Russia. Because of widespread assimilation some people whom the Nazis called Volksdeutsche could no longer speak German and in fact were culturally regionalized as Poles, Hungarians, Romanians, Czechs, Slovaks, etc.

=== Pre-war relations with the Nazis ===
In 1931, prior to its rise to power, the Nazi party established the Auslandsorganisation der NSDAP/AO (Foreign Organisation of the Nazi Party), whose task it was to disseminate Nazi propaganda among the ethnic German minorities viewed as Volksdeutsche in Nazi ideology. In 1936, the government set up the Volksdeutsche Mittelstelle (Ethnic Germans' Liaison Office), commonly known as VoMi, under the jurisdiction of the SS as the liaison bureau. It was headed by SS-Obergruppenführer Werner Lorenz.

According to the historian Valdis Lumans,

"[one of Himmler's goals was] centralising control over the myriad of groups and individuals inside the Reich promoting the Volksdeutsche cause. Himmler did not initiate the process but rather discovered it in progress and directed it to its conclusion and to his advantage. His principal instrument in this effort was an office from outside the SS, a Nazi party organ, the Volksdeutsche Mittelstelle (VoMi), translated as the Ethnic German Liaison Office."

=== Internal propaganda ===
Nazi propaganda used the existence of ethnic Germans who they called Volksdeutsche in foreign lands before and during the war, to help justify the aggression of Nazi Germany. The annexation of Poland was presented as necessary to protect the ethnic German minorities there. Massacres of ethnic Germans, such as Bloody Sunday, or alleged atrocities, were used in such propaganda, and the film Heimkehr drew on such putative events as the rescue of Volksdeutsche by the arrival of German tanks. Heimkehr's introduction explicitly states that hundreds of thousands of Poles of German ethnicity suffered as the characters in the film did.

Menschen im Sturm reprised "Heimkehr"'s effort to justify the invasion of Slavonia, using many of the same atrocities. In The Red Terror, a Baltic German is able to avenge her family's deaths, but commits suicide after, unable to live with meaning in the Soviet Union. Flüchtlinge depicted the sufferings of Volga German refugees in Manchuria, and how a heroic blond leader saved them; it was the first movie to win the state prize. Frisians in Peril depicted the suffering of a village of Volga Germans in the Soviet Union; it also depicted the murder of a young woman for an affair with a Russian – in accordance with Nazi principle of Rassenschande – as an ancient German custom.

Sexual contact between what the Nazis viewed as different 'races' followed by remorse and guilt was also featured in Die goldene Stadt, where the Sudeten German heroine faces not persecution but the allure of the big city; when she succumbs, in defiance of blood and soil, she is seduced and abandoned by a Czech, and such a relationship leads to her drowning herself.

=== Collaboration with the Nazis ===
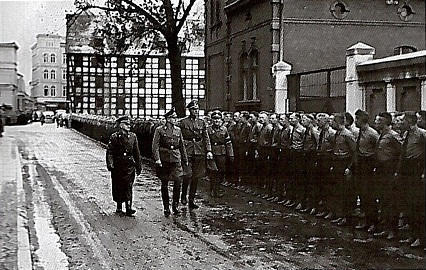
Volksdeutscher Selbstschutz in Bydgoszcz (Bromberg), 1939

Before and during World War II, some ethnic Germans gathered around local Nazi organizations (sponsored financially by the German Foreign Office), actively supported the Nazis in countries such as Czechoslovakia, Poland and Yugoslavia. During the social and economic tensions of the Great Depression, some had begun to feel aggrieved with their minority status. They participated in espionage, sabotage and other fifth column means in their countries of origin, trained and commanded by the Abwehr. In November 1938 Nazi Germany organized German paramilitary units made out German minority members in Polish Pomerania that were to engage in diversion, sabotage as well as political murder and ethnic cleansing upon German invasion of Poland.

Reich intelligence actively recruited ethnic Germans, and the Nazi secret service SicherheitsDienst (SD) formed them as early as October 1938 into armed unit that were to serve Nazi Germany.

Historian Matthias Fiedler typified ethnic German collaborationists as former "nobodies" whose major occupation was the expropriation of Jewish property. Heinrich Himmler remarked that whatever objections ethnic Germans might have against serving in the Waffen-SS, they would be conscripted in any case. According to head of recruitment for the Waffen SS, Gottlob Berger, no one in Germany or elsewhere cared for what happened to the ethnic Germans anyway, which made recruitment easy forced upon ethnic German communities.

Among the indigenous populations in the Nazi-occupied lands, Volksdeutsche became a term of ignominy.

During the early years of the Second World War, before the US entered the war, a small number of Americans of German origin returned to Germany; generally they were immigrants or children of immigrants, rather than descendants of migrations more distant in time. Some of these enlisted and fought in the German army.

== During World War II ==
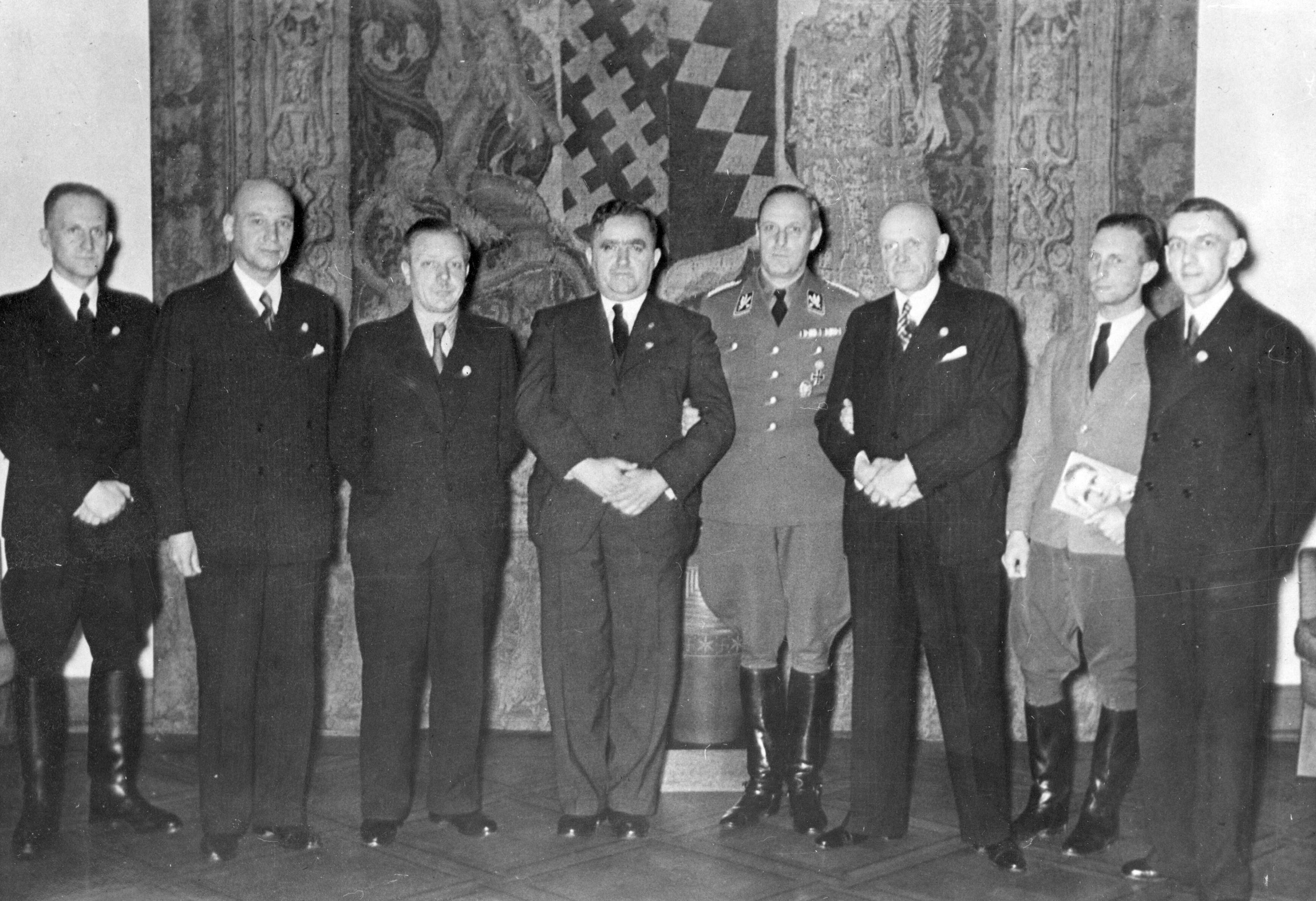
Poles of German ethnicity decorated with the Golden Party Badge by Adolf Hitler in Berlin after Invasion of Poland in 1939. From left: Ludwig Wolff head of Deutscher Volksverband from Łódź, Otto Ulitz from Katowice, Gauleiter Josef Wagner, Mayor Rudolf Wiesner from Bielsko-Biała, Obergruppenführer Werner Lorenz, senator Erwin Hasbach from Ciechocinek, Gero von Gersdorff from Wielkopolska, Weiss from Jarocin

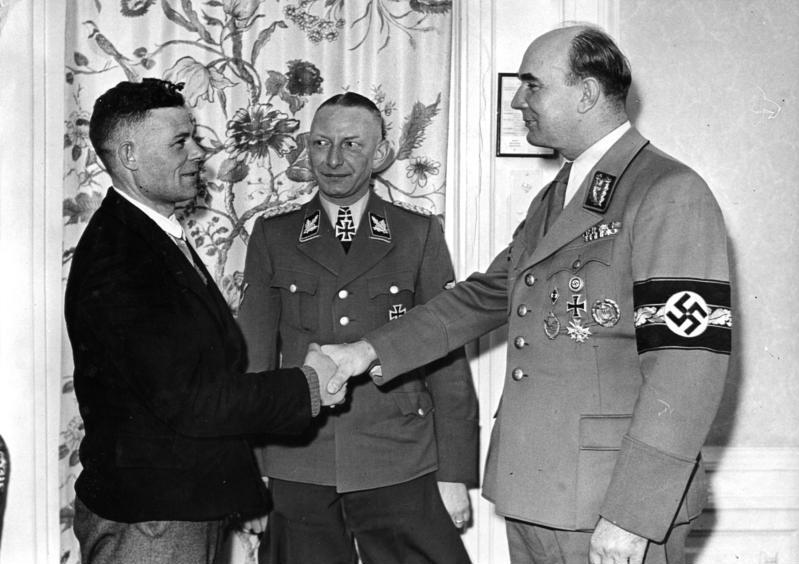
Arthur Greiser welcoming the millionth resettler of German ethnicity during the "Heim ins Reich" action from Central and Eastern Europe to occupied Poland – March 1944

Ethnic Germans throughout Europe benefited financially during World War II from the Nazi policies of genocide and ethnic cleansing, and profited from the expulsion and murder of their non-German neighbors throughout Eastern Europe. For example, in Ukraine the Volksdeutsche directly participated in the Holocaust and were involved in deportation of local farmers and their families; Volksdeutsche figures like Arthur Boss from Odessa (Blobel's right-hand man) or the Becker brothers became an integral part of the Nazi Holocaust machine.

=== 'Volksdeutsche' in German-occupied western Poland ===
In September 1939 in German occupied Poland, an armed ethnic German militia called Selbstschutz (Self-Defence) was created. It organised the mass murder of Polish elites in Operation Tannenberg. At the beginning of 1940, the Selbstschutz organization was disbanded, and its members transferred to various units of the SS, Gestapo and the German police. Throughout the invasion of Poland, some ethnic German minority groups assisted Nazi Germany in the war effort: they committed sabotage, diverted regular forces and committed numerous atrocities against civilian population.

After Germany occupied western Poland, it established a central registration bureau, called the German People's List (Deutsche Volksliste, DVL), whereby Poles of German ethnicity were registered as Volksdeutsche. The German occupants encouraged such registration, in many cases forcing it or subjecting Poles of German ethnicity to terror assaults if they refused. Those who joined this group were given benefits including better food, as well as a better social status.

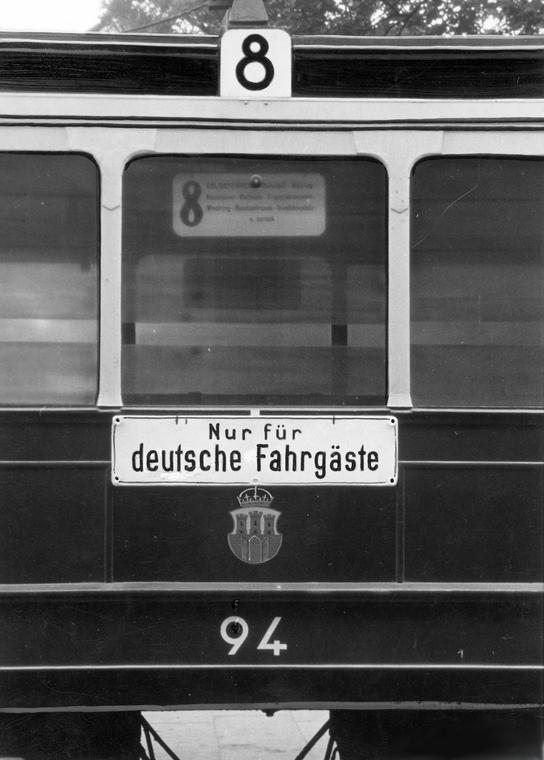
Nur für deutsche Fahrgäste (Eng. "Only for German passengers") on the tram number 8 in occupied Kraków

The Volksdeutsche Mittelstelle organised large-scale looting of property and redistributed goods to the Volksdeutsche. They were given apartments, workshops, farms, furniture, and clothing confiscated from Jews and Poles. In turn, hundreds of thousands of the Volksdeutsche joined the German forces, either willingly or under compulsion.

During World War II, the Polish citizens of German ancestry that identified with the Polish nation faced the dilemma whether to register in the Deutsche Volksliste. Many families had lived in Poland for centuries and more-recent immigrants had arrived over 30 years before the war. They faced the choice of registering and being regarded as traitors by the Poles, or not signing and being treated by the Nazi occupation as traitors to the Germanic race. Polish Silesian Catholic Church authorities, led by bishop Stanisław Adamski and with agreement from the Polish Government in Exile, advised Poles to sign up to the Volksliste in order to avoid atrocities and mass murder that happened in other parts of the country.

In occupied Poland, Volksdeutscher enjoyed privileges and were subject to conscription, or draft, into the German army. In occupied Pomerania, the Gauleiter of the Danzig-West Prussia region Albert Forster ordered a list of people considered of German ethnicity to be made in 1941. Due to insignificant voluntary registrations by February 1942, Forster made signing the Volksliste mandatory and empowered local authorities to use force and threats to implement the decree. Consequently, the number of signatories rose to almost a million, or about 55% of the 1944 population.

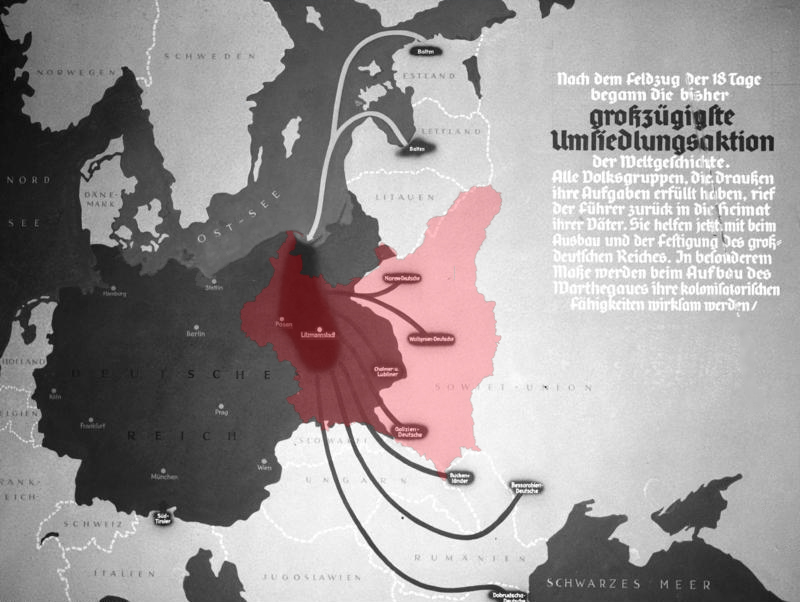
Origin of ethnic German colonisers, resettled into German-annexed and occupied Poland during Heim ins Reich action. Poster superimposed with the red outline of Poland missing from the original print

The special case of Polish Pomerania, where terror against civilians was particularly intense, and where, unlike in rest of occupied Poland, signing of the list was mandatory for many people, was recognised by the Polish Underground State and other anti-Nazi resistance movements, which tried to explain the situation to other Poles in underground publications.

The Deutsche Volksliste categorised non-Jewish Poles of German ethnicity into one of four categories:

- Category I: Persons of German descent committed to the Reich before 1939.
- Category II: Persons of German descent who had remained passive.
- Category III: Persons of German descent who had become partly "Polonised", e.g., through marrying a Polish partner or through working relationships (especially Silesians and Kashubians).
- Category IV: Persons of German ancestry who had become "Polonised" but were supportive of "Germanisation".

Volksdeutsche of statuses 1 and 2 in the Polish areas annexed by Germany numbered 1 million, and Nos. 3 and 4 numbered 1.7 million. In the General Government there were 120,000 Volksdeutsche. Volksdeutsche of Polish ethnic origins were treated by the Poles with special contempt.

Annexed area	Deutsche Volksliste, early 1944			
Annexed area	Cat. I	Cat. II	Cat. III	Cat. IV
Warthegau	230,000	190,000	65,000	25,000
Reichsgau Danzig-West Prussia; Note: In Polish Pomerania, unlike in the rest of occupied Poland, signing of the list was mandatory for a good portion of the population.	115,000	95,000	725,000	2,000
East Upper Silesia	130,000	210,000	875,000	55,000
South East Prussia	9,000	22,000	13,000	1,000
Total	484,000	517,000	1,678,000	83,000
Total	Total 2.75 million on Volkslisten plus non-German population (Polish) of 6.015 million – Grand Total 8.765 million in annexed territories.			
Source: Wilhelm Deist, Bernhard R. Kroener, Germany (Federal Republic). Militärgeschichtliches Forschungsamt, Germany and the Second World War, Oxford University Press, 2003, pp. 132, 133, ISBN 0-19-820873-1, citing Broszat, Nationalsozialistische Polenpolitik, p. 134

Because of actions by some Volksdeutsche and particularly the atrocities committed by Nazi Germany, after the end of the war, the Polish authorities tried many Volksdeutsche for high treason. In the postwar period, many other ethnic Germans were expelled to the west and forced to leave everything. In post-war Poland, the word Volksdeutsche is regarded as an insult, synonymous with "traitor".

In some cases, individuals consulted the Polish resistance first, before signing the Volksliste. There were Volksdeutsche who played important roles in intelligence activities of the Polish resistance, and were at times the primary source of information for the Allies. Particularly in Polish Pomerania and Polish Silesia, many of the people who were forced to sign the Volksliste played crucial roles in the anti-Nazi underground, which was noted in a memo to the Polish Government in Exile which stated "In Wielkopolska there's bitter hatred of the Volksdeutsche while in Silesia and Polish Pomerania it's the opposite, the secret organization depends in large measure on the Volksdeutsche" (the memo referred to those of Category III, not I and II). In the turmoil of the postwar years, the Communist government did not consider this sufficient mitigation. It prosecuted many double-agent Volksdeutsche and sentenced some to death.

=== Volksdeutsche in the territories annexed by the Soviet Union in 1939–1940 ===
The secret protocols of Molotov–Ribbentrop Pact created domestic problems for Hitler. Supporting the Soviet invasion became one of the most ideologically difficult aspects of the countries' relationship. The secret protocols caused Hitler to hurriedly evacuate ethnic German families, who had lived in the Baltic countries for centuries and now classified as Volksdeutsche, while officially condoning the invasions. When the three Baltic countries, not knowing about the secret protocols, sent letters protesting the Soviet invasions to Berlin, Ribbentrop returned them.

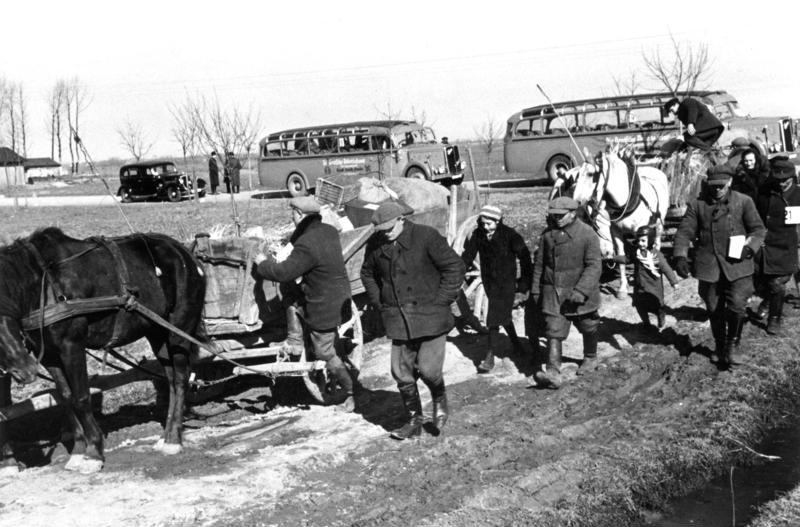
Volksdeutsche resettling after the Soviet occupation of Eastern Poland

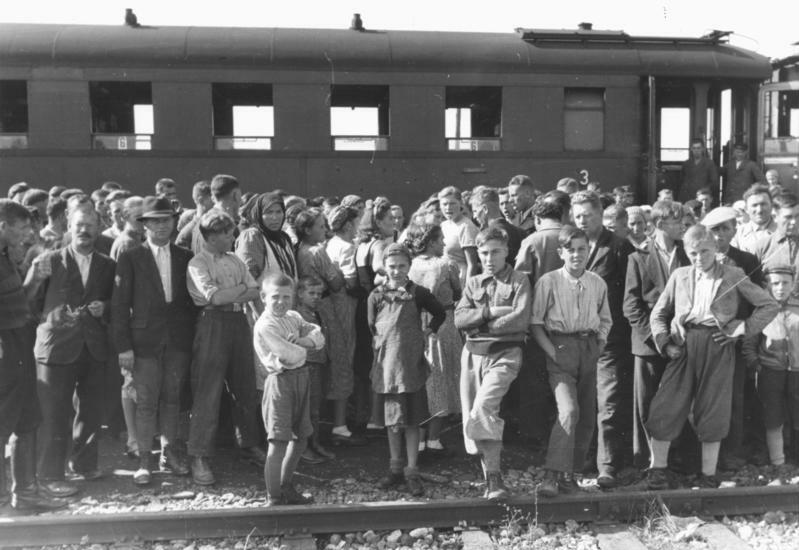
Volkdeutsche resettling after the Soviet occupation of Bukovina and Bessarabia in 1940

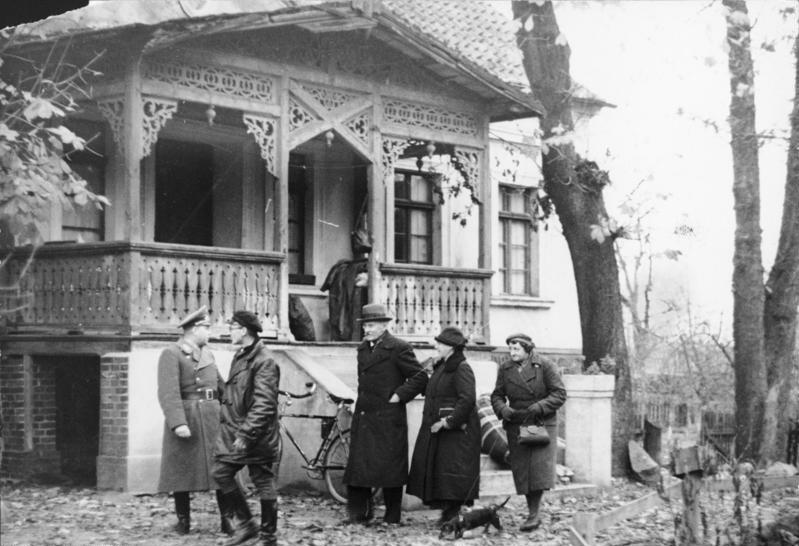
Resettled Baltic Germans take possession of empty homes in Warthegau after their forced abandonment by the legitimate Polish owners.

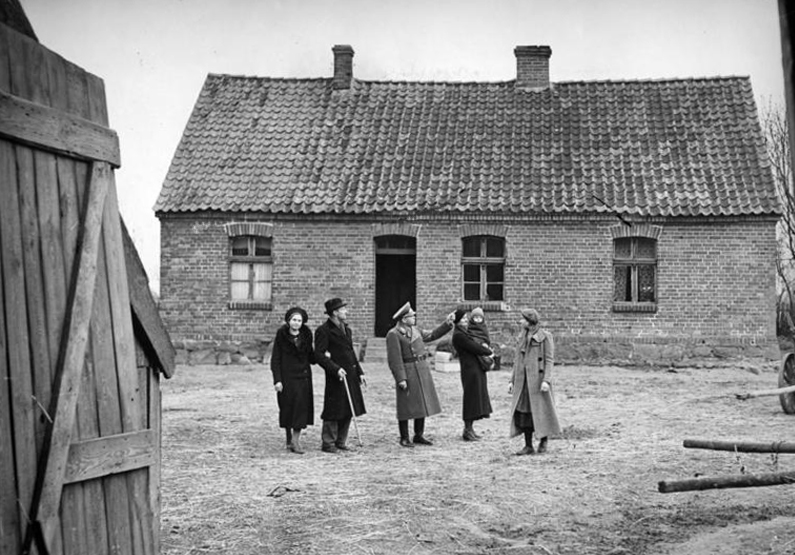
Baltic German settlers are shown their new possession in occupied Poland in November 1939.

In August 1940, Soviet Foreign minister Molotov told the Germans that, with the government change, they could close down their Baltic consulates by September 1. The Soviet annexations in Romania caused further strain. While Germany had given the Soviets Bessarabia in the secret protocols, it had not given them North Bukovina. Germany wanted guarantees of the safety of property of ethnic Germans, security for the 125,000 Volksdeutsche in Bessarabia and North Bukovina, and reassurance that the train tracks carrying Romanian oil would be left alone.

In October 1940, Germany and the Soviet Union negotiated about the Volksdeutsche in Soviet-occupied territories and their property. Instead of permitting full indemnification, the Soviets put restrictions on the wealth that the Volksdeutsche could take with them and limited the totals that the Soviets would apply to the Reich's clearing accounts. The parties discussed total compensation of between 200 million ℛ︁ℳ︁ and 350 million ℛ︁ℳ︁ for the Volksdeutsche, while the Soviets requested 50 million ℛ︁ℳ︁ for their property claims in German-occupied territories. The two nations reached general agreement on German shipments of 10.5-cm flak cannons, gold, machinery and other items.

On 10 January 1941, Germany and the Soviet Union signed the German–Soviet Border and Commercial Agreement to settle all of the open disputes which the Soviets had argued. The agreement covered protected migration to Germany within two and a half months of Volksdeutsche, and similar migration to the Soviet Union of ethnic Russians, Baltic and "White Russian" "nationals" from German-held territories. In many cases, the resulting population transfers resulted in resettlement of Volksdeutsche on land previously held by ethnic Poles or Jews in now German-occupied territories. The agreement formally defined the border between Germany and the Soviet Union areas between the Igorka River and the Baltic Sea.

Heim ins Reich 1939–1944
Territory of origin	Year	Number of resettled Volksdeutsche
South Tyrol (see South Tyrol Option Agreement)	1939–1940	83,000
Latvia and Estonia	1939–1941	69,000
Lithuania	1941	54,000
Volhynia, Galicia, Nerewdeutschland	1939–1940	128,000
General Government	1940	33,000
North Bukovina and Bessarabia	1940	137,000
Romania (South Bukovina and North Dobruja)	1940	77,000
Yugoslavia	1941–1942	36,000
USSR (pre-1939 borders)	1939–1944	250,000
Summary	1939–1944	867,000

=== After the German invasion of the USSR ===
After the Russian Revolution of 1917, the government granted the Volga Germans an autonomous republic. Joseph Stalin abolished the Volga German ASSR after Operation Barbarossa, the German invasion of the USSR. Most of Soviet Germans in the USSR were deported to Siberia, Kazakhstan, and Central Asia by Decree of the Supreme Soviet of the USSR of August 28, 1941, and from the beginning of 1942 those Soviet Germans who were deemed suitable for hard work (men aged from 15 to 55 and women from 16 to 45) were mobilised for forced labour into Working columns where they lived in a prison-like environment, and sometimes, together with regular inmates, were put in prison camps. Hundreds of thousands died or became incapacitated due to the harsh conditions.

=== Volksdeutsche in Hungary ===
A significant portion of Volksdeutsche in Hungary joined the SS, which was a pattern repeated also in Romania (with 54,000 locals serving in the SS by the end of 1943). The majority of 200,000 Volksdeutsche from the area of Danube who served with the SS were from Hungary. As early as 1942, some 18,000 Hungarian Germans joined the SS. they have been called Danube Swabians. After World War II, approximately 185,000 Volksdeutsche in the Volksbund fled from the region. They were called 'Svabo' by their Serbian, Hungarian, Croatian, and Romanian neighbors. Most of the Danube Swabians who were not members in the so-called Volksbund were expelled to Allied-occupied Germany and Allied-occupied Austria in 1946–1948, following the Potsdam Agreement.

=== Volksdeutsche in Romania ===
After Romania acquired parts of Soviet Ukraine, the Germans there came under the authority of the Volksdeutsche Mittelstelle, which deployed SS personnel to several settlements. They eventually contained German mayors, farms, schools and ethnic German paramilitary groups functioning as police called Selbstschutz ("Self-protection"). German colonists and Selbstschutz forces engaged in extensive acts of ethnic cleansing, massacring Jewish and Roma populations.

In the German colony of Shonfeld, Romas were burned in farms. During the winter of 1941/1942, German Selbstschutz units participated in the shooting, together with Ukrainian People's Militia and Romanian gendarmes, of some 18,000 Jews. In the camp of Bogdanovka, tens of thousands of Jews were subject to mass shootings, barn burnings and killing by hand grenades.

Heinrich Himmler was sufficiently impressed by the Volksdeutsche communities and the work of the Selbstschutz to order that these methods be copied in Ukraine.

=== Volksdeutsche in Serbia and Croatia ===
In the former Yugoslavia, the 7th SS Volunteer Mountain Division Prinz Eugen was formed with about 50,000 ethnic Germans from the Banat region of Serbia. It was conspicuous in its operations against the Yugoslav Partisans and civilian population. About 100,000 ethnic Germans from the Nazi-conquered former Yugoslavia joined the German Wehrmacht and Waffen-SS, the majority conscripted involuntarily as judged by the Nuremberg trials. Yet

"[a]fter the initial rush of Volksdeutsche to join, voluntary enlistments tapered off, and the new unit did not reach division size. Therefore, in August 1941, the SS discarded the voluntary approach, and after a favourable judgement from the SS court in Belgrade, imposed a mandatory military obligation on all Volksdeutsche in Serbia-Banat, the first of its kind for non-Reich Germans."

In the former Yugoslavia a majority of ethnic Germans became members of the Schwäbisch-Deutscher Kulturbund (Swabian German Cultural Association), and reprisals on this group by Tito's partisans resulted in many immediate revenge killings in 1944 and incarceration of approximately 150,000 ethnic Germans in 1945.

== Expulsion and exodus from Central and Eastern Europe at the end of the war ==
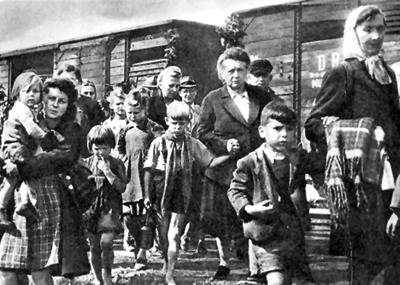
Sudeten Germans expelled after World War II

Most ethnic Germans fled or were expelled from European countries (Czechoslovakia, Poland and Hungary) under the Potsdam Agreement from 1945 to 1948 towards the end and after the war. Those who became ethnic Germans, by registering in the Deutsche Volksliste and Reichsdeutsche, retained German citizenship during the years of Allied military occupation. Citizenship was further retained after the establishment of East Germany and West Germany in 1949, and later in the reunified Germany. In 1953 the Federal Republic of Germany – by its Federal Expellee Law – naturalised many more East European nationals of German ethnicity, who were neither German citizens nor had enrolled in any 'Volksliste', but had been stranded as refugees in West Germany and fled or were expelled due to their German or alleged German ethnicity.

An estimated 12 million people fled or were expelled from the Soviet Union and non-German-speaking Central Europe, many of them being Volksdeutsche. Most left the Soviet-occupied territories of Central and Eastern Europe; they comprised the largest migration of any European people in modern history. The then three Allies had agreed to the expulsions during negotiations in the midst of war. The western powers hoped to avoid ethnic Germans being an issue again in Central and Eastern Europe. The three Allies at the Conference of Potsdam considered the "transfer" of "German populations" from Czechoslovakia, Poland and Hungary an effort to be undertaken (see article 12 of the Potsdam Agreement), although they asked a halt because of the inflicted burden for the Allies to feed and house the destitute expellees and to share that burden among the Allies. France, which was not represented in Potsdam, rejected the decision of the Three of Potsdam and did not absorb expellees in its zone of occupation. The three Allies had to accept the reality on the ground, since expulsions of Volksdeutsche and Central and Eastern European nationals of German or alleged German ethnicity who never had enrolled as Volksdeutsche, were going on already.

Local authorities forced most of the remaining ethnic Germans to leave between 1945 and 1950. Remnants of the ethnic German community survive in the former Soviet republics of Central Asia. A significant ethnic German community has continued in Siebenbürgen (Transylvania) in Romania and in Oberschlesien (Upper Silesia) but most of it migrated to West Germany throughout the 1980s. There are also remnant German populations near Mukachevo in western Ukraine.

== Legacy ==
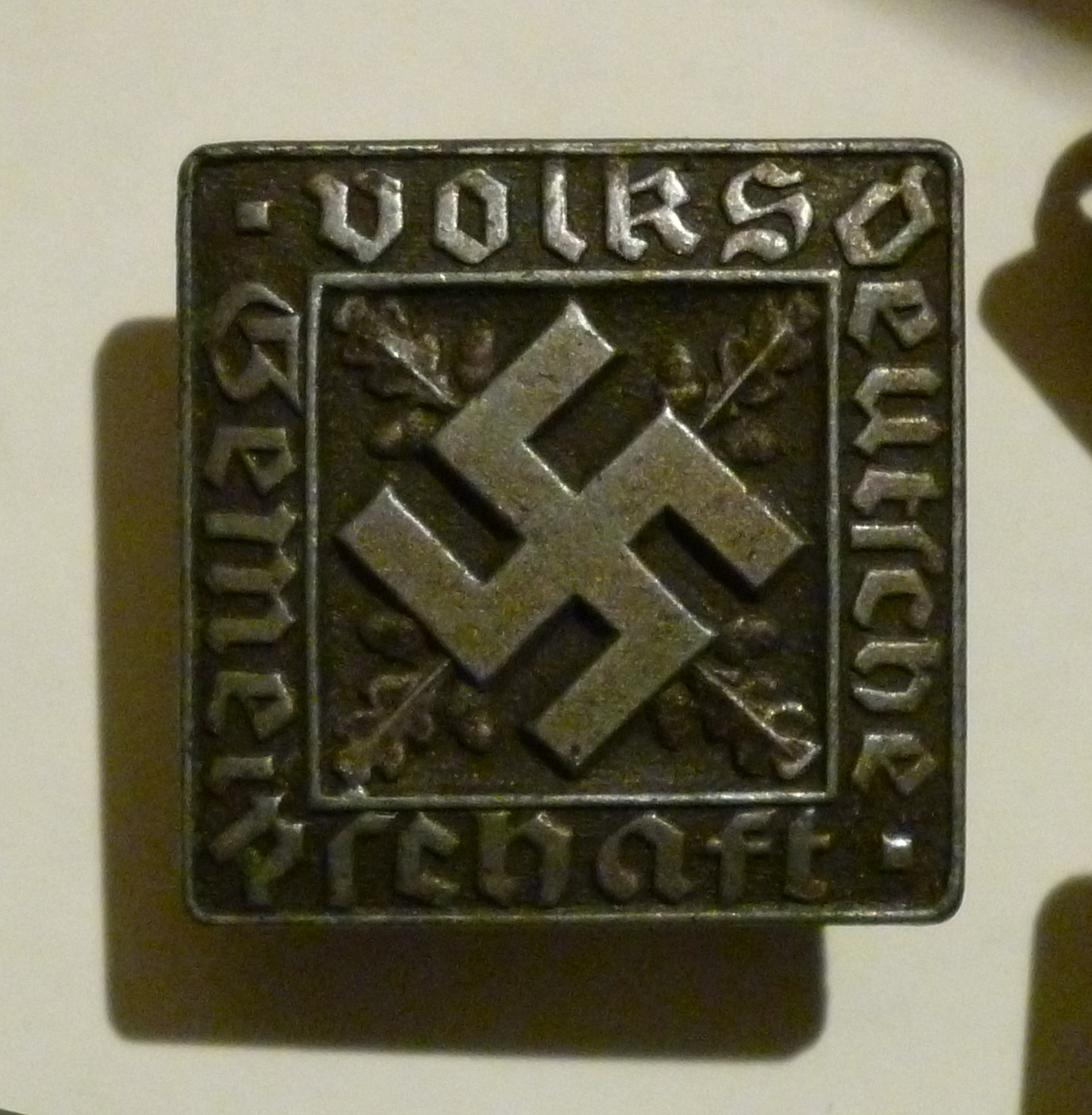
Badge worn by Volksdeutsche

The term Volksdeutsche is generally avoided today due to its usage by the Nazis.

Instead, ethnic Germans of foreign citizenship living outside Germany are called Deutsche Minderheit (meaning "German minority"), or names more closely associated with their earlier places of residence, such as Wolgadeutsche or Volga Germans, the ethnic Germans living in the Volga basin in Russia; and Baltic Germans, who generally called themselves Balts, and Estländer in Estonia. They were relocated to German-occupied Poland during World War II by an agreement between Adolf Hitler and Joseph Stalin, and most were expelled to the West after the war, under the Potsdam Agreement.

== See also ==
- Areas annexed by Nazi Germany
- German nationality law
- Goralenvolk
- Selbstschutz
- Imperial Germans, for a discussion of the different concepts and the shift of meaning between them.
- Fifth column
- Heimatvertriebene
- Umvolkung
- Flight and expulsion of Germans (1944–1950)
- Demographic estimates of the flight and expulsion of Germans
- World War II evacuation and expulsion
- Pursuit of Nazi collaborators
- Nur für Deutsche
- Brandenburgers
