= Arnold Suppan =

Austrian historian (born 1945)

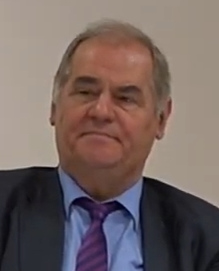
- Suppan at the Collegium Hungaricum in Vienna, 2018
- Born: 18 August 1945 (age 81); St. Veit an der Glan, Republic of Austria
- Occupation: Historian
- Awards: Austrian Decoration for Science and Art; Leopold Kunschak Prize

Academic background
- Education: University of Vienna
- Thesis: (1970)
- Doctoral advisor: Richard G. Plaschka; Erich Zöllner

Academic work
- Discipline: History
- Sub-discipline: Modern history
- Main interests: Austria-Hungary; Kingdom of Croatia; Kingdom of Yugoslavia
- Notable works: Hitler–Beneš–Tito
- Website: Arnold Suppan publications on Academia.edu

Arnold Suppan (born 18 August 1945 in St. Veit an der Glan) is an Austrian historian who studies Eastern Europe in the twentieth century. He is a faculty member at Andrássy University Budapest and University of Vienna. He was secretary-general of the Austrian Academy of Sciences from 2009–2011 and vice president from 2011–2013. He was director of the Institute for Eastern European History at the University of Vienna since 2002.

== Works ==
- Suppan, Arnold (2019). Hitler–Beneš–Tito: National Conflicts, World Wars, Genocides, Expulsions, and Divided Remembrance in East-Central and Southeastern Europe, 1848–2018. Vienna: Austrian Academy of Sciences Press. ISBN 978-3-7001-8410-2. JSTOR j.ctvvh867x.
