= Transylvanian Saxons =

German minority of Transylvania, Romania

Siebenbürger Sachsen (German) Siweberjer Såksen (Transylvanian Saxon) Sași transilvăneni (Romanian) (Note: or Sași transilvani) erdélyi szászok (Hungarian)

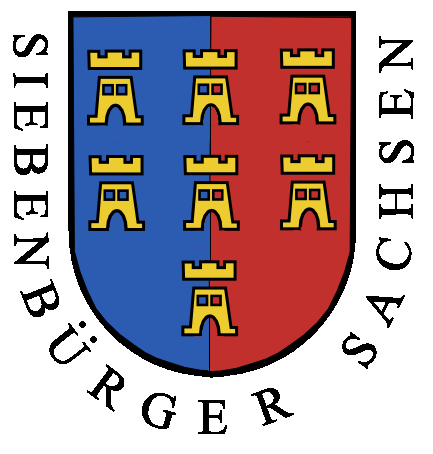
- Flag of the Transylvanian Saxons and the coat of arms of the Transylvanian Saxon University (Latin: Universitas Saxonum) during the Middle Ages in Romania

Total population
- c. 11,400–c. 300,000

Regions with significant populations
- Romania (mainly Transylvania) Counties: Sibiu County (German: Kreis Hermannstadt); Brașov County (German: Kreis Kronstadt); Mureș County (German: Kreis Mieresch); Hunedoara County (German: Kreis Eisenmarkt); Bistrița-Năsăud County (German: Kreis Bistritz-Nassod); Alba County (German: Kreis Karlsburg): c. 11,400–c. 13,000 (2011)

Languages
- Predominantly spoken languages: German (Standard German and the Transylvanian Saxon dialect; also Romanian and Hungarian)

Religion
- Lutheran majority with Reformed, Roman Catholic, and Unitarian minorities; initially staunchly Roman Catholic until the Reformation

Related ethnic groups
- Luxembourgers, Germans, German diaspora, Flemings, Walloons, English people, and Austrians
- Lived since the High Middle Ages onwards in Transylvania as well as in other parts of contemporary Romania. Additionally, the Transylvanian Saxons are the eldest ethnic German group in non-native majority German-inhabited Central-Eastern Europe, alongside the Zipsers in Slovakia and Romania (who began to settle in present-day Slovakia starting in the 13th century).

The Transylvanian Saxons are a Germanic people who settled in Transylvania in various waves from the 12th-century Ostsiedlung to the mid-19th century. They were mostly Luxembourgish, from the Low Countries as well as Alsace in modern day France, but also from other parts of present-day Germany.

The first ancestors of the Transylvanian 'Saxons' originally stemmed from Flanders, Hainaut, Brabant, Liège, Zeeland, Moselle, Lorraine, and Luxembourg, then situated in the north-western territories of the Holy Roman Empire around the 1140s and 1150s.

Alongside the Baltic Germans from Estonia and Latvia and the Zipser Germans (also sometimes known or referred to as Zipser Saxons) from Zips, northeastern Slovakia, as well as Maramureș and Bucovina, the Transylvanian Saxons are one of the three eldest German-speaking and ethnic German groups of the German diaspora in Central-Eastern Europe, having continuously been living there since the High Middle Ages onwards. The Transylvanian Saxons are part of the broader group of Romanian Germans as well, being the eldest of all the constituent sub-groups of this ethnic community.

Their native dialect, Transylvanian Saxon, is close to Luxembourgish. Nowadays, organisations representing the Transylvanian Saxons exist in Romania, Germany, Austria, Canada, and the United States (in the latter case most notably 'Alliance of Transylvanian Saxons'). Other smaller communities of Transylvanian Saxons can be found in South Africa and Australia as well as South America (for example in Argentina).

== Name ==
Although most Transylvanian Saxons did not descend from the medieval Saxons, the latter name was historically often used pars pro toto to describe any Germanic peoples. In the vicinity of Transylvania —Romania, Hungary, and Moldova— the Transylvanian Saxons are usually called simply "Saxons", with "Transylvanian" taken for granted. Names for (Transylvanian) Saxons in local languages include:

- Transylvanian Saxon: (Siweberjer) Såksen or Soxen (singular Sox or Soax)
- Transylvanian Landler: Soxn or Soxisch
- German: (Siebenbürger) Sachsen
- Romanian: sași (ardeleni/transilvăneni/transilvani)
- Hungarian: (erdélyi) szászok
- Bulgarian: Саси

== Historical overview ==
=== Origin, status, impact ===
The coat of arms of the Teutonic Order which helped and defended the Transylvanian Saxons during their early settlement process in Transylvania, namely in the early part of the 13th century.

The legal foundation of their settlement in southern, southeastern, and northeastern Transylvania was officially stipulated within the Diploma Andreanum (German: Der Goldene Freibrief der Siebenbürger Sachsen, The Golden Charter of the Transylvanian Saxons, Romanian: Bula de aur a sașilor transilvăneni) issued by King Andrew II of Hungary, which allocated them a territory to be held under their own local autonomy, known as Königsboden in German or Fundus Regius in Latin lit. "royal land" (Romanian: Pământul crăiesc or Pământul regal).

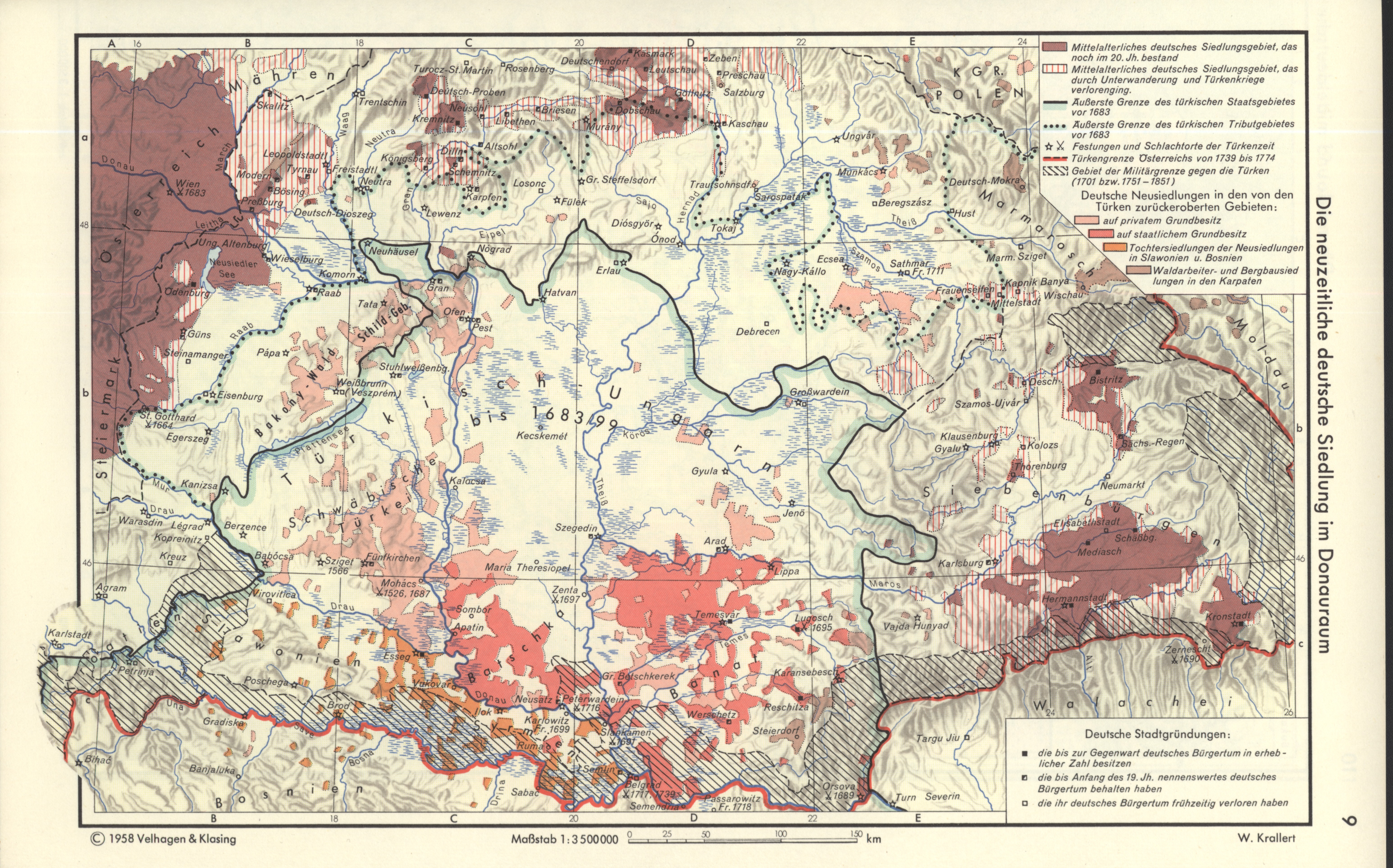
German-language map depicting areas colonised by ethnic German in the former Kingdom of Hungary, with Transylvanian Saxons depicted in red-burgundy to the east of the former Hungarian kingdom and even a little bit outside its borders, in northern neighbouring Moldavia (what would later become Bukovina and present-day Suceava County respectively).

The ancestors of the modern Transylvanian Saxons originally came from the contemporary Low Countries (more specifically the regions of Flanders, Hainaut, Brabant, Liège, or Zeeland) as well as the Moselle and Lorraine river valleys, and Luxembourg as well, which around the 1140s were part of the north-western territories of the Holy Roman Empire. Further or subsequent waves of German colonists in Transylvania also stemmed from more southern regions of present-day Germany such as Thuringia or even Bavaria (the latter particularly valid for the Saxons in northeastern Transylvania). The initial waves of Transylvanian Saxons were referred to as hospites flandrenses et teutonici or primi hospites regni in Latin, literally "the Flemish and Teutonic guests" or "the first guests of the kingdom" (i.e. of the former Kingdom of Hungary).

For centuries, the main tasks of the Transylvanian Saxons during the High Middle Ages were to protect the easternmost frontiers of the former Kingdom of Hungary against certain invading migratory Asiatic peoples, to bring more agriculture to the region, to instil Central European culture, enhance trade, and boost urbanisation and overall economic development. In the process of fortifying the borders of the Kingdom of Hungary to the east, they were early on helped by the Teutonic Knights. Later on, they had to further strengthen their hometowns and rural settlements against the expanding Ottoman Empire, which posed a major threat from the south. The rural settlements defended themselves by fortifying their churches into small fortresses, known as either 'Wehrkirchen' (fortified churches) or 'Kirchenburgen' (church fortress) in standard German.

During the Modern Age, they favoured more and more the Romanians for the latter to obtain increased and rightful political, social, and cultural rights before the Hungarian nobility, with Transylvanian Saxon intellectuals pleading for the Latinity of the Romanian language and the Romanian people. They were subsequently allied with the Transylvanian Romanians and thus sided with the Austrian Empire in the context of the Hungarian Revolution of 1848.

After 1918 and the dissolution of Austria-Hungary, in the wake of the Treaty of Trianon (signed in 1920), Transylvania united with the Kingdom of Romania, after the Transylvanian Saxons also voted for the union with the Romanian kingdom in February 1919. Consequently, the Transylvanian Saxons, together with other ethnic German sub-groups in then newly enlarged Kingdom of Romania (namely the Banat Swabians, Sathmar Swabians, Bessarabia Germans, Bukovina Germans, and Zipser Germans), became part of that country's broader German minority. Today, relatively few still live in Romania, where the second last official census (carried out in 2011) indicated 36,042 Germans, out of which only 11,400 were of Transylvanian Saxon descent. As per the latest Romanian census conducted in 2022, they are even fewer, as other sub-groups of the entire German community in Romania as well.

=== Population: settlement and evolution ===
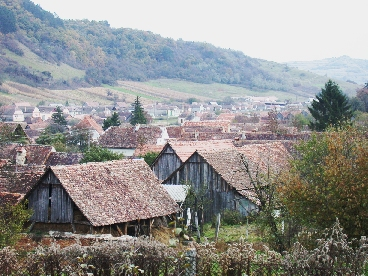
Iacobeni (German: Jakobsdorf, archaically in Romanian also known as Iacășdorf), an example of a fortified rural Transylvanian Saxon community established since the High Middle Ages and situated in Sibiu County (German: Kreis Hermannstadt).

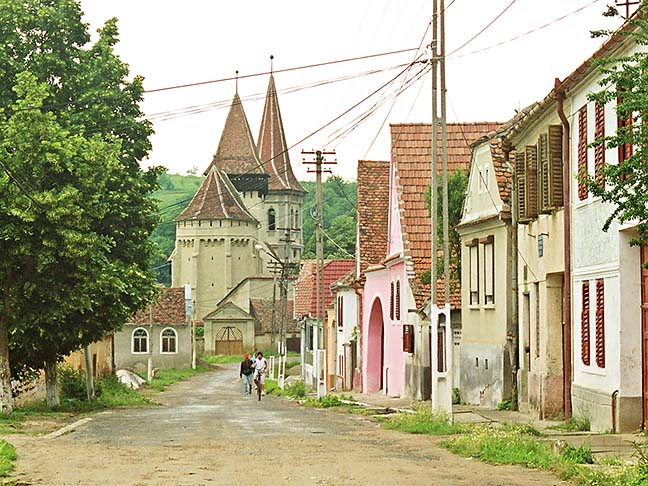
Șeica Mică (German: Kleinschelken), another example of a fortified rural Transylvanian Saxon community established since the High Middle Ages and situated in Sibiu County (German: Kreis Hermannstadt).

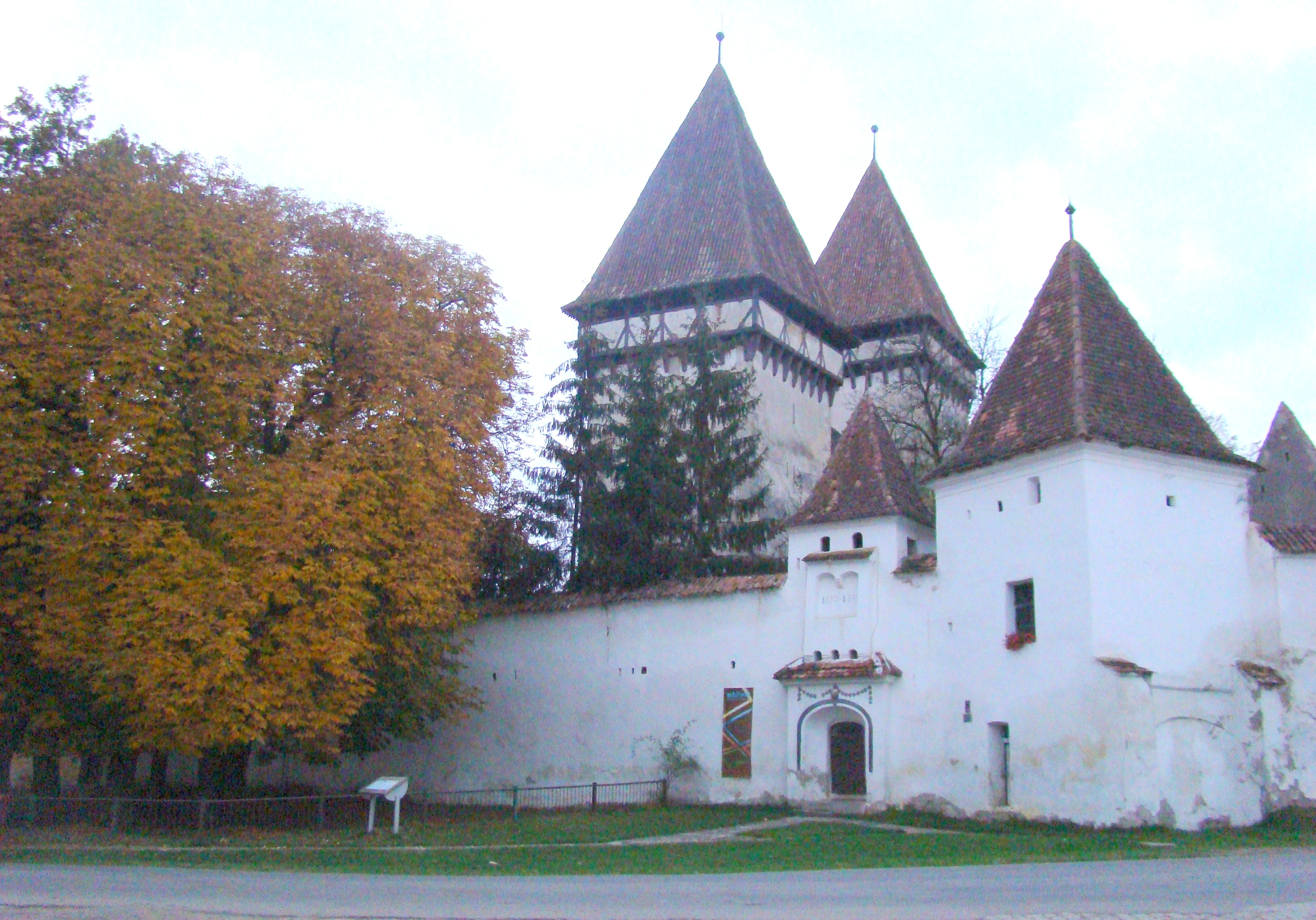
Medieval fortified Evangelical Lutheran church at Dealu Frumos (German: Schönberg) in Sibiu County (German: Kreis Hermannstadt)

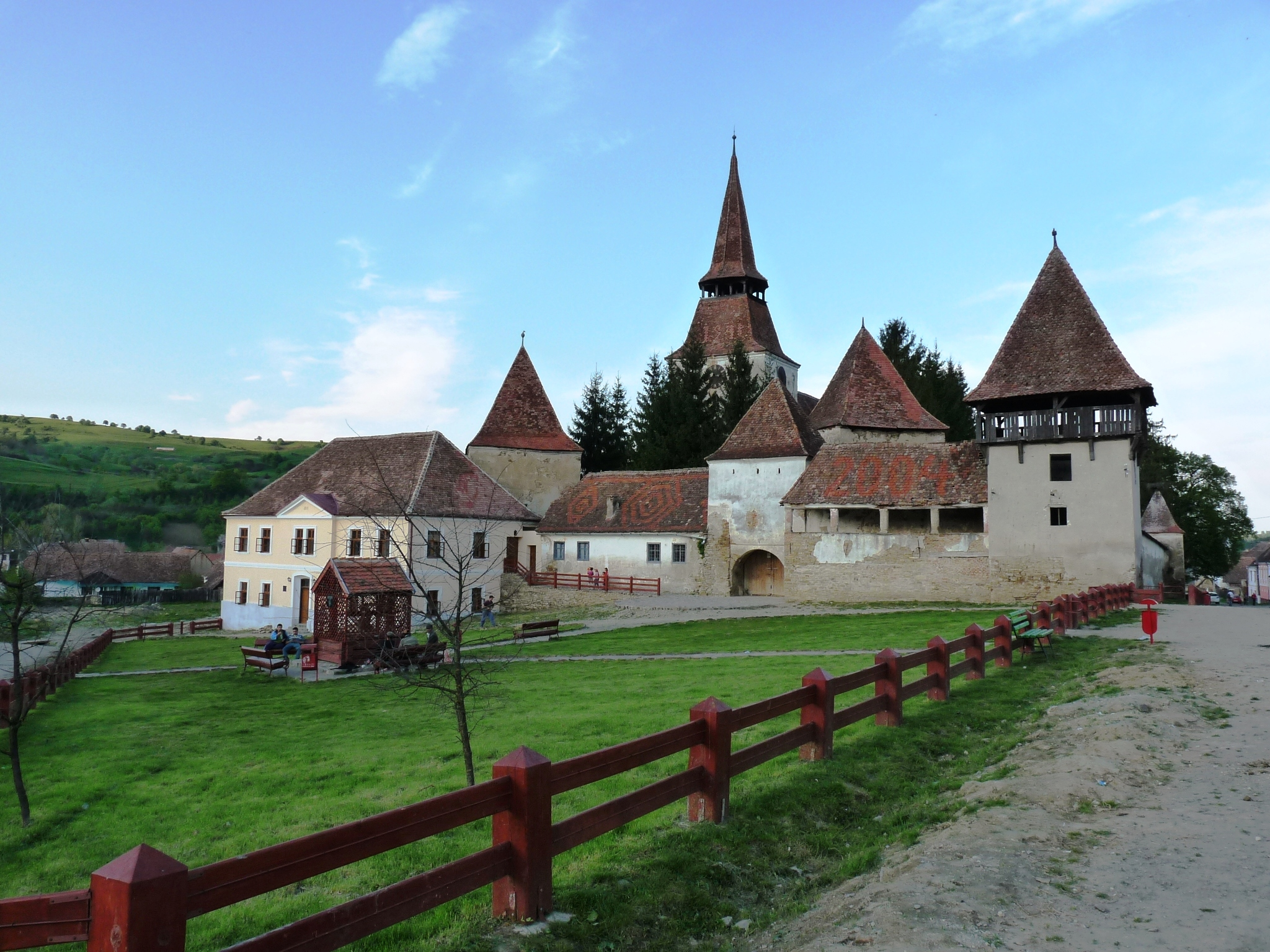
Medieval fortified Evangelical Lutheran church at Archita (German: Arkeden), Mureș County (German: Mieresch)

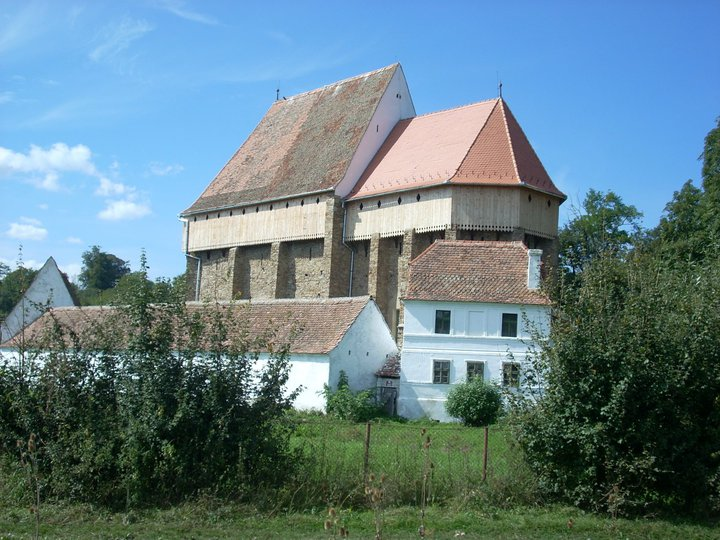
Further medieval Evangelical Lutheran fortified church situated in Brădeni (formerly Hendorf; German: Henndorf) in Sibiu County (German: Kreis Hermannstadt).

The colonization of Transylvania by ethnic Germans later collectively known as Transylvanian Saxons began under the reign of King Géza II of Hungary (1141–1162). For several consecutive centuries, the main task of these medieval German-speaking settlers (as that of the Szeklers for example in the east of Transylvania) was to defend the southern, southeastern, and northeastern borders of the then Kingdom of Hungary against foreign invaders stemming most notably from Central Asia and even far East Asia (e.g. Cumans, Pechenegs, Mongols, and Tatars). At the same time, the Saxons were also charged with developing agriculture and introducing Central European culture. Later on, the Saxons needed to further fortify both their rural and urban settlements against invading Ottomans (or against the invading and expanding Ottoman Empire). The Saxons in northeastern Transylvania were also in charge of mining. They can be perceived as being quite related to the Zipser Saxons from present-day Spiš (German: Zips), north-eastern Slovakia (as well as other historical regions of contemporary Romania, namely Maramureș and Bukovina) given the fact they are two of the oldest ethnic German groups in non-native German-speaking Central and Eastern Europe.

The first wave of settlement continued well until the end of the 13th century. Although the colonists came mostly from the western Holy Roman Empire, they came to be collectively referred to as 'Saxons' because of Germans working for the royal Hungarian chancellery.

Gradually, the type of medieval German once spoken by these settlers, craftsmen, guardsmen, miners, and various other workers became locally known as Såksesch (i.e. "Saxon"; more fully Siweberjesch-Såksesch "Transylvanian Saxon") and remains, still to this day, very closely related to Luxembourgish or Ripuarian with which it shares many lexical similarities.

The Transylvanian Saxon population has been steadily decreasing since World War II as they started leaving the territory of present-day Romania en masse during and after World War II, relocating initially to Austria, then predominantly to southern Germany (especially in Bavaria).

The process of emigration continued during communist rule in Romania. After the collapse of the Ceaușescu regime in 1989 and the fall of the East German communist government, many of them continued to emigrate to unified Germany. As a result, today only approximately 12,000 Saxons remain in Romania.

Nowadays, the vast majority of Transylvanian Saxons live in either Germany or Austria. Nonetheless, a sizable Transylvanian Saxon population also resides today in North America, most notably in the United States (specifically in Idaho, Ohio, and Colorado as well as in Canada, southern Ontario more precisely).

On the history of the Transylvanian Saxons, former federal German president and professor doctor Theodor Heuss (FDP) stated the following: "...their history is a piece of German history as a whole...".

== Origins and medieval settlements ==
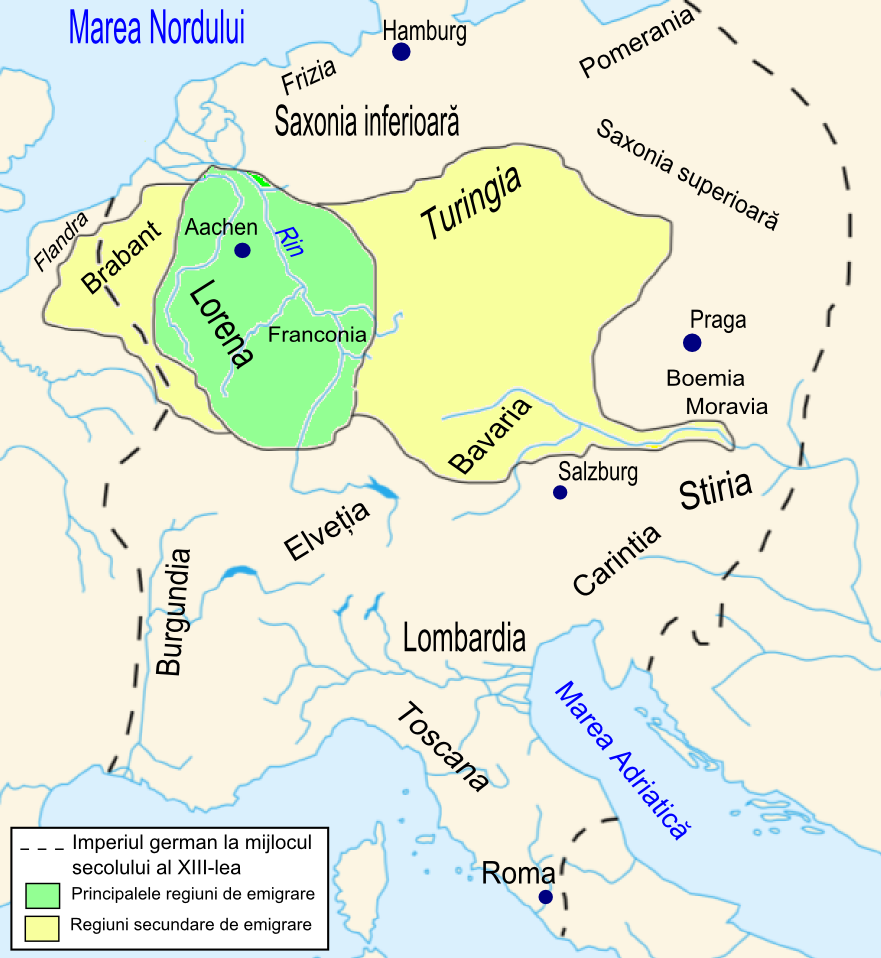
The regions of origin from which the initial waves of Transylvanian Saxons stemmed (the dotted line represents the border of the Holy Roman Empire during the High Middle Ages). Legend: Lorraine – the main region of origin of the initial settlers Brabant, Bavaria, and Thuringia – secondary regions of origin

Map depicting the territorial extent of the Transylvanian Saxons in Transylvania, including their sees and districts.

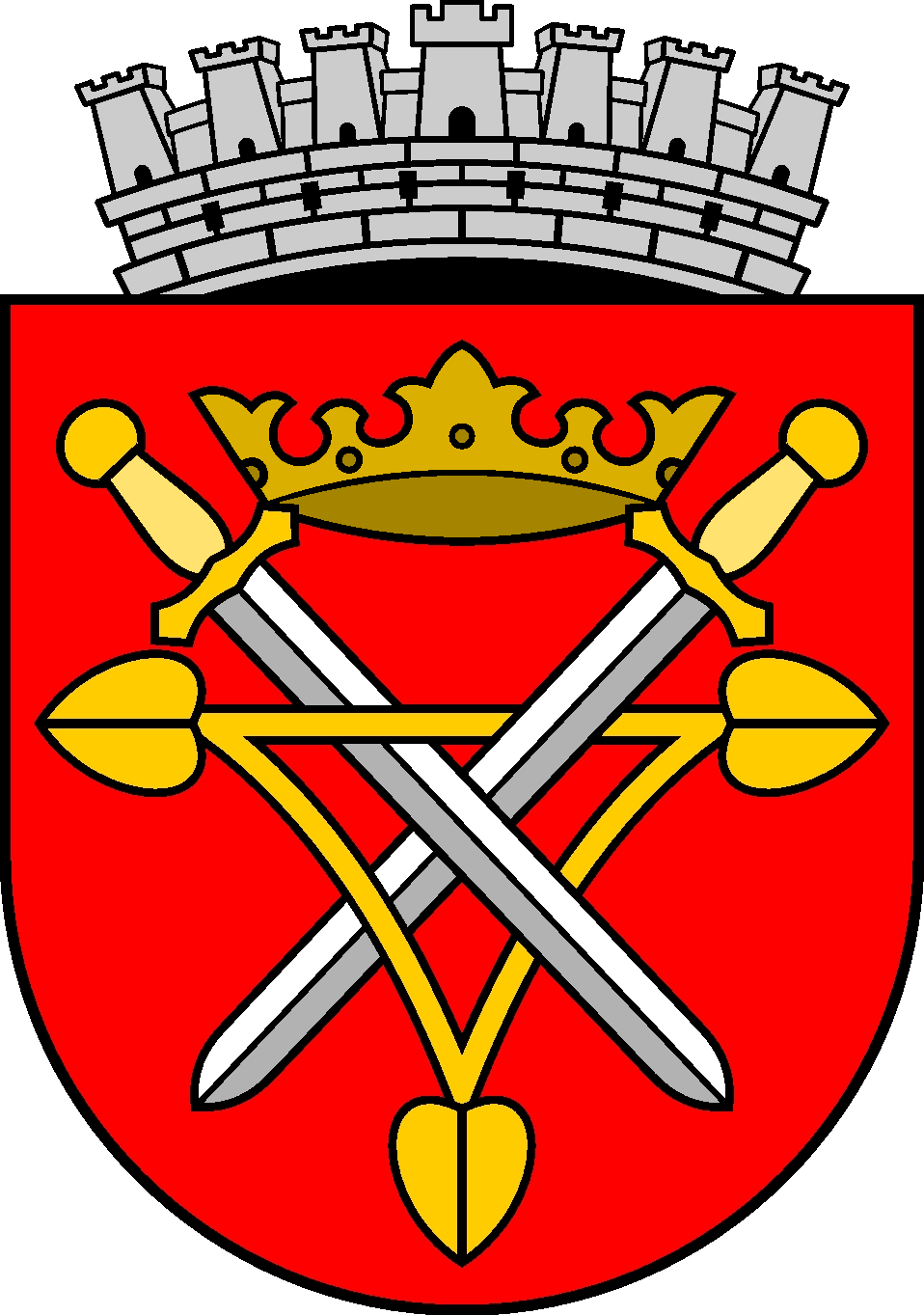
The official coat of arms of the town of Sibiu/Hermannstadt, with the water lily including the two swords therein.

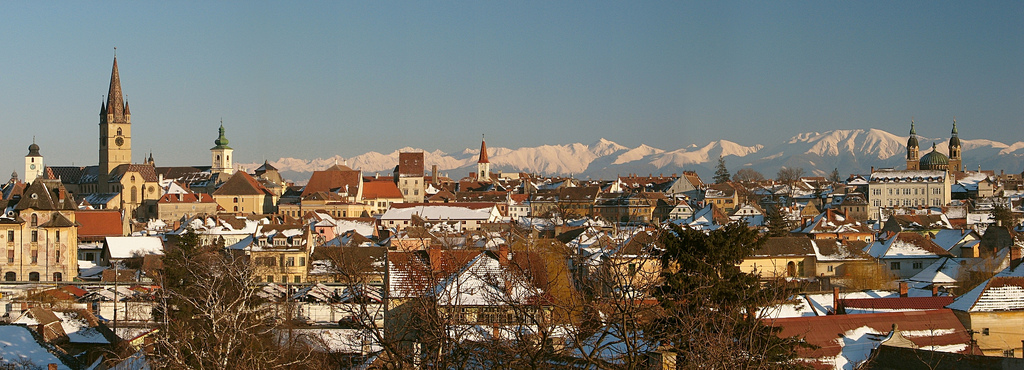
Panoramic view of Sibiu (German: Hermannstadt, Transylvanian Saxon: Härmeschtat), one of the oldest and most important towns of the Transylvanian Saxons (as well as of the Romanians). In 2007, it became European Capital of Culture along with Luxembourg City (Luxembourgish: Lëtzebuerg).

The initial phase of German settlement in Transylvania began in the mid and mid-late 12th century, with colonists travelling to and residing in what would later become known in standard German as Altland (i.e. Țara Oltului in Romanian, after the German name for the Olt river, or the old land as in a word for word translation from German) or Hermannstadt Provinz, based around the picturesque well preserved medieval town of Hermannstadt, today's Sibiu. Additionally, the surrounding areas of the present-day town of Sibiu/Hermannstadt (former European Capital of Culture in 2007 alongside Luxembourg City) were formed of marshlands in the High Middle Ages. This is further hinted but also highlighted in the coat of arms of the town of Sibiu/Hermannstadt (Latin: Cibinium) by the water lily included therein.

These German settlers were invited by Géza II. Although the primary reason for Géza II's invitation was border defence, similar to employing the Szeklers against foreign invaders in the east of Transylvania, Germans were also sought for their mining expertise as well as the ability to develop the region's economy. Most colonists to this area came from Luxembourg (Luxembourgish: Lëtzebuerg) and the Moselle River region (see for instance Medardus de Nympz, former knight and founder of the fortified village of Niemesch/Nemșa in Moșna).

A second phase of German settlement during the early 13th century consisted of settlers primarily stemming from the Rhineland region, the southern Low Countries, and the Moselle region, with others from Thuringia, Bavaria, and even from France. A settlement in northeastern Transylvania was centered on the town of Nösen, the later Bistritz (Romanian: Bistrița), located on the Bistrița River. The surrounding area became known as the Nösnerland. That area was important for mining in the Middle Ages.

Continued immigration from the Empire expanded the area of the Saxons further to the east. Settlers from the Hermannstadt region spread into the Hârtibaciu River valley (German: Harbachtal) and to the foot of the Cibin (German: Zibin) and Sebeș (German: Mühlbacher) mountains.

The latter region, centered around the town of Mühlbach (Romanian: Sebeș), was known as Unterwald. To the north of Hermannstadt they settled what they called the Weinland including the village of Nympz (Latin for Nemșa/Nimesch) near Mediasch (Romanian: Mediaș). Allegedly, the term Saxon was applied to all Germans of these historical regions because the first German settlers who came to the Kingdom of Hungary were either poor miners or groups of convicts from Saxony.

In 1211, King Andrew II of Hungary invited the Teutonic Knights to settle and defend the Burzenland in the southeastern corner of Transylvania. To guard the mountain passes of the Carpathians (German: Karpaten) against the Cumans, the knights constructed numerous castles and towns, including the major city of Kronstadt (Romanian: Brașov).

Alarmed by the knights' rapidly expanding power, in 1225 King Andrew II expelled the Teutonic Order from Transylvania permanently, which henceforth relocated to Prussia in 1226, although the colonists remained in Burzenland. The Kingdom of Hungary's medieval eastern borders were therefore defended in the northeast by the Nösnerland Saxons, in the east by the Hungarian border guard tribe of the Székelys, in the southeast by the castles built by the Teutonic Knights and Burzenland Saxons and in the south by the Altland Saxons.

A common interpretation of the tale of the Pied Piper of Hamelin, dated to 26 June 1284 and recorded in Hamelin records that (the earliest of such records dating from 1384: "It is 100 years since our children left") when a group of 130 children from the town of Hamelin (German: Hameln), in present-day Lower Saxony, were led away from their hometown by a piper (who may be a folk memory of a lokator) is that this related to an emigration event as part of the Ostsiedlung (i.e. Eastern settlement). The destination is usually supposed to have been Prignitz, Uckermark, and Pomerania, but a minor alternative theory suggests settlement in Transylvania.

=== The proper usage of the term Saxon in the context of medieval Transylvania ===
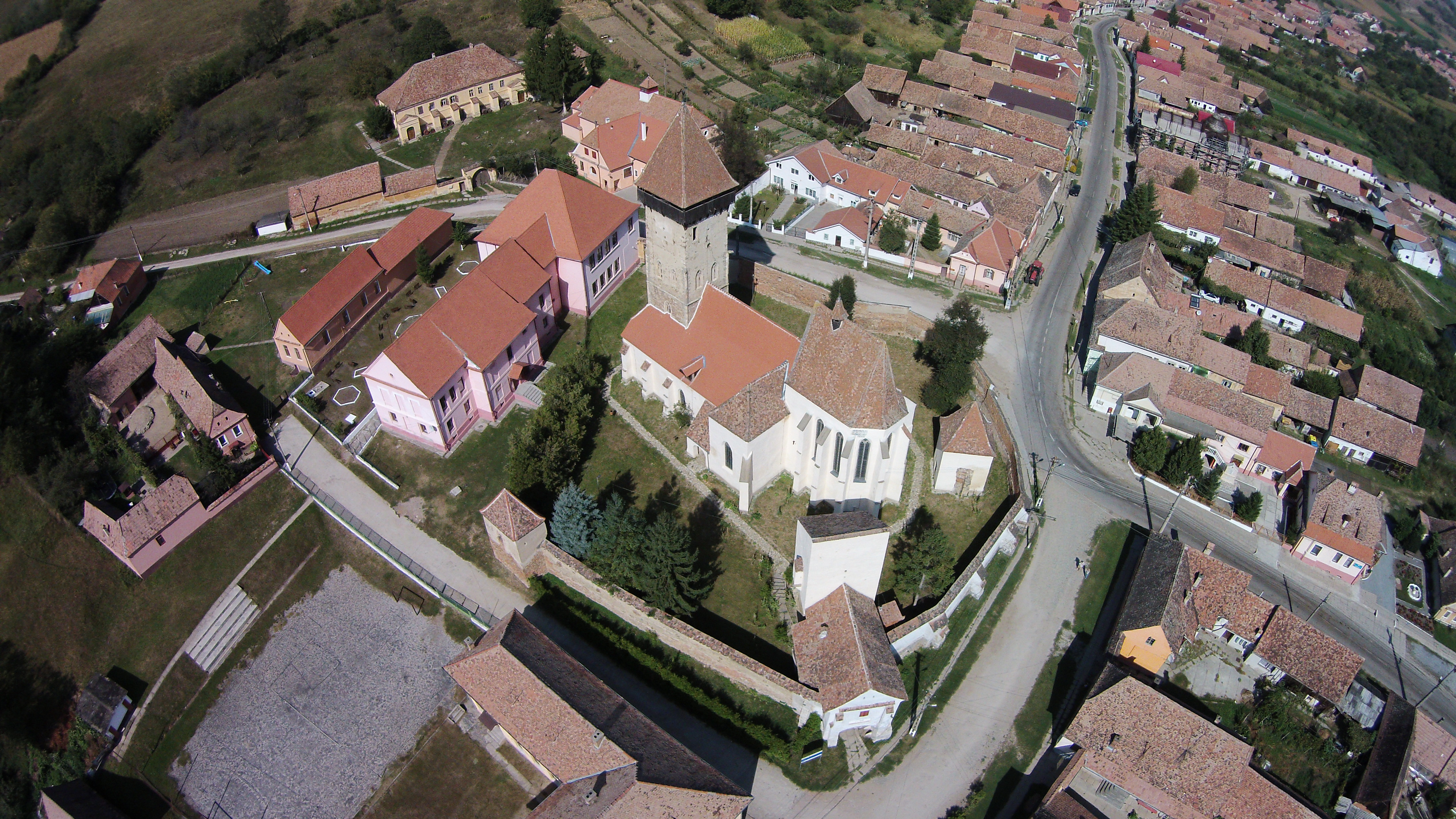
Ațel (German: Hetzeldorf), Sibiu County (German: Kreis Hermannstadt), with the local medieval Evangelical Lutheran fortified church situated in the centre of the aerial photograph.

In the context of medieval Transylvania, the term Saxon was used to denote a nobleman's title and not necessarily someone who was German-speaking. In these regards, the Saxon title could have been awarded to someone who was a non-native German speaker as well. Not all Transylvanian Saxon settlers were German-speaking given the fact that they also stemmed from the contemporary Low Countries (i.e. aside from Luxembourg, also contemporary Netherlands and Belgium) and from modern day France as well. Additionally, it is equally important to mention the fact that the family name 'Sas' or 'Sasu' in Romanian and 'Szász' respectively in Hungarian could denote both an ethnic lineage as well as a social liaison to the Saxon title awarded in Transylvania during the High Middle Ages.

=== Transylvanian Saxon ethnic consciousness ===
Hence, taking in consideration the aforementioned regarding the Saxon title in high medieval Transylvania, the Transylvanian Saxons' ethnic consciousness subsequently solidified after the first waves of settlers from Western Europe arrived in the region and was further reinforced or revitalised with new waves of settlers from central and southern present-day Germany during the Modern Age, more specifically during the 19th century. Furthermore, Transylvanian Saxon intellectual Stephan Ludwig Roth also pleaded for a strengthening of the German element in Transylvania during the 19th century by means of subsequent waves of settlers stemming from contemporary Germany while at the same time firstly supporting the rights of the ethnic Romanians.

== Medieval organization ==
=== Legal organization ===
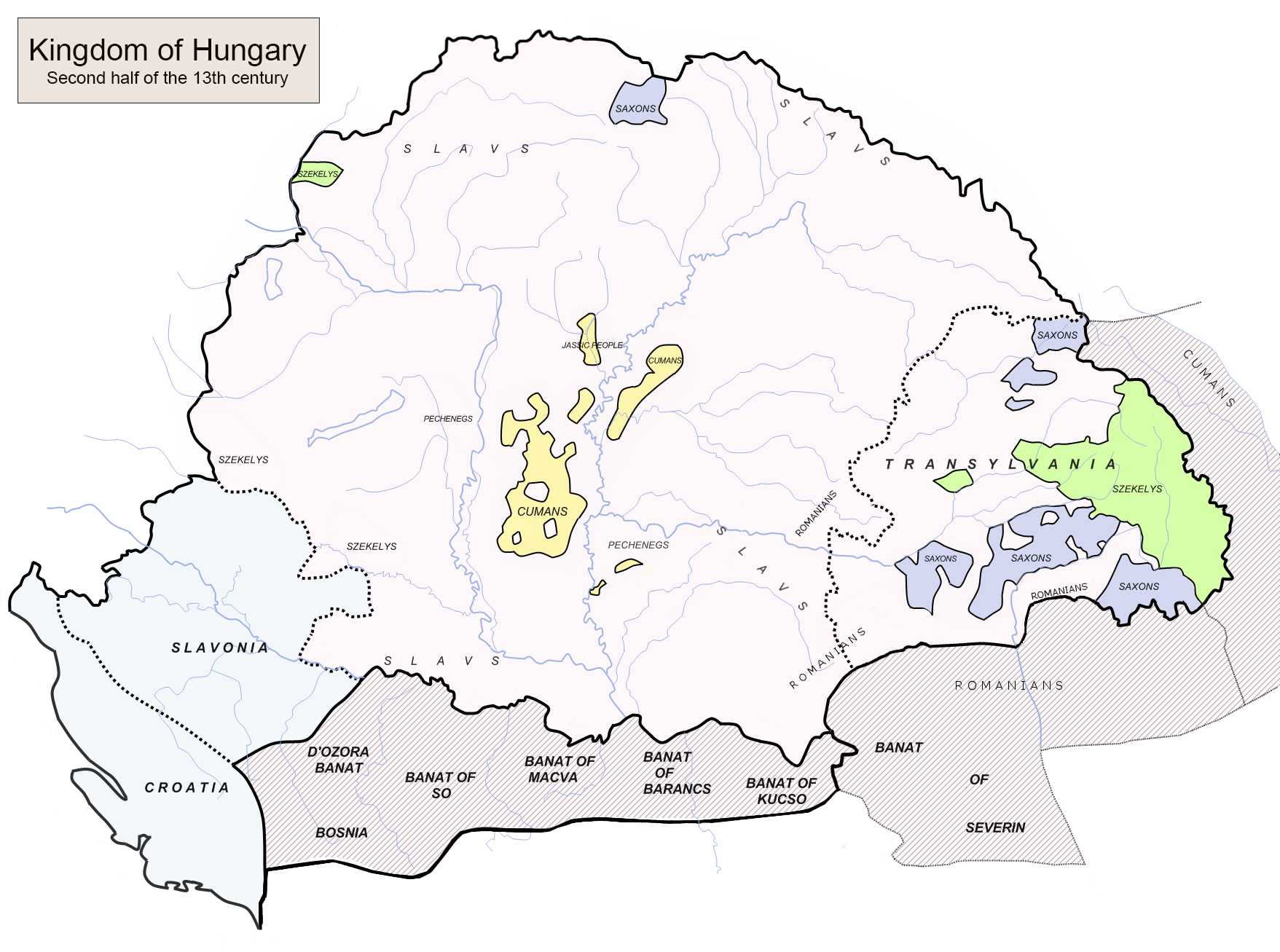
Map depicting the local autonomies in the Kingdom of Hungary during the 13th century (blue grey denotes Transylvanian Saxon autonomous medieval seats or territories). (Note: The small blue grey-coloured region to the north of the map is situated in present-day Slovakia and represents the Zips or Spiš region where Zipser Germans or Zipser Saxons, as they are also known and sometimes referred to as, were invited to settle by the Hungarian Kings throughout the passing of time during the High and Late Middle Ages as well.)

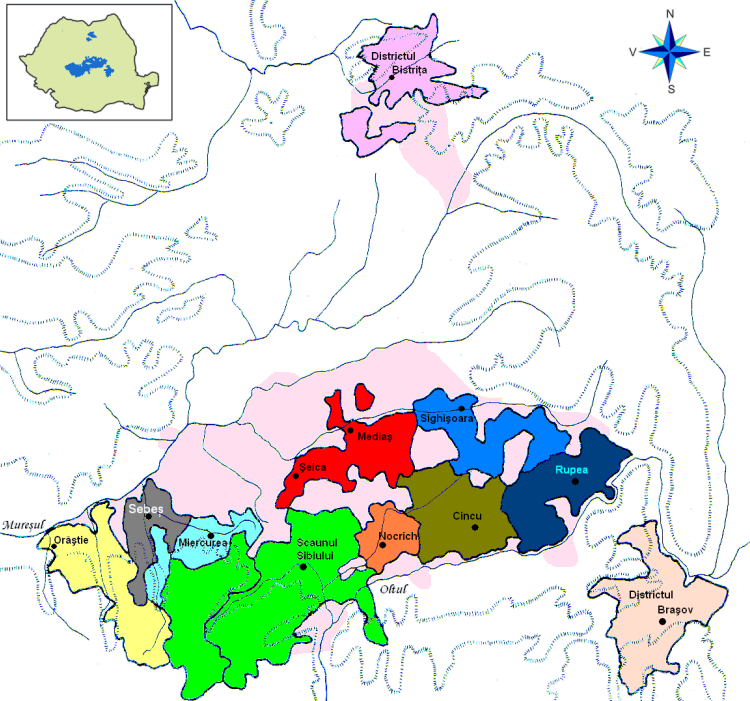
Romanian-language map depicting the total territorial extent of the Saxon lands/seats in southern, south-eastern, and north-eastern Transylvania.

Detailed and bilingual Romanian-German map depicting the Transylvanian Saxon seats and historical lands in Transylvania.

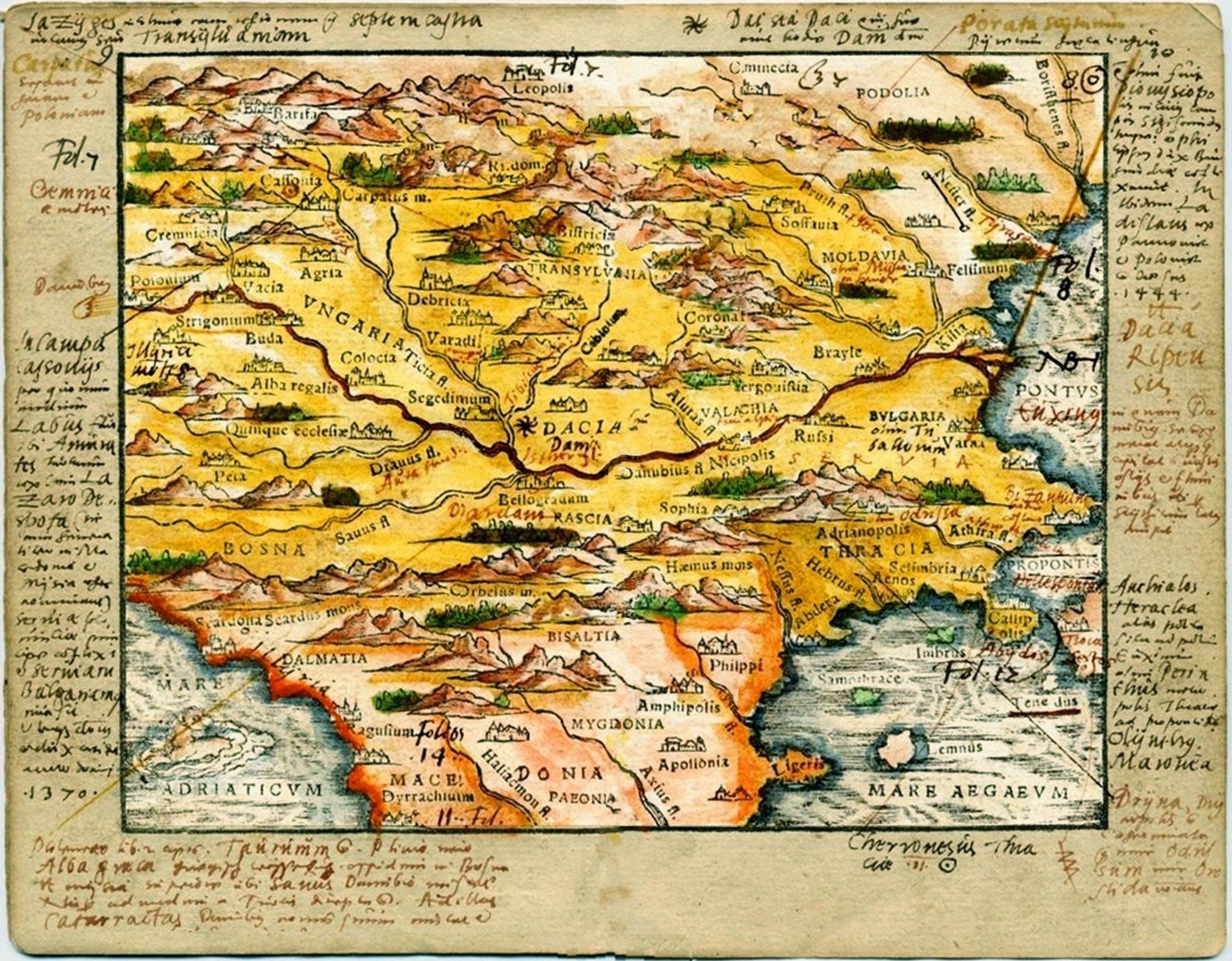
Septemcastrensis de Corona, 16th century Latin-language map depicting Transylvania and its surroundings by Transylvanian Saxon scholar Johannes Honterus.

A brief aerial footage of the Transylvanian Saxon Evangelical Lutheran fortified church of Viscri/Weißkirch, one of the most important and well known of its kind in Transylvania.

Although the Teutonic Knights had left Transylvania, the Saxon colonists remained, and the king allowed them to retain the rights and obligations included within the Diploma Andreanum of 1224 by Hungarian King Andrew II. This document conferred upon the German population of the territory between Drăușeni (German: Draas, Romanian: Drăușeni) and Orăștie (German: Broos, Romanian: Orăștie) both administrative and religious autonomy and defined their obligations towards the Hungarian monarchs. Consequently, they had to pay yearly tax to the king and provide military contributions to the royal army in case of danger of attack from abroad.

Otherwise, they enjoyed suzerainty; even Hungarians could not settle down in the Saxon territories. The territory colonized by Germans covered an area of about 30,000 km^{2} (10,000 sq. mi.). The region was called Royal Lands or Saxon Lands (German: Königsboden; Hungarian: Királyföld or Szászföld; Romanian: Pământul crăiesc; Latin: Terra Saxonum or Fundus Regius). During the reign of Hungarian King Charles I (probably 1325–1329; also referred to as Charles Robert d'Anjou), the Saxons were organized in the Saxon Chairs (or seats) as follows:

Coat of arms	Seat	Town
	Repser Stuhl	Reps/Räppes (Rupea)
	Grossschenker Stuhl	Groß-Schenk/Schoink (Cincu)
	Schässburger Stuhl	Schäßburg/Schäsbrich (Sighișoara)
	Mühlbacher Stuhl	Mühlbach/Melnbach (Sebeș)
	Brooser Stuhl	Broos (Orăștie)
	Hermannstädter Hauptstuhl (Note: 'Hauptstuhl' means head/high seat and this one in particular was the most important administrative unit and centre of the Transylvanian Saxons throughout the passing of time, in cultural, religious, and political regards.)	Hermannstadt/Härmeschtat (Sibiu)
	Reussmarkter Stuhl	Reussmarkt/Reismuert (Miercurea Sibiului)
	Mediascher Stuhl	Mediasch/Medwesch (Mediaș)
	Schelker Stuhl	Marktschelken/Marktšielken (Șeica Mare)

The territorial extent of the aforementioned Saxon seats can be clearly seen in depth in the maps from the gallery below:

Hermannstädter Hauptstuhl

Brooser Stuhl

Mühlbacher Stuhl

Reußmarkter Stuhl

Leskircher Stuhl

Großschenker Stuhl

Schäßburger Stuhl

Repser Stuhl

Zwei Stühle (i.e. Two Seats), Mediasch und Schelk

Mediascher Stuhl

Schelker Stuhl

Aside from the Saxon seats, there had also been two districts, namely Bistritz/Bistrița and Kronstadt/Brașov, which had the following territorial extent, as depicted in the maps below:

Bistritzer Distrikt

Kronstädter Distrikt

=== Religious organizations ===
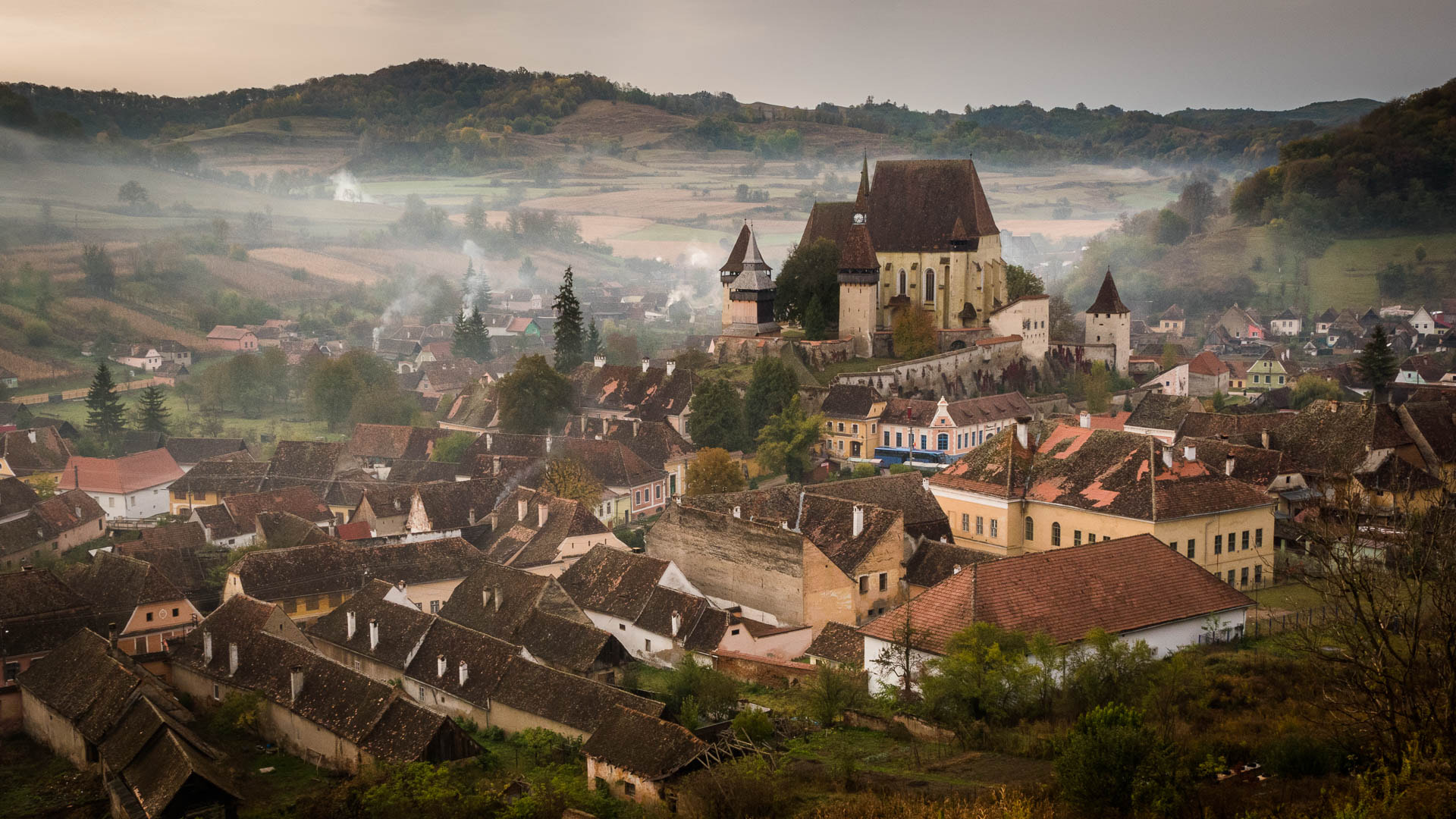
Biertan (German: Birthälm), a prominent example of a medieval fortified Transylvanian Saxon village with its church depicted in the top centre. Initially Catholic, most of the churches of the Transylvanian Saxons switched to Lutheranism after the Reformation. In addition, Biertan/Birthälm was the see of the Lutheran Bishop in Transylvania between 1572 and 1867.

Along with the Teutonic Order, other religious organizations important to the development of German communities were the Cistercian abbeys of Igrisch (Igriș) in the Banat region respectively Kerz (Cârța) in Fogaraschland (Țara Făgărașului). The earliest religious organization of the Saxons was the Provostship of Hermannstadt (now Sibiu), founded 20 December 1191. In its early years, it included the territories of Hermannstadt, Leschkirch (Nocrich), and Groß-Schenk (Cincu), the areas that were colonized the earliest by ethnic Germans in the region.

Under the influence of Johannes Honterus, the great majority of the Transylvanian Saxons embraced the new creed of Martin Luther during the Protestant Reformation. The first superintendent of the Transylvanian Saxons' Lutheran Church, Paul Wiener, was elected by Saxon pastors at a synod on 6 February 1553.

Almost all became Lutheran Protestants, with very few Calvinists, while other minor segments of the Transylvanian Saxon society remained staunchly Catholic (of Latin Church, more specifically). Nonetheless, one of the consequences of the Reformation was the emergence of an almost perfect equivalence, in the Transylvanian context, of the terms Lutheran and Saxon, with the Lutheran Church in Transylvania being de facto a "Volkskirche", i.e. the "national church" of the Transylvanian Saxons (or the people's church of the Saxons).

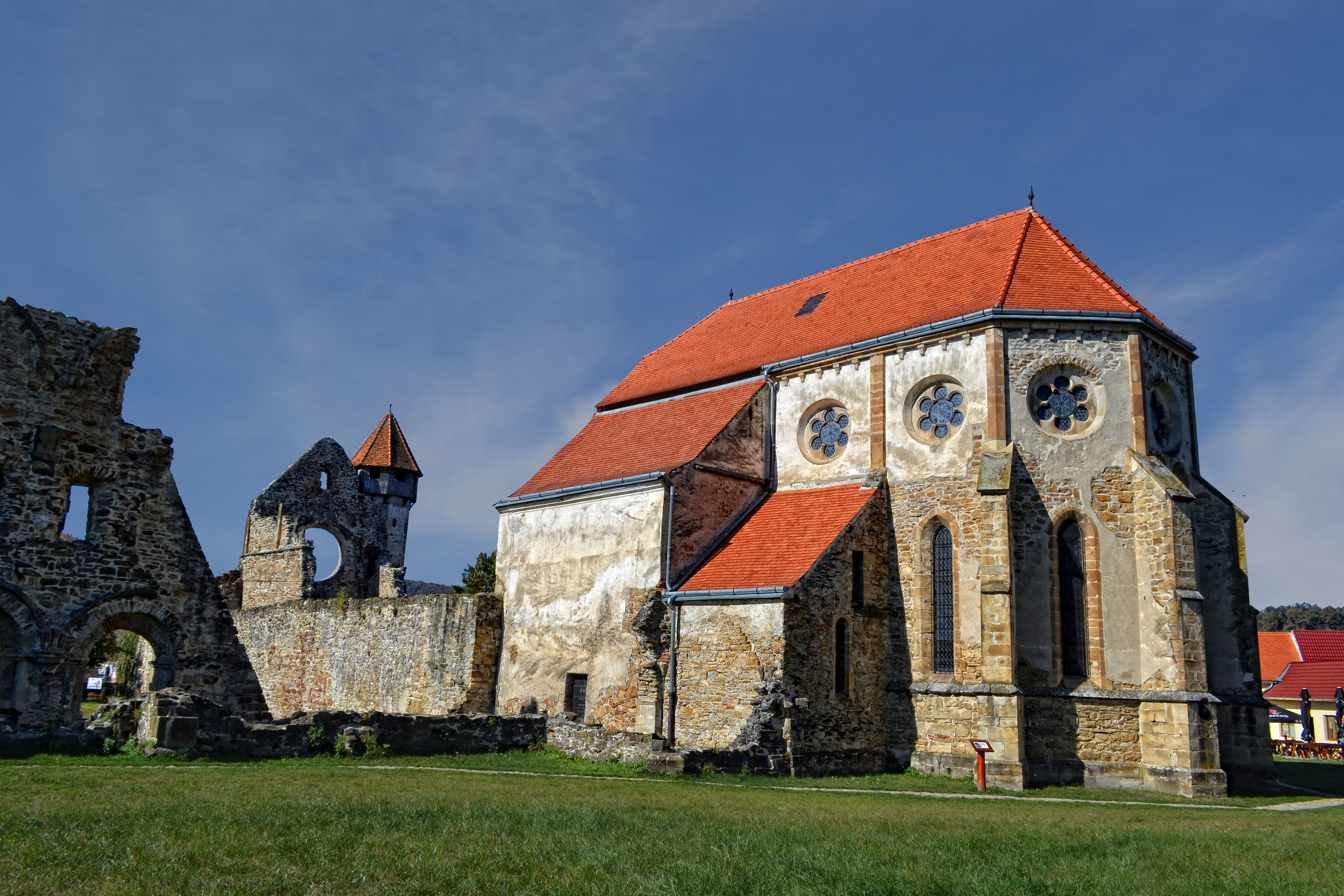
Cârța (German: Kerz) medieval monastery

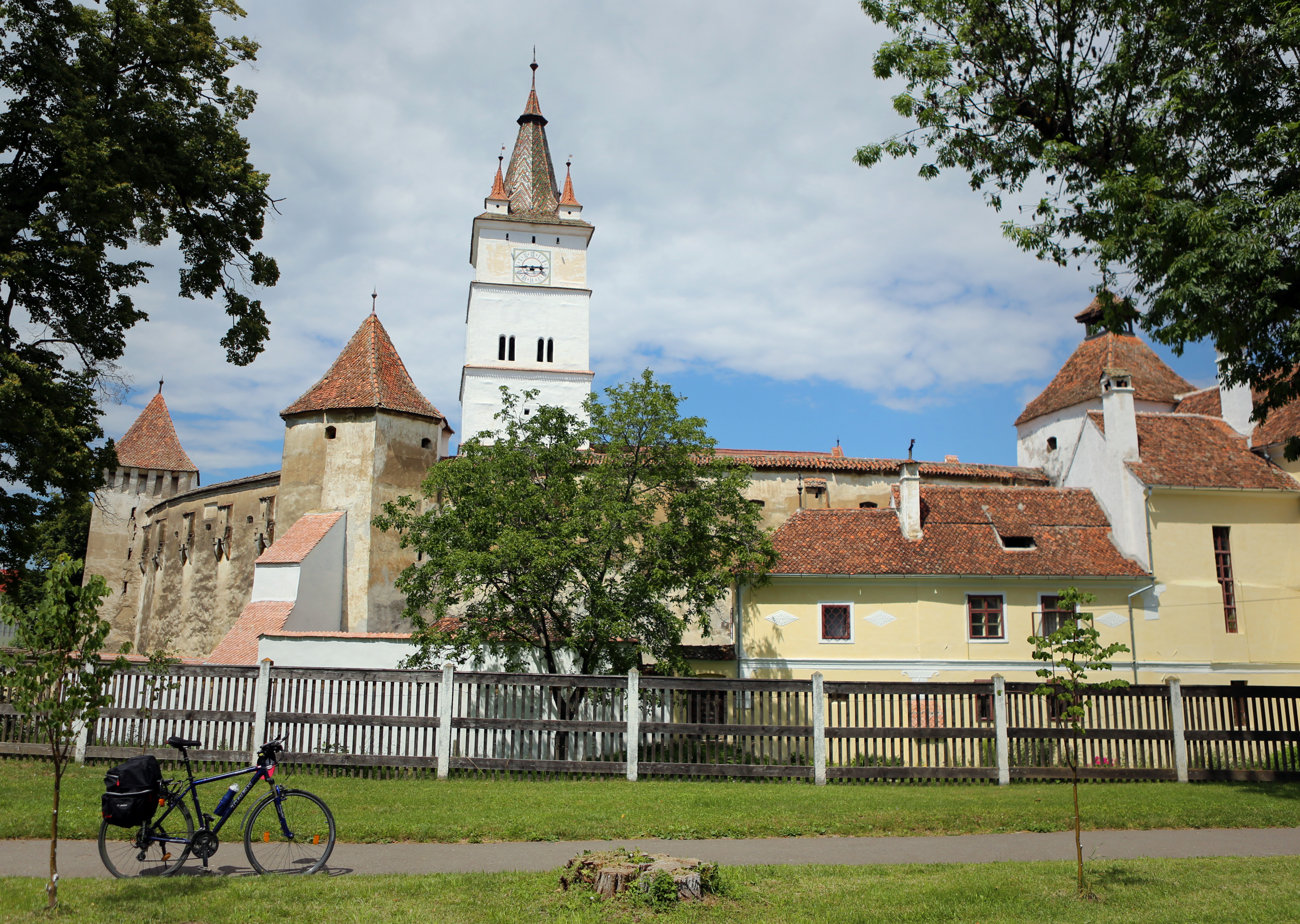
Hărman (German: Honigberg) Lutheran medieval fortified church

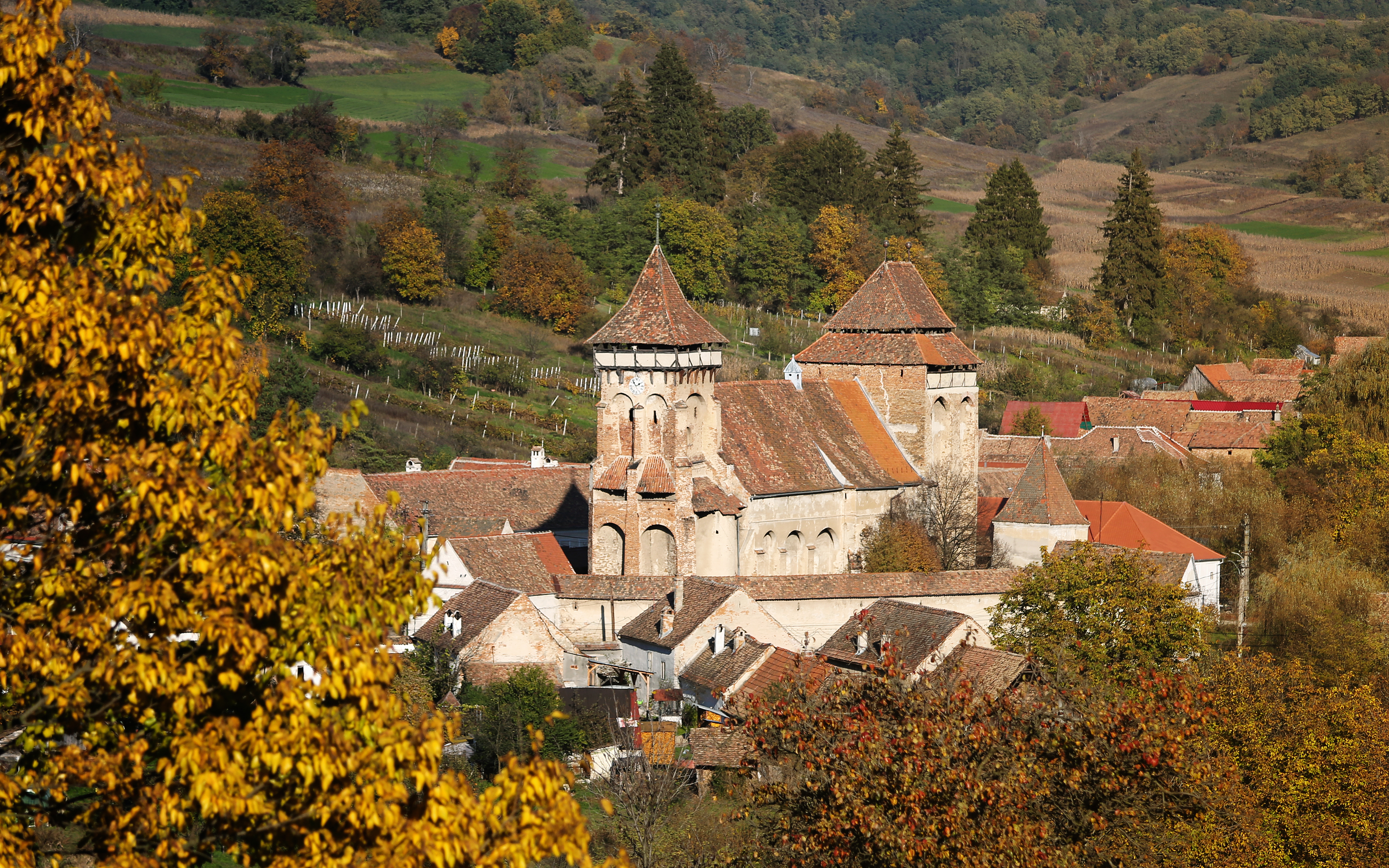
Valea Viilor (German: Wurmloch) Lutheran medieval fortified church

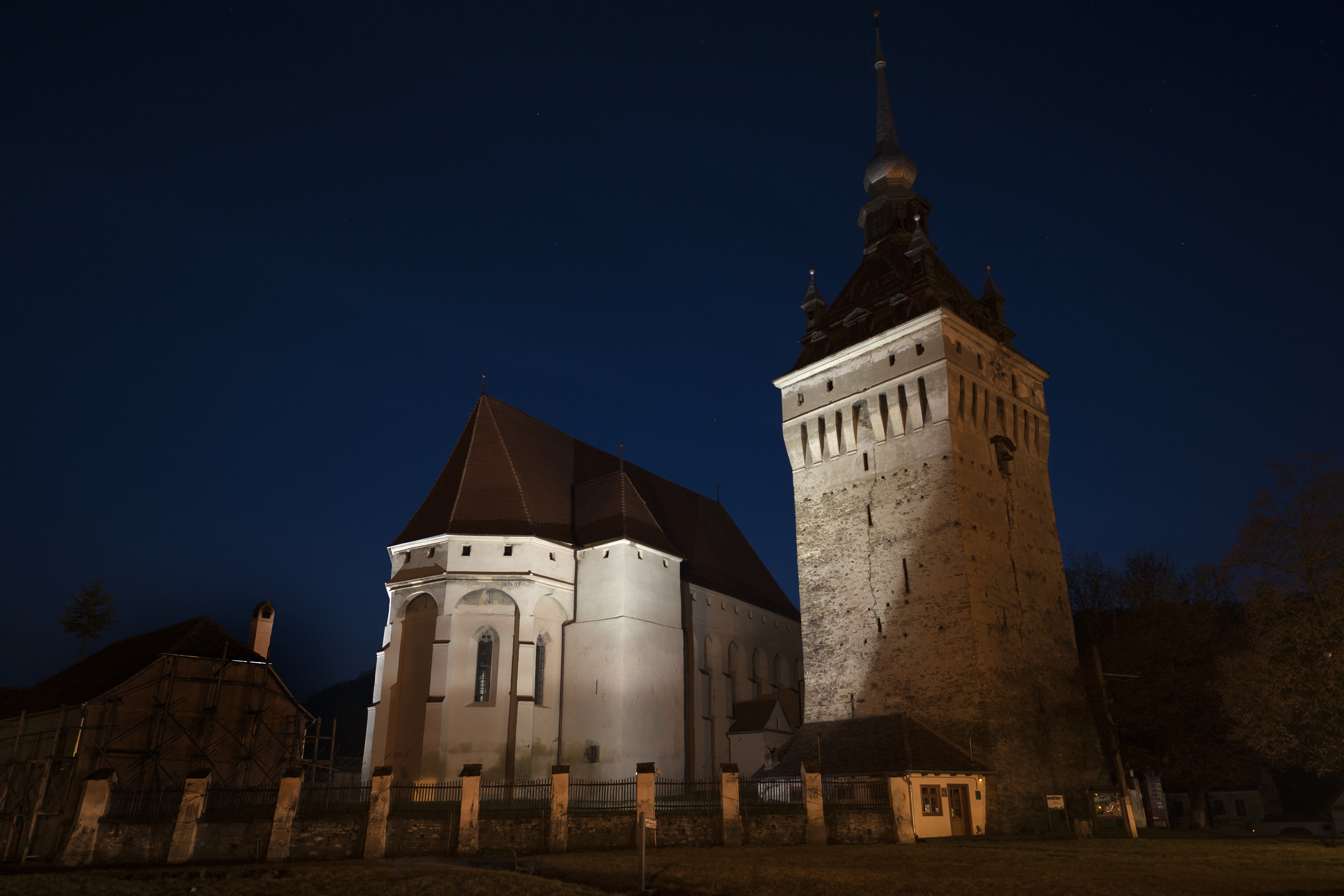
Saschiz (German: Keisd or Hünenburg) Lutheran medieval fortified church

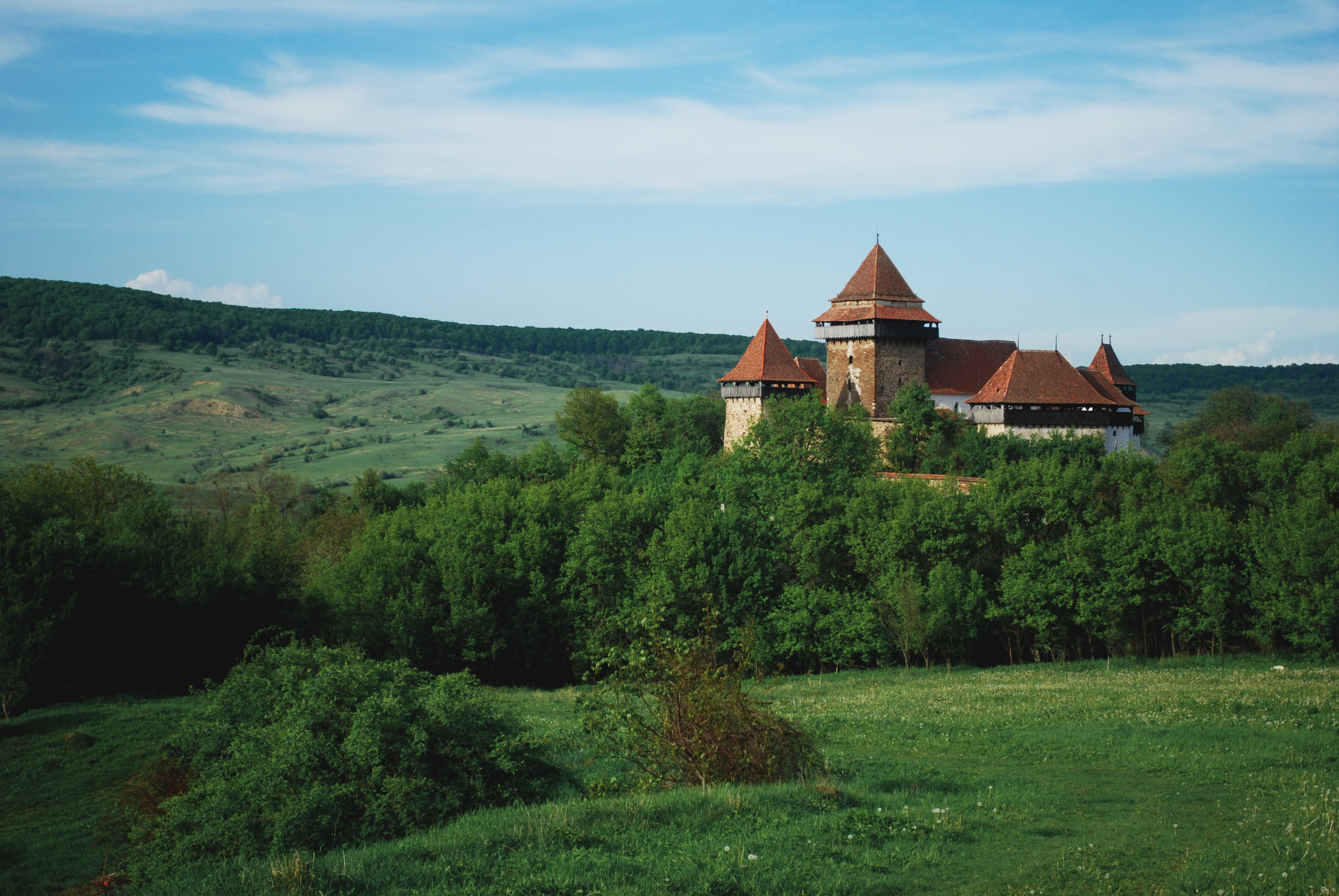
Viscri (German: Weisskirch) Lutheran medieval fortified church

== Fortification of the towns ==
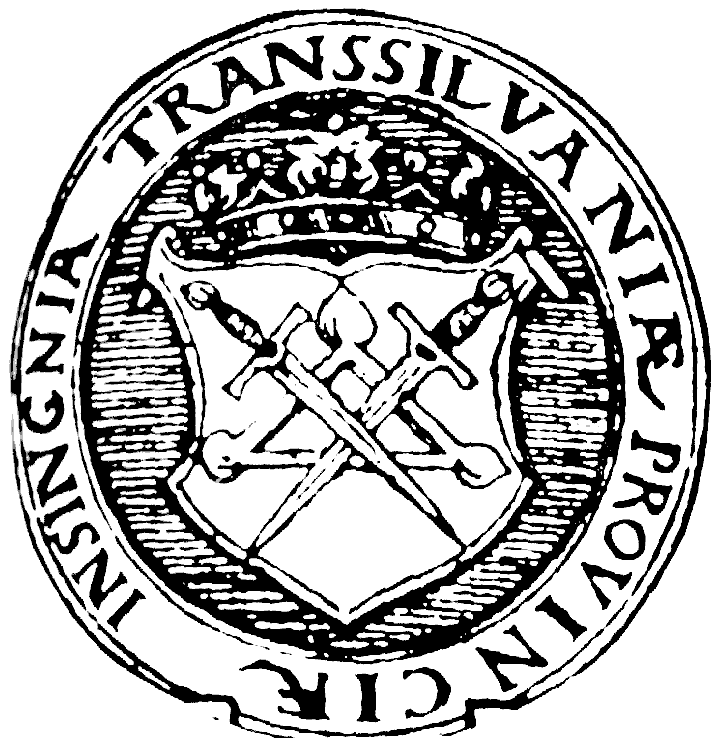
The coat of arms of Transylvania, with the seal of Sibiu (German: Hermannstadt) depicted in the centre.

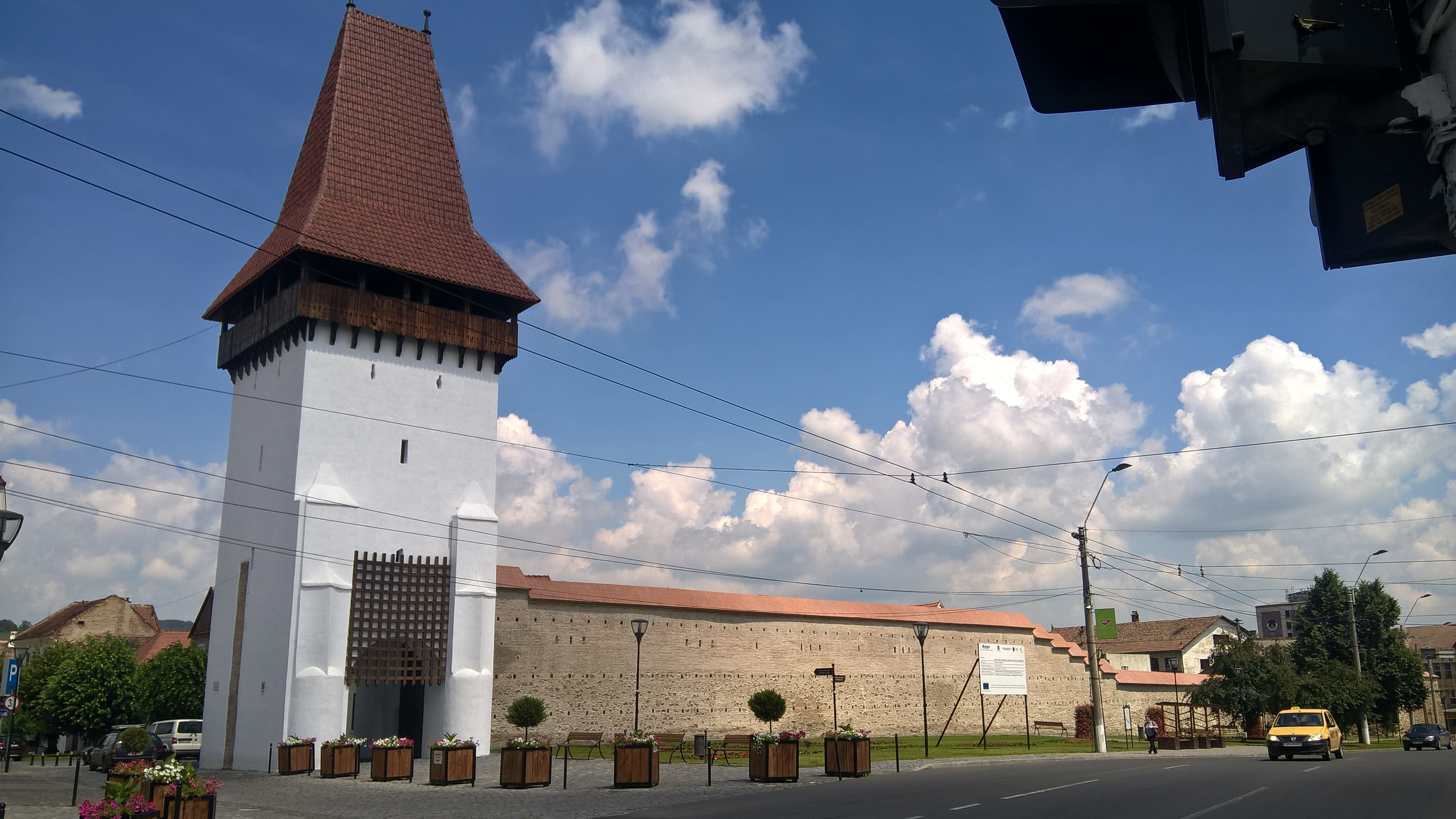
The Forkesch Tower (German: Der Forkesch Turm, Romanian: Turnul lui Forkesch), a prominent example of Transylvanian Saxon urban fortification in Mediaș (German: Mediasch) in Sibiu County (German: Kreis Hermannstadt).

The Mongol invasion of 1241–42 devastated much of the Kingdom of Hungary. Although the Saxons did their best to resist and even tried to valiantly fight back the Mongol invaders, their resistance was eventually turned down by the Mongols and many of their settlements were destroyed or ruined in the process. After the Mongols retreated from Transylvania, in the event of another invasion, many Transylvanian towns were fortified with stone castles and an emphasis was put on developing towns economically. In the Middle Ages, approximately 300 villages were defended by the Kirchenburgen, or fortified churches with massive walls and watch towers.

Although many of these fortified churches have fallen into either decay or ruin, nowadays the south-eastern region of Transylvania still has one of the highest density of existing fortified churches from the 13th to 16th centuries as more than 150 villages in the area count various types of fortified churches in good shape, seven of them being included in the UNESCO World Heritage under the name of Villages with fortified churches in Transylvania. The rapid expansion of cities populated by the Saxons led to Transylvania being known in German as Siebenbürgen and Septem Castra or Septem Castrensis in Latin, (Note: Although either Septem Castra or Septem Castrensis can actually refer to the seven Roman forts which existed prior to the arrival of the Transylvanian Saxons in Transylvania as well (given the fact that 'castra' was Latin for 'fortified garrison').) referring to seven of the fortified towns (see Historical names of Transylvania), most likely:

- Nösen/Bistritz (Note: Nösen is the archaic name of the town.) (Romanian: Bistrița; Transylvanian Saxon: Bästerts)
- Hermannstadt (Romanian: Sibiu; Transylvanian Saxon: Härmeschtat/Hermestatt)
- Klausenburg (Romanian: Cluj-Napoca, Transylvanian Saxon: Kleusenburch)
- Kronstadt (Romanian: Brașov; Transylvanian Saxon: Kruhnen)
- Mediasch (Romanian: Mediaș; Transylvanian Saxon: Medwesch/Medwisch)
- Mühlbach (Romanian: Sebeș; Transylvanian Saxon: Melnbach/Mühllenbach)
- Schässburg/Schäßburg (Romanian: Sighișoara; Transylvanian Saxon: Schäsbrich)

Other potential candidates for this list include:

- Broos (Romanian: Orăștie, Transylvanian Saxon: Brooss)
- Sächsisch-Regen (Romanian: Reghin, Transylvanian Saxon: Reen)

Other notable urban Saxon settlements include:

- Heltau (Romanian: Cisnădie; Transylvanian Saxon: Hielt)
- Rosenau (Romanian: Râșnov Transylvanian Saxon: Ruusenåå)
- Reps (Romanian: Rupea; Transylvanian Saxon: Räppes)
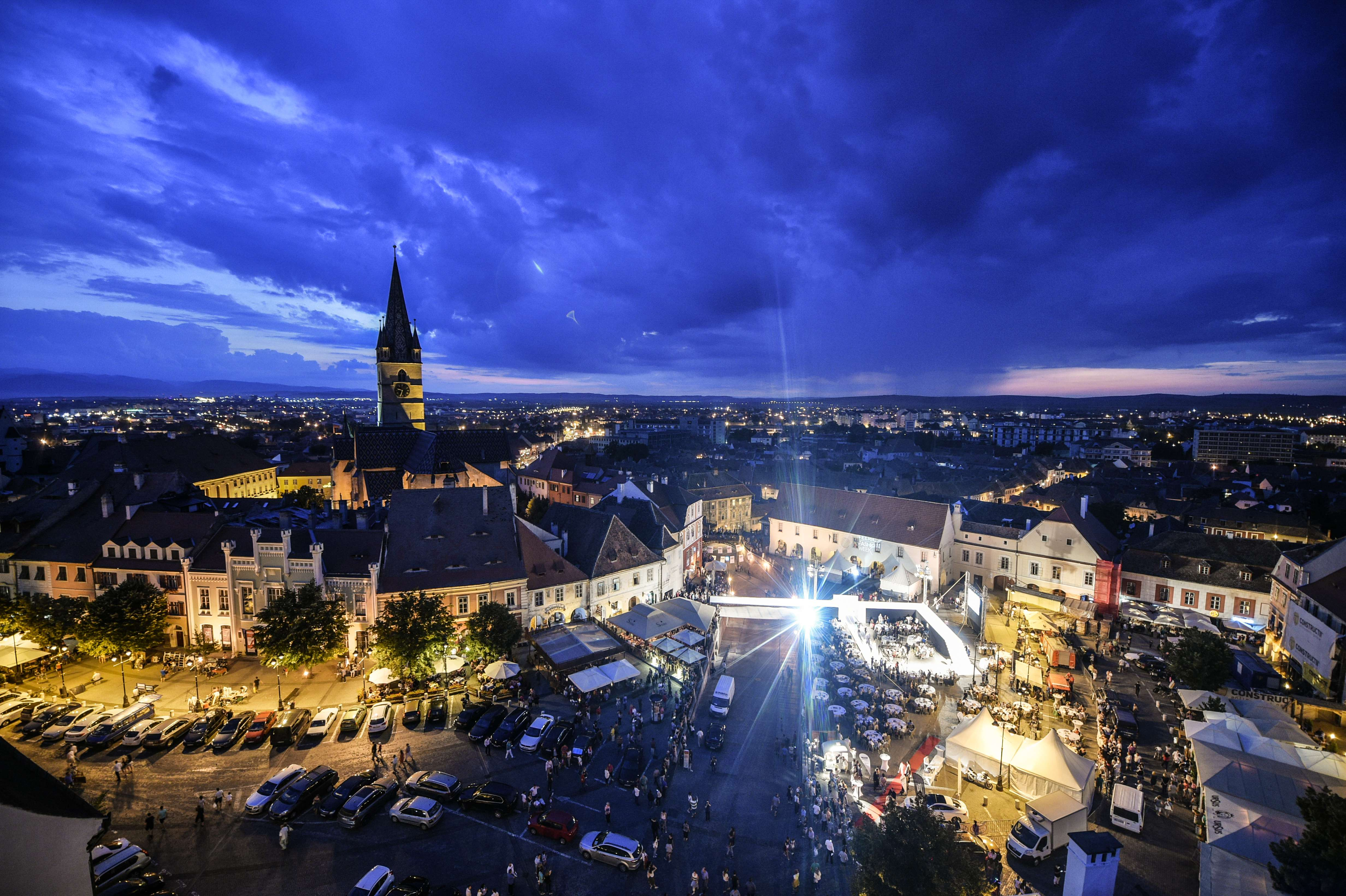
Hermannstadt (Sibiu)

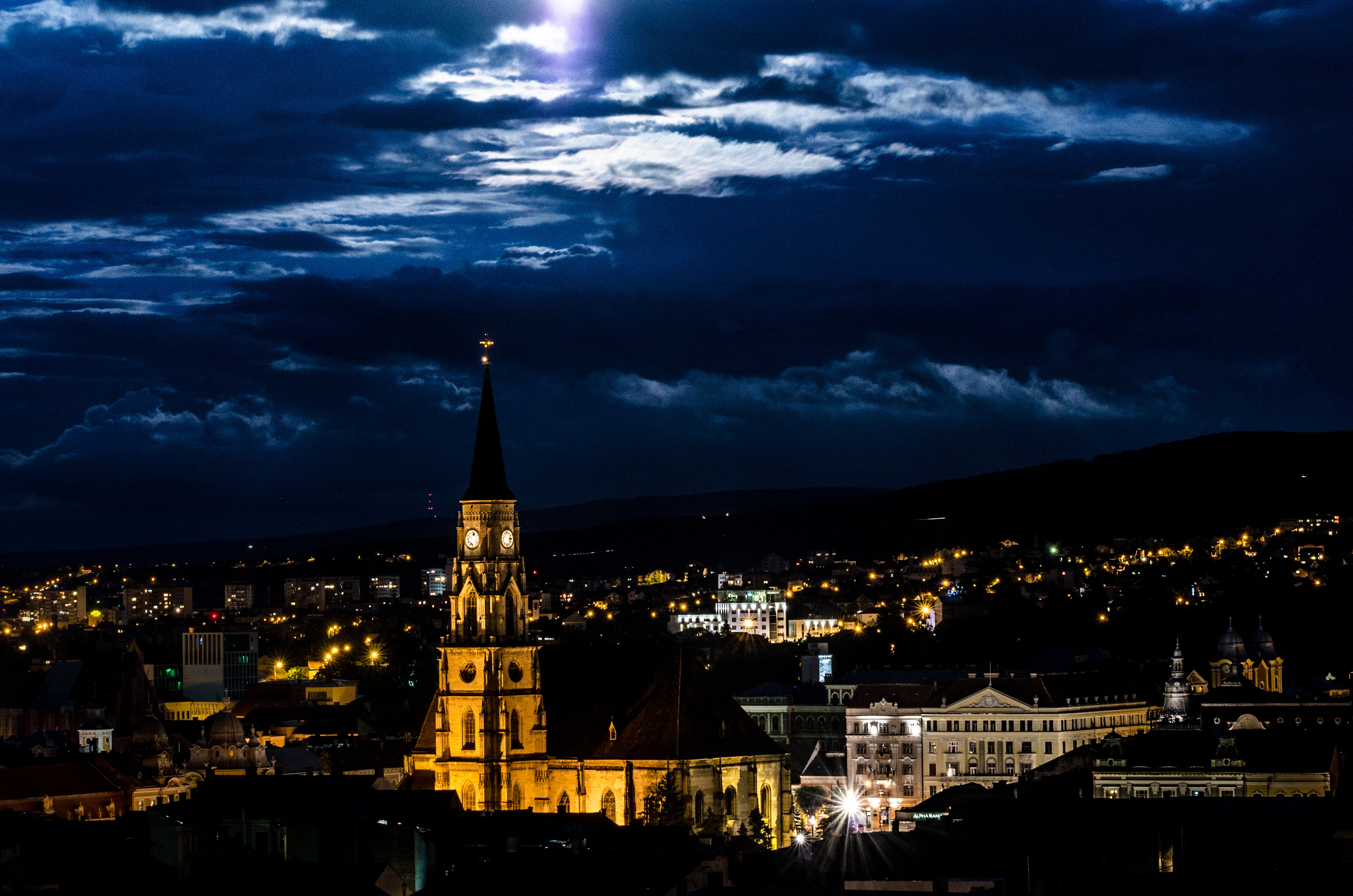
Klausenburg (Cluj-Napoca)

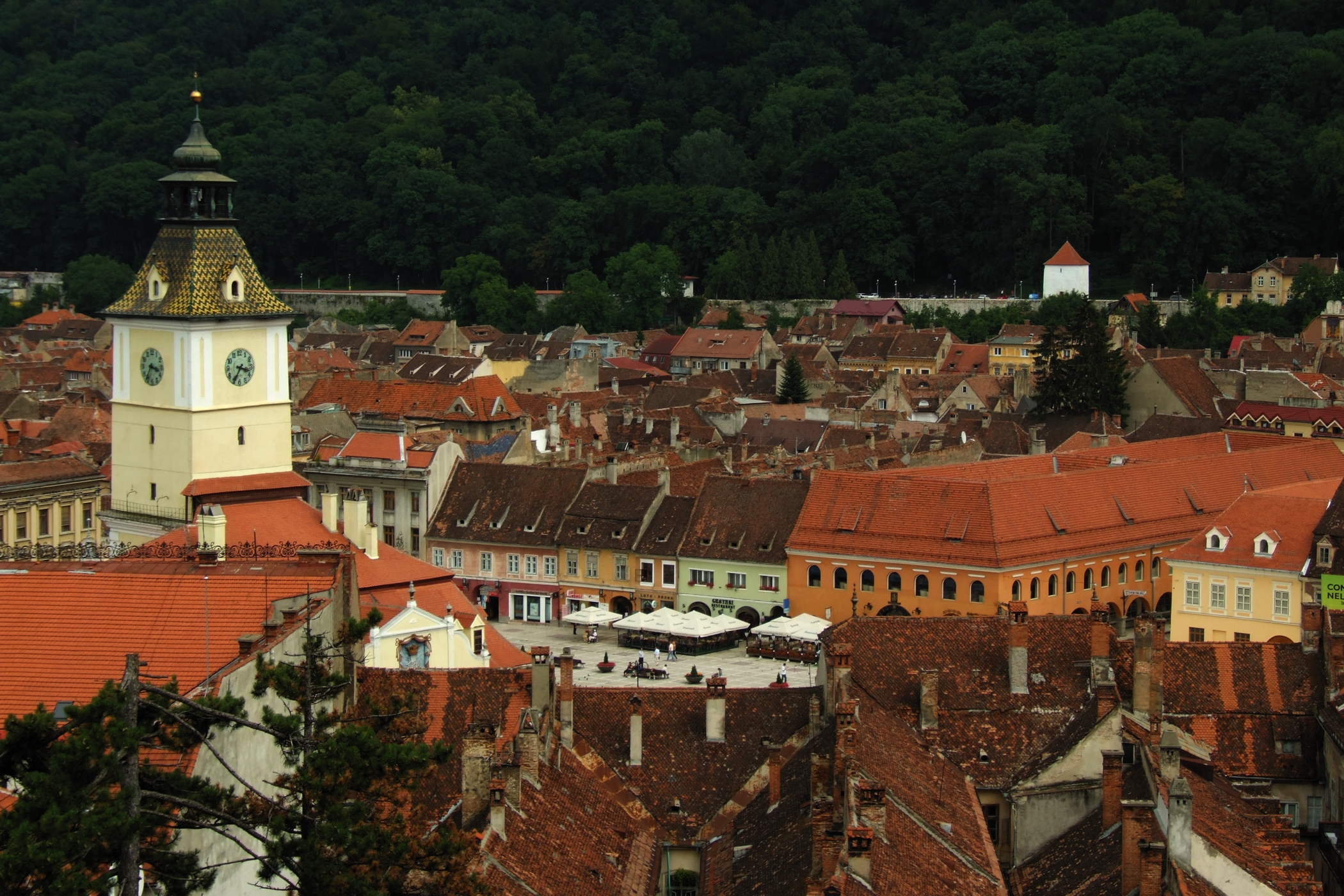
Kronstadt (Brașov)

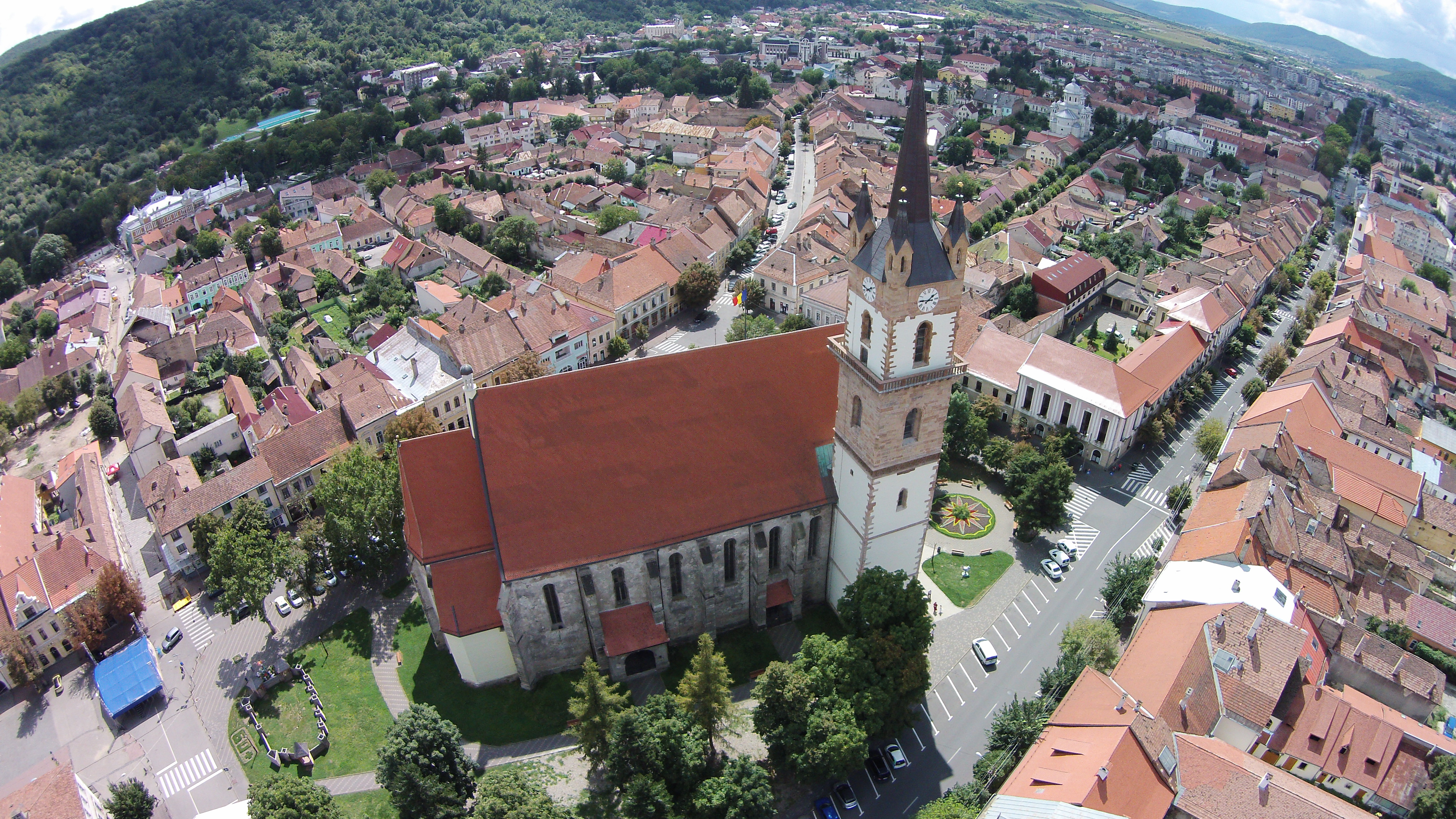
Bistritz (Bistrița)

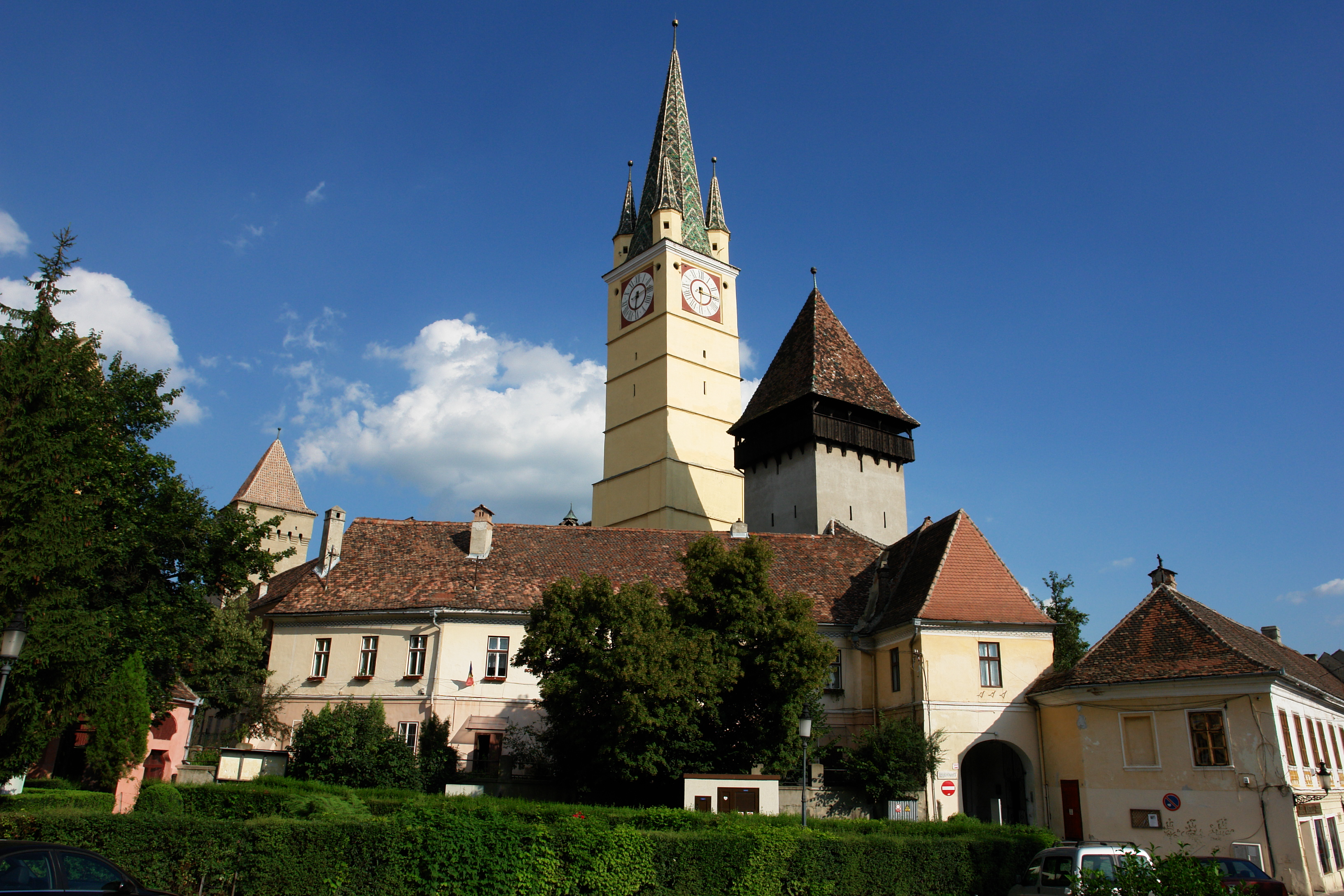
Mediasch (Mediaș)

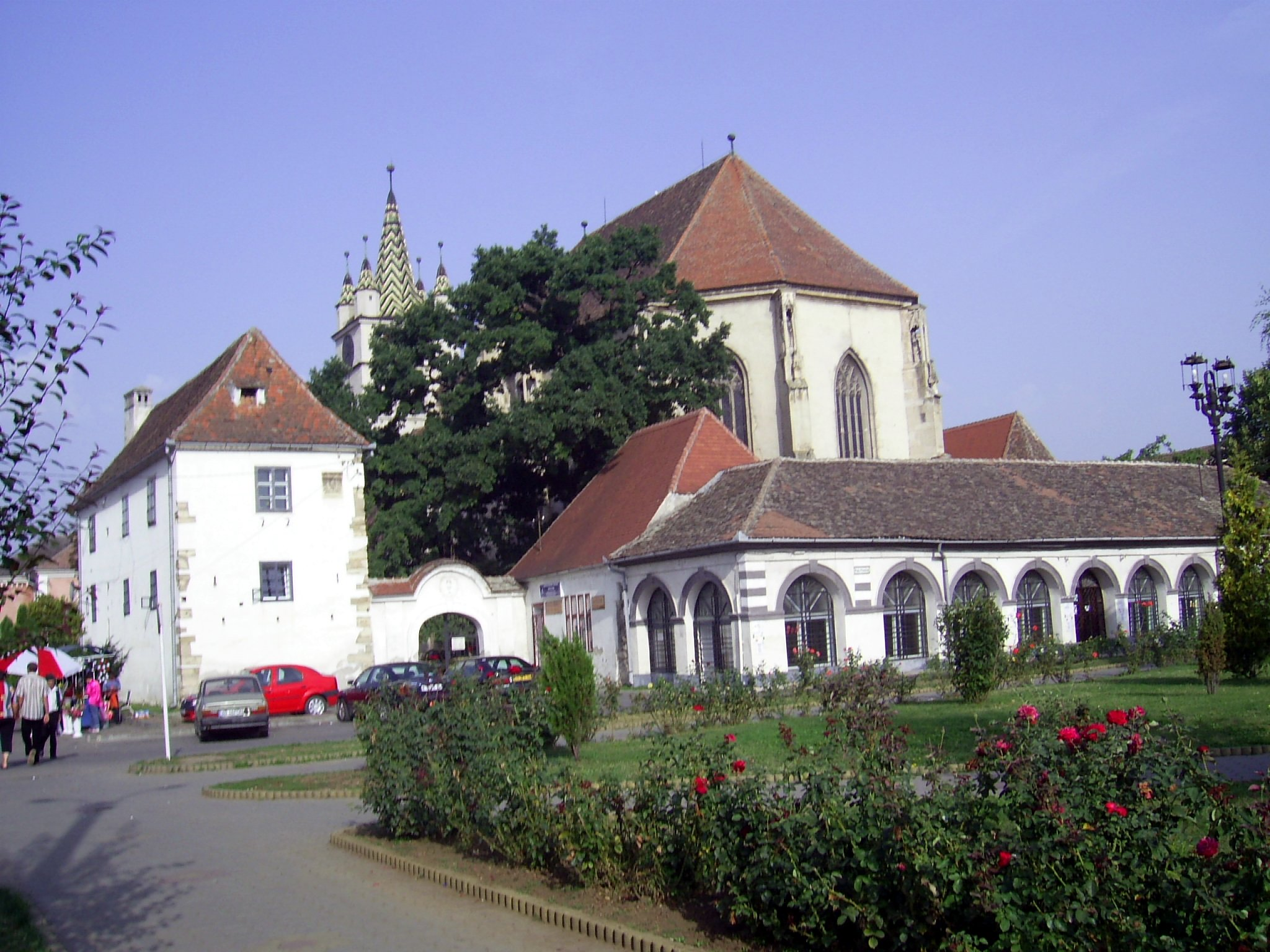
Mühlbach (Sebeș)

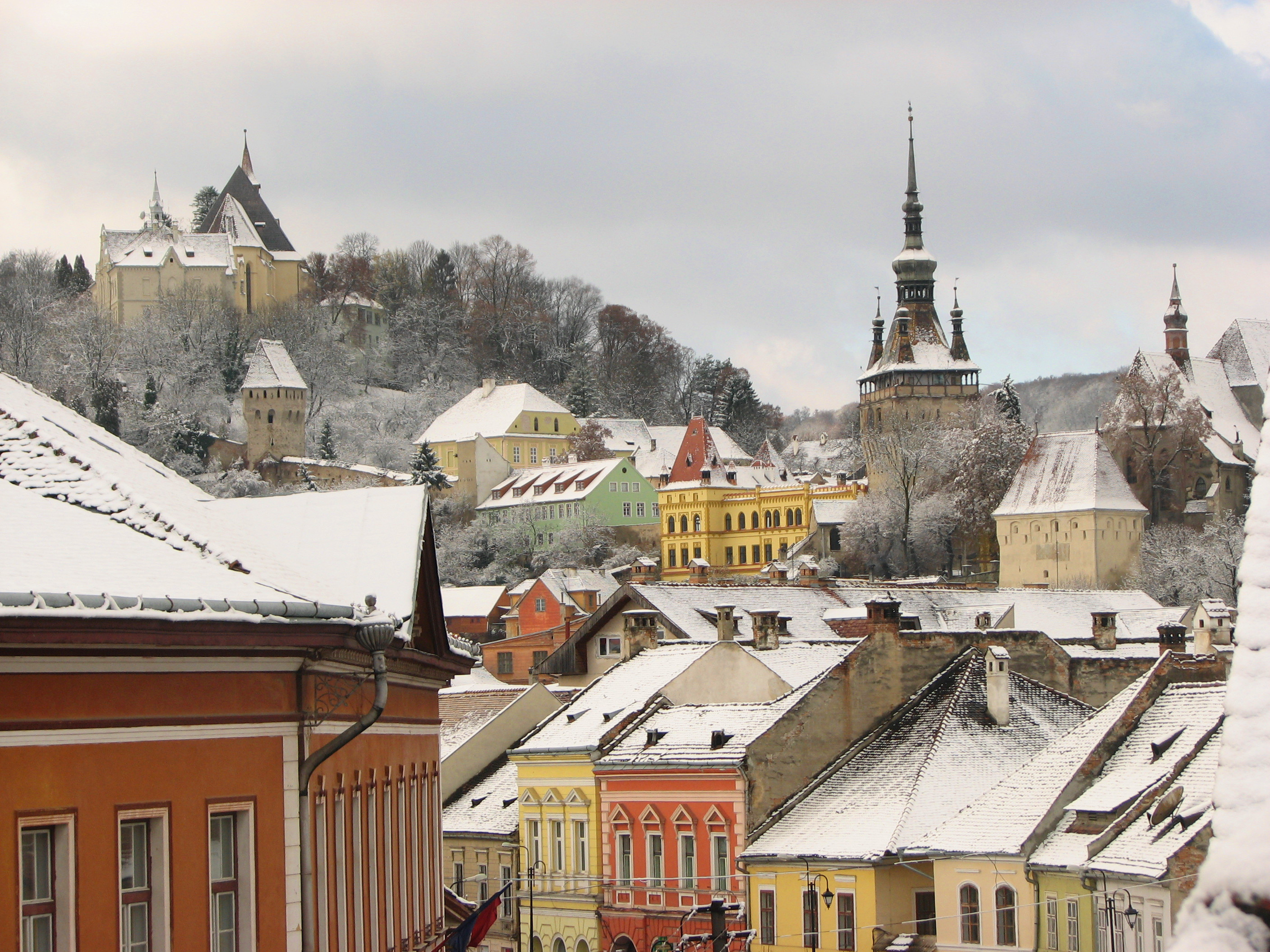
Schäßburg (Sighișoara)

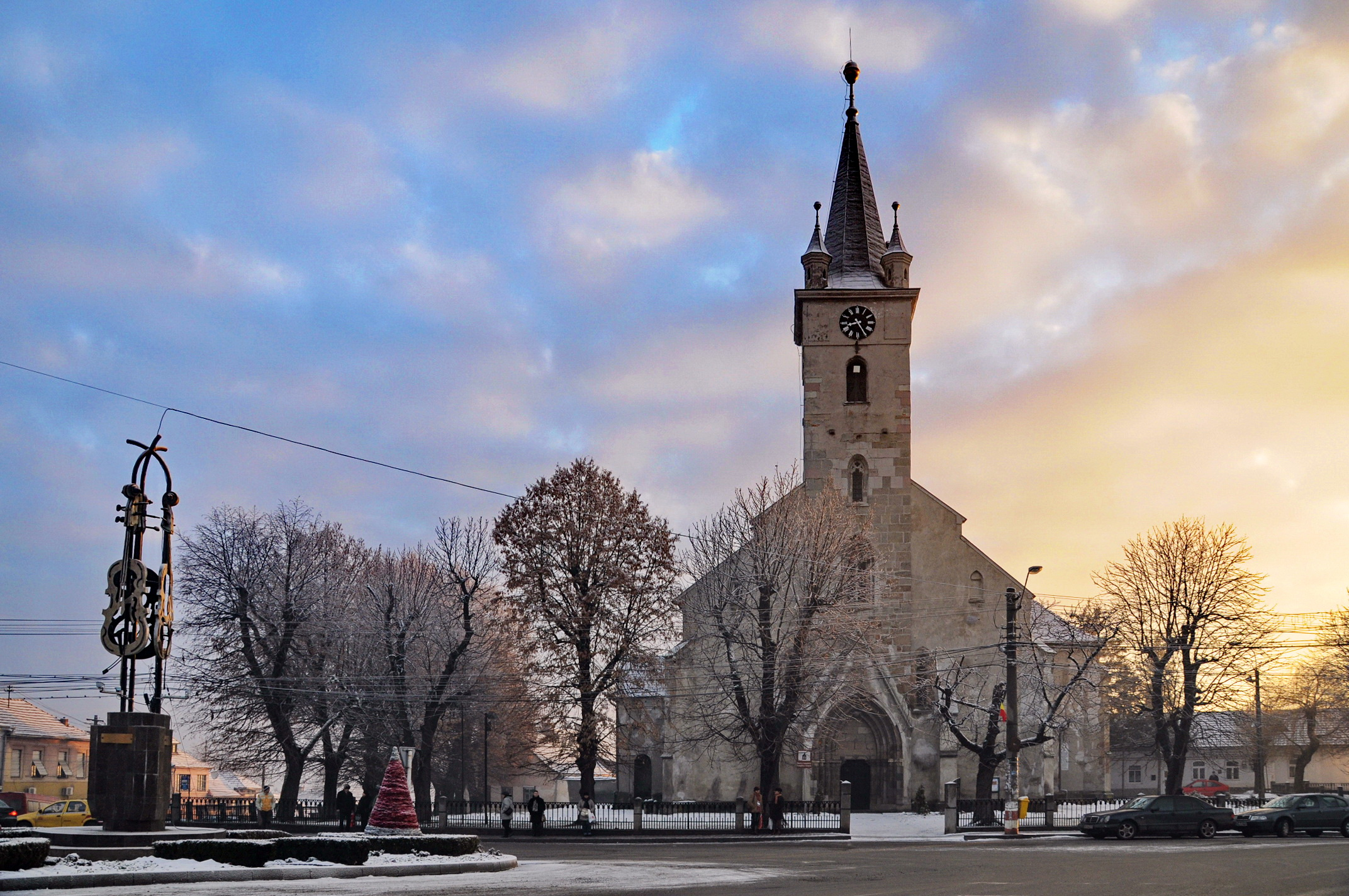
Sächsisch-Regen (Reghin)

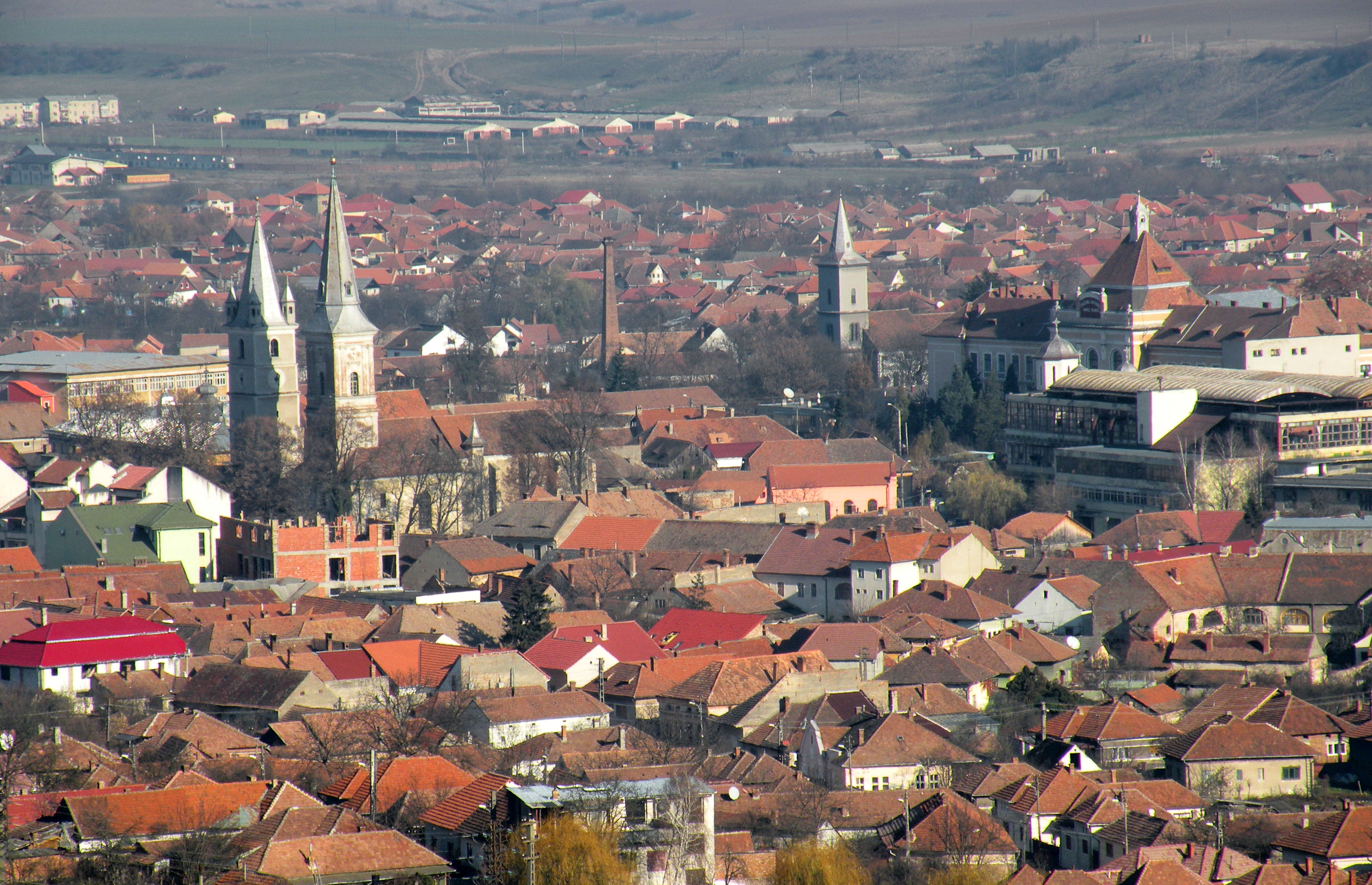
Broos (Orăștie)

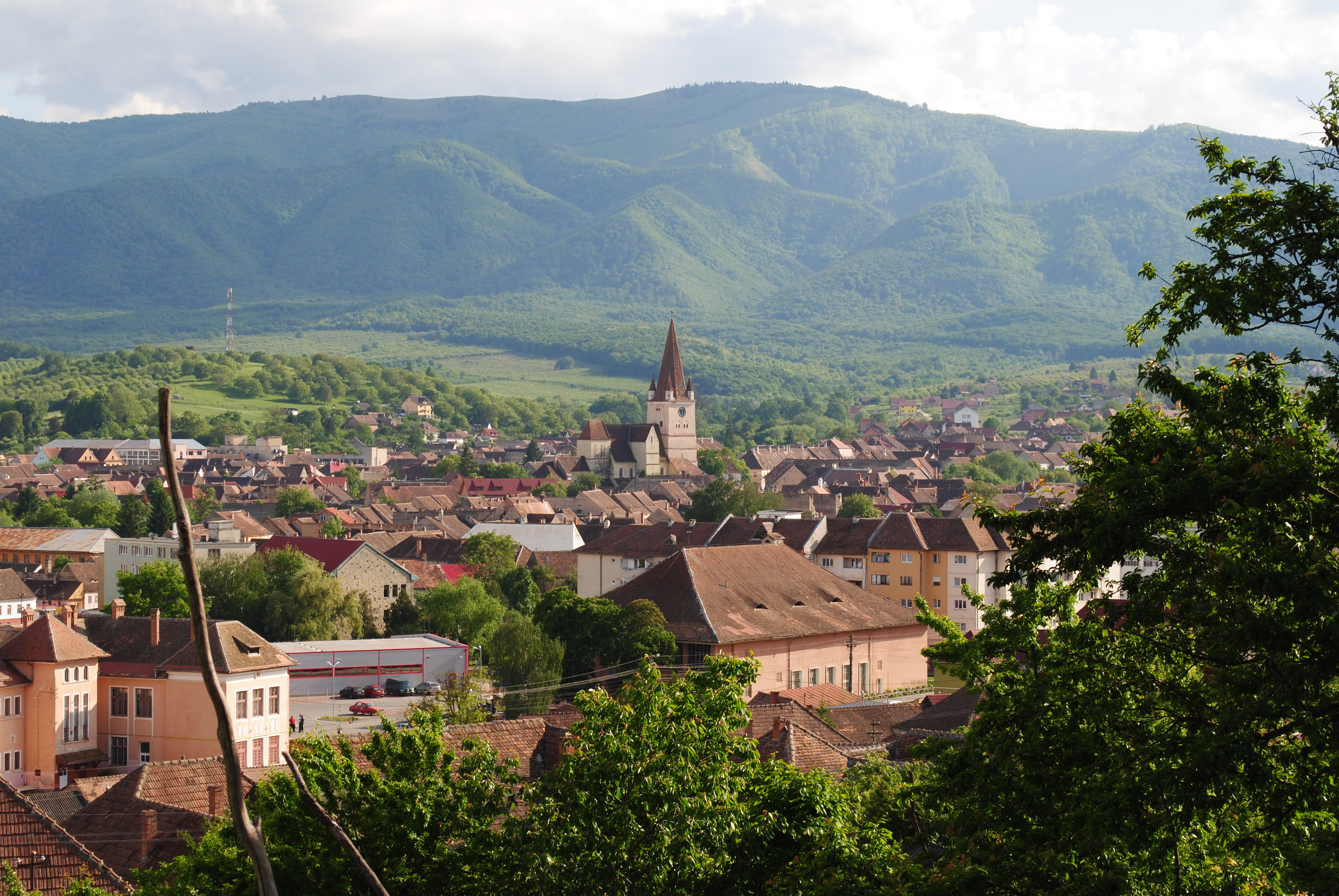
Heltau (Cisnădie)

== Fortification of the villages ==
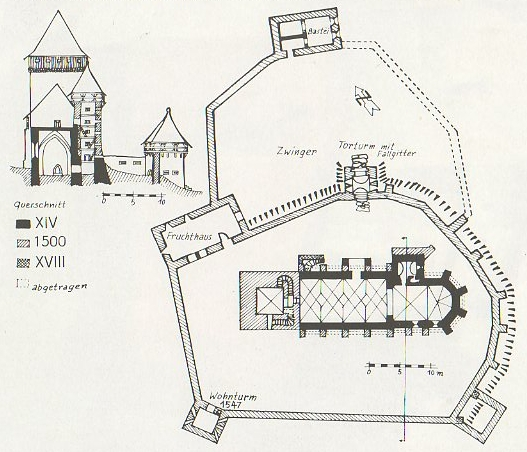
The plan for the medieval fortified church in Iacobeni (German: Jakobsdorf) in Sibiu County, a well preserved and prominent example of a Transylvanian Saxon fortified rural settlement.

In addition to fortifying their towns over the passing of time, the Transylvanian Saxons also had to fortify their villages by building their fortified churches (the Transylvanian Saxons were initially strongly Roman Catholic then Lutheran and, to a lesser extent, also Calvinist, after the Reformation).

These fortified churches, or kirchenburgen as they are known in standard German, had defensive capacities in the event of a foreign attack on a rural Transylvanian Saxon community (e.g. extensive inner and outer walls and a fortified watch tower). Such an attack would often stem from the Cumans, for example, or from the Pechenegs. It was estimated that there are approximately 300 such villages with fortified churches built by the Saxons in Transylvania during the Middle Ages.

The majority of them are still in very good to relatively good shape to this day, after further consolidation and renovation based on European funds or Norwegian grants (for example in Alma Vii or Laslea), but also based on foreign donations. Nevertheless, there also some still left in ruin or decay, since the vast majority of the Saxons in their respective villages left them deserted during either before 1989 and after 1989 while emigrating for Western Europe or North America.

== Medieval colonies outside the Carpathian arch ==
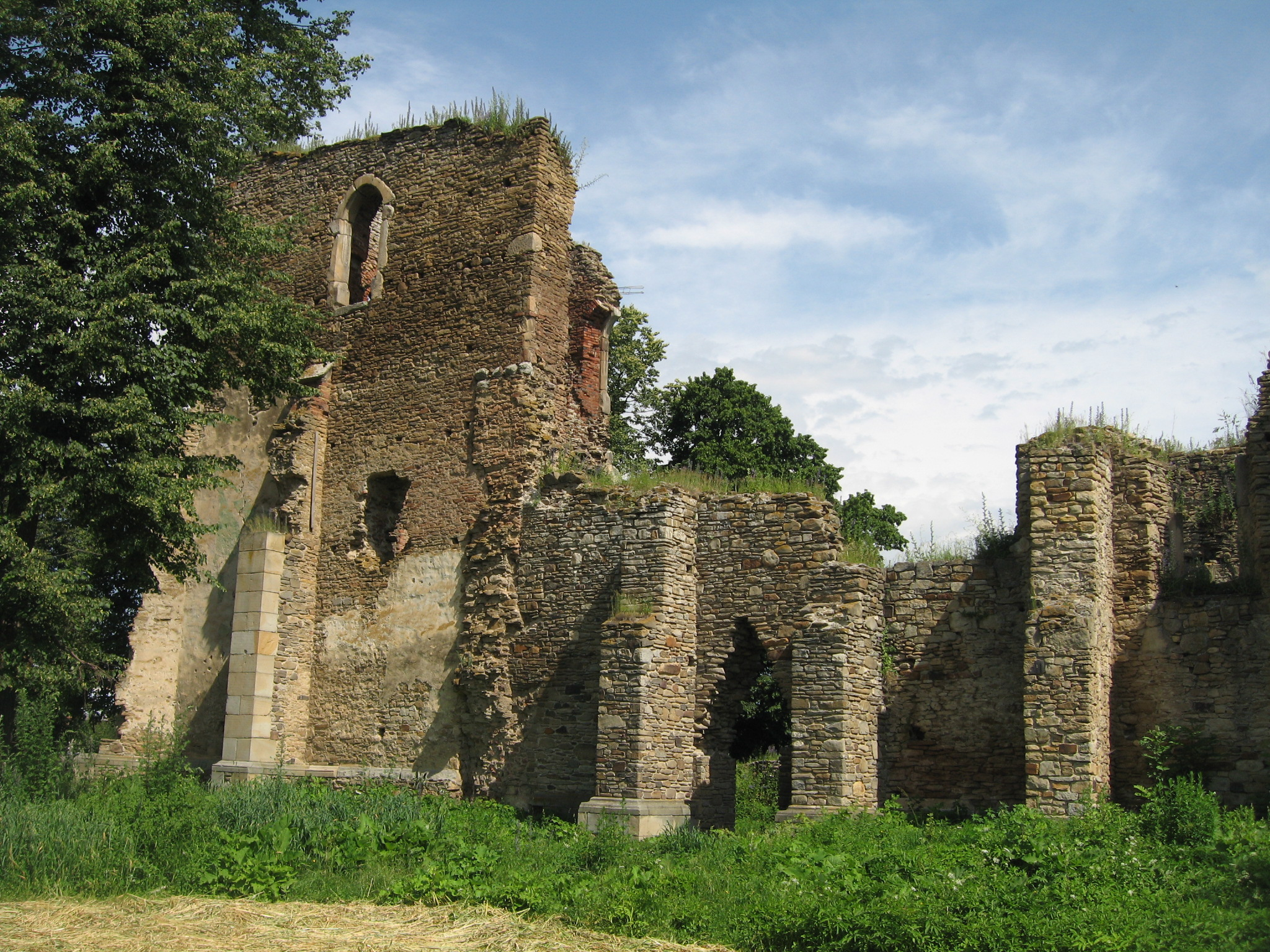
The ruins of the Roman Catholic cathedral to which the Transylvanian Saxons adhered in the past in Baia, situated in present-day Suceava County.

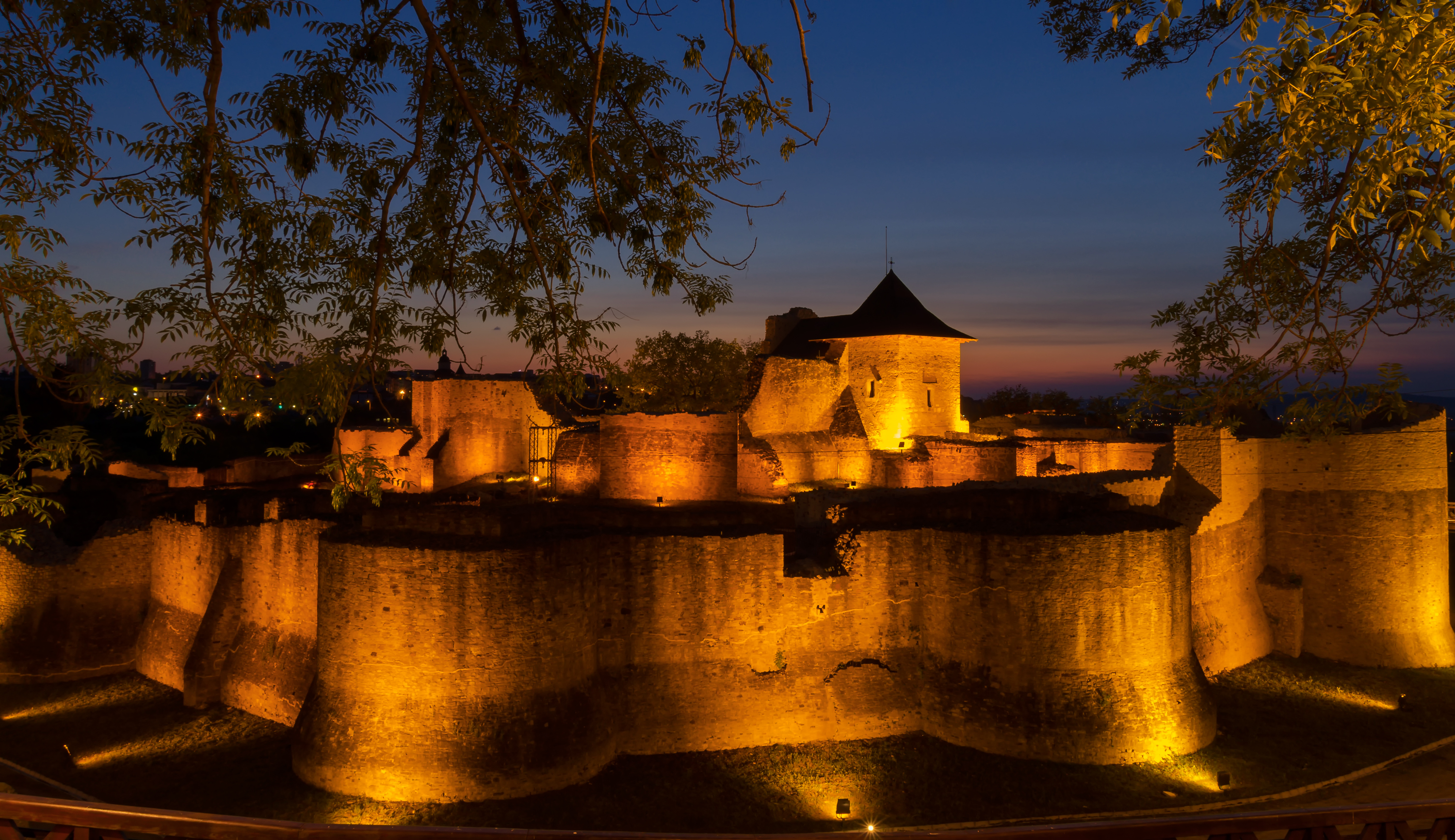
The medieval Romanian seat fortress of the former Principality of Moldavia which is situated in the town of Suceava, Suceava County, Bukovina, northeastern Romania.

The Transylvanian Saxons also colonized areas outside the Carpathian arch, and, implicitly, outside their then newly native lands across Transylvania starting in the mid and mid-late 12th century. Those areas pertained to the neighbouring and emerging Romanian medieval principalities of Moldavia (to the east) and Wallachia (to the south).

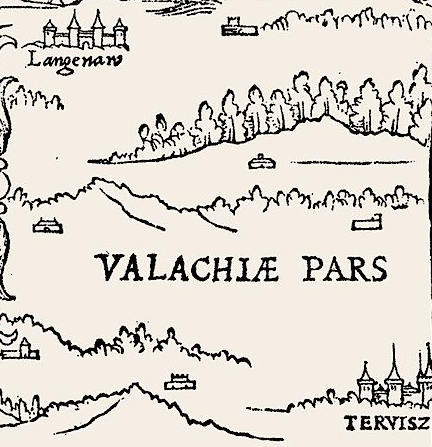
Câmpulung (Langenau) and Târgoviște (Tervisz) on Honterus' "Chorographia Tranylvaniae Sybembürgen"

In this particular process, they founded or co-founded major historical settlements on the territory of both aforementioned Romanian principalities such as Târgu Neamț (German: Niamtz), Baia (German: Stadt Molde or Moldennmarkt), Târgoviște (German: Tergowisch), or Câmpulung (German: Langenau). In the case of the first settlement (i.e. Târgu Neamț), they could have been equally helped in establishing it by the Teutonic Knights. Saxons in Wallachia also settled in Râmnic (i.e. present-day Râmnicu Vâlcea) and Pitești (German: Pitesk).

Saxon colonization in Moldavia had likely occurred through a crossing from the Bistrița area eastward and northward whereas Saxon colonization in Wallachia had likely occurred from the Sibiu (German: Hermannstadt) area. Moreover, under the title of Schultheiß (German: Șoltuz), ethnic Germans were even briefly in charge of some of these Romanian settlements during the High Middle Ages.

Additionally, German potters and merchants were also present in the former Moldavian capital of Suceava at the end of the 14th century. Historically, the town of Suceava has also been known in Old High German as Sedschopff. It is therefore known that Suceava had a small yet influent and thriving community of Transylvanian Saxons in medieval times.

The newly arrived Saxons outside the Carpathian arch in the emerging medieval Romanian principalities of Wallachia and Moldavia brought urbanisation, craftsmanship, trade, and the so-called German law, under which the local administrations of medieval Romanian towns had operated in the beginning.

In the medieval towns situated in the highlands of the Principality of Moldavia (or what would later become Bukovina starting in the Modern Age), namely Suceava or Câmpulung Moldovenesc (German: Kimpolung), the type of German town law which operated there was the Magdeburg law. Furthermore, the Teutonic Knights were also present in Siret (German: Sereth) where they built a fortress on a hill near the town during the early 13th century.

However, throughout the passing of time, demographically, their numbers gradually dwindled and were subsequently assimilated in the local Wallachian and Moldavian cultures by the overwhelming Romanian ethnic majority.

== Status of privileged class in Transylvania ==
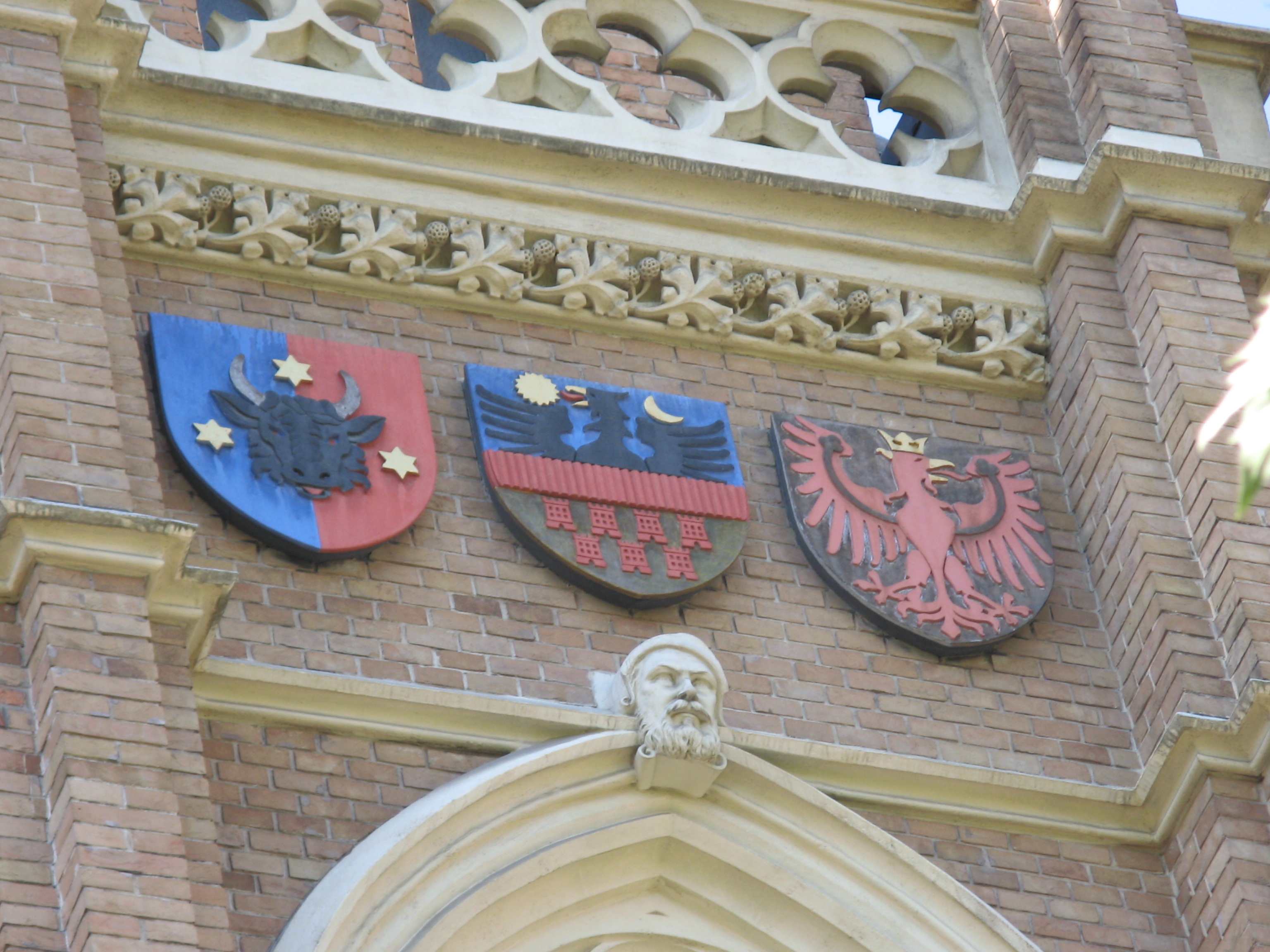
The coat of arms of Bukovina, Transylvania, and South Tyrol on the Akademischen Gymnasium in Vienna, Austria, highlighting the common former Habsburg and Austrian heritage of all three regions.

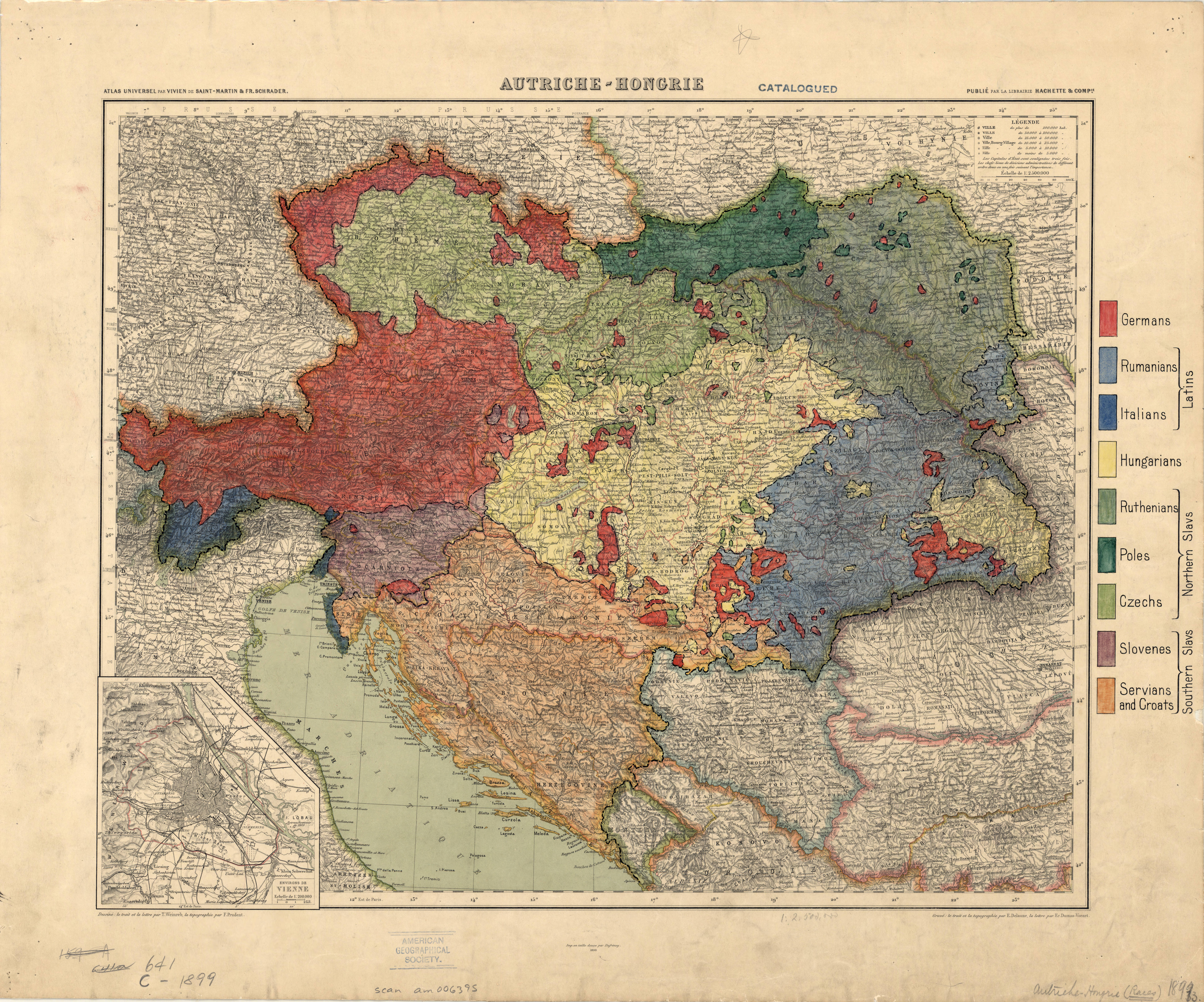
1899 ethnographic map of Austria-Hungary, highlighting territories inhabited by the Transylvanian Saxons (and other Germans) in red.

Along with the largely Hungarian-Transylvanian nobility and the Székelys, the Transylvanian Saxons were members of the Unio Trium Nationum (or 'Union of the Three Nations'), which was a charter signed in 1438. This agreement preserved a considerable degree of political rights for the three aforementioned groups but excluded the largely Hungarian and Romanian peasantry from political life in the principality.

During the Protestant Reformation, most Transylvanian Saxons converted to Lutheranism. As the semi-independent Principality of Transylvania was one of the most religiously tolerant states in Europe at the time, the Saxons were allowed to practice their own religion (meaning that they enjoyed religious autonomy). However, the Habsburgs still promoted Roman Catholicism to the Saxons during the Counter-Reformation. Currently in Romania, about 60% of ethnic Germans reported being Roman Catholic and 40% Protestant (see Religion in Romania).

Warfare between the Habsburg monarchy and Hungary against the Ottoman Empire from the 16th–18th centuries decreased the population of Transylvanian Saxons. All throughout this period of time, the Saxons in Transylvania served as administrators and military officers. When the Principality of Transylvania came under Habsburg control, a smaller third phase of settlement took place to revitalise their demographics.

This wave of settlement included exiled Protestants from Upper Austria (the Transylvanian Landlers namely), who were given land near Hermannstadt (Sibiu). The predominantly German-populated Hermannstadt was a noteworthy cultural center within Transylvania in the past, while Kronstadt (Brașov) represented a vital political center for the Transylvanian Saxons. Brașov/Kronstadt was more populous compared to Sibiu/Hermannstadt but historically the latter remained the most important town in Transylvania for the Transylvanian Saxons (as a well as a very important town for the Transylvanian Romanians).

== Loss of elite status and unification with the Kingdom of Romania ==
Emperor Joseph II attempted to revoke the Unio Trium Nationum in the late 18th century. His actions were aimed at the political inequality within Transylvania, especially the political strength of the Saxons. Although his actions were ultimately rescinded, many Saxons began to see themselves as being a small minority opposed by nationalist Romanians and Hungarians. Although they remained a rich and influential group, the Saxons were no longer a dominant class within Modern Age Transylvania.

The Hungarians, on the other hand, supported complete unification of Transylvania with the rest of Hungary. Stephan Ludwig Roth, a Lutheran pastor and intellectual who led the German support for Romanian political rights, eventually opposed the unification of Transylvania with Hungary and was executed by the Hungarian military tribunal during the revolution.

The militia banner of the Saxons from Heldsdorf (Romanian: Hălchiu), Brașov County during the 1848–49 Hungarian Revolution

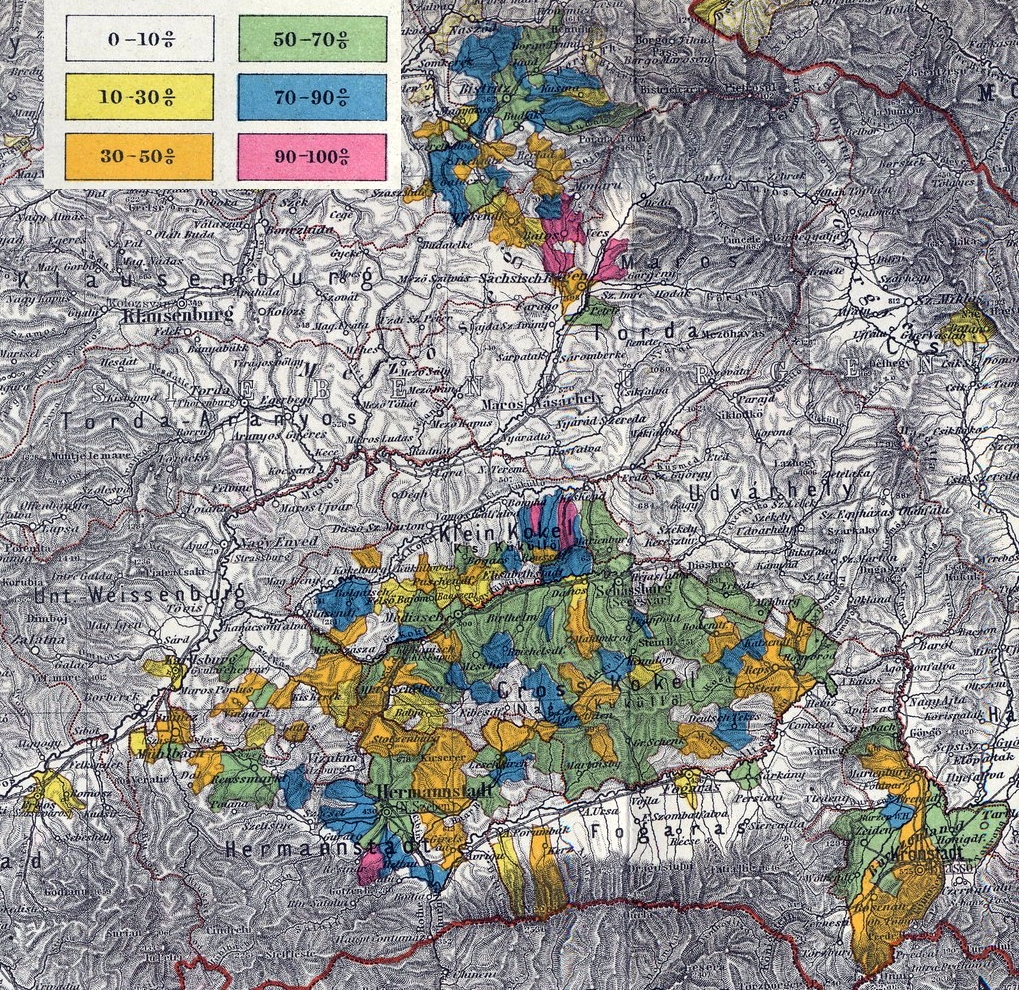
Distribution of Saxons in Transylvania at the end of the 19th century

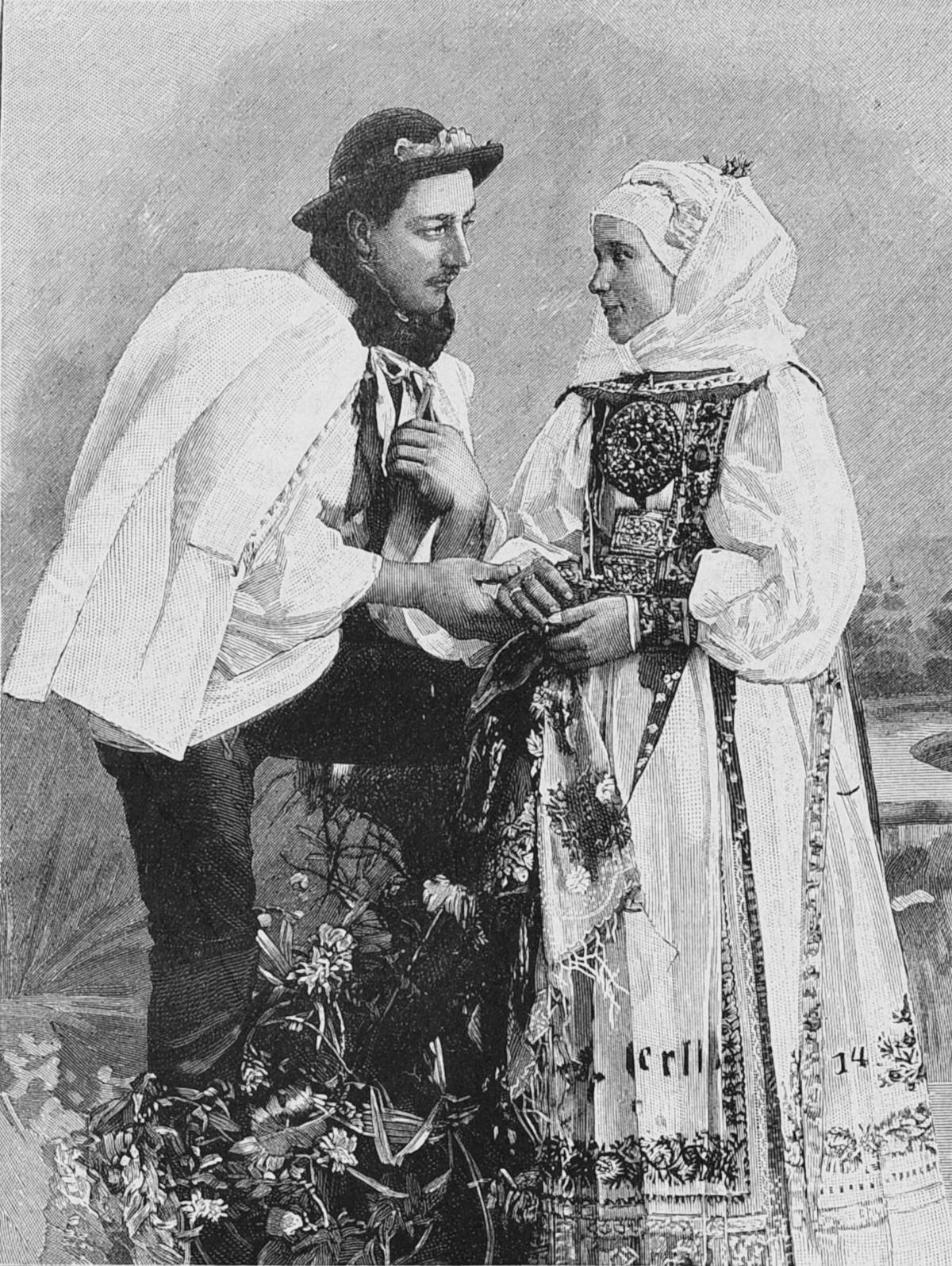
Saxon couple (late 19th century illustration)

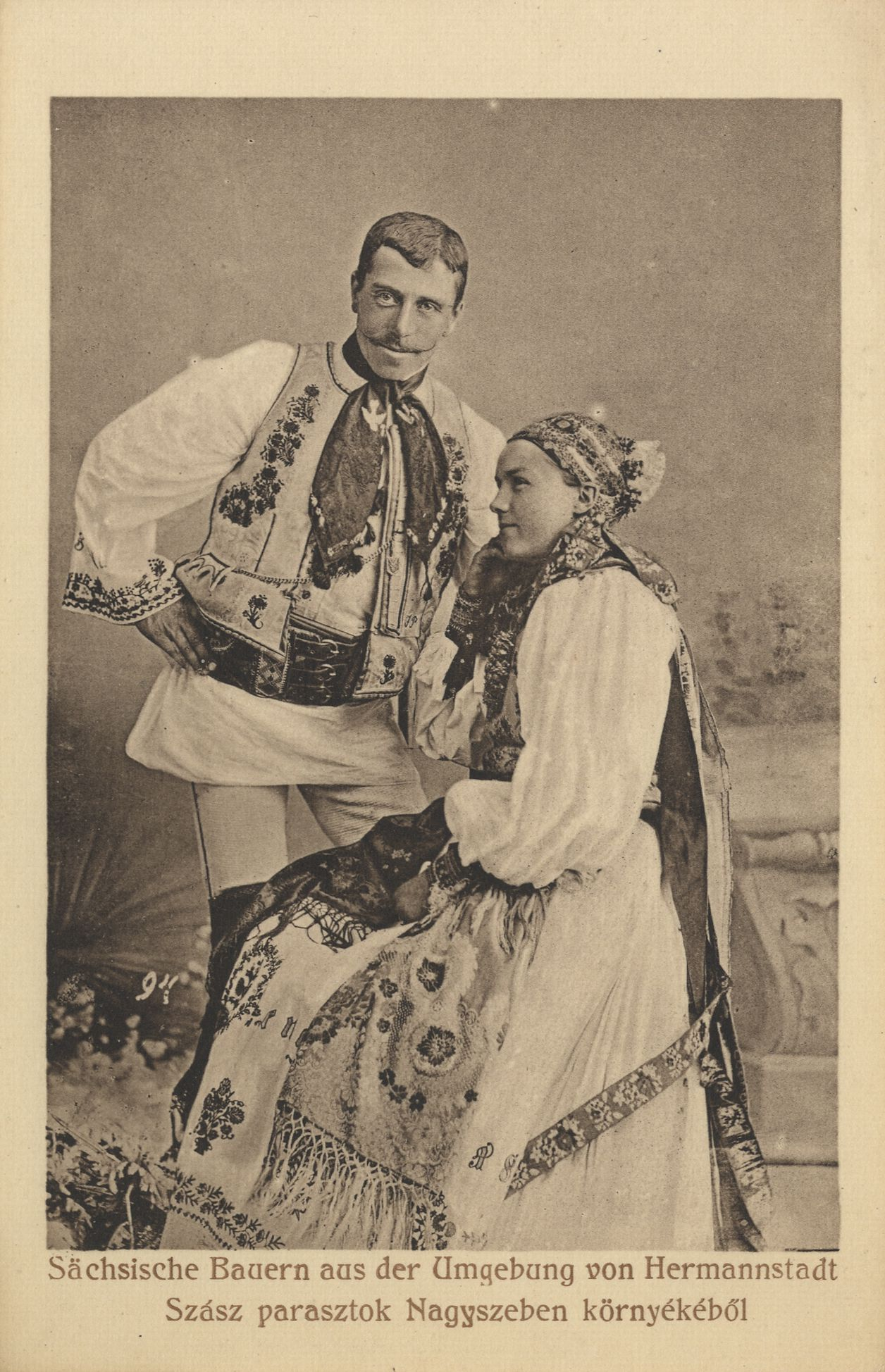
Saxon couple from Sibiu/Hermannstadt area, c. 1900

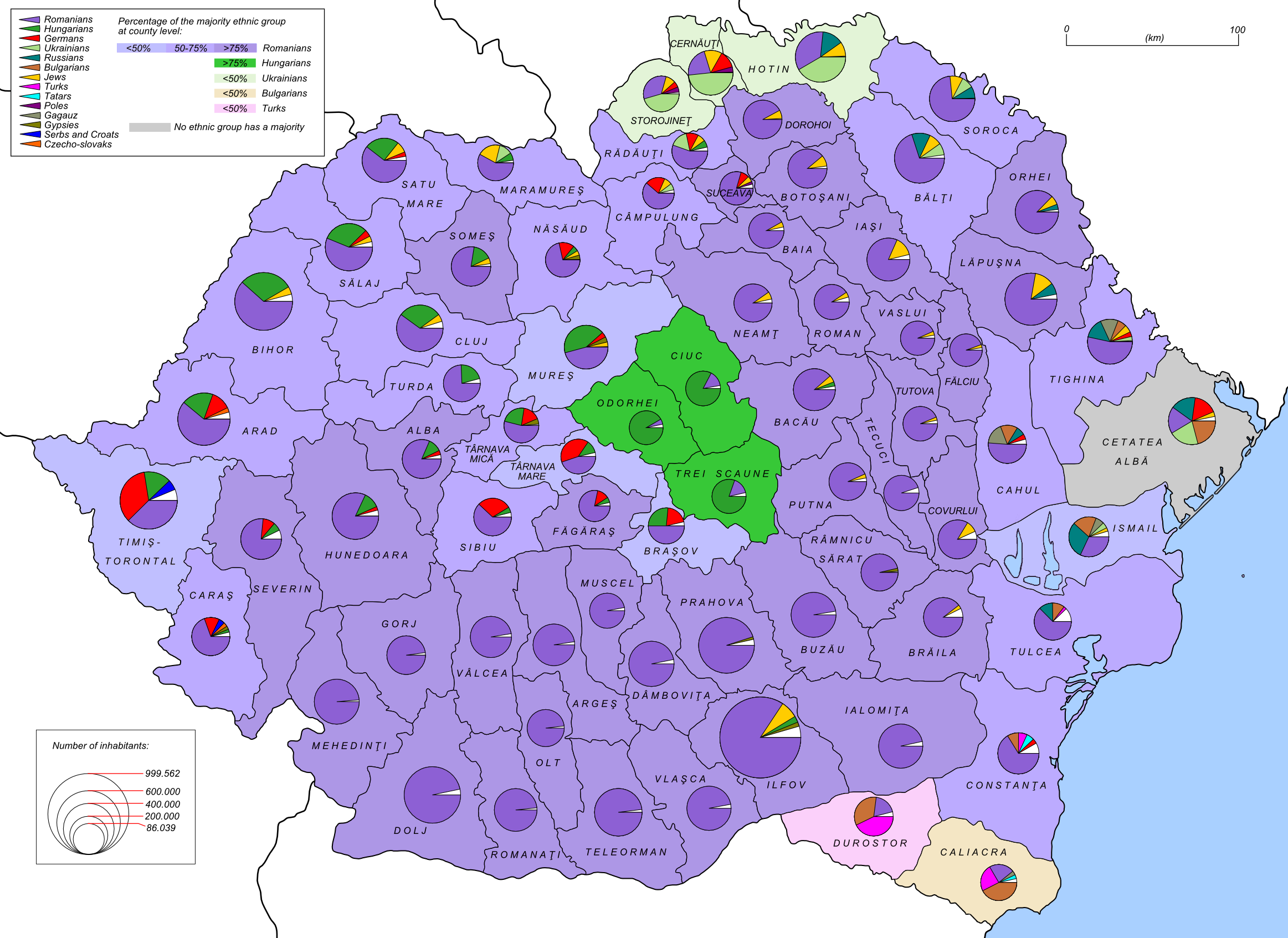
Ethnic map of Romania in 1930. The Transylvanian Saxons (coloured in red) had a sizeable ethnic presence in the Sibiu, Târnava Mare, Târnava Mică, Făgăraș, Brașov, and Năsăud counties.

Although the Hungarian control over Transylvania was defeated by Austrian and Imperial Russian forces in 1849, the Austro-Hungarian Compromise of 1867 (German: Ausgleich) between Austria and Hungary did not represent a positive transformation for the political rights of the Transylvanian Saxons.

After the end of World War I, on 8 January 1919, the representatives of the Transylvanian Saxons decided to support the unification of Transylvania with the Kingdom of Romania, as did other German groups in the newly enlarged state (e.g. Bessarabia or Bukovina Germans). They were promised full minority rights, but many wealthy Saxons lost part of their land in the land reform process that was implemented in the whole of Romania after World War I. Subsequently, taking into account the rise of Adolf Hitler in Nazi Germany, many Transylvanian Saxons became staunch supporters of national socialism, with the Evangelical Lutheran Church gradually losing very much of its influence in the community, shortly before and during the outbreak of World War II.

== World War II and contemporary history ==
In February 1942 and May 1943, Germany concluded agreements with Hungary and Romania respectively, following which the Germans who were fit for military service, although they were either Hungarian citizens (in northern Transylvania, entered the composition of the Hungarian state through the Second Vienna Award) or Romanian citizens (in southern Transylvania, remaining part of Romania), could be incorporated into the regular German military units, into the Waffen-SS and into war-producing enterprises or into the Organisation Todt.

As a result of these agreements, approximately 95% of the members of the German ethnic group who were fit for military service (Transylvanian Saxons and Banat Swabians) voluntarily enrolled into the Waffen-SS units (approximately 63,000 people), with several thousand serving in the special units of the SS Security Service (SD-Sonderkommandos), of which at least 2,000 ethnic Germans were enrolled in the concentration camps (KZ-Wachkompanien), of which at least 55% served in extermination camps, predominantly in Auschwitz and Lublin. About 15% of the Romanian ethnic Germans who served in the Waffen-SS died in the war, with only a few thousand survivors returning to Romania.

When Romania signed a peace treaty with the Soviets in 1944, the German military began withdrawing the Saxons from Transylvania; this operation was most thorough with the Saxons of the Nösnerland (Bistrița area). Around 100,000 Germans fled before the advance of the Soviet Red Army, but Romania did not conduct the expulsion of Germans as did neighboring countries at war's end. However, more than 70,000 Germans from Romania were arrested by the Soviet Army and sent to labour camps in Ukraine (more specifically in Donbas) for alleged cooperation with Nazi Germany.

Dance groups during the 2024 annual gathering of Transylvanian Saxons in Dinkelsbühl, a small town in Bavaria, Germany.

In 1989, there were still 95,000 Saxons living in Romania (approx. 40% of the population of 1910), and between 1991 and 1992 another 75,000 emigrated. Their number shrank to 14,770 according to the data provided by the Evangelical Church of the Augsburg Confession in Romania in 2003.

Because they are considered Auslandsdeutsche ("Germans from abroad") by the German government, the Saxons have the right to German citizenship under the law of return. Numerous Saxons have emigrated to Germany, especially after the fall of the Eastern Bloc in 1989 and are represented by the Association of Transylvanian Saxons in Germany.

The official logo of the Democratic Forum of Germans in Romania (FDGR/DFDR), one of the oldest still functioning political platforms in post-1989 Romania.

Because of this constant emigration from Romania, the population of Saxons has been gradually dwindling. At the same time, especially after Romania's accession to NATO and the EU, many Transylvanian Saxons are returning from Germany, reclaiming property lost to the former communist regime and/or starting up small and medium-sized enterprises. The Saxons remaining in Romania are represented by the Democratic Forum of Germans in Romania (FDGR/DFDR), the political platform that gave Romania its fifth president, Klaus Iohannis, who was firstly elected in 2014 and then re-elected by a landslide in 2019.

== Culture ==
Before their expulsion from communist Romania by communist and securist Romanian authorities, the Transylvanian Saxons formed distinct communities in their towns and villages, where they maintained their ethnic tradition characterised by specific customs, folklore, way of life, and distinctive clothing style (i.e. national costumes or Sächsische Trachten). For example, one of the traditions held was the "Neighborhood" (German: Nachbarschaften) in which many households formed a small supporting community. This, according to some scholars, is of ancient German origin.

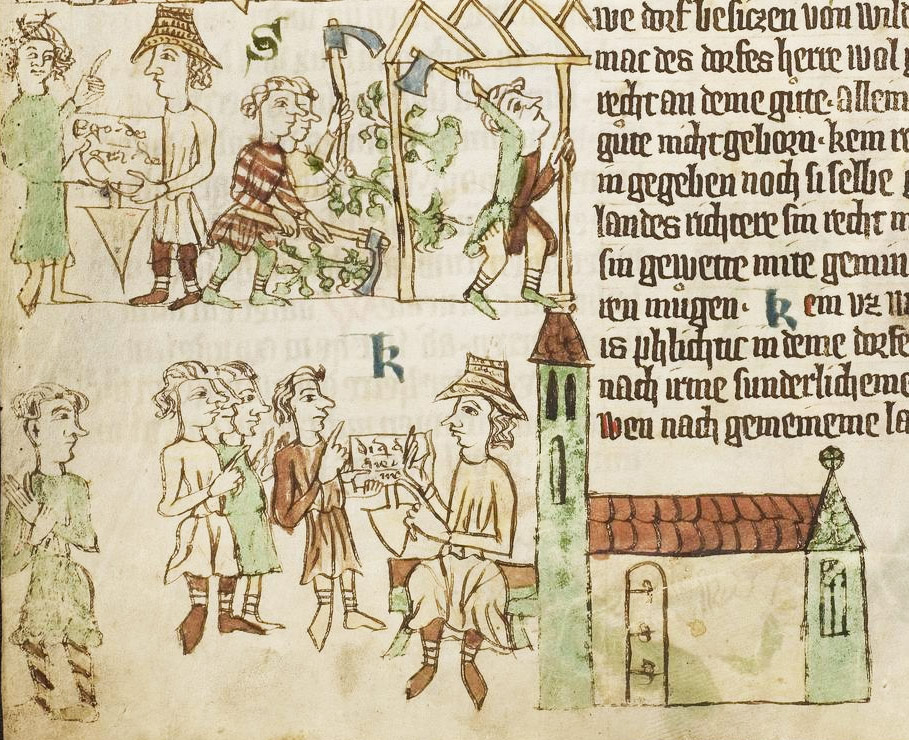
The Sachsenspiegel depicting the Ostsiedlung process. Upper part: the locator (with a special hat) receives the foundation charter from the landlord. The settlers clear the forest and build houses. Lower part: the locator acts as the judge in the village.

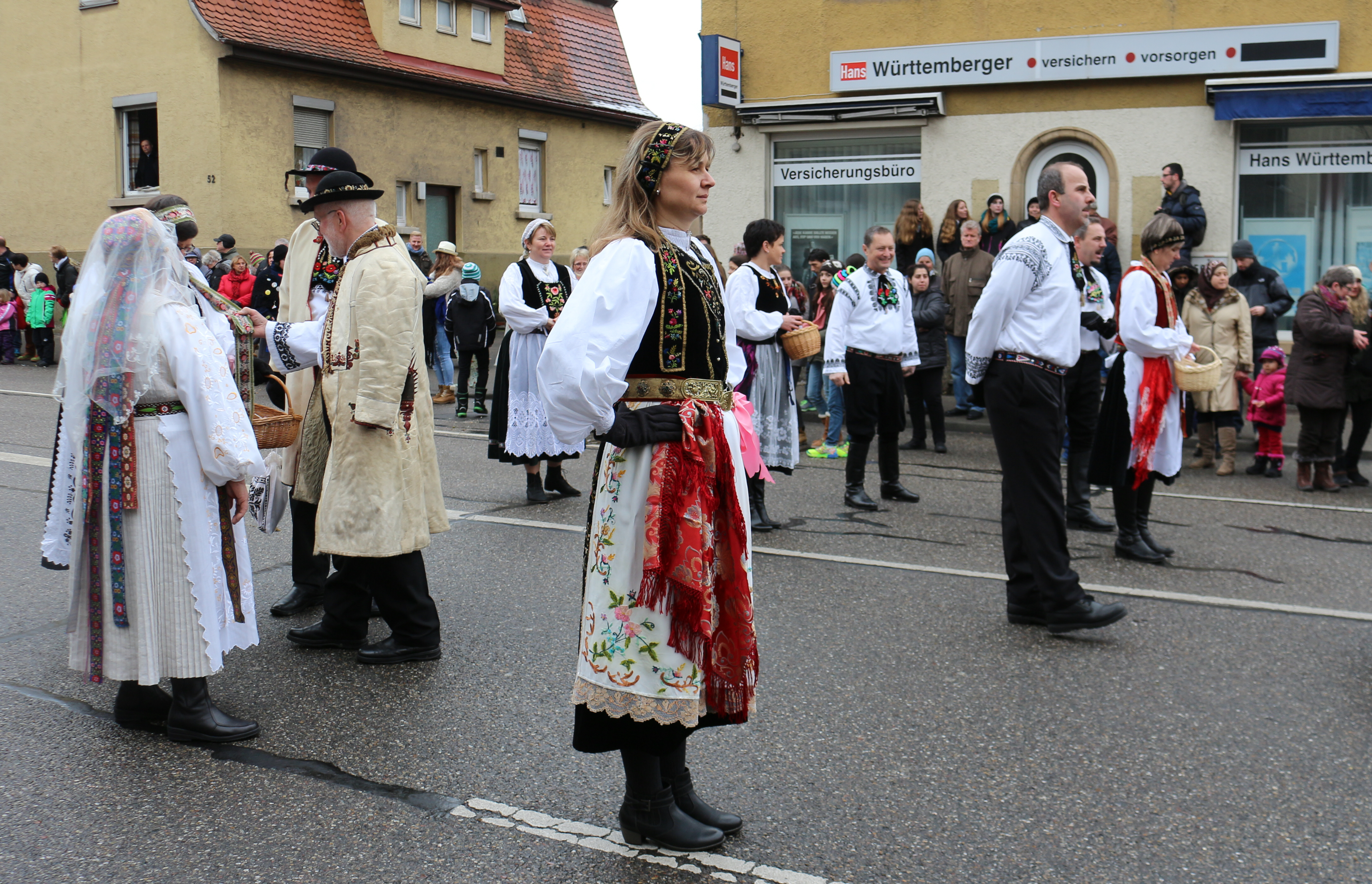
National costumes of the Transylvanian Saxons at a folk dance performed in Germany (February 2015)

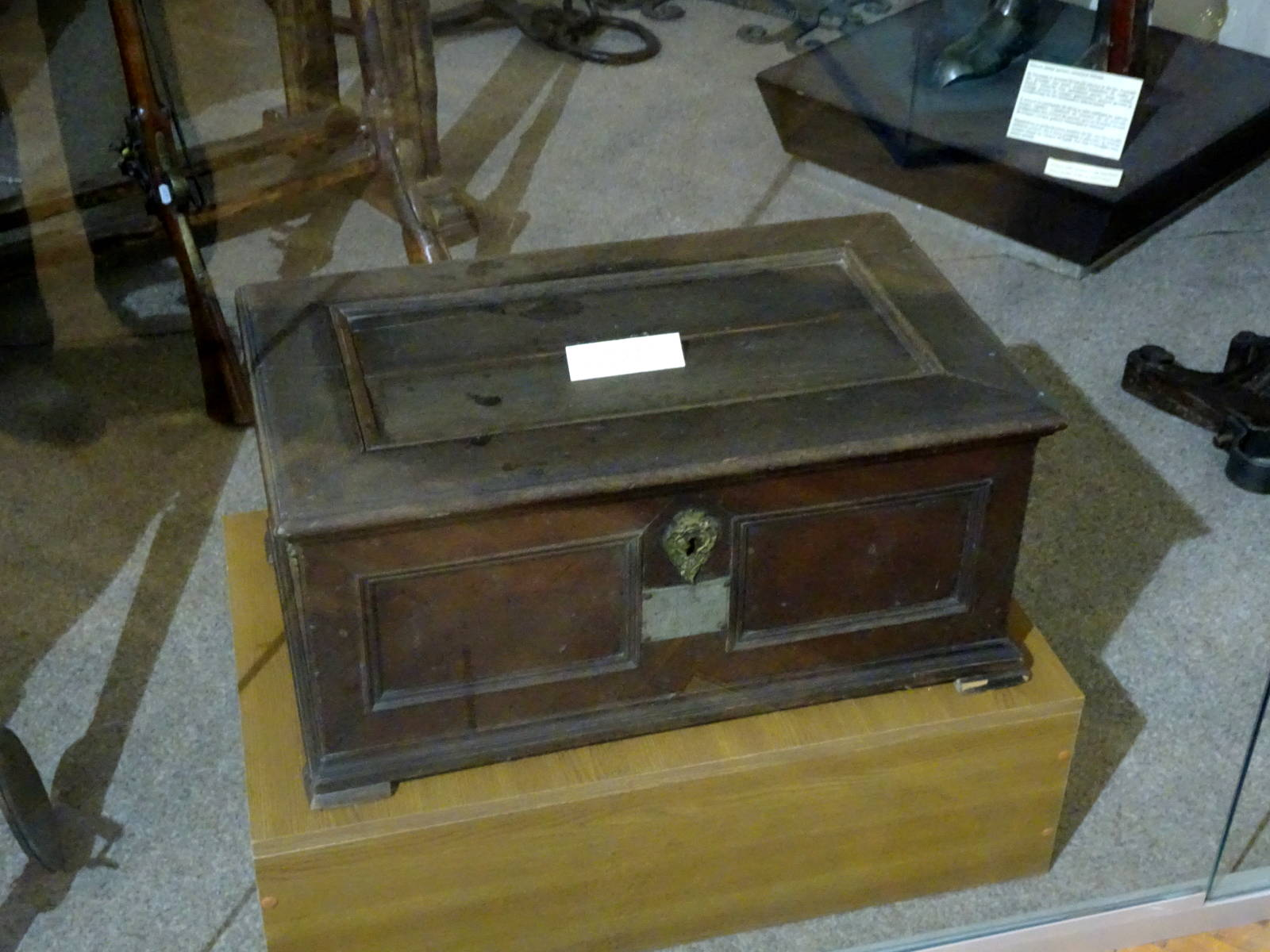
The "community chest" (German: Nachbarschaftskasten) in which the Saxon fraternity held their documents

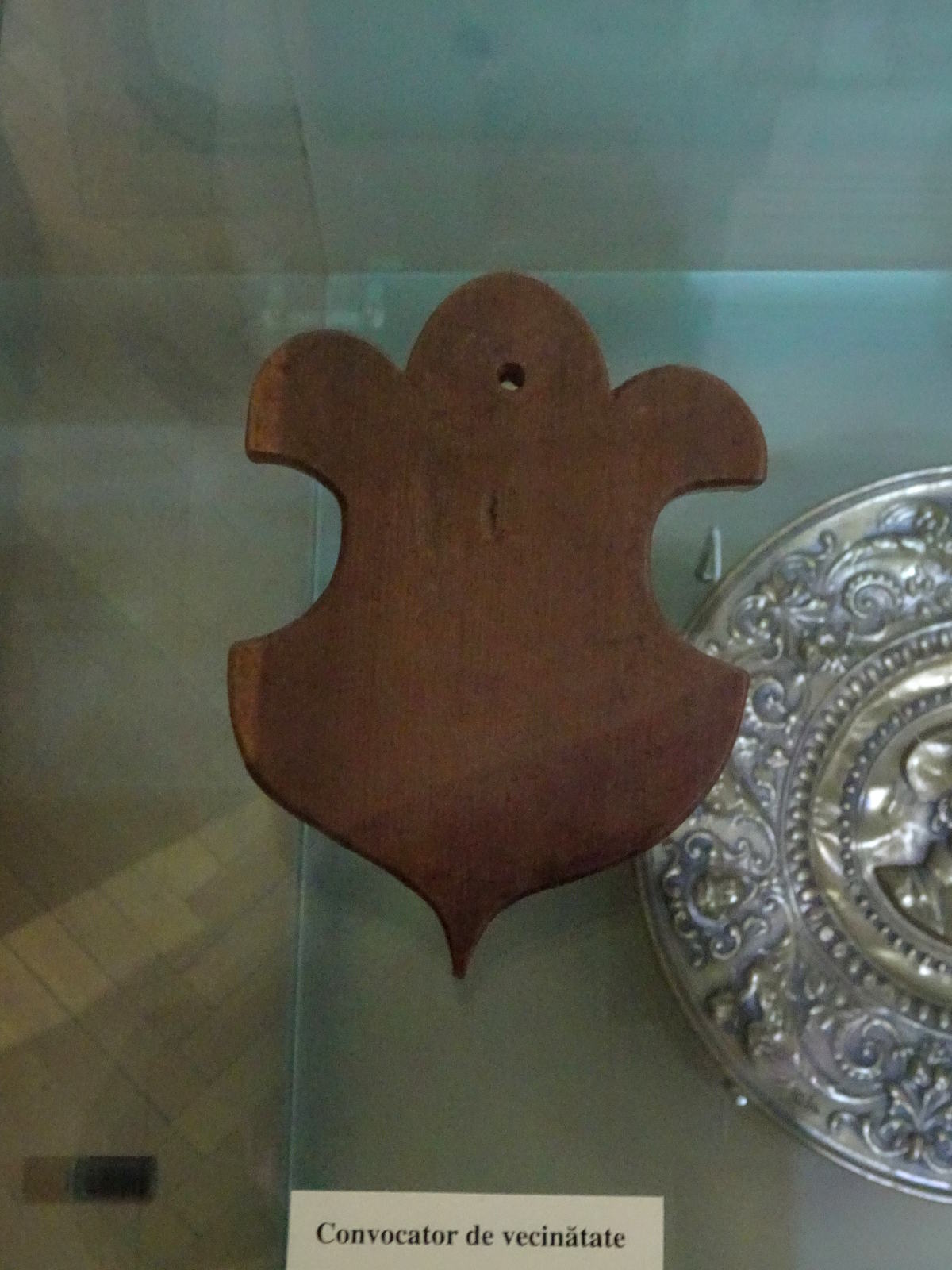
The "community badge" (German: Nachbarschaft Convener)

The historical coat of arms of the Transylvanian Saxons (Note: As depicted for the Saxon University (German: Sächsische Nationsuniversität, Latin: Universitas Saxonum, Romanian: Universitatea Săsească))

Alternative historical coat of arms of the Transylvanian Saxons

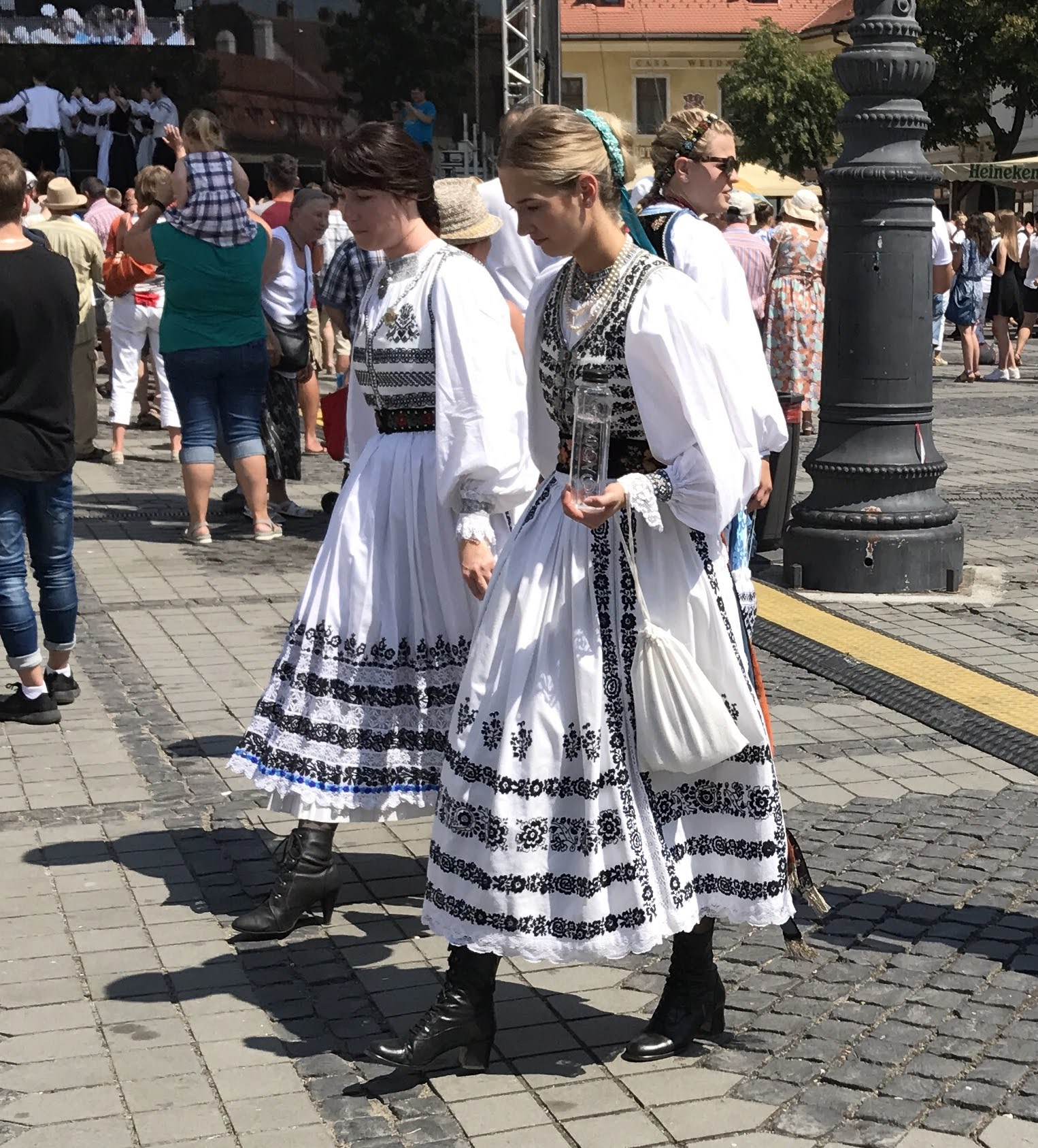
Transylvanian Saxon women in traditional costumes attempting a folk dance

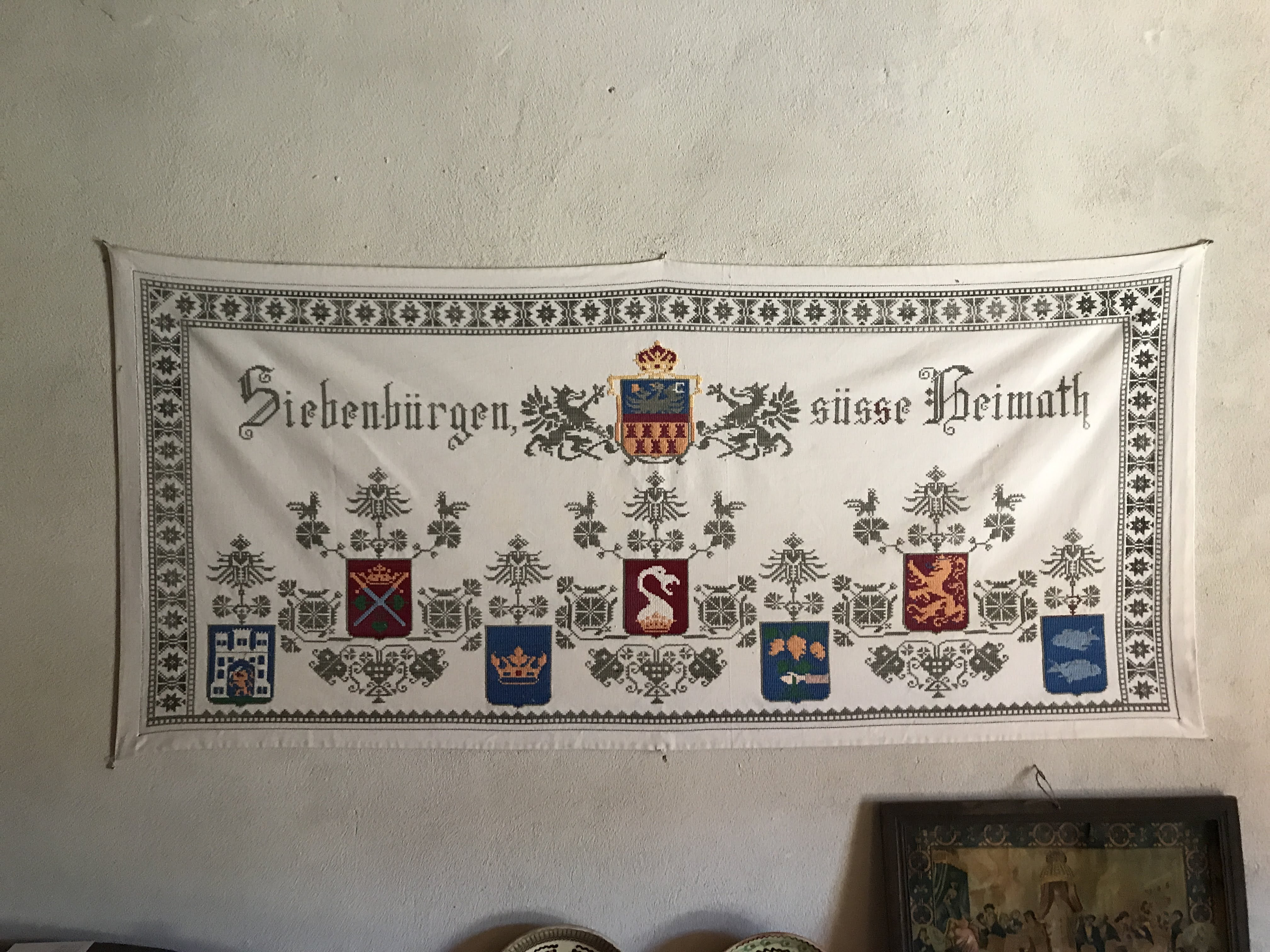
Traditional Transylvanian Saxon carpet

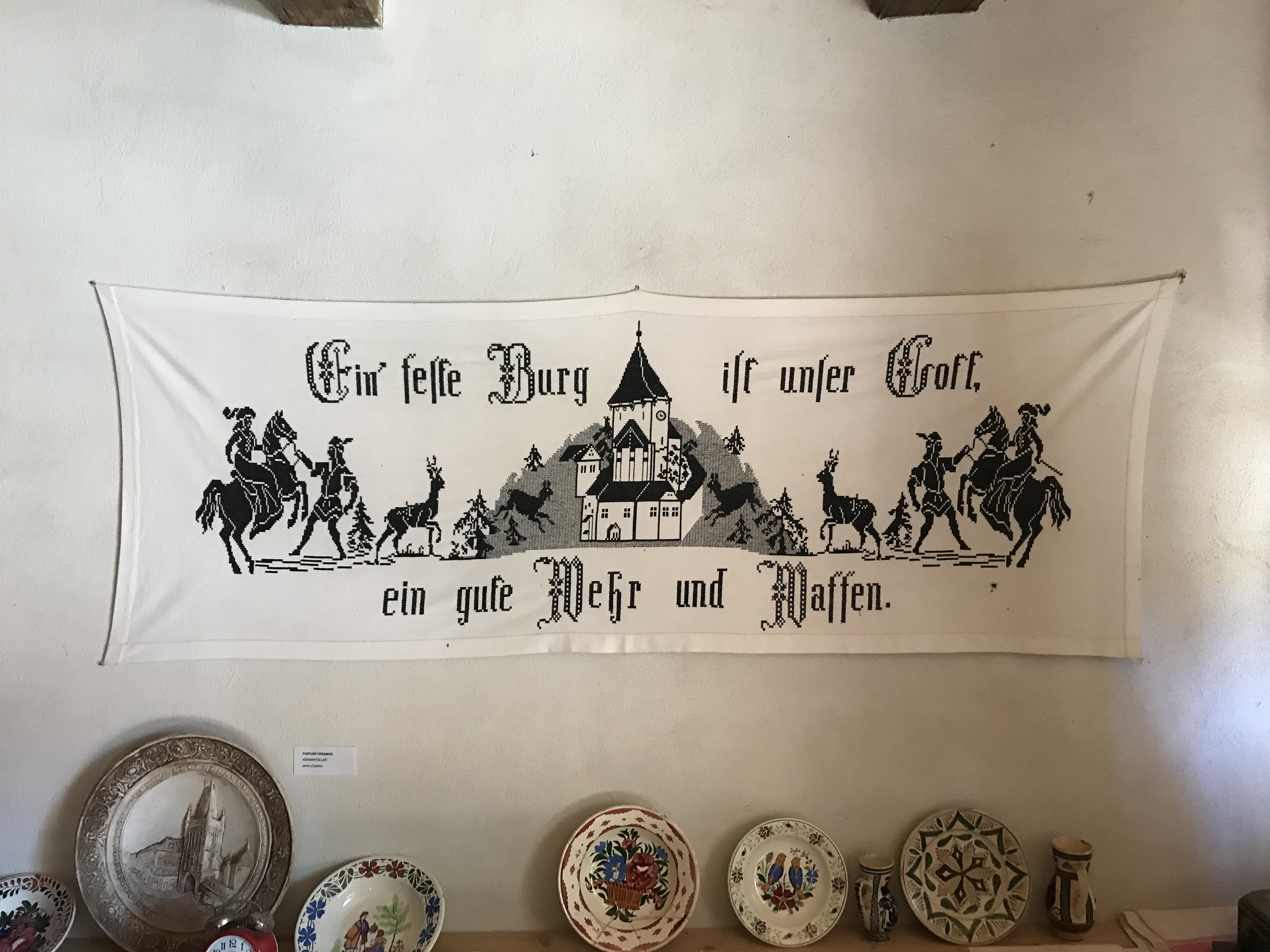
Traditional Transylvanian Saxon carpet

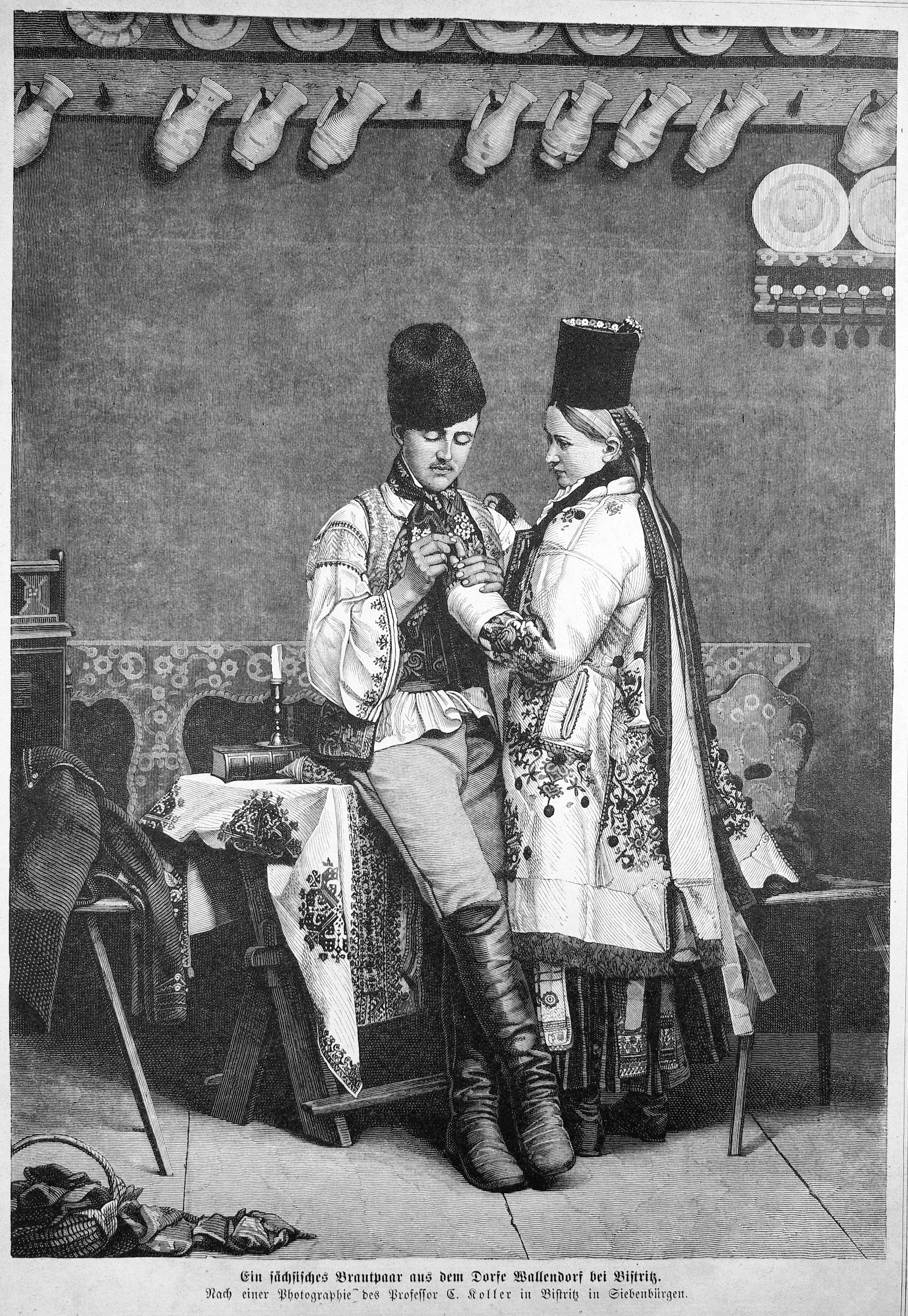
Traditional Transylvanian Saxon costumes from Wallendorf (Unirea village, now part of Bistrița, Bistrița-Năsăud County)

=== Cuisine ===
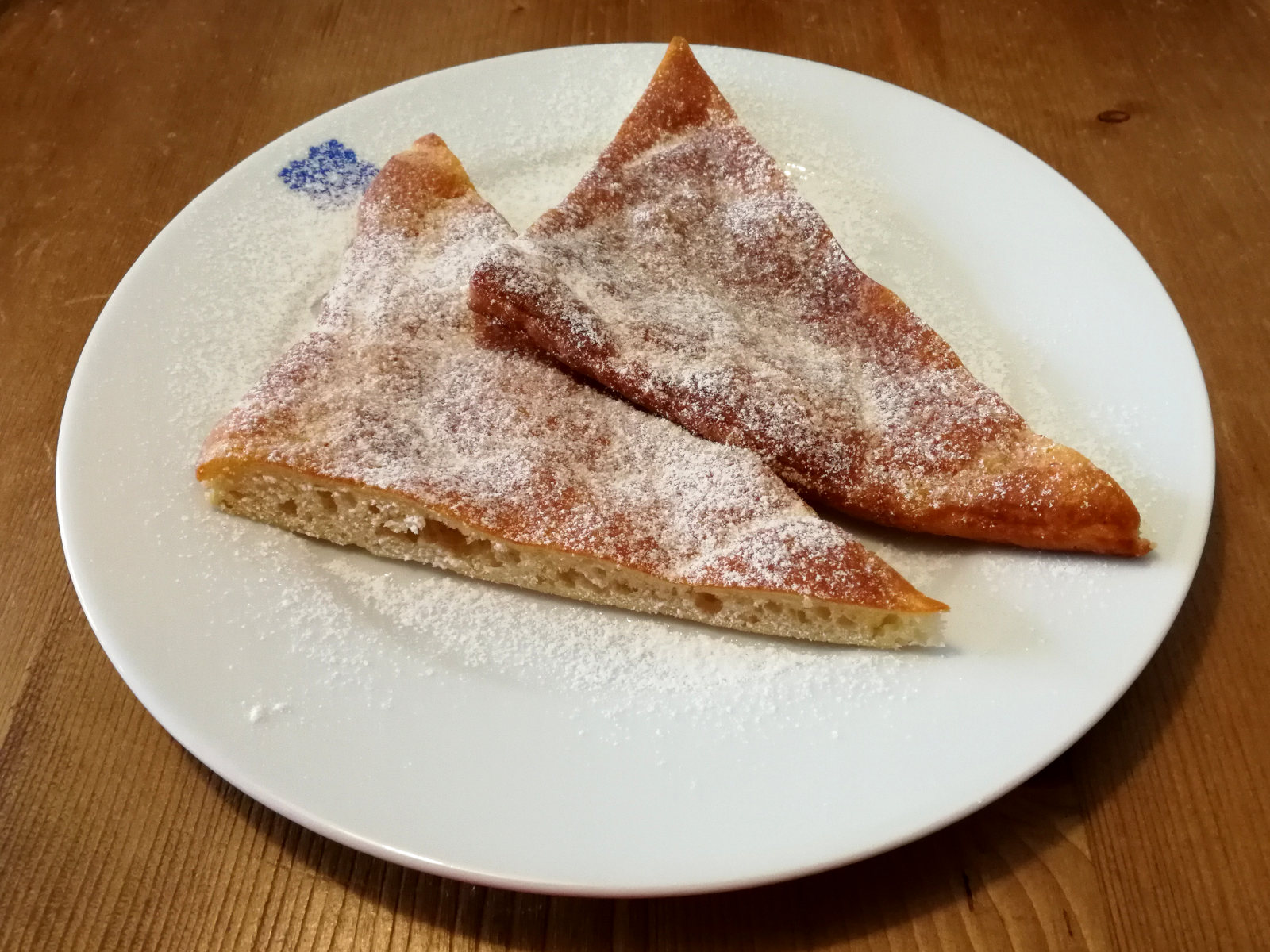
Hanklich from a local restaurant in Sibiu/Hermannstadt

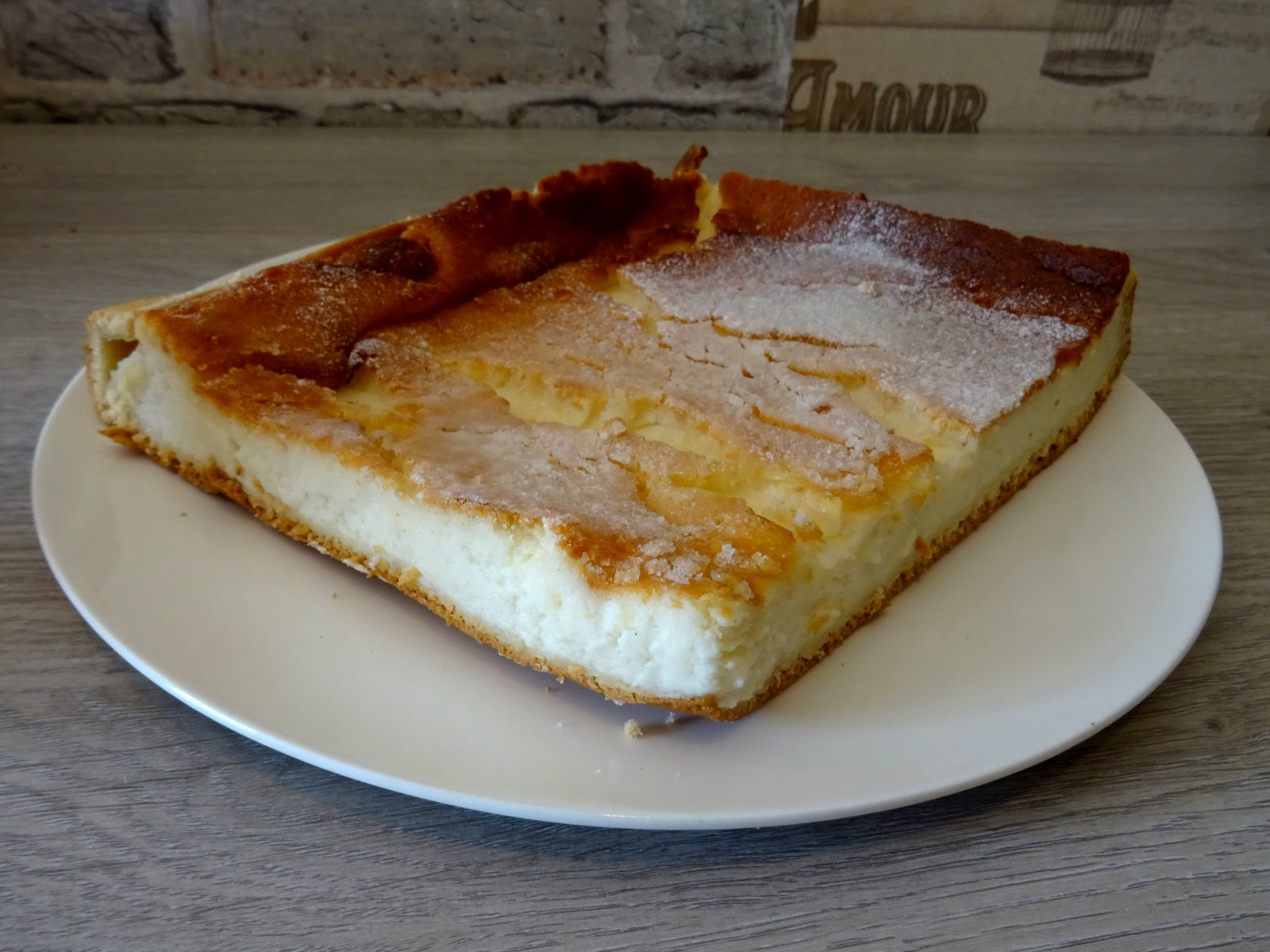
Hanklich from a local bakery in Brașov/Kronstadt

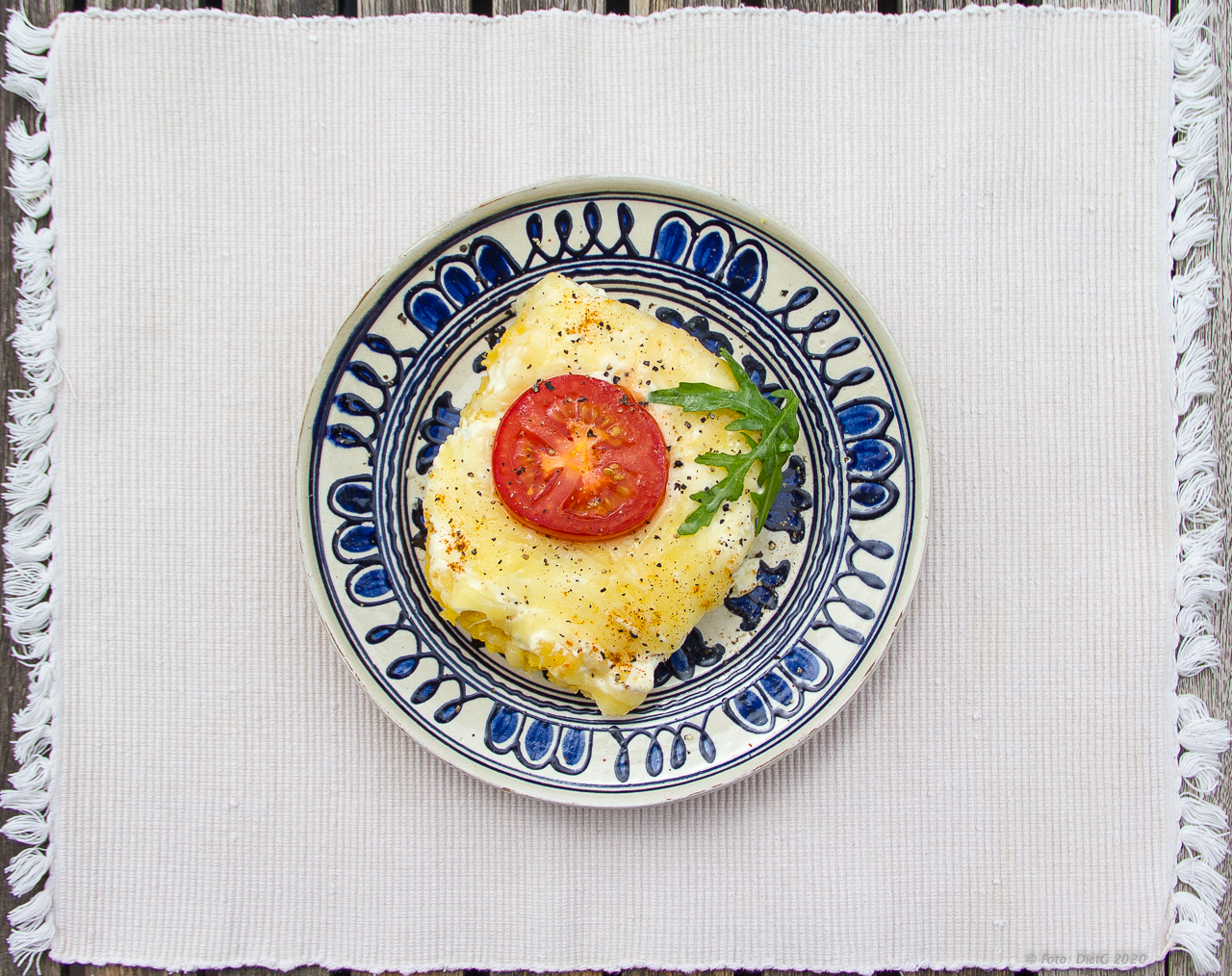
Palukes (similar to the Romanian mămăligă or Italian polenta)

The traditional cuisine of the Transylvanian Saxons is very similar to that of the Romanians and the Hungarians living in Transylvania as well as to those of the Germans, Austrians, or Alemannic Swiss (i.e. from German-speaking Switzerland). In these regards, the Transylvanian Saxon cuisine can be regarded as quintessentially Central European. It also shares some identical dishes with the Austrian cuisine such as cremeschnitte (which has also been traditionally served in Bukovina as well).

One prominent example of a local traditional dessert of the Transylvanian Saxons is the hanklich (Romanian: hencleș or hencleș săsesc), a sweet cheese pie with powdered sugar on top (variations include plums as main ingredients, raisins, or other dry fruits). This particular pastry is still served in restaurants and bakeries in southern Transylvania, particularly in Brașov and Sibiu counties, where, historically, there had been a more significant Transylvanian Saxon ethnic presence compared to the other counties across Transylvania. In Romanian, it is also known as lichiu săsesc or just lichiu.

Another notable example of a traditional Transylvanian Saxon dish is kipferl (Romanian: cornulețe) which can be filled with vanilla, many types of fruit jams, but also with meat. Another traditional Transylvanian Saxon dish is palukes. Kartoffelknodel is yet another noteworthy traditional Transylvanian Saxon delight.

Other traditional Transylvanian Saxon dishes include:

- Apple soup (German: Apfelsuppe);
- Brodelawend (beef soup);
- Strudel;
- Apple pie;
- Lebkuchen (i.e. gingerbread);
- Pancakes (Palatschinke style) with cheese (more specifically curd).

=== Dialect ===
Thomas, a native Transylvanian Saxon speaker from Petersdorf, Nösnerland/Nösnergau/Țara Năsăudului (i.e. Bistrița-Năsăud County), recorded in Freiberg am Neckar, Germany, speaking in Transylvanian Saxon about his upbringing, schooling, and profession (i.e. engineering).

The Transylvanian Saxon dialect (endonym: Siweberjesch-Såksesch or simply just Såksesch; German: Siebenbürgisch-Sächsisch) is a very conservative and rather archaic German dialect that has evolved throughout the passing of time relatively isolated from other German dialects (apart, most notably, from Transylvanian Landler). It has also come in contact with Romanian and Hungarian from which several words were derived. Nevertheless, Transylvanian Saxon is very similar to Luxembourgish and sounds as a form of medieval German (e.g. Old High German or Middle High German).

The similarities with Luxembourgish are both in lexical nature and grammar nature. It also has a series of characters which are different from those of standard German (i.e., Hochdeutsch), for example 'å' (or dumpfes a as it is known in standard German) which is pronounced as in Norwegian or Danish. It is also important to note the fact that even proper names of some Transylvanian Saxon localities sound very similar to Luxembourgish (e.g., "Neithausen" or New house as it can be understood in Luxembourgish if divided into two words). The earliest text in Transylvanian Saxon was written by Johannes Tröster in 1666.

In comparative linguistics, Transylvanian Saxon is a West Central German dialect which is part of the Moselle Franconian branch. Historically, it has been spoken more in rural areas of Transylvania and to a lesser extent in the urban settlements where Transylvanian Saxons lived. Transylvanian Saxon as a regional dialect varied geographically and, consequently, that each village had its own form of it while still retaining mutual intelligibility among themselves as well.

=== Literature ===
The Transylvanian Saxon literature represents a part of the German literature in Central and Eastern Europe as well as a part of Romanian literature. It has been written by Transylvanian Saxon writers since the Middle Ages onwards, in Latin, the Transylvanian Saxon dialect, and Standard German. Writers of partial German/Transylvanian Saxon descent from Transylvania such as Nicolae Breban have also been writing in Romanian. The Transylvanian Saxon literature consists of both prose and poems, ranging from folk tales, folk ballads, and ecclesiastical texts such as prayers. Notable Transylvanian Saxon writers include Josef/Joseph Haltrich and Dutz Schuster (also known as Gustav Schuster-Dutz; full name at birth: Gustav Michael Julius Schuster).

=== Anthem ===
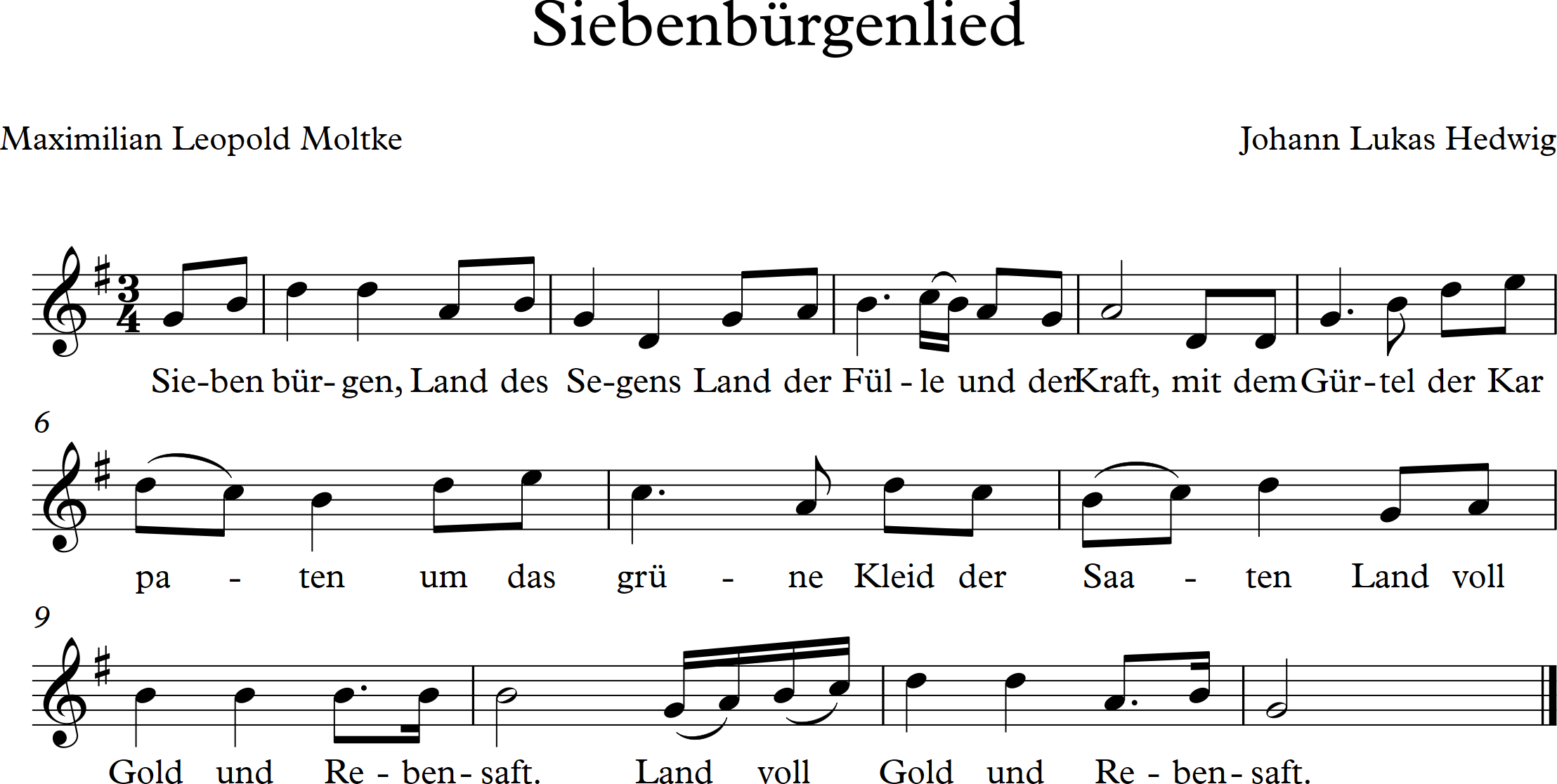
The music sheet of the anthem

Das Siebenbürgenlied (i.e. The song of Transylvania) is the regional anthem of the Transylvanian Saxon community as well as an unofficial regional hymn of Transylvania, praising the region as a land of blessings and great natural beauty. It was written and composed in the mid 19th century. The lyricist was Maximilian Leopold Moltke and the composer was Transylvanian Saxon Johann Lukas Hedwig from Hălchiu (German: Heldsdorf). The anthem is also known as Siebenbürgen, Land des Segens (literally Transylvania, land of blessings).

== Famous Transylvanian Saxons ==
Famous Transylvanian Saxons include intellectuals Johannes Honterus, Christian Schesaeus, Johannes Sommer, Johann Sachs von Harteneck, Samuel von Brukenthal, Georg Maurer, Johann Böhm, or Stephan Ludwig Roth, composers such as Georg Meyndt and Carl Filtsch, visual artists such as Fritz Schullerus, Edith Soterius von Sachsenheim, or Friedrich Miess, scientists such as Hermann Oberth and Conrad Haas, or sportsmen such as Michael Klein, Mora Windt-Martini, or Otto Tellmann. Well known Transylvanian Saxon politicians and administrative leaders include Michael Weiß (former mayor of Brașov/Kronstadt), Klaus Johannis (former President of Romania and former mayor of Sibiu/Hermannstadt), Iancu Sasul (i.e. John the Saxon), Johannes Benkner (a former mayor of Brașov/Kronstadt), or Astrid Fodor (current mayor of Sibu/Hermannstadt).

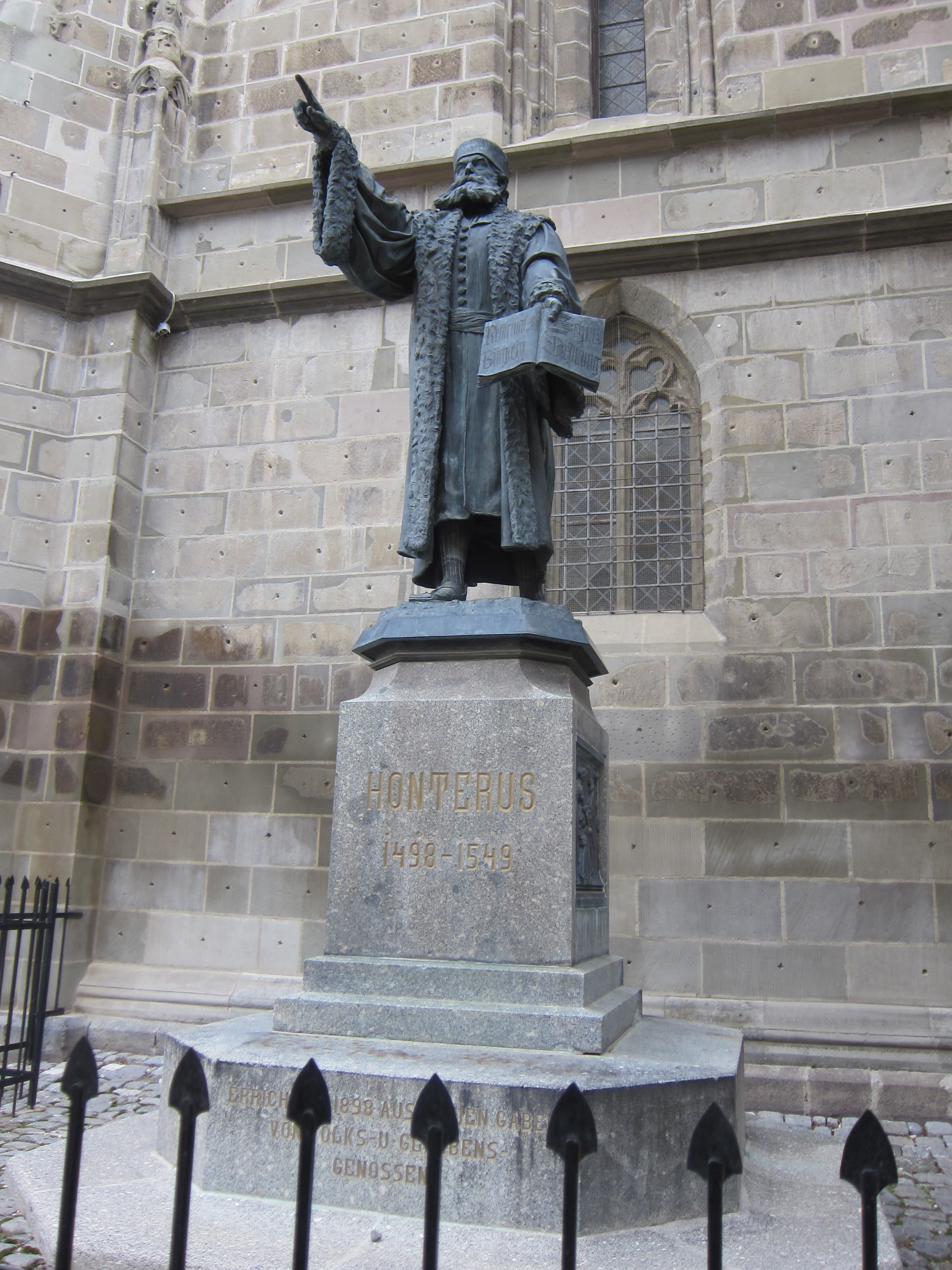
Statue of Johannes Honterus in Brașov (German: Kronstadt) by German sculptor Harro Magnussen

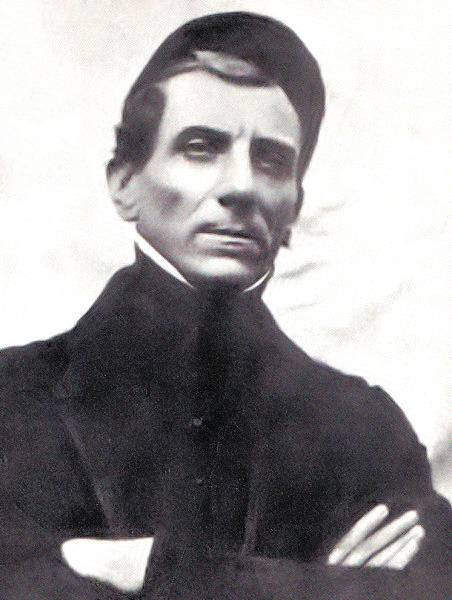
Stephan Ludwig Roth, intellectual and national hero for both the Transylvanian Saxons and the Romanians

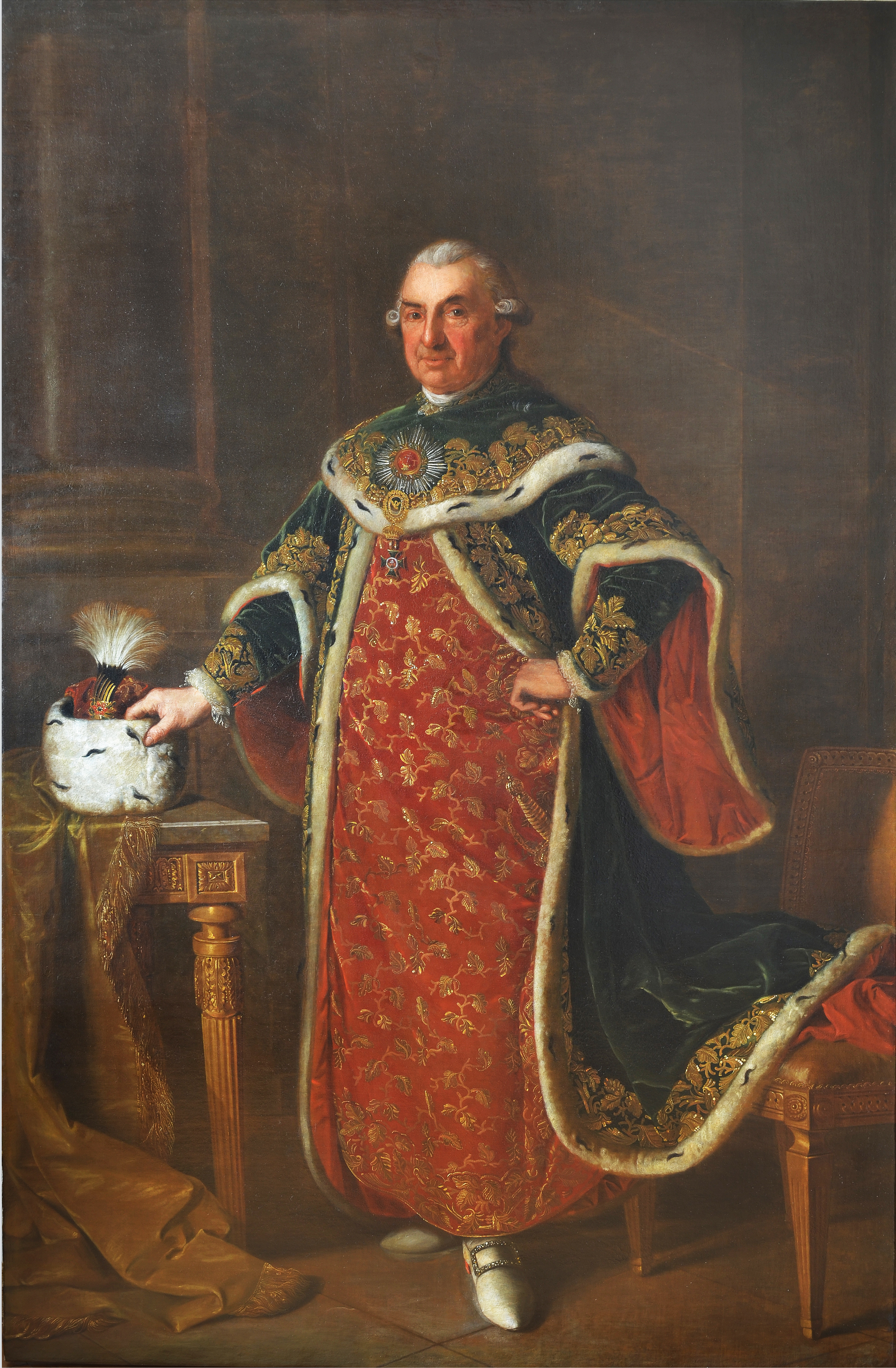
Samuel von Brukenthal, Transylvanian Saxon intellectual and baron

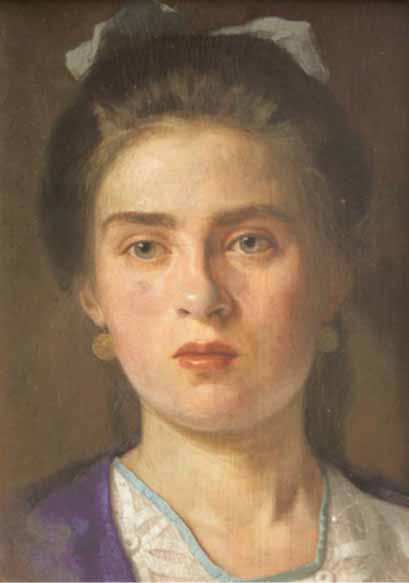
Edith Soterius von Sachsenheim, visual artist

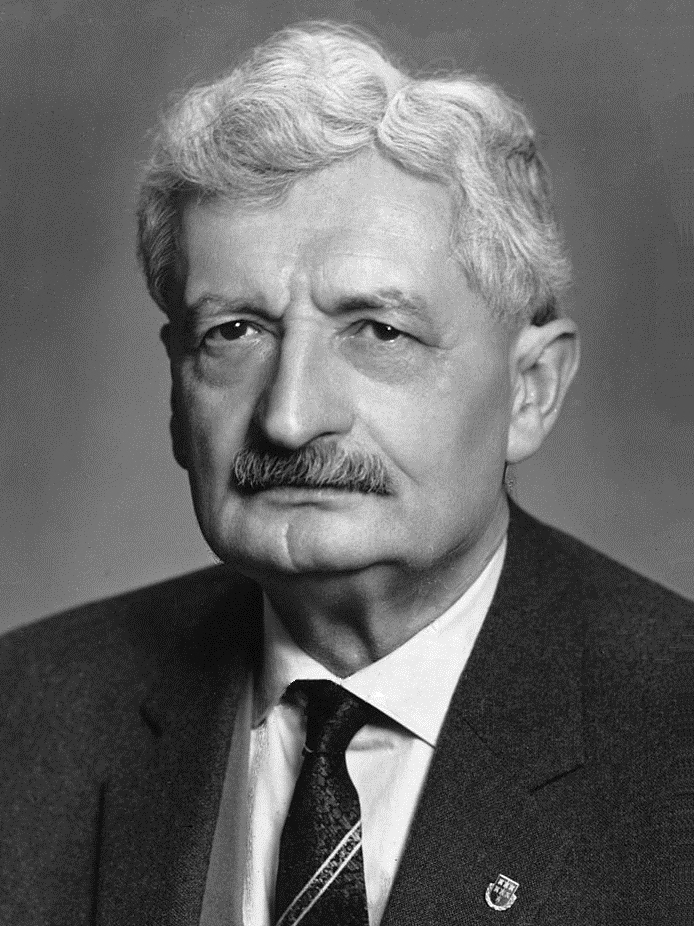
Hermann Oberth, physicist and engineer

== See also ==
- Association of Transylvanian Saxons in Germany
- Germans
- Germans of Romania
- Villages with fortified churches in Transylvania
- List of fortified churches in Transylvania
- List of Transylvanian Saxon localities
- German exonyms in Transylvania
- Transylvanian rugs
- Saxons in medieval Serbia
- Transylvanian Saxon dialect
- Siebenbürgenlied
- Transylvanian Museum in Gundelsheim, Baden-Württemberg, Germany
- Seat (administrative division)
- The Pied Piper of Hamelin is said to have been inspired by a migration of Germans to Transylvania.
- Flight and expulsion of Germans (1944–1950)
