= Soterius von Sachsenheim =

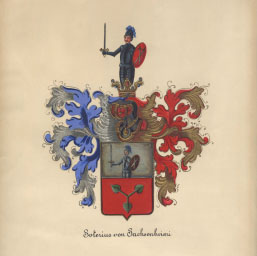
- Country: Austrian Empire; Austria-Hungary
- Founded: 1791

The Soterius von Sachsenheim is a Transylvanian Saxon noble family originating from the village Stein (present-day Dacia), in the former Saxon Repser Stuhl administrative division. Among its members were politicians and bureaucrats in the Transylvanian state administration and also army officers, scholars, pastors and artists.

== Earliest ancestors ==
The ancestors of the family emigrated in the High Middle Ages from the western area of present-day Germany to south-east Transylvania, part of a group of German colonists (Transylvanian Saxons) invited by the Hungarian kings to settle near the eastern border of their kingdom. The initial name of the family was Schöchter(t). In the Moselle Franconian dialect (the base of the German dialect spoken by the Transylvanian Saxons), Schöchtert means a wooden milking pail and a Schöchter is a cooper who manufactures milking pails.

The earliest known ancestor, Valentinus Schöchtert (born c. 1554), lived in the village of Stein (also known by the Hungarian name of Garat, today the village Dacia in Jibert commune near Brașov, Romania) and was a country farmer (land bauer). His son Peter Schöchtert (born c. 1584) also lived in Stein. In the family tree, the words written near his name appear to be Christinus Scholarius (Christian scholar). He married Martha Goldwein.

As in those times it was very fashionable to use Latin surnames, the family name was Latinized from Schöchter(t) to Soterius (which is also similar to the Greek word soter, saviour). Peter Schöchtert's son was Petrus Soterius, born in Stein, in 1618. He became a Lutheran pastor in Bodendorf (today Buneşti), the first of three generations of pastors in the family. Petrus married twice, first to Anna Thomae (1632–66) and second to Barbara Kissling (1633–91), from an old Saxon family of royal judges. In 1661, when he participated in a mission to the Ottoman camp involved in the throne disputes, the Ottoman leader Ali Pasha offered him the title of Prince of Transylvania, in an attempt to win over the sympathies of the Saxons (in the multiethnic context of Transylvania). Petrus though declined as he was content being a pastor.

== Georg Soterius (the Elder) ==
Petrus' son, Georg Soterius (the Elder) was born before 1673 in Bodendorf (Buneşti). He attended the gymnasium in Hermannstadt (present-day Sibiu) and thereafter he studied theology and history in Wittenberg (1693 - 1696). In 1696, Georg Soterius was wrongfully linked to a duel, in which one of his friends was involved. This prevented him from returning home for some time, and instead he went to Riga in Latvia where he landed on 12 May 1696. He then enlisted at the University of Dorpat and stayed in Marienburg (the present-day Alūksne in Latvia), in the house of the pastor Johann Ernst Glück. There he met and tutored Marta Helena Skowrońska, an orphan girl aged twelve from Lithuania fostered by the pastor (who would become the Empress Catherine I of Russia).

Georg Soterius later returned to Hermannstadt. In 1701 he married Agnetha Lupinus, a pastor's daughter. They had two children, Georg (the Younger) (born 1704) and Andreas (born 1707). He taught at the Hermannstadt gymnasium until 1708. He also began a research on the history and the geography of Transylvania, using his knowledge of ancient and modern languages. As preparation for this proposed major work, he put into writing many of his preliminary studies in Latin and German, some of these are kept in the Brukenthal National Museum. The book Cibinium (the Latin name of the river Cibin) has been published in 2006, after being translated from Latin into German for the Transylvanian Library from Horneck Castle (Gundelsheim, Germany).

In 1708 he became a Lutheran pastor in Deutsch-Kreuz (present-day Criţ, in Bunești commune). He had applied for this rather quiet position in order to continue and eventually finish his historical works. Here he received a letter from the Empress Catherine I, who remembered him as her teacher, offering him a position at the Czar's court (he declined her offer for similar reasons). Georg Soterius died of a stroke in Stolzenburg (today Slimnic) on 10 February 1728. He was survived by his wife Agnetha who outlived him by 25 years. She died on 11 November 1756.

== Georg Soterius (the Younger) ==
Georg Soterius (the Younger) attended universities in Germany where he received the Magister's degree in Leipzig. As a young professor he then began to give lectures at the university. His father's death in 1728 prevented him from staying in Germany and he returned to Hermannstadt (Sibiu), where he taught and became a headmaster in 1733. In 1739 he married Anna Katherina Breckner von Brukenthal (1713-1763), the sister of Samuel Breckner von Brukenthal, who later became Governor of Transylvania. Their children were Johann Michael Soterius von Sachsenheim (the Elder), Anna Sophie, Katherina and Anna Maria. In April 1741, Georg Soterius was appointed Lutheran pastor in Schellenberg (present-day Șelimbăr) and in 1746 he went to Stolzenburg (present-day Slimnic). He later became dean of the "Hermannstädter Kapitel". He was considered a man of excellence and scholarship and he wrote several essays and a religious book. He died in 1756 in Stolzenburg.

== Johann Michael Soterius von Sachsenheim (the Elder) ==
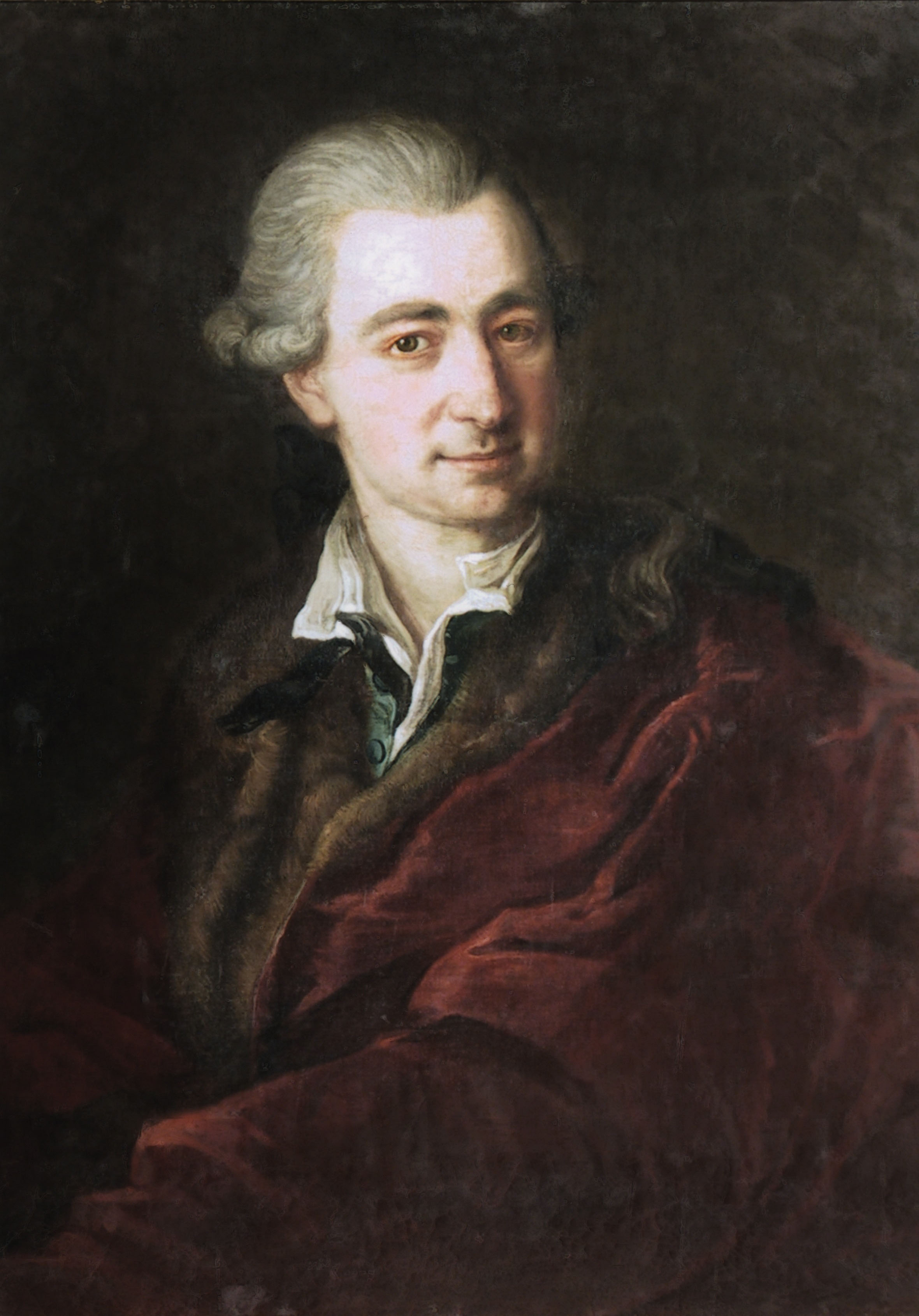
Johann Michael Soterius von Sachsenheim (the Elder) portrait by unknown artist, Brukenthal National Museum

Johann Michael (the Elder) was born in Schellenberg on 25 November 1742 and started his studies at the Hermannstadt (Sibiu) gymnasium. In 1770, he married Anna Mara Filtsch, the daughter of the Hermannstadt parish pastor. Their first child, Anna Maria, was born in 1771. Later, two boys were born, Johann Michael (the Younger) and Charles.

In 1771, he became Gubernialkonzipist and, in 1786, Gubernialsekretär in the administrative system of Transylvania. Following the Edict of Restitution in 1790, a decision was made in 1791 to send a delegation to the Holy Roman Emperor Leopold II, on behalf of the Transylvanian Saxons as they wanted to put forward their own proposal for regulation. Mayor Rosenfeld of Hermannstadt and Johann Michael headed the delegation and in January 1792 they travelled to Vienna to meet Emperor Leopold II. At the same time, Johann Michael was given nobility status by the Emperor, who conferred the title of nobility of von Sachsenheim ("Saxon House" in German) upon him and his descendants, the original signed documents and crest are with family members.

Johann Michael was known as a musical talent, who played piano and composed arias and menuets. After Samuel von Brukenthal's retirement from politics, Johann collaborated with him in organizing and expanding his collections and library (the nucleus of the future Brukenthal National Museum, which includes also a Soterius von Sachsenheim collection). He died on 31 March 1794 in Klausenburg (today Cluj-Napoca), where the family had moved after it had become clear that the seat of the provincial government was to be permanently located there.

== Johann Michael Soterius von Sachsenheim (the Younger) ==
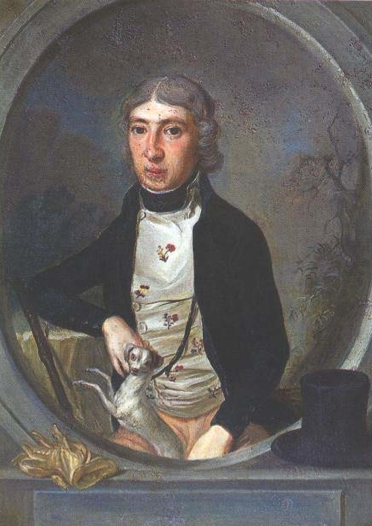
Johann Michael Soterius von Sachsenheim (the Younger) portrait by J.M. Stock (1799), Brukenthal National Museum

Johann Michael Soterius von Sachsenheim (the Younger) was born on 2 February 1775. He attended the local Protestant school and later he studied philosophy and law at Klausenburg (present-day Cluj-Napoca) lyceum until 1794, the year when his father died. After a few months, he joined the district government administration and, in 1796, he was promoted to the central government administration of Transylvania, eventually becoming treasury inspector general in Transylvanian government.

Within the family, he was the first to keep a written record of events in his life, a very detailed diary over many pages kept by members of the family, an insight into life in the early 1800s showing how much illness and death had to be dealt with.

In 1808, he married Theresia Sophie Elisabeth von Albrichtsfeld, who gave birth to four children (two survived infancy). She died of tuberculosis in 1819. In 1820, he married Johanna Justine Conrad, with whom he had eight children (seven survived infancy, notable among them being Clara Adelheid and Albert Conrad). Johann Michael died at the age of 63 of acute respiratory distress syndrome in Hermannstadt, in 1838.

== Clara Adelheid Soterius von Sachsenheim ==
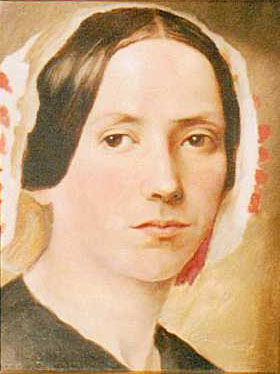
Clara Adelheid Soterius von Sachsenheim self-portrait (1853), Transylvanian Museum

Clara Adelheid was born on 5 November 1822, the second child of Johann Michael the Younger and his second wife Johanna Justine. She displayed artistic talent and the painter Theodor Glatz praised her in a letter to Anton Kurz from 16 May 1847, published in the magazine Siebenbürgischer Volksfreund ("Trasylvanian People's Friend"). Clara frequented the Brukenthal Art Gallery in Hermannstadt (Sibiu) where she could study painting. Here she met the aspiring artist Theodor Sockl who was teaching students there. After much reluctance by her widowed mother, Theodor was allowed to paint a portrait of Clara in 1847.

Clara and Theodor then started to live together out of wedlock, much to the displeasure of her mother and the rest of the family. Despite resistance from the family, who had doubts about giving consent to marriage due to Theodor's insecure position and also because of his religious and status differences, the couple were married on 12 August 1847. They then left Hermannstadt (Sibiu) and lived in Graz and Vienna in Austria until 1850, when they returned to Hermannstadt.

Clara, now a mother, earned a living by giving lessons in painting and drawing, she also painted portraits of Dr. Gottfried Teilmann and of (Tafelrichter) Adolf Spech. A series of 20 portraits of Transylvanian nobles were also painted. Her husband still painted but had also become a photographer. In spring 1854 they set up a photographic studio in Hermannstadt, Clara would colour in some of the photographs as was the fashion of this developing form. In October 1857 the family moved back to Vienna, Austria where they continued with their painting and photography.

Clara, who was suffering from a lung complaint, died on 25 July 1861, aged 38. A few months later, on 25 December, Theodor, aged 46, followed her to the grave. To cover the funeral costs, Theodor's brother sold the paintings that were left, including hundreds of studies, to a Viennese junk dealer. A self-portrait and a portrait of her husband Theodor both painted in 1853 were brought to England by her sons, the family have since given them to the Transylvanian Museum in Gundelsheim.

They had four children, of whom three survived infancy. Among them, Victor Franz Theodor Sockl would set up and run a successful greeting card company in England (Sockl and Nathan).

Clara is listed in the Benezit Dictionary of Artists and is written about in a 1970 publication about artists in Sibiu around 1850 by Dr. Julius Bieltz.

== Albert Conrad Soterius von Sachsenheim ==
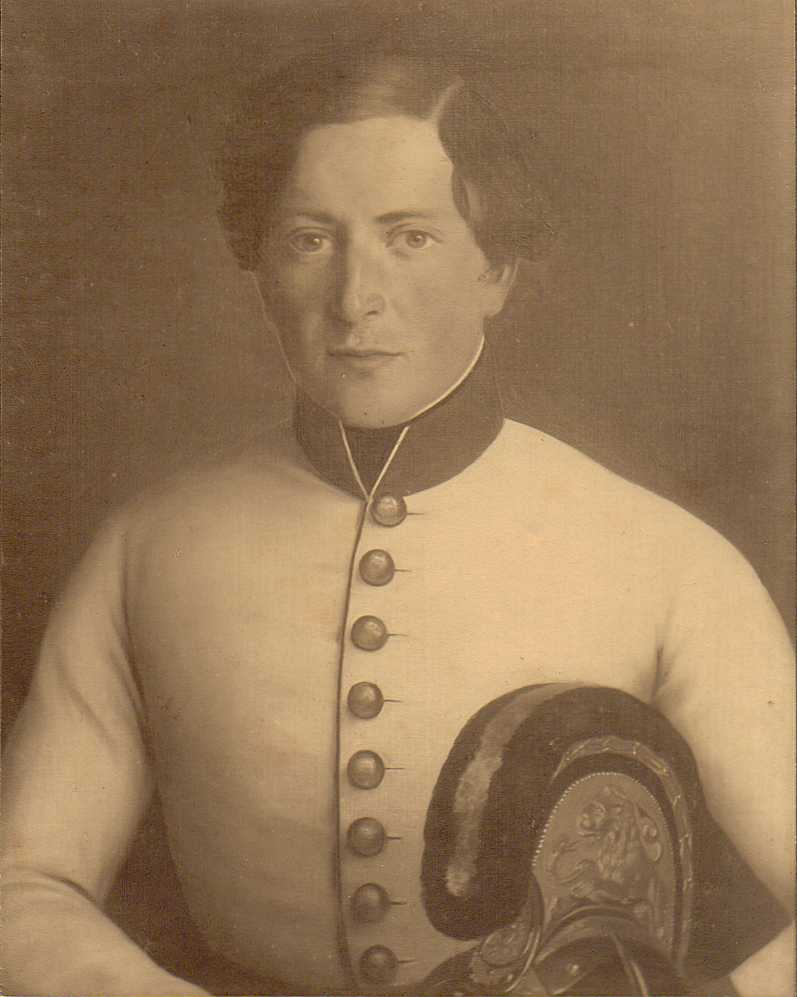
Albert Conrad Soterius von Sachsenheim portrait by Theodor Sockl (about 1848)

Albert Conrad Soterius von Sachsenheim was born on 7 May 1824. After graduating from the Hermannstadt (Sibiu) gymnasium, he pursued a military career promoted up to Lieutenant in 1847. During the Hungarian Revolution of 1848, he was involved in 19 battles and skirmishes. He retired from the army in 1860 achieving the rank of Squadron Commandant. Afterwards, Albert took up residence in Mediasch, the birthplace of his wife Jeanette Schaffendt, and started to engage in public life.

In 1861, he was involved in the founding of the "Association for Savings and Advancements in Transylvania" (an association that often preceded the foundation of a bank). In 1867 he participated in the founding of the "Wine Export Association", in which he acted as a committee member until 1873. As a member of the upper management of the "Transylvanian - Saxon Agricultural Society", he presided over the Regional Association in Mediasch for two years. Since the re-organisation of the Greater Local Council he has been a city representative and a member of the Committee of the Mediasch District Assembly. In 1872, he was appointed a corresponding member of the Chamber of Commerce in Kronstadt.

In 1872, he won a parliamentary mandate in the Diet of Hungary for the legislative period 1872 – 1875, and in 1875 he was elected for another three-year term.

== Arthur Soterius von Sachsenheim ==
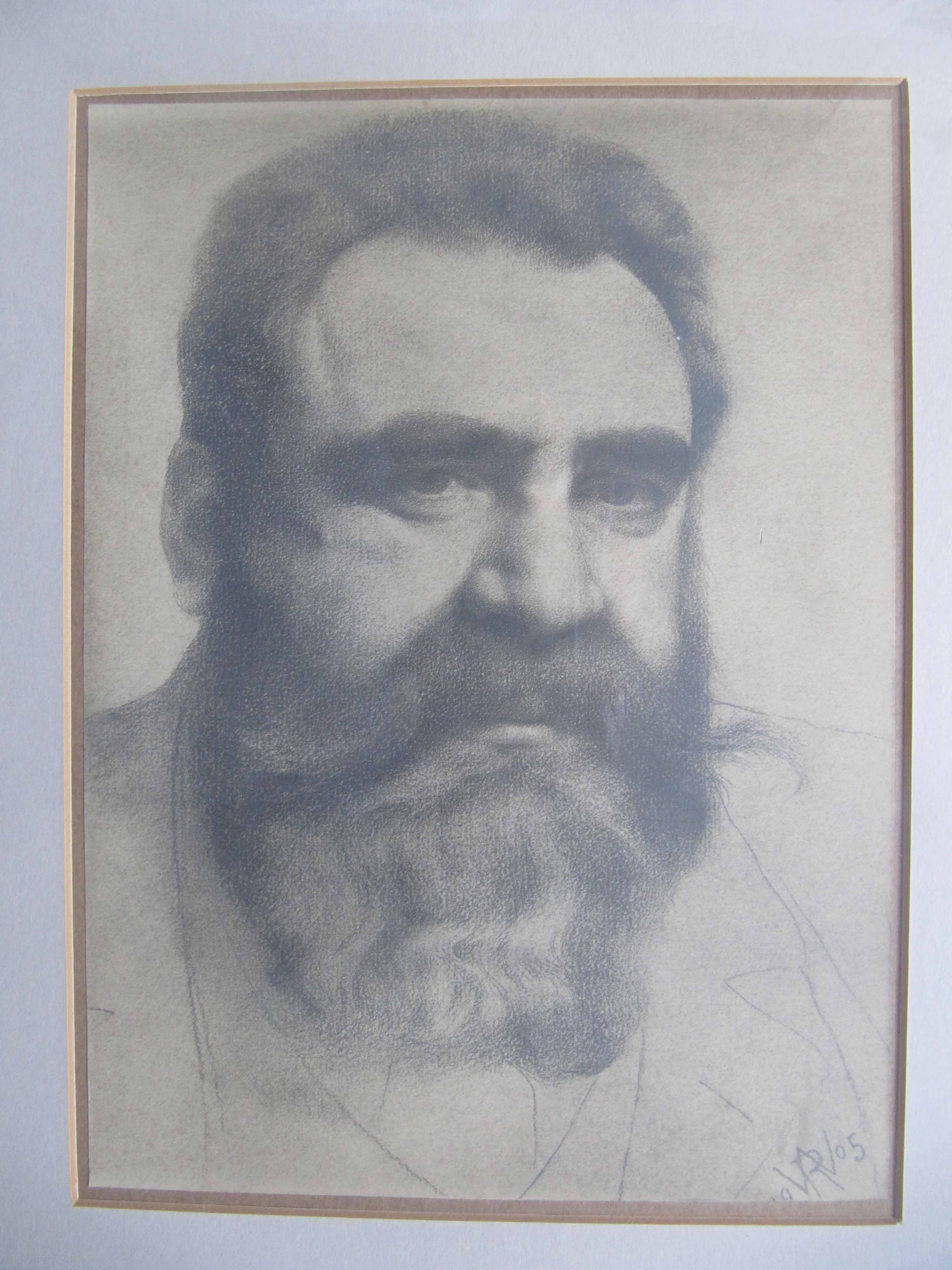
Arthur Soterius von Sachsenheim portrait by Robert Wellman (1905)

Dr. med. Arthur Soterius von Sachsenheim was born on 31 July 1852, in Békéscsaba, where at that time his father Albert Conrad was serving in the army. After graduating the Gymnasium in Mediasch, he studied medicine at the University of Vienna with student residencies in Graz, Berlin and Würzburg, receiving the doctor diploma for general medical practice. He enrolled in 1881 in Vienna to attend a course for the military medical school and was drafted in 1882 to the garrison hospital in Triest. Here he took a great interest in the lively activities of the shipping lines and in February 1883 he quit his military service and was taken on by the Austro-Hungarian Lloyd Steamship company as ship's doctor. In this capacity he visited the Mediterranean area and went twice to Brazil. He also traveled to the coastal countries of the Red Sea, followed by India, Sri Lanka, Indonesia and China.

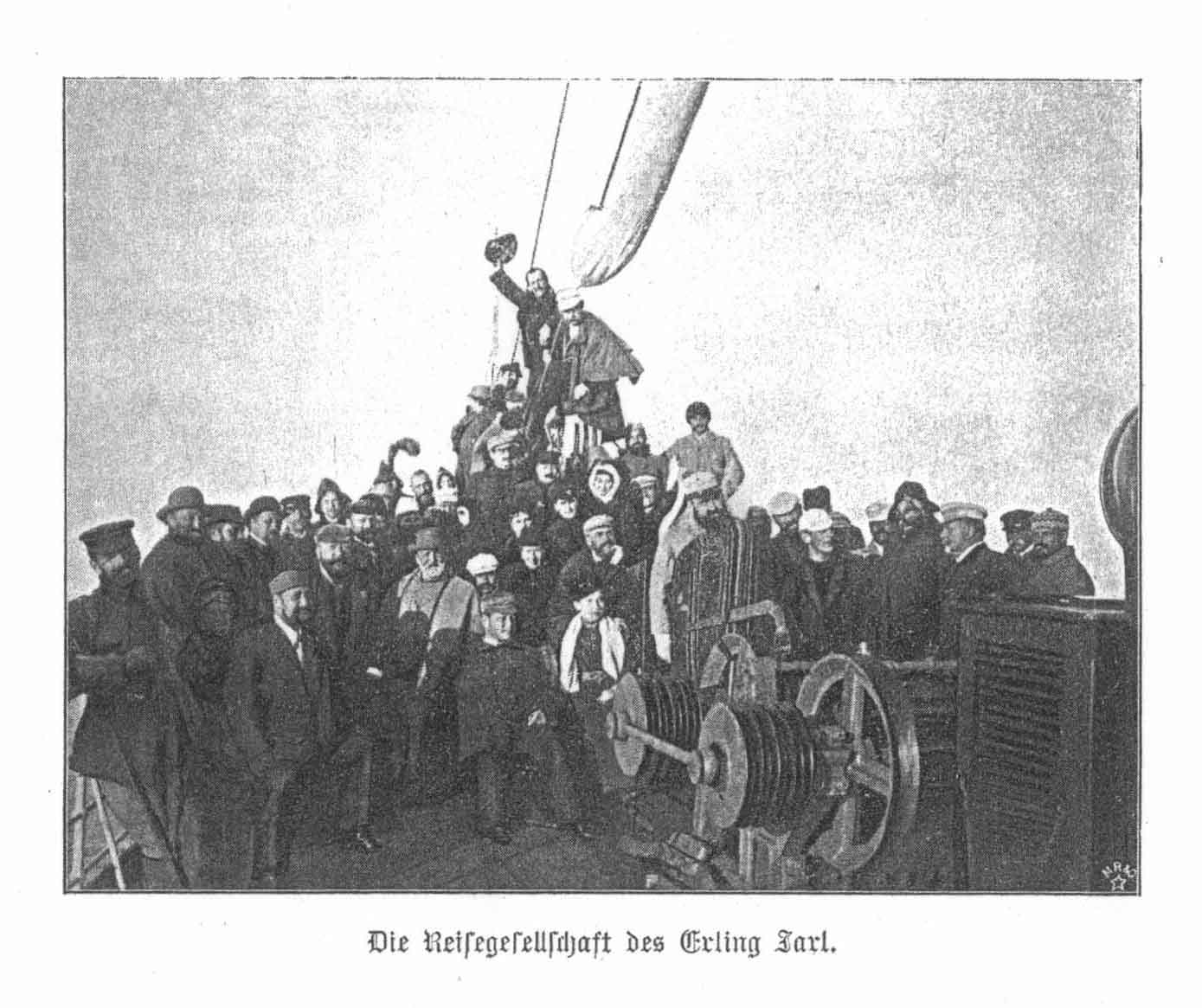
The team of the 1896 Erling Jarl expedition. Arthur S.v.S. is in the front to the right with the white cap and beard.

After about two years of almost uninterrupted travel, in March 1885 he returned to Transylvania and became a physician in Marienburg (today Feldioara). Here he married Wilhelmina Gust, who gave birth to three daughters (among them, Edith Soterius von Sachsenheim). From February 1889, he is in secondary position at the Franz Josef Hospital in Herrmannstadt (in 1904 he would become the chief physician there).

Arthur participated in the 1896 expedition of the steamer Erling Jarl, when thirty scientists from thirty countries were sent to explore the region around Svalbard (Spitzbergen). There they met Salomon August Andrée, who was preparing his 1897 Arctic Balloon Expedition, they were also seeking news of Fridtjof Nansen, who had attempted to go as far north as possible (and succeeded), but his whereabouts were not known until sometime later in 1896. Arthur collected ethnographic objects, mammal skeletons and molluscs (including a mollusk later named Neptunea sachsenheimi). After returning from the expedition, he wrote the publication From Transylvania to Spitzbergen (available in ASTRA National Museum Complex).

He donated to the Transylvanian Association for Natural Sciences a collection of over 100 ethnographic objects gathered from various parts of the world. This collection was one of the initial core collections of "Franz Binder" Museum of Universal Ethnography opened in 1933 in Sibiu, part of ASTRA National Museum Complex.

== Edith Jeanette Soterius von Sachsenheim ==
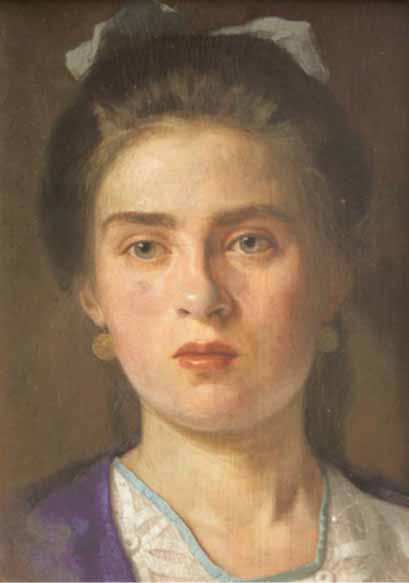
Edith Jeanette Soterius von Sachsenheim portrait by Arthur Coulin

Edith Jeanette Soterius von Sachsenheim was born on 26 December 1887, in Marienburg (Feldioara). From an early age, she displayed artistic talent in painting and her parents supported her wish to follow a career in this field. After completing a two-year course (1903–04) at Hermannstadt (Sibiu) Art College, her father brought her to stay with relatives in England, where she spent one year (1904–05) taking up English and art classes. She was granted permission by the National Gallery to copy museum works, and here she developed an interest in Turner's watercolours, a visible influence in her early works.

In 1907, her father decided that she should continue her studies, and she enrolled at the Royal College of Art and Crafts in Munich. Here she visited the artistic circle of Professor Moritz Heymann, where she met artists that had a close affinity to the Jugend group, with paintings influenced by the Art Nouveau style. Apart from returning home for holidays she spent three years studying at the Royal College of Arts and Crafts in Munich, In 1911, Edith returned to Transylvania where she had her first exhibition at the Brașov Galleries. In 1912, she married Dr. med. Franz Herfurth, becoming the mother of three children, Editha, Günther and Eva. The family obligations limited her artistic pursuits for some time. In 1926, she divorced and in 1927 she married her childhood friend, Professor Ludwig Herbert (who died in 1936).

After this heartbreak, Edith moved to south Germany, then Poland and then Austria, she painted where she could, producing mainly watercolours of the places she lived in and visited. These works are influenced to some extent by her formerly mentioned early encounter with Turner's art. In 1955, she moved to London, England, to live with her daughter Eva. Here she drew portraits and painted mainly roses right up to her death at the age of 83 in 1970.

In her lifetime, Edith created over 200 paintings, drawings and lithographs, now in several museums or in possession of friends and relatives across Europe. In 1998, the Transylvanian Museum from Gundelsheim, Germany staged a retrospective exhibition and bought fifty of her paintings, some of which are on permanent display in the museum. In 1999, The Gundelsheim collection was exhibited in Munich at the Haus des Deutschen Ostens. In 2001, the Military History Museum of Vienna bought three portraits of World War One officers, to be displayed there.
