= Theodor Sockl =

Austrian painter (1815–1861)

Theodor Benedikt Sockl
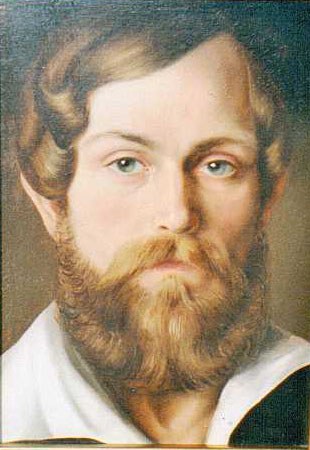
- Theodor Sockl portrait by his wife Clara (1853); Transylvanian Museum
- Born: 15 April 1815; Vienna, Austrian Empire
- Died: 25 December 1861 (aged 46); Vienna, Austrian Empire
- Education: Academy of Fine Arts Vienna
- Known for: Painting
- Movement: Biedermeier

Theodor Benedikt Sockl (15 April 1815 – 25 December 1861) was an Austrian painter and photographer.

== Early life ==
Stockl was born in Vienna on 15 April 1815, the son of the master cabinet-maker and inventor, Johann Gottlieb Stockl and Sophie, née Shurer von Waldheim (among his siblings, the writer Sophie von Scherer, née Sockl). In 1834–1836, Sockl studied at the Academy of Fine Arts in Vienna, first as a student of sculpture, later developing an interest in painting. In 1841, he painted the portrait of his youngest brother Hermann Karl Sockl as a 16-year-old youth (painting lost) and in 1843 he painted an altar piece for the church of the Piarists Maria Treu in Josefstadt, Vienna.

== Early career ==
From around 1846, he lived in Transylvania, appearing in the artistic circle of Theodor Glatz, who recommends him locally as a talented painter. He taught painting in Hermannstadt (today Sibiu), at the Brukenthal Art Gallery, where in 1847 he met, as a student, his future wife, Clara Adelheid Soterius von Sachsenheim. Her portrait, painted in that year, is considered representative for the Biedermeier period in Transylvania, expressing on a bucolic background, the personality of the model, the chromatics and the discreet elegancy of the dress. The original of the painting was lost in England, fortunately, a copy was commissioned by Theodor's nephew Dr. med Arthur Soterius von Sachsenheim before he brought the original painting to Theodor's sons in England in 1905. This copy is now in the Brașov County Museum of History.

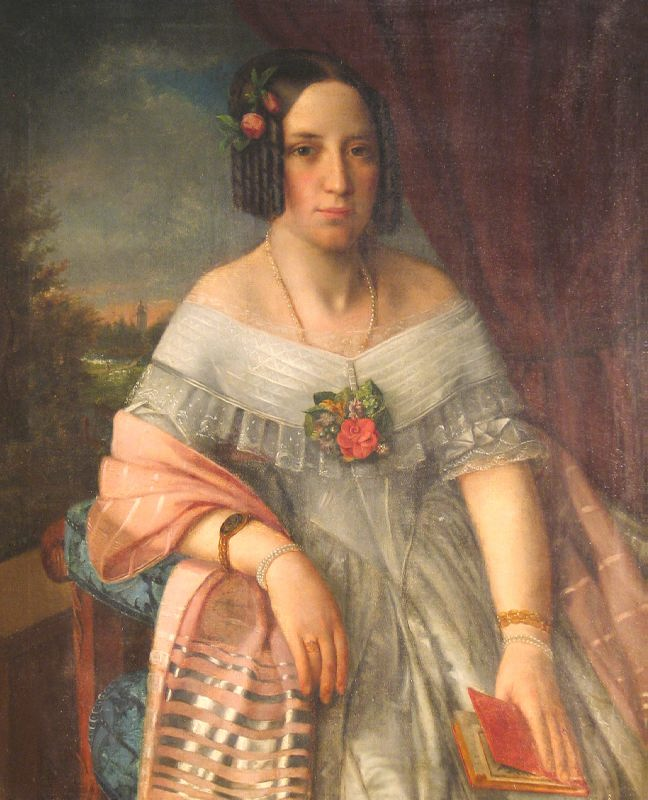
Clara Adelheid Soterius von Sachsenheim portrait by Theodor Sockl (1847)

Theodor and Clara started to live together out of wedlock, much to the displeasure of her widowed mother and the rest of the family (at the time they all considered her the black sheep of the family). But despite resistance from the family, who had doubts about giving consent to marriage due to Theodor's insecure position and also because of his religious and status differences, the couple were married on 12 August 1847 in Mehadia.

They then left Transylvania and lived first in Graz, Austria, where in 1848 their eldest son, Victor Franz Theodor was born, then they moved to Vienna, where their second son, Theodor Friedrich Adolf, was born on in 1849 but died in 1850.

In the context of the 1848 Revolution in the Austrian Empire, an open letter written by his sister Sophie von Scherer to the 1848 Catholic bishop conference at Würzburg, requesting ecclesiastical reforms, such as the abolition of the celibate and worship in the German language, would cause public controversy. Theodor Sockl wrote a subsequent public letter, accusing her of Protestant convictions. In her turn, she invalidated her brother's arguments in a public reply.

== After 1848 ==
In the summer of 1850, together with his wife and his son, he returned to Hermannstadt, where they took up residence in the Soterius house. Here they had a daughter, Ottilie Clara Sophie, born in 1851. In this time Theodor painted another portrait of Clara Adelheid, as well as more members of the Soterius von Sachsenheim family. He also painted:

- two door panels of a man (Asklepois) and a woman (Hygiea) commissioned by a chemist 'Molnaush' in Heltaurgasse, Sibiu, c. 1852 (both in Brukenthal Museum Nos. 1493 & 1494);
- a portrait of Kaiser Franz Joseph as a young man c. 1852 (Brukenthal Museum No.1365);
- the founder of the Hermannstadt general savings bank Michael Fr. Herbert (Brukenthal Museum No. 2122);
- an unknown business man from Hermannstadt (also in the Brukenthal Museum No. 1113).

In the Benignis folk calendar of 1853 we find an advertisement for ‘Theodor Sockl as academic portrait and historical painter in the Fleischergasse no.110.’ But the economic and social environment left by the 1848/49 Revolutions in Europe made it difficult for Theodor to earn a living, so he was forced into an unsettled wandering lifestyle in order to find work. In the meantime Clara gave lessons in painting and drawing. In 1853 in Bucharest, Sockl buys some photographic equipment to try to earn a living form this new form. In 1854, he moves the photographic studio to Hermannstadt, where Clara would colour in some of the photographs as was the fashion of this developing form. But over the next years they have to travel round the whole country to earn a living form photography. In 1857, living in Oravița in the Hungarian Banat, another son, Carl Franz Albert is born.

Sockl was however, unable to prevent a section of his possessions from being pawned. Finally he decided to move with his family from Orşova on the Danube to Vienna, Austria, where they arrived on 28 October 1857. He painted fourteen pictures in oil for the cloister at the Ursuline Convent there, for which he received 210 fl. C.M. Where they first lived is not known, but in October 1859 the family moved into a flat in Fünfhaus, Hauptstraße No. 231, where they also set up a photographic studio.

== Death and legacy ==
Clara, who was suffering from a lung complaint, died on 25 July 1861, aged 38. A few months later, on 25 December, Theodor, aged 46, followed her to the grave. To cover the funeral costs, Theodor’s brother, Moritz, sold the paintings that were left, including hundreds of studies, to a Viennese junk dealer.

There are paintings by the Sockl's in the Brukenthal National Museum and the Transylvanian Museum from Gundelsheim. Some are also privately owned and some are lost.

Their sons Victor and Carl emigrated to England around 1889, Victor would set up and run a very successful greetings card company called Sockl and Nathan, Carl would be the accountant. Their daughter Ottilie became a teacher and lived in Switzerland. Neither Victor nor Otillie married so they had no children. Carl married his cousin Emma, daughter of Theodor's brother Hermann, they had six children, five survived infancy and all lived and died in England. Two had children of their own.
