= Edith Soterius von Sachsenheim =

Transylvanian Saxon painter (1887-1970)

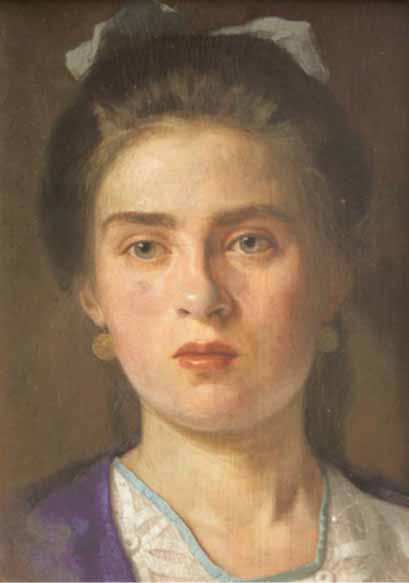
- Edith Soterius von Sachsenheim portrait by Arthur Coulin, Transylvanian Museum
- Born: Edith Jeanette Soterius von Sachsenheim; 26 December 1887; Marienburg (today Feldioara)
- Died: 4 January 1970 (aged 83); London, England
- Education: Hermannstadt Art College; Royal College of Art and Crafts (Munich)
- Known for: Painting

Edith Jeanette Soterius von Sachsenheim (1887–1970) was a Transylvanian Saxon painter, who spent part of her career in England and elsewhere in Europe.

== Biography ==
=== Early life ===
von Sachsenheim was born on 26 December 1887, in Marienburg (present-day Feldioara), the daughter of Dr. med. Arthur Soterius von Sachsenheim (from the Transylvanian Saxon noble family Soterius von Sachsenheim) and of Wilhelmina, née Gust. From an early age, she displayed a talent for painting and her parents supported her wish to follow a career in this field. After completing a two-year course (1903–04) at Hermannstadt (Sibiu) Art College, her father brought her to stay with relatives in England, where she spent one year (1904–05) learning English, followed by piano and art classes. She was granted permission by the National Gallery to copy museum works, and developed an interest in Turner's watercolours, a visible influence in her early works, as well as in a later period, from 1948. In July 1905, Edith was awarded a "distinction" grade on a piano exam at the London College of Music.

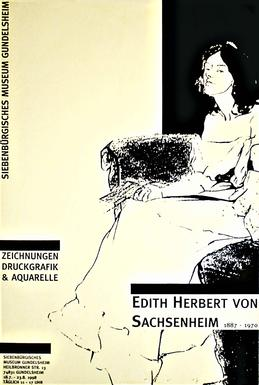
Poster of the 1998 Transylvanian Museum exhibition featuring a drawing of Eleanor Garrett-Ward (1908)

=== Munich ===
In 1907, her father decided that von Sachsenheim should continue her studies, and she enrolled in the Royal College of Art and Crafts in Munich, where she developed an interest in portrait and anatomy art. A year later, she began visiting the artistic circle of Professor Moritz Heymann, where she met artists that had a close affinity to the Jugend group. Edith's works from this period, e.g. Sitzender Halbakt ("Seated Semi-Nude") or the portrait of her friend Eleanor Garrett-Ward, reflect her ambition to overcome the dated artistic conceptions of the academy. These, and other works of this period, appear elegant, with flowing lines and the decorative colourings typical of Art Nouveau. Apart from returning home for holidays she spent three years studying at the Royal College of Art and Crafts in Munich. In 1911, Edith returned to Transylvania, where she had her first exhibition at the Brașov Galleries.

=== World War I ===
In 1912, she married Dr. med. Franz Herfurth and moved with him to Austria, where she spent the First World War years, moving back to Kronstadt (Brasov) in 1918. She was the mother of three children, Editha, Günther and Eva, but the family obligations limited her artistic pursuits for some time. The marriage did not last; the couple divorced in 1926 and the following year she married her childhood friend, Professor Ludwig Herbert. However, he was also not conducive to her artistic work and Edith continued being a mother and started doing some work as an English teacher. Ludwig died of a heart attack aged 51 in 1936.

=== Later life ===
After this heartbreak, Edith moved to south Germany to be near her daughters who were living there, she also spent some time in Poland then returned to south Germany for the remainder of World War Two. She painted where she could, producing mainly watercolours of the places she lived in and visited. This brought on a new phase in her artwork, she gave up any form of modernism and confined herself to a strictly objective, realistic representation of her subject. Up to 1946 she taught art in various schools and painted in her spare time. In January 1946, her son Günther died and in August the same year she moved with her eldest daughter to Graz, Austria. Another creative phase followed in 1948, when she produced a series of watercolours in the areas of Graz and on a visit to Zurich, these works are influenced to some extent by her formerly mentioned early encounter with Turner's art. In 1952, a landscape watercolour won the silver prize at Foyles Bookshop International Artists Competition.

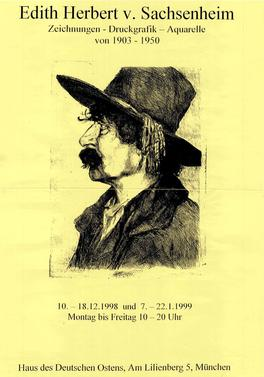
Poster of the 1999 Haus des Deutschen Ostens exhibition featuring the drawing Italian Man With A Hat (1912)

In 1955, she moved to London, England, to live with her daughter Eva. Here she drew portraits (including those of her daughter's family) and painted mainly roses. In 1957, Edith submitted and had exhibited the drawing A little girl from Krakow at the Royal Society of Portrait Painters. The exhibition travelled all around the country.

Edith died in 1970, at the age of 83. In her lifetime, she created over 200 paintings, drawings and lithographs, now in several museums or in possession of friends and relatives across Europe. In 1998, the Transylvanian Museum from Gundelsheim, Germany staged a retrospective exhibition and bought 50 of her paintings, some of which are on permanent display in the museum. In 1999, The Gundelsheim collection was also exhibited in Munich at the Haus des Deutschen Ostens. In 2001, the Military History Museum of Vienna bought three portraits of World War One officers, to be displayed there.

== Art contemporaries and friends ==
- Arthur Coulin: A friend from Sibiu, he did an oil painting of Edith in 1907 in Sibiu when she was 19 years old. The portrait is in the Transylvanian Museum.
- Ernst Honigberger: A friend from Sibiu also studying in Munich, he did a pencil drawing of Edith, aged 20, in 1908. This is now in the Gundelsheim Museum.
- Robert Wellman: A friend from Sibiu, became a family friend and did a portrait of Edith's father Arthur Soterius von Sachsenheim. This is in the family home in London, England.
- Trude Schullerus: A friend from Sibiu also studied in Munich, remained a friend of the family for life.
