= Laura Seddon Greeting Card Collection =

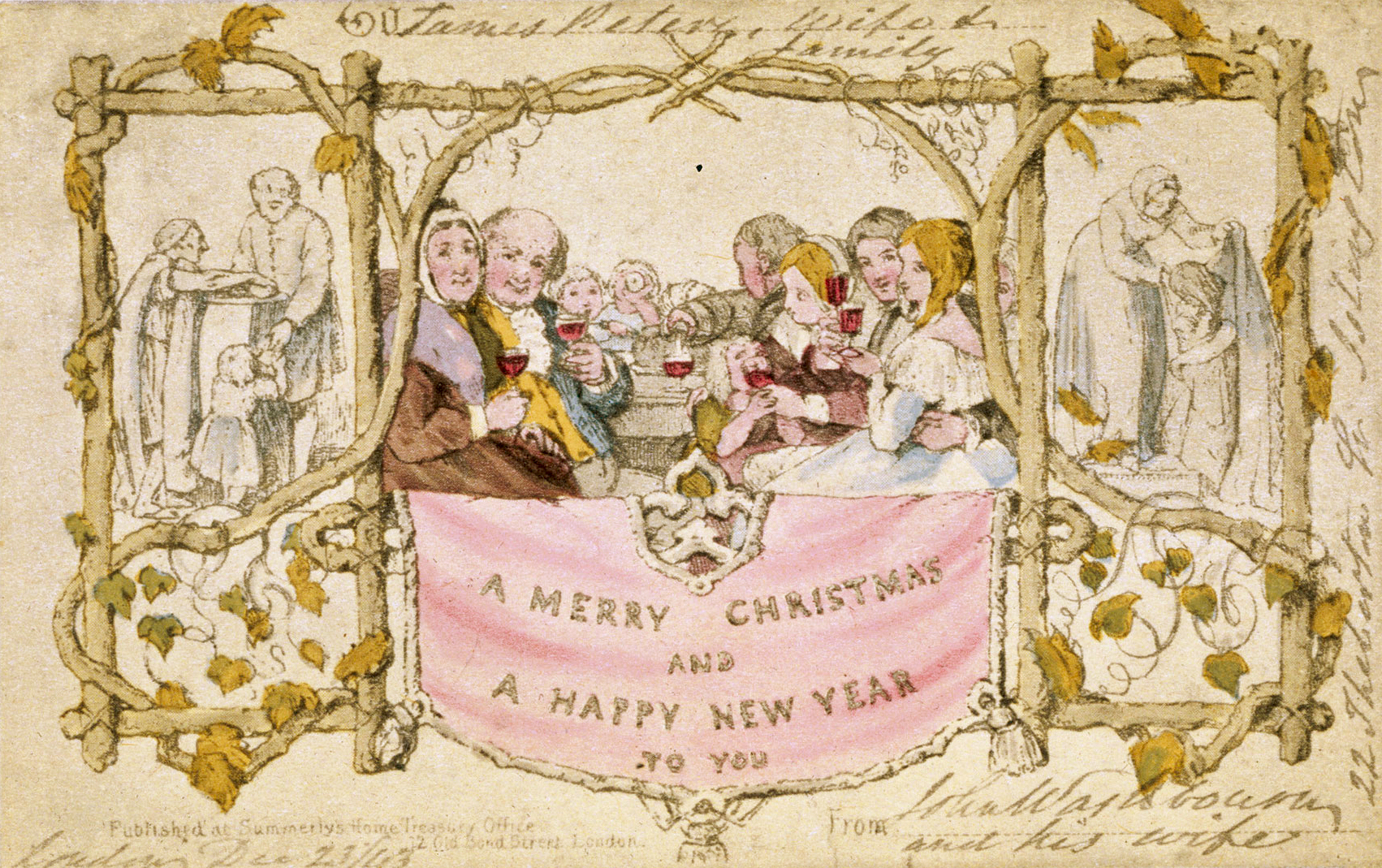
- First commercially made Christmas card

- All Saints Library within Greater Manchester, UK
- Location: All Saints Library, Manchester Metropolitan University, England
- Coordinates: 53.47053°N 2.23872°W
- Website: MMU Special Collections – Victorian Ephemera

Laura Seddon Greeting Card Collection is a collection of 19th to early 20th century British greeting cards, housed in the All Saints Library of Manchester Metropolitan University, England. The collection contains 32,000 cards by various publishers, including Britain's first commercially-produced Christmas card. Laura Seddon donated her collection to the university in 1992.

== Overview ==
The collection consists of a section of 32,000 Victorian and Edwardian greeting cards by major publishers of the day. It includes cards printed by hand such as those produced by Sockl and Nathan and also mass-produced cards (a subsequent production method) like those produced by Marcus Ward & Co and Raphael Tuck & Sons. Some of the cards hold special significance, for example Britain's first commercially produced Christmas card dating from 1843.

The collection is catalogued in Laura Seddon's book A Gallery of Greetings. Another section of the collection includes 450 Valentine's Day cards dating from the early 19th century, which Seddon also catalogued. The cards vary from loving to crude and show a different side to the Victorian values that might be expected. The cards include fake wedding certificates, cards that make references to haliotis and others that suggest that the recipient may face being "left on the shelf".

== History ==
Laura Seddon got the idea for this collection after attending a presentation by Sir Harry Page, a Manchester City Council treasurer, where she saw his collection which included 276 bound scrap-albums created between 1752 and 1935. Page's aim had been to avoid collections of press cuttings but to try to find writings, paintings, "the prints and scraps" which had been gathered together by "young ladies". He had gathered many of these but his collection had spread its focus but always retaining a discernment.

Page's meta-collection suggested to Seddon that she might create her own collection. She decided to focus on early greeting cards from both the Victorian and Edwardian periods.

The card collection was curated by Seddon over a period of 20 years initially using George Buday's book History of the Christmas Card. The collection became so important that she was able to donate it to Manchester Metropolitan University. Seddon became an Honorary Fellow of the university in 1992 in recognition of her donation and achievement. Together with the Sir Harry Page collection (which was purchased by this university), these makes up the two Victorian Ephemera collections of the MMU Special Collections.
