= ASTRA Museum =

ASTRA National Museum Complex
- Complexul Naţional Muzeal "ASTRA"
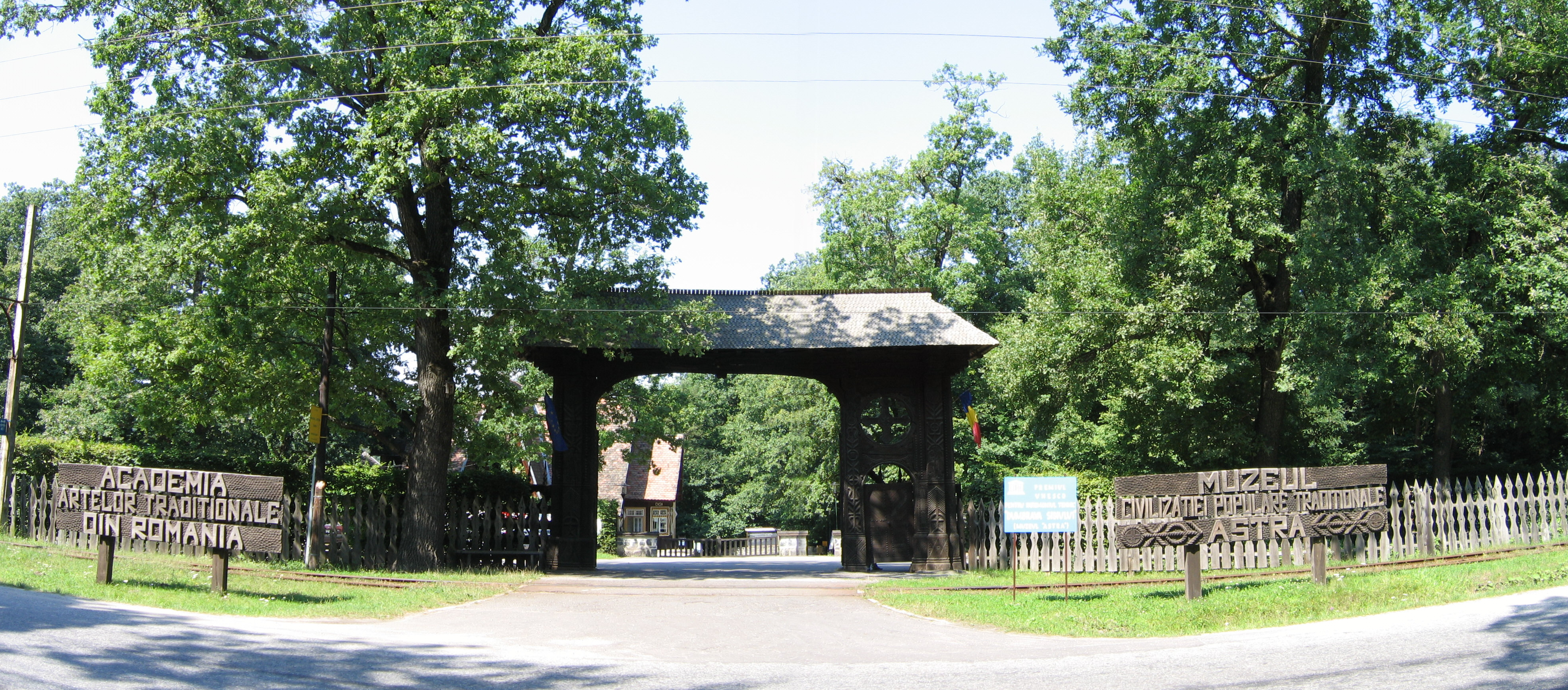
- The main entrance of the ASTRA National Museum Complex open-air museum.
- Established: 1905
- Location: Sibiu, Romania
- Coordinates: 45.7707°N 24.1445°E
- Type: Ethnology and Civilisation Museums
- Website: Official website

"ASTRA" National Museum Complex (Romanian: Complexul Naţional Muzeal "ASTRA") is a museum complex in Sibiu, Romania, which gathers under the same authority four ethnology and civilisation museums in the city, a series of laboratories for conservation and research, and a documentation centre. It is the successor of the ASTRA Museum that has existed in the city since 1905. Its modern life started with the opening of The Museum of Folk Technology in 1964, now The "ASTRA" Museum of the Traditional Folk Civilization.

== History ==
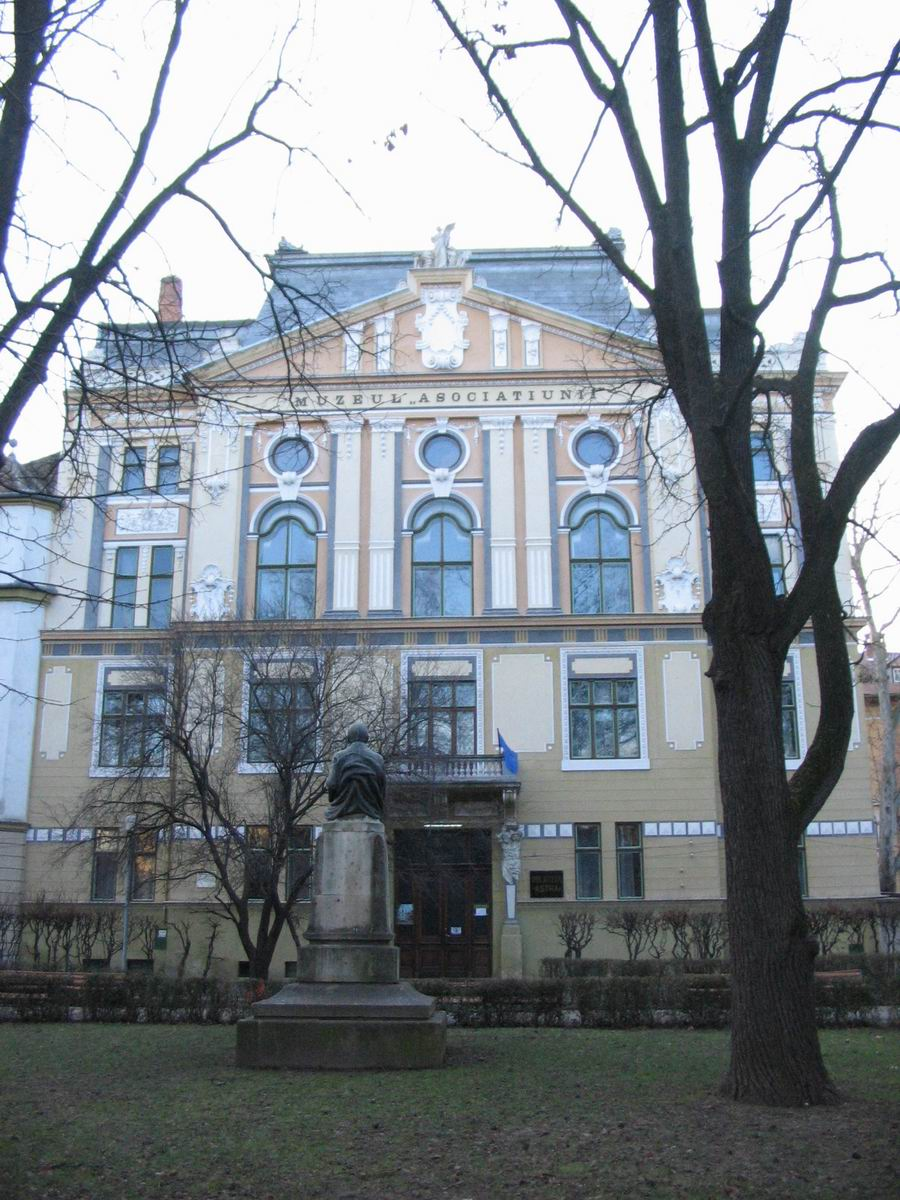
ASTRA Palace.

The Romanian cultural association ASTRA decided in 1897 to establish a museum of Romanian civilisation as a "shelter for keeping the past". The museum was opened in 1905, under the supervision of Cornel Diaconovici, in what is today the ASTRA Palace in Sibiu, built through a public subscription with the specific purpose of creating a museum. In 1929, in Cluj, an open-air Ethnographic Museum of Transylvania was created, and in 1932 the Village Museum was opened in Bucharest by Dimitrie Gusti.

In 1940, after the loss of Northern Transylvania to Hungary due to the Second Vienna Award, a plan was proposed to establish a new ethnographic museum in Sibiu to replace the one in Cluj. World War II and the new communist government of Romania delayed the establishment of the new museum by 20 years, in which period the old ASTRA Museum was closed due to ideological reasons. Due to the work of Cornel Irimie in the late 1950s and early '60s, the Romanian Academy decided to pursue the project of establishing the Sibiu open-air museum, having folk technology as its main theme. The Folk Technology Museum (the Romanian word is more literally "technique", because in Romanian technologie has specifically modern connotations) was established in [1963] and was opened to the public in 1967. Until 1990 the museum worked as a branch of the Brukenthal Museum Complex and in this period it increased the number of houses and buildings. Beginning in 1971, it started to orient itself towards folk civilisation by also including elements of folk life such as houses and community buildings. Since 2001 the museum has functioned as a museum complex, also comprising the "Franz Binder" Museum of Universal Ethnography, the "ASTRA" Museum of Transylvanian Civilisation, both opened in 1993, and the "Emil Sigerus" Museum of Saxon Ethnography and Folk Art opened in 1998. Since 1990 it has used the ASTRA name to reflect its heritage.

== Museum of Traditional Folk Civilization ==
The "ASTRA" Museum of Traditional Folk Civilization (Romanian: Muzeul Civilizaţiei Populare Tradiţionale "ASTRA") is located in the Dumbrava Forest, 3 km south of Sibiu, on the road towards Rășinari, and is easily accessible by car, bus or tramway. Occupying an area of 0.96 square kilometres, it is the largest open-air museum in Romania and one of the largest in Central and Eastern Europe. It contains houses and workshops of the traditional Romanian folk culture from the pre-industrial era. Over 300 houses and other buildings are situated in the forest around two artificial lakes with over 10 km of walkways between them.

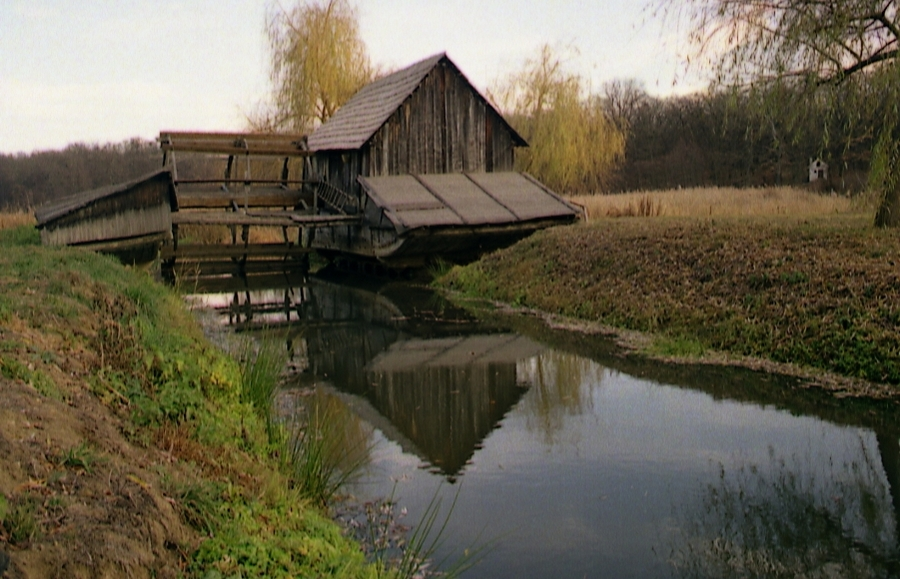
A mill in the Museum of the Traditional Folk Civilization.

The exhibits are organised into six thematic groups:

- food production and animal husbandry
- production of raw materials
- means of transportation
- manufacture of household objects
- public buildings
- an exposition of monumental sculpture

Some of the most spectacular buildings are a group of windmills from the Dobrudja area, a playing area for popice (skittles, an early form of bowling) from the Păltiniş monastery, a small mine from the Apuseni Mountains, a few water-mills, a wooden ferry, and a fishery from the Danube Delta. Also there are houses of shepherds, pottery workshops, iron workshops and others. There is also a working inn, a small pub and a dance pavilion. In the museum there is a wooden church from northern Transylvania brought in 1990-1992 from the village of Bezded in Sălaj County.

A series of festivals and fairs take place in the museum annually, the most popular one being The Folk Craftsmen's Fair which takes place each summer around the Saint Mary's Dormition, an Orthodox holiday in the middle of August. Also, permanent and temporary exhibitions can be seen in a special pavilion inside the museum.

== Museum of Universal Ethnography ==
The "Franz Binder" Museum of Universal Ethnography (Romanian: Muzeul de Etnografie Universală "Franz Binder") is the only museum in Romania that specialises in non-European ethnology. It was opened in 1993 in a house known as the Hermes House, on the Small Square in Sibiu's old city centre. It was based around an initial group of artifacts collected by the members of the Transylvanian Association for Natural Sciences (German: Siebenburgische Verein fur Naturwissenschaften) in the 19th and the beginning of the 20th century. The collections were expanded after the museum's opening, and now number over 3000 items.

The museum is named after Franz Binder, a merchant and a diplomat who spent more than 20 years in Africa at the middle of the 19th century. A particularly remarkable piece in the museum is an ancient Egyptian mummy donated by the Austro-Hungarian consul in Egypt in 1907, Hermann von Hannenheim. Dr. med. Arthur Soterius von Sachsenheim donated a collection of over 100 ethnographic objects gathered during his travels and expeditions to various parts of the world. The newer collections contain artifacts from Japan, Indonesia, Ecuador and the Democratic Republic of the Congo. In addition, over 400 pieces have been donated from the gifts fund donated to the Romanian Presidency between 1965 and 1989.

== Museum of Transylvanian Civilisation ==
The "ASTRA" Museum of Transylvanian Civilisation (Romanian: Muzeul Civilizaţiei Transilvane "ASTRA") was conceived as the keeper and the developer of the ASTRA Museum's collections. At its closure, some of its collections, numbering over 50,000 items out of which over 15,000 were in the ethnographic collection, were passed over to the Brukenthal Museum. In the period before 1990, all the ethnographic collections were organised under the Folk Art Section. After the creation of the Museum of Traditional Folk Civilization, these collections were handed over to the new museum, and in 1993 the Museum of Transylvanian Civilisation was established to present the Transylvanian culture and civilisation in an inter-ethnic and interdisciplinary vision.

The museum contains a collection of over 40,000 items, out of which almost 10,000 are recorded under the classification A, for most valuable. The collection contains clothing, textiles, pottery, religious objects and other items made of wood, iron or bone. They are organised in the museum's building, situated in the city centre in the Small Square. A new step in the museum's evolution is planned after the move to its new establishment in the ASTRA Palace, which is now occupied by the Sibiu County Library. The museum plans to extend its collections so that it can better present the civilisation from Transylvania as a European region, in which many ethnic groups have coexisted.

== Museum of Saxon Ethnography ==
The "Emil Sigerus" Museum of Saxon Ethnography and Folk Art (Romanian: Muzeul de Etnografie şi Artă Populară Săsească "Emil Sigerus"; German: Das Museum der sächsischen Volkskunde und Volkskunst "Emil Sigerus") was established in an attempt to fill a gap, presenting the role of the Transylvanian Saxons ethnic group in Transylvanian and Romanian culture. The museum's collections are based around those from the Carpathians Transylvanian Museum or MSVK opened in 1895 by the Siebenbürgischer Karpatenverein association. The first exposition was inside the Museum of Natural History building and was organised around the collection of Emil Sigerus, the most important collector of Transylvanian Saxon Folk Art at the end of the 19th century. In 1920 the museum's collections were included in the Brukenthal Museum and they were displayed in a new space inside the Brukenthal Palace; from 1950, they were included in the Folk Art Section.

After the establishment of the new Museum of Traditional Folk Civilization in 1990, the Saxon collections were given over to the new establishment along with all other ethnology-related collections. In 1997, the Emil Sigerus Museum was opened in a building adjacent to the Franz Binder Museum in the Small Square. After the end of the restoration project restoring The House of the Arts in the Small Square, the museum will have a more appropriate space to exhibit its collections of over 2,700 ceramic pieces, including the permanent exposition of decorative tiles, over 4,000 objects in the classifications of costumes, textiles and embroideries and over 400 wooden, metal, or bone objects out of which over 150 are painted furniture items.

== Departments ==
Besides the four museums, the "ASTRA" National Museum Complex contains a series of other departments related to its activity:

- The Cornel Irimie Memorial Cabinet contains the personal collection of the founder of the Museum of Folk Technology and also the foremost personality in the field of ethnological and rural sociological studies to have worked in the Sibiu's Museums.
- The Information and Documentation Center groups together the museum's library, archive and publishing house.
- The "ASTRA" Film Studio is specialised in documentary film production. It evolved from the museum's audio-visual department. It organises a biennial documentary film festival, an important one in the Central and Eastern Europe.
- The Conservation and Restoration Department handles over 60,000 items in the museum's patrimony.

== Projects ==
One of the most important projects of the museum complex is the opening of a new museum named The Museum of Culture and Civilisation of the Romany. This project is attempting to bring together cultural artifacts of the Roma people (also known as Romanys), the only significant ethnic group in Romania that does not yet have a museum.

In 2007, Sibiu was, along with Luxembourg, the European Capital of Culture. The museum organised a series of events to promote the Folk Traditions in Romania.
