= Piața Sfatului Orthodox Church =

Heritage site in Braşov County, Romania

Coordinates: 45°38′34″N 25°35′22″E

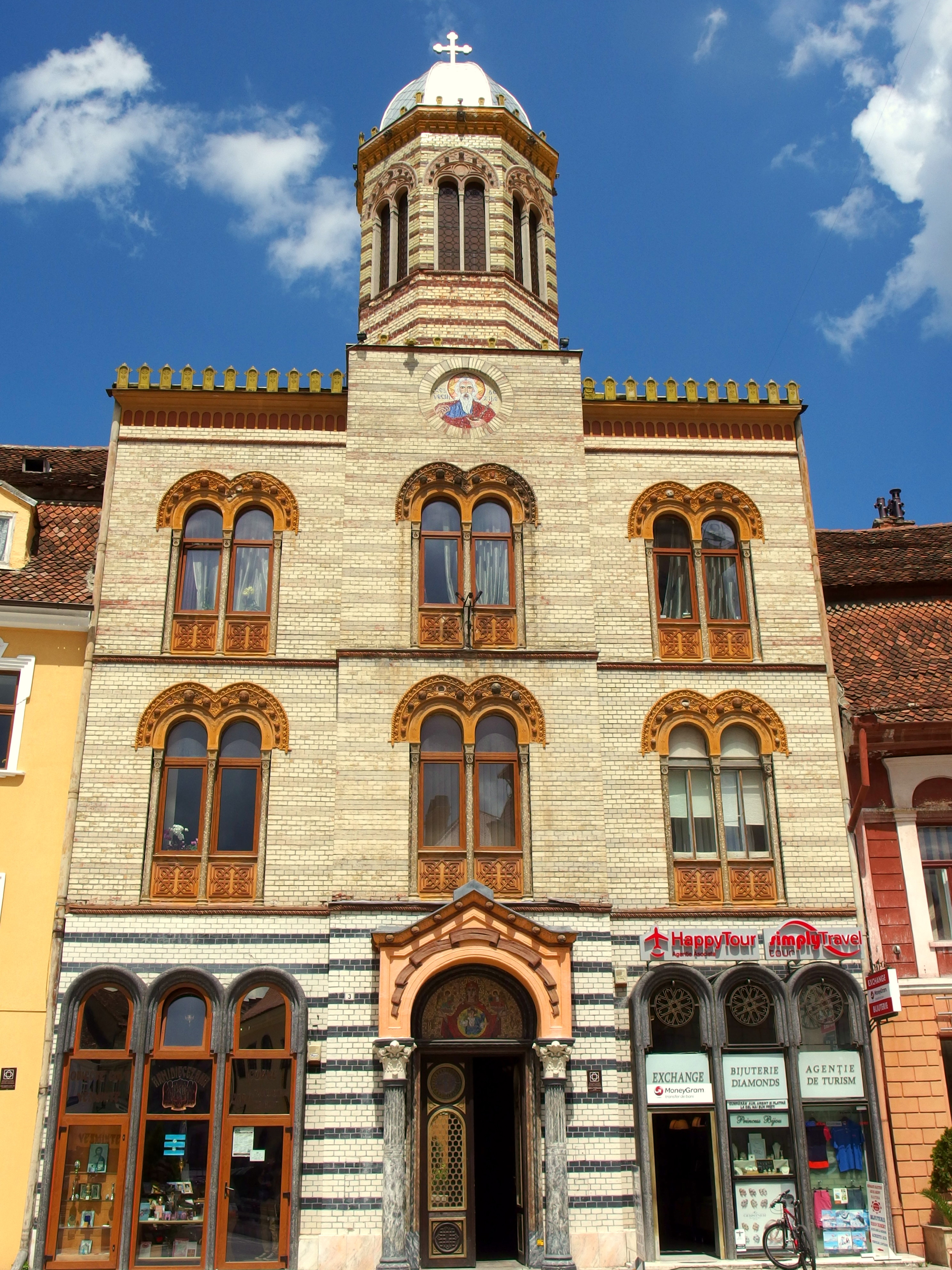
Piața Sfatului Orthodox Church

The Piața Sfatului Orthodox Church is a Romanian Orthodox church located at 3 Piața Sfatului, Brașov, Romania. It is dedicated to the Dormition of the Theotokos.

A small one-room chapel opened inside the Brașov Citadel in 1829. In 1866, due to deterioration, it was closed down, its congregants assigned to the Greek Church. In 1895, Archbishop Miron Romanul laid the cornerstone of the present church, which was dedicated by his successor Ioan Mețianu in 1899. The church represented a symbolic advance for the city's Romanians, from the peripheral St. Nicholas into the main square, traditionally a Saxon space.

The style is neo-Byzantine, with a central dome and bell tower. It measures 26.6 by 12.3 meters. A spire facing Piața Sfatului was added later. This collapsed during the 1940 Vrancea earthquake and was rebuilt in 1973. The iconostasis is carved and gilt, and was painted in 1898. The interior painting, dating to 1937, was restored in 1965–1966, 1985 and 2005.

The church is listed as a historic monument by Romania's Ministry of Culture and Religious Affairs.
