= Sockl and Nathan =

Former British publishing company

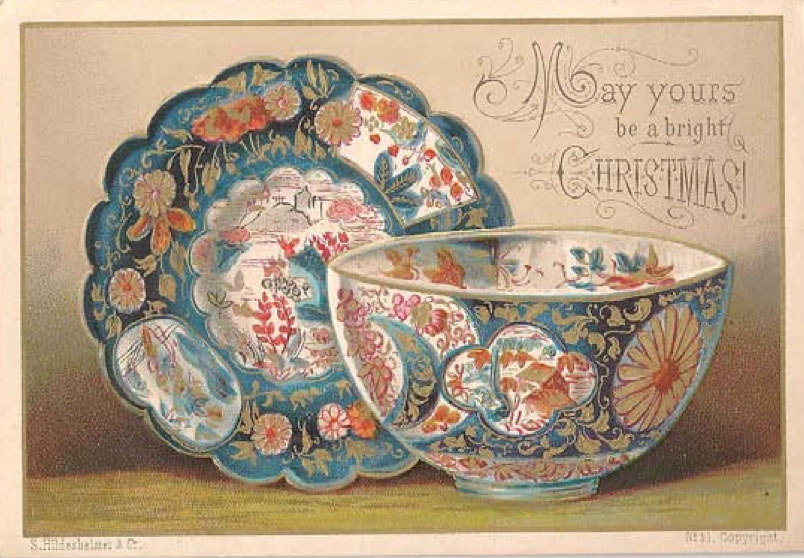
- A Sockl & Nathan Christmas card from 1895
- Company type: Private
- Industry: Greeting cards, publishing
- Founders: Victor Sockl, Saul Nathan
- Defunct: February 1897
- Fate: Dissolved
- Headquarters: London, UK

Sockl and Nathan were a 19th-century British greeting card and publishing company with headquarters in London. It was created and managed by Victor Sockl and Saul Nathan.

== History ==
The company was as a partnership between Victor Franz Thedor Sockl, a son of the painters Theodor Sockl and Clara Adelheid Sockl, née Soterius von Sachsenheim, and Saul Nathan. Victor Sockl, his brother Carl Sockl, and Carl's family had emigrated from the Austrian Empire to Britain in the second half of the 19th century, most likely seeking to avoid conscription and escape the unrest in Central Europe after the Revolutions of 1848. Carl Sockl was the accountant of the company.

The company specialised in producing reproductions of paintings. Their cards were printed by hand in Leipzig, Germany, a production method that preceded mass production of greeting cards. The business, based at 4 Hamsell Street, City of London, was very successful for a time and obtained a Royal Warrant. Often its cards did not bear the company name, but were simply marked "copyright" because of fear of persecution due to "Nathan" being a Jewish name. The company functioned also as a publishing house under the same name. They published illustrated books of children's poems.

After a fire in an adjacent property caused extensive damage to its stock, the company struggled to survive. Eventually, it fell into decline, due mainly to competition from the emerging industry of mass-produced greeting cards. The partners dissolved the company in February 1897.

A collection of about 200 cards remained in the propriety of the Sockl family. In the late 1980s seven cards were reproduced by the Medici Society for a number of years. In the 1990s about 100 were sold to an art dealer and exhibited in his gallery in Wimbledon, London. The remaining 100 were donated to the Ephemera Society. Approximately 53 cards can be found in the extensive Laura Seddon Greeting Card Collection, cataloged in her book A Gallery Of Greetings (1992). The collection is now at the Manchester Metropolitan University, part of their Victorian Ephemera Collection, housed in the Sir Kenneth Green Library, on the All Saints Campus.

== Reception ==
Sockl and Nathan greeting cards were featured in the magazines and journals of the times, especially in the 1880s. Included in the novel card concepts launched by this company were those styled as autograph cards.

== Gallery ==
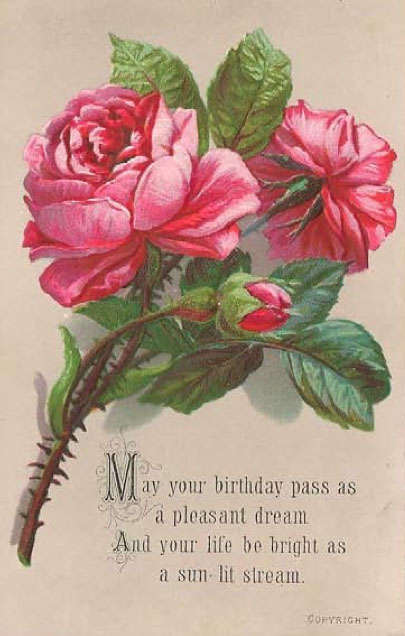

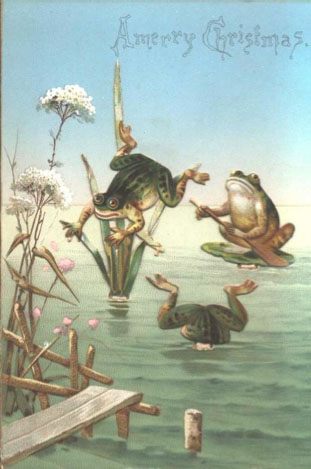

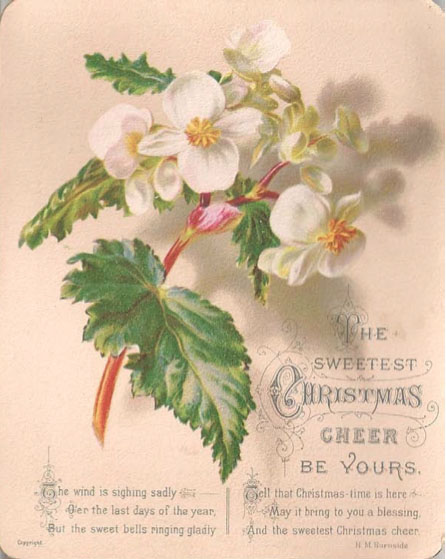

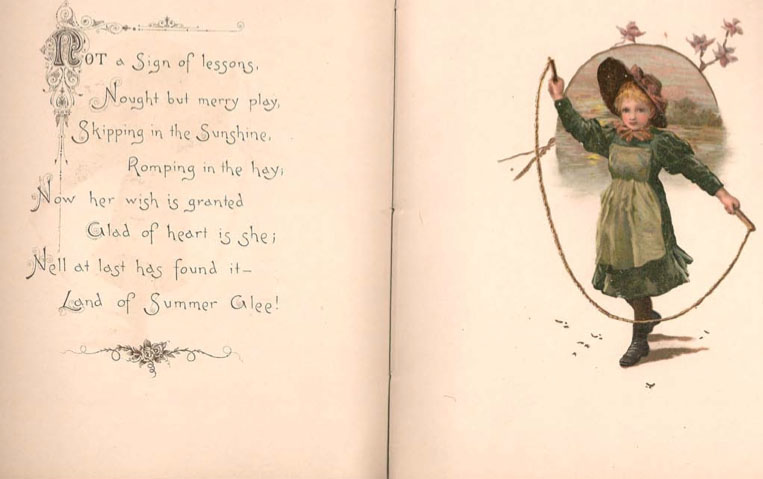
