= Sophie von Scherer =

Austrian writer (1817–1876)

Sophie Ritter von Scherer
- Born: Sophie Sockl; 5 February 1817; Vienna
- Died: 29 May 1876 (aged 59); Graz
- Occupations: painter (in her youth) writer
- Spouse: Anton Ritter von Scherer
- Children: Rudolf Ritter von Scherer; Moritz; Sophie; Ernestine
- Writing career
- Language: German

Sophie Ritter von Scherer (5 February 1817, Vienna - 29 May 1876, Graz) was an Austrian writer.

== Life ==
Sophie von Scherer, née Sockl, was born in Vienna, the daughter of the master cabinet-maker and inventor, Johann Gottlieb Sockl and Sophie, née Shurer von Waldheim. Among her siblings was the painter and photographer Theodor Sockl. In her youth she was a painter, but later turned to writing. Sophie married Anton Ritter von Scherer in 1841 and was the mother of the well-known Graz and Vienna religious law professor Rudolf Ritter von Scherer (1845-1918).

In 1848, she published her 3 volumes educational work, a novelty in the form of an epistolary novel. On the one hand, there was practical parenting advice for women of the middle and upper classes, and on the other hand Sophie wrote about the specific obligations of women, defined primarily as wives and mothers. Even though she was against the Revolution of 1848, she supported social reforms, such as financial and social improvements in the status of the domestic servants, old-age insurance, kindergartens, measures of child care and child support for socially vulnerable families.

In the autumn of the year 1848, in the context of the recently granted freedom of the press, in an open letter dated 17 November 1848, she made an appeal "in the interest of the Catholic faith" at the first German bishops' conference in Würzburg. As a devout Catholic loyal to Rome, she opposed this emerging group of German Catholics and presented her ecclesiastical reform considerations, such as the worship simplification by omitting litanies and prayers not directly related to the Catholic faith, the introduction of the vernacular German in worship or the abolition of celibacy in order to overcome the gap between the priests and laity. While the church ignored it, the letter triggered a family dispute. Her brother, the Catholic Viennese painter Theodor Sockl, attacked her in a subsequent open letter, accusing her of Protestant convictions. In her turn, she invalidated her brother's arguments in a public reply (this would be her last publication).

Sophie von Scherer advocated the necessity of a legal framework for social security and state family support about 100 years before their introduction.

== Works ==
- Bildungs- und Erziehungs-Werk. Erfahrungen aus dem Frauenleben zum Selbststudium für Frauen, Mütter, Töchter (Education and educational work. Lessons from the life of a woman for the self-study of wives, mothers, daughters), Gratz, 1848
- Two open letters concerning reforms in the Catholic church:

- Offenes Sendschreiben an den Congress der hochwürdigsten Erzbischofe und Bischöfe zu Würzburg… Gratz, 17 November 1848, published by J.A. Kienreich. It is kept at Steiermärkische Landesbibliothek, Booknumber: A4Z211, Katzoom-Zettel Nr. 183966.
- Erwiederung auf den an mich gerichteten offenen Brief meines Bruders über mein offenes Sendschreiben an den Congreß…, Gratz 1848, published by J.A. Kienreich. The location of this letter is currently unknown.
