= Transylvanian Museum =

Museum in Gundelsheim

- Siebenbürgisches Museum
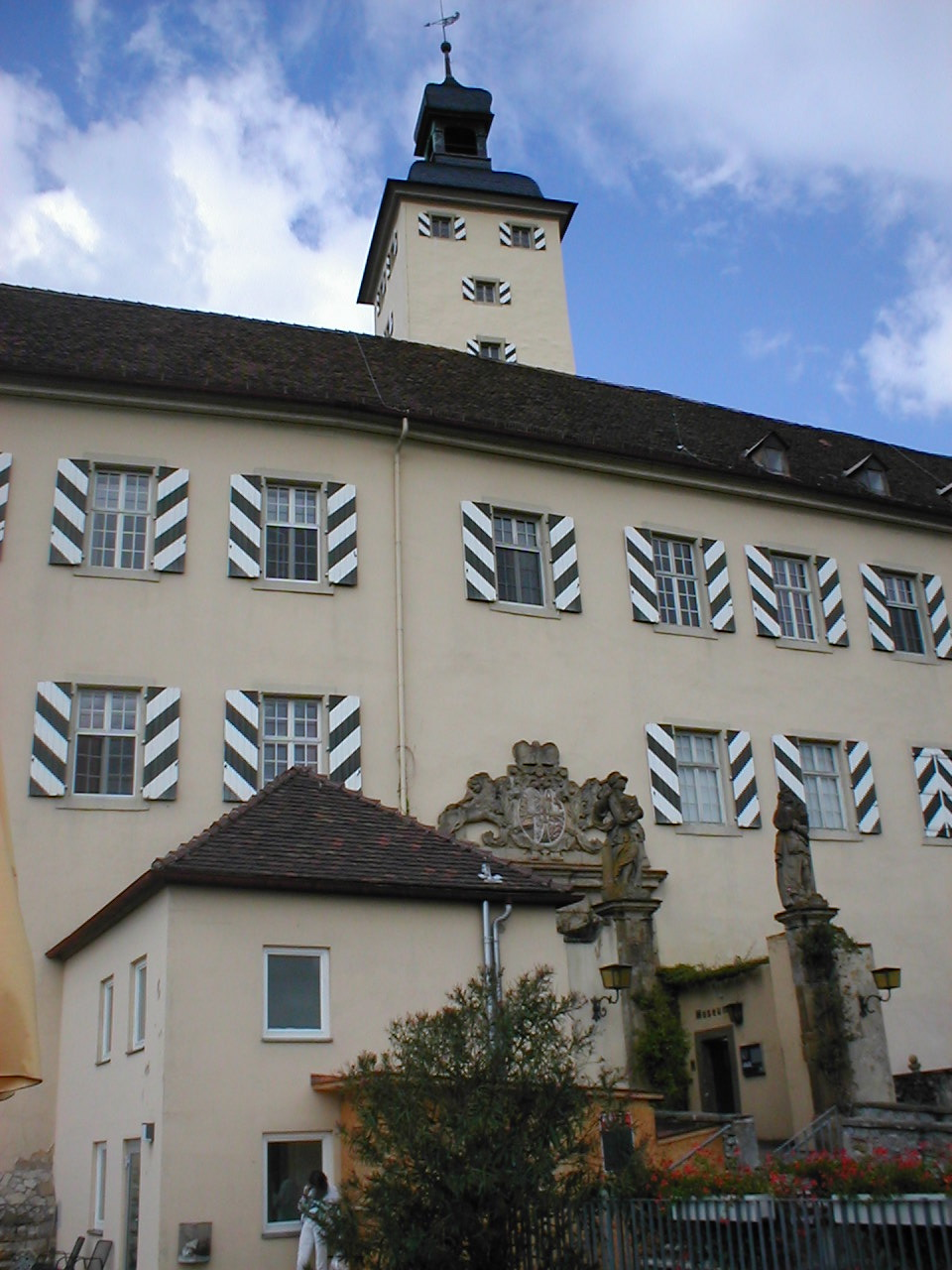
- Museum entrance at the Horneck Castle

- Transylvanian Museum location in Gundelsheim, Germany Transylvanian Museum (Germany)
- Established: 1968
- Location: Gundelsheim, Germany
- Coordinates: 49°17′12″N 9°09′23″E
- Website: http://www.siebenbuergisches-museum.de/

The Transylvanian Museum (German: Siebenbürgisches Museum) is a museum situated in Gundelsheim, Germany, dedicated to the protection, preservation and documentation of the cultural heritage of the Transylvanian Saxons and of their coexistence with the other Transylvanian ethnic groups in this multi-ethnic region.

== History ==
The initial core of the museum was a collection of Transylvanian ethnographic objects gathered in Munich by Lore Connerth-Seraphin at the beginning of the 1950s. After moving into the nursing home for the elderly in the Horneck Castle, Gundelsheim, she donated the now extensive collection to the Self-help Association (Hilfsverein) "Johannes Honterus". In 1968, it was opened as a mixed museum, functioning both as the city museum of Gundelsheim and as the heritage museum of the Transylvanian Saxons. In 1991, it received the national museum status. In 1997, the inner courtyard of the castle was roofed over and made available for the museum as a central space.

In 1999, the German federal government requested a merger between this museum and the Danube Swabian Central Museum of Ulm. The Territorial Association of the Transylvanian Saxons in Germany opposed this plan, as they wanted to maintain the unity of its facilities (Transylvanian Institute, Transylvanian Museum and Transylvanian Library) in Gundelsheim. This position was supported by the state government of Baden-Württemberg. In June 2003, the federal government abandoned its plans.

== Building ==
The museum is housed in the Horneck Castle, Gundelsheim. It shares the building with the Transylvanian Institute, the Transylvanian Library, as well as a nursing home for the elderly dedicated to Transylvanian Saxons relocated to Germany. The rooms of the museum are on the ground floor and first floor. The museum entrance is separate from those of the other facilities.

== Collections ==
The collections of the museum include material and objects about the history of the Transylvanian Saxons, their social system and rituals, the education system and also their rural and urban life.

The museum also holds a collection of Transylvanian Saxon artists. It owns the 1853 self-portrait of Clara Adelheid Soterius von Sachsenheim and a portrait she painted of her husband, Theodor Sockl, from the same year. The museum also has some paintings by Theodor Sockl himself. In 1998, the Transylvanian Museum staged a retrospective exhibition of the painter Edith Soterius von Sachsenheim and bought 50 of her works. In 1999, this collection was also exhibited in Munich at the Haus des Deutschen Ostens.

== Reference material ==
- Siebenbürgisches Museum Gundelsheim. - Jg. 25. 2004-. - Gundelsheim: Siebenbürgisches Museum, 2004.
- Schloß Horneck. Gundelsheim am Neckar, Heimathaus Siebenbürgen, Altenheim, Museum, Bibliothek. Hrsg.: Hilfsverein der Siebenbürger Sachsen „Johannes Honterus“ e. V. Stuttgart 1972 (Heilbronner Museumsheft. Heft 3)
- Hans Meschendörfer: Schloß Horneck und Gundelsheim. Kreis Heilbronn, Württemberg. Schnell & Steiner, München 1983 (Kunstführer. Nr. 1412)
- Michael Kroner: Kulturleistungen der Siebenbürger Sachsen. P. Hedwig, Erlangen 2000 (Schriftenreihe Geschichte der Siebenbürger Sachsen und ihrer wirtschaftlich-kulturellen Leistungen. Heft 8)
- Horst Klusch: Siebenbürger Keramik. Kronstadt ?
- Horst Klusch: Siebenbürgische Töpferkunst aus drei Jahrhunderten. Kriterion-Verlag, Bukarest 1980
- Christiane Klein: Die siebenbürgisch-sächsische Keramik des 18. und 19. Jahrhunderts als Ausdruck eines spezifischen Gestaltungswillens. Dissertation München 1981
