= Rudolf von Scherer =

Austrian religious law professor

Rudolf Ritter von Scherer
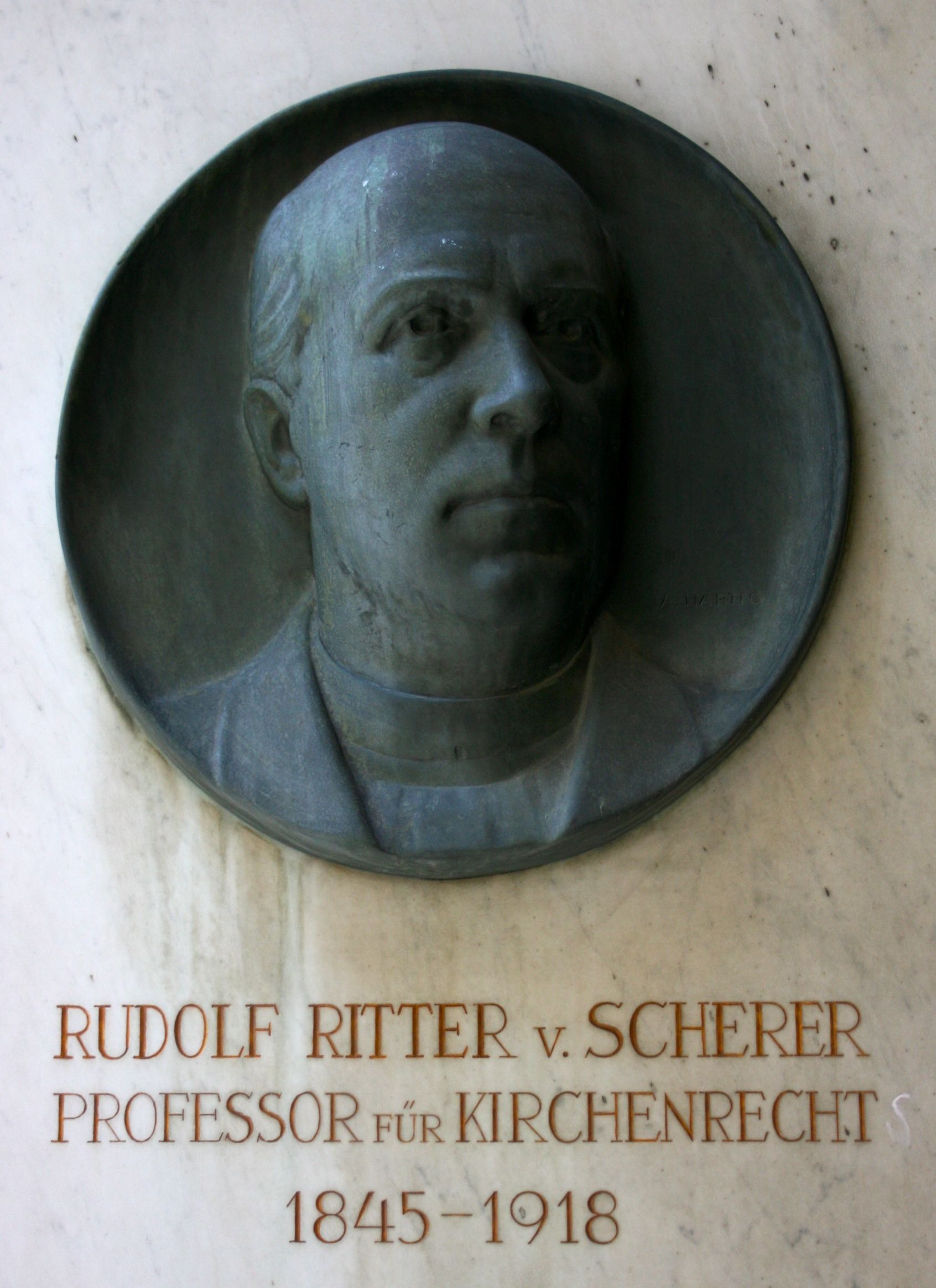
- Bust of Rudolf von Scherer in the courtyard arcade of the University of Vienna
- Born: 11 August 1845; Graz
- Died: 21 December 1918 (aged 73); Vienna
- Occupation: religious law professor
- Writing career
- Language: German
- Notable works: Handbuch des Kirchenrechtes (Textbook of religious law)

Rudolf Ritter von Scherer (11 August 1845, Graz – 21 December 1918, Vienna) was an Austrian religious law professor.

== Life ==
Rudolf von Scherer was the son of Anton Ritter von Scherer and of the writer Sophie Ritter von Scherer, née Sockl. He received his doctorate in law in 1867 at the University of Graz and was considered a disciple of Friedrich Maassen, who influenced him in the application of the historical method. Then he began the study of Catholic theology in Graz in 1869 and was ordained as a priest. After three years in pastoral ministry, he was sent to the higher education institution for secular priests the Frintaneum in Vienna, where he received his second doctorate in 1875, this time in theology. He taught at the University of Graz (from 1875), at first church history, but soon (in 1876) he became the first professor of the newly created Department of Religious Law at the Faculty of Law. In 1899 he went to the University of Vienna, where he remained until his retirement in 1912.

Scherer's major work, the textbook of religious law, Handbuch des Kirchenrechtes, garnered high praise. He published only two of the three planned volumes, the first in 1885 and the second in 1891. His creativity decreased after 1911 because of various physical ailments and also because of being distracted by the discord around the Oath Against Modernism.

He was since 1868 a member of the Catholic Student Association AV Guestfalia Tübingen.

== Writings ==
- Handbuch des Kirchenrechtes. 2 volumes. Moser, Graz 1886/1898 (PDF).

== Literature ==
- Nikolaus Grass: "Scherer Rudolf von". In: Österreichisches Biographisches Lexikon 1815–1950 (ÖBL). Vol. 10, Austrian Academy of Sciences, Vienna 1994, ISBN 3-7001-2186-5, p. 87 f. (Direct links to "p. 87", "p. 88")
- Josef Kremsmair: Rudolf Ritter von Scherer. Ein hervorragender Kanonist und seine Haltung zum Antimodernisteneid. In: Franz Pototschnig und Alfred Rinnerthaler (Hrsg.): Im Dienst von Kirche und Staat. In memoriam Carl Holböck (= Kirche und Recht. Bd. 17). Wien 1985, p. 327-346.
- Johannes Martetschläger (1995). "SCHERER, Rudolf Ritter von". In Bautz, Traugott (ed.). Biographisch-Bibliographisches Kirchenlexikon (BBKL) (in German). Vol. 9. Herzberg: Bautz. cols. 158–159. ISBN 3-88309-058-1.
- Bruno Primetshofer: Kirchenrecht. Die Kath.-Theol. Fakultät der Universität Wien. Festschrift zum 600-Jahr-Jubiläum. Hrsg. von Ernst C. Suttner. Berlin 1984, p. 213-245.
