= Piața Sfatului =

Square in Brașov, Romania

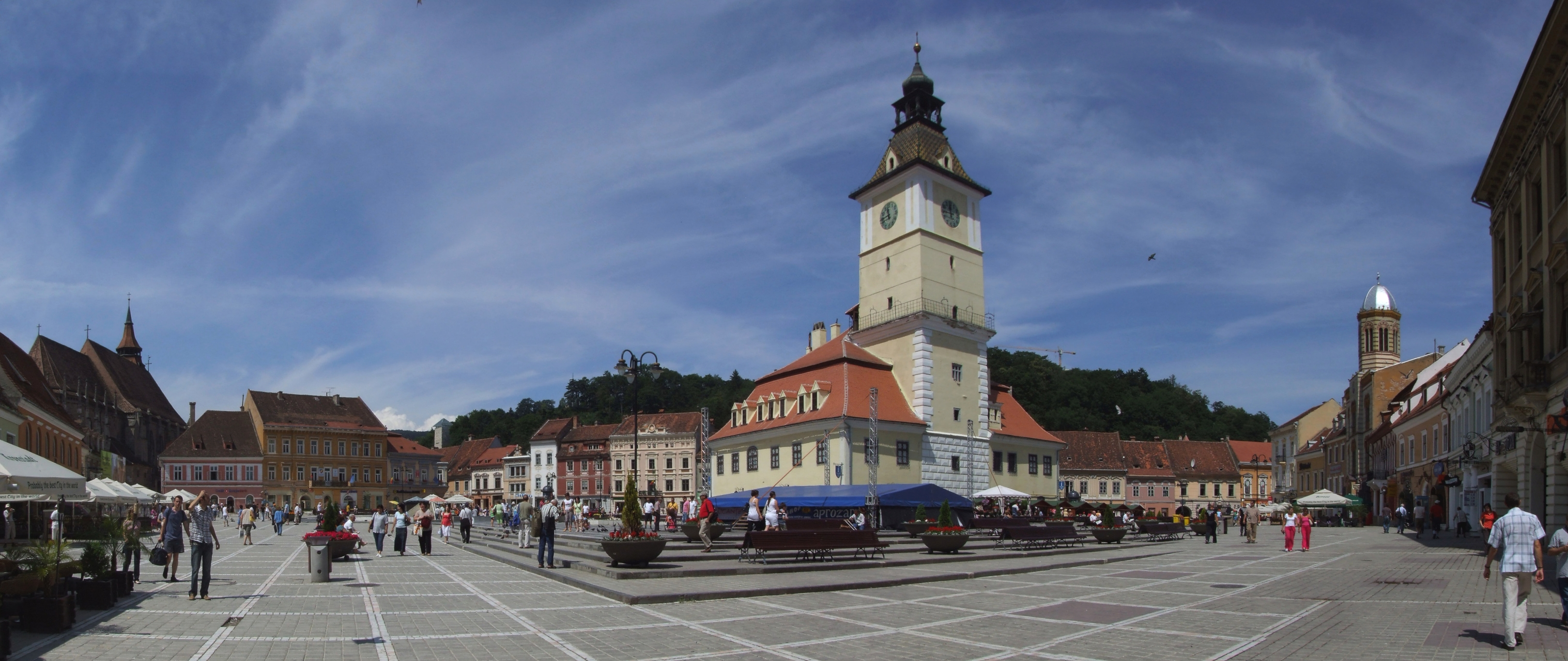
Panorama of the square including the Brașov County Museum of History.

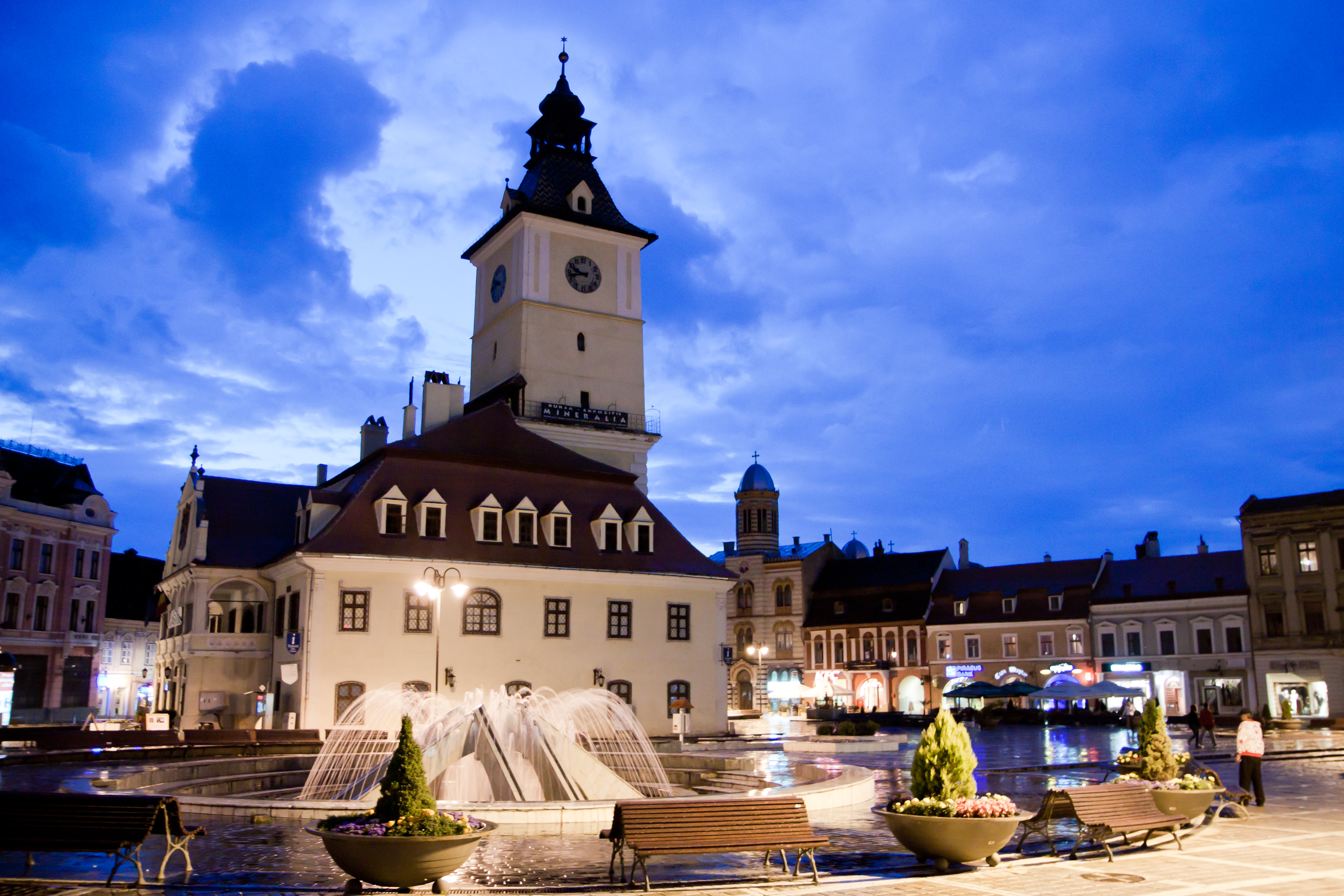
The square at night.

The square is around number 1 in this map of 17th-century Brașov.

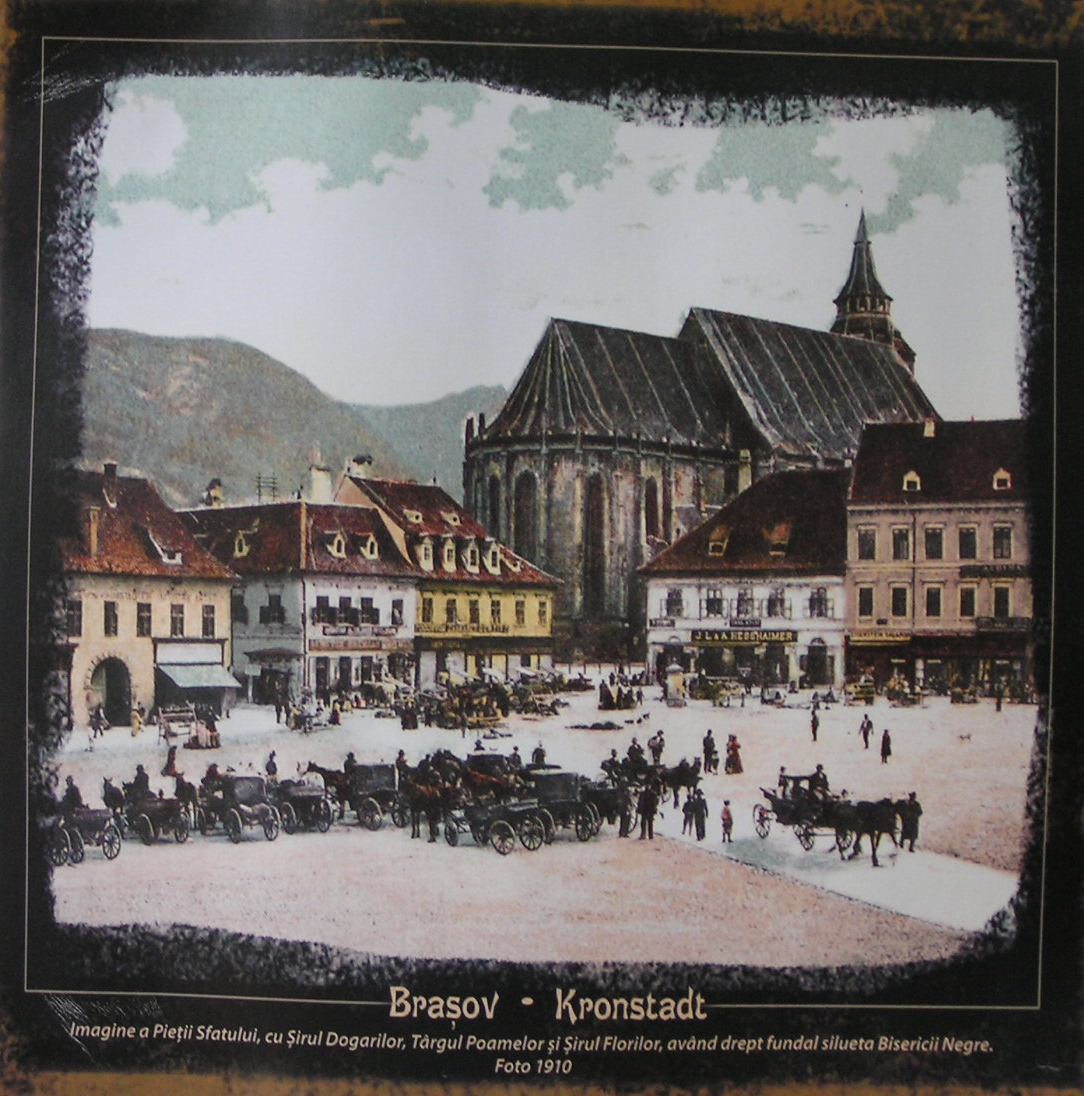
The square in 1910.

The Council Square (Piața Sfatului in Romanian, former Marktplatz in German, Főtér or Tanács tér in Hungarian) is located in the historic centre of Brașov, Romania. It obtained its right to hold markets in 1520, but it has been the place for weekly and annual markets since 1364, being visited by merchants from the country and abroad. It is surrounded by 18th-19th century houses, most of which are historical monuments.

A pillory, in the middle of the square, was used as a means for public humiliation, punishment and scorn. Witches were also punished here, but the head of the shoemaker guild, Stefan Stenert, who opposed the entry of the Austrian army into Brașov, was also beheaded here in 1688. Until 1892, there were two wells in the square. The most important building in the square is the former Council House (Casa Sfatului), which was built in 1420 and is located in the middle of the square. This now houses the Brașov County Museum of History.

Around the main square is the picturesque pedestrian-only Republicii street, the Black Church, former Council House, indoor and outdoor terraces and restaurants, the Orthodox Church, Casa Mureșenilor museum, Museum of Urban Civilization, and Hirscher House.

A local tradition holds that the children that the Pied Piper of Hamelin (Germany) sent underground appeared near this Brașov square.

In the communist era, the Council Square was named "Piața 23 August" (23 August Square).

== See also ==
- Brașov County Museum of History
