= Museum of Urban Civilization =

Museum in Brașov, Romania

Coordinates: 45.6415°N 25.5891°E

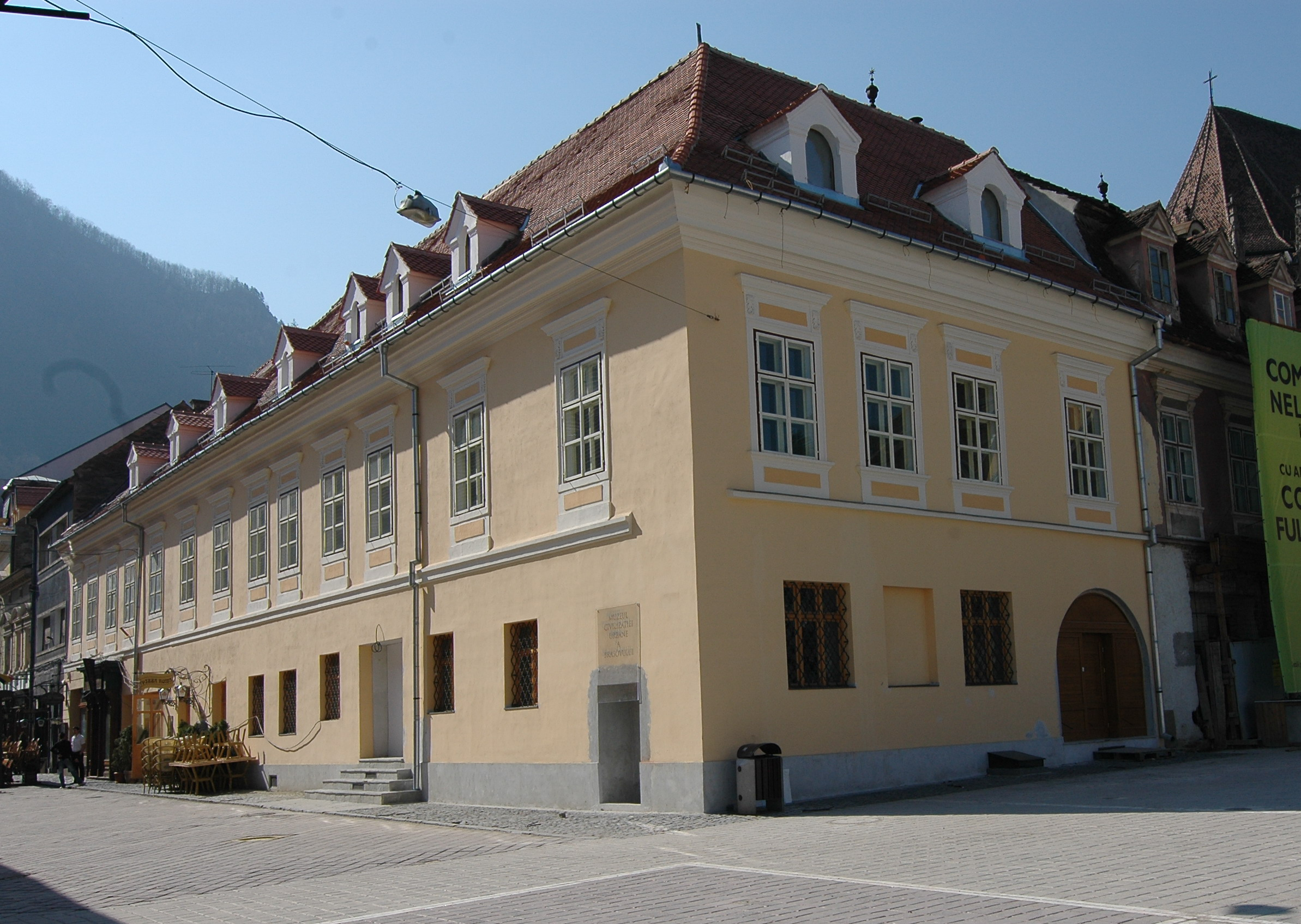
The museum building

The Museum of Urban Civilization (in Romanian: Muzeul Civilizației Urbane) is a museum in Brașov, Romania.

The museum is located on the south side of Piața Sfatului ('Town Square'), the main historical square of the city. To the north, at the centre of the square, is the historical town hall housing the Brașov County Museum of History, and to the southwest is the Black Church.

== See also ==
- Brașov County Museum of History
