= Michaelsberg (Gundelsheim) =

Hill in Württemberg, Germany

Coordinates: 49°17′34″N 9°09′15″E

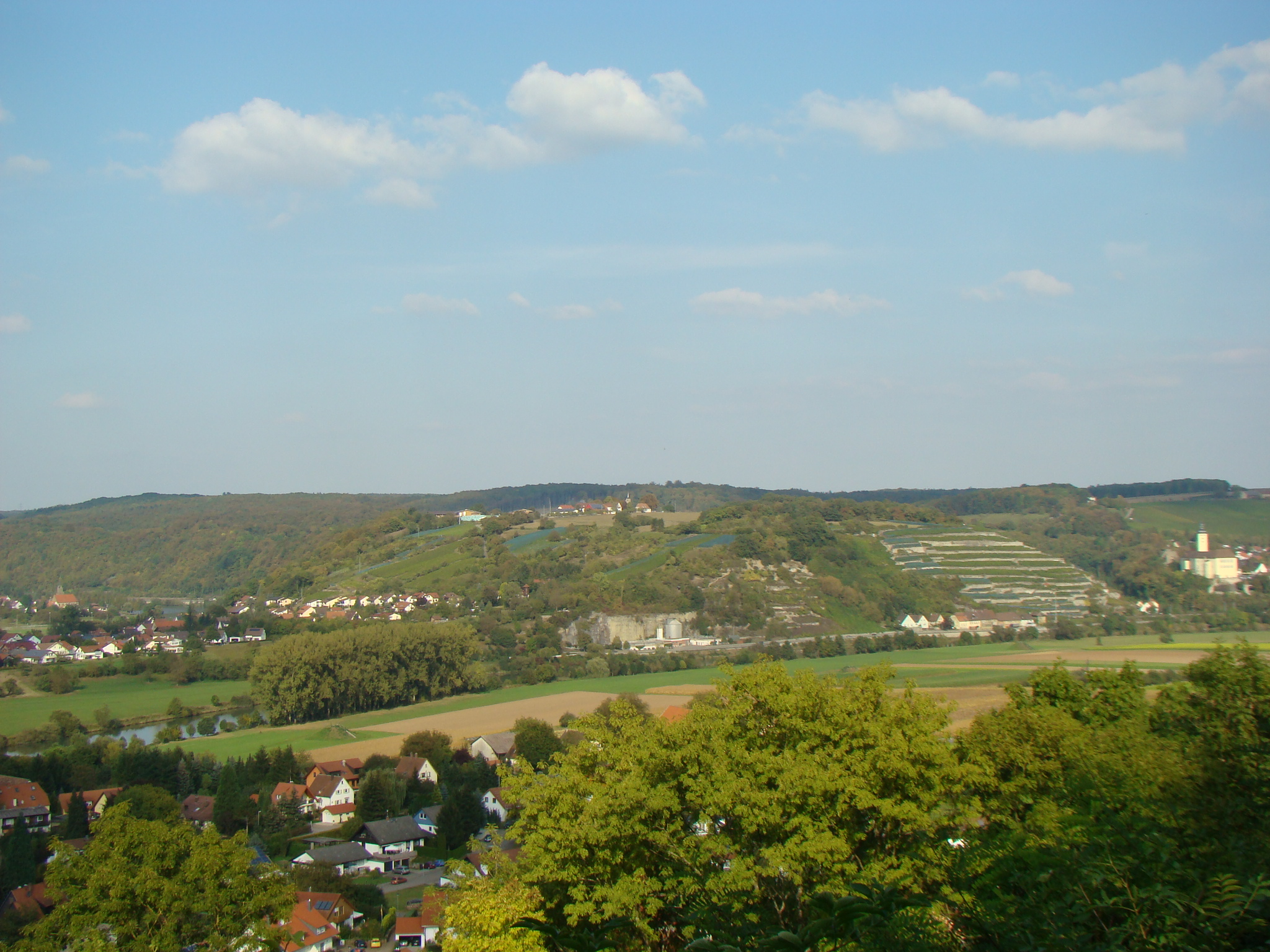

Geography
- Location: Baden-Württemberg, Germany

Michaelsberg (Gundelsheim) is a hill near Gundelsheim, Baden-Württemberg, Germany.
