= Horneck Castle, Germany =

Coordinates: 49°17′12″N 9°09′22″E

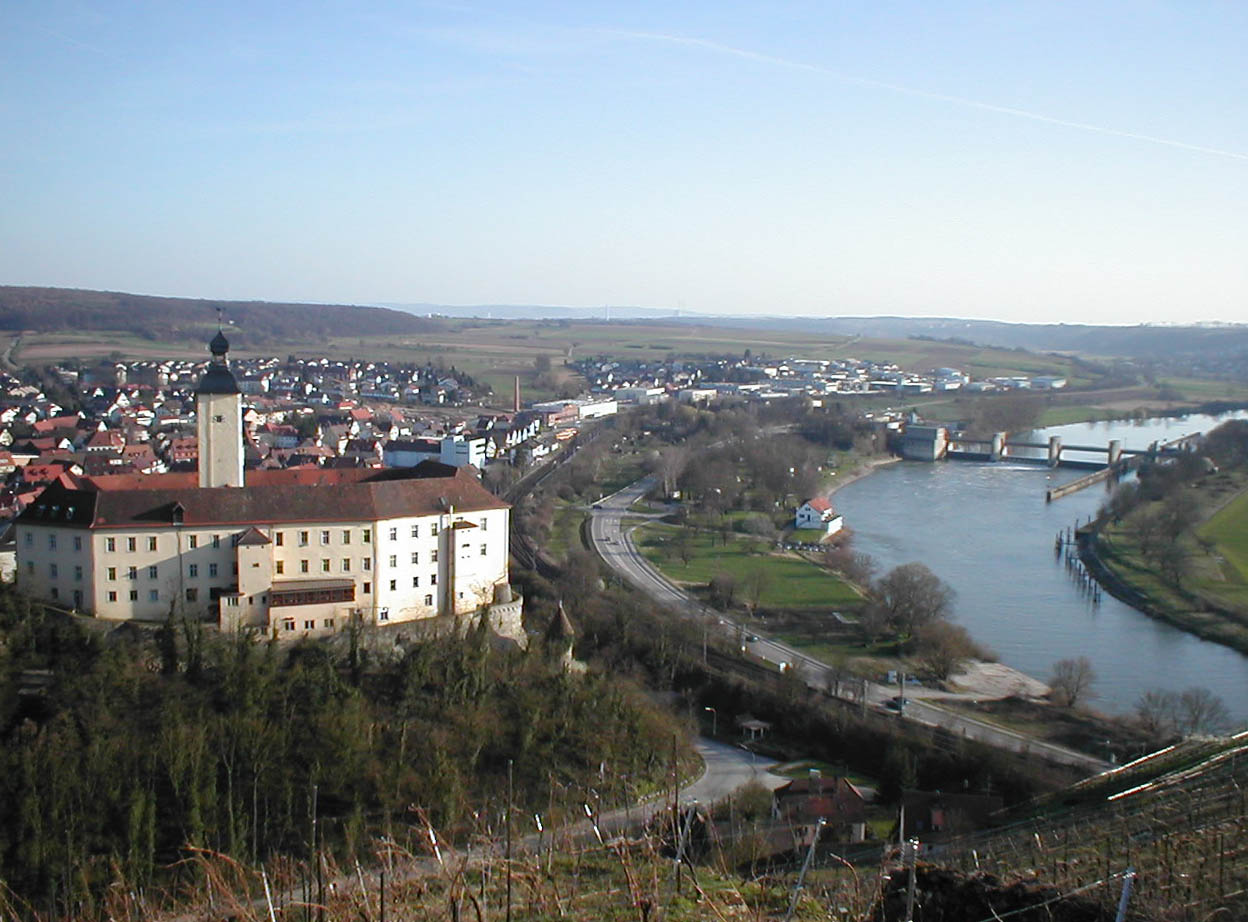
Schloss Horneck (left) viewed from Michaelsberg

Horneck Castle is also known as Burg Horneck, Deutschordenschloss Horneck and Schloss Horneck.

A castle located in the town of Gundelsheim, district of Heilbronn, Baden-Württemberg, in southwest Germany. Its name is thought to mean "over the Neckar," as it is overlooking the Neckar River.

== History ==
The castle was built around 1200 and was given to the Teutonic Order by Konrad von Horneck in 1438, thereby making it the seat of the "Deutschmeister" (German Master) until it was destroyed in 1525 by fire during the German Peasants' War. Despite reconstruction shortly after Horneck Castle's destruction, Mergentheim became the new headquarters for the Teutonic Order in that region in 1527.

As of 2006, the castle was occupied by an altenheim (a nursing home for the elderly) as well as the Transylvanian Museum.
