= Brașov County Museum of History =

- Muzeul Județean de Istorie – Brașov
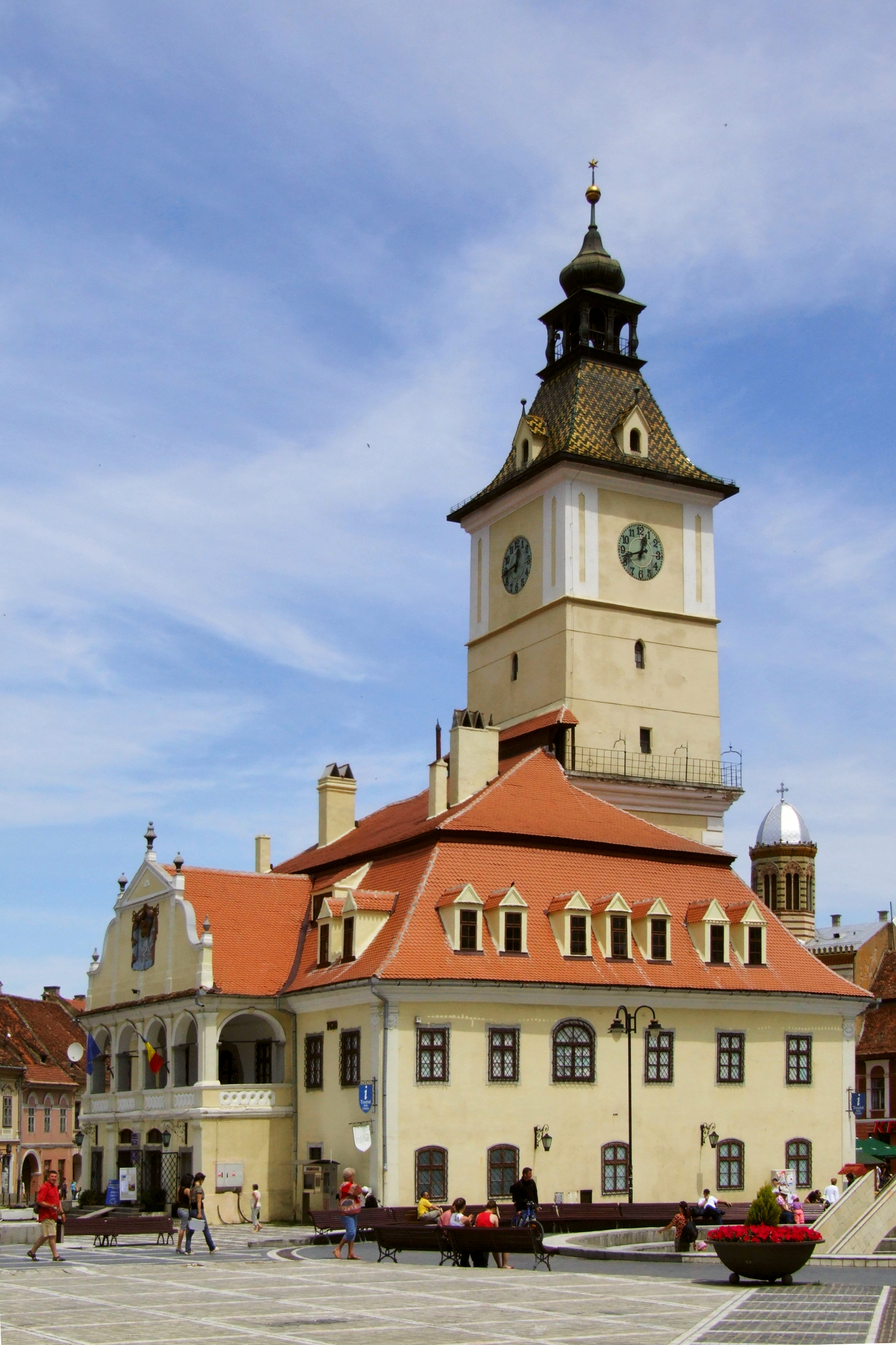
- The Council House building that houses the museum

- Location within Romania
- Established: 1950
- Location: Piața Sfatului, Brașov; Romania
- Coordinates: 45.64238°N 25.58893°E
- Type: History museum
- Collection size: 3,334 objects
- Director: Nicolae Pepene
- Website: brasovistorie.ro

The Brașov County Museum of History (Romanian: Muzeul Județean de Istorie Brașov) is a history museum in Brașov, Romania.

The museum, founded in 1950, is housed in the former Council House at the centre of Piața Sfatului, the main historic square of the city.

== See also ==
- Museum of Urban Civilization
- Black Church
