= Harry Page =

British accountant (1911–1985)

Sir Harry Page (1911–1985) was a British accountant. He served as president of the Chartered Institute of Public Finance and Accountancy (CIPFA) (1968) and city treasurer of Manchester City Council (1957–1971).

He retired to the country in 1978 and died in his home in 1985.

== Career ==
In 1973 Page was appointed chairman of a UK Government committee to review National Savings and Investments initiated by the then Labour chancellor, Denis Healey.

He was a Simon Research Fellow at the University of Manchester and a consultant on local authority finance.

Page compiled a collection of 276 bound albums and commonplace books dating between 1752 and 1935, emanating from families based in the North West of England.

Now named the 'Sir Harry Page Collection of Victorian Scrapbooks, Albums and Commonplace Books', it was purchased by Manchester Metropolitan University (MMU) in 1987.

== Recognition ==
In 1968, CIPFA named an award in his honour – the Sir Harry Page Merit Award, presented annually since 1969.
