= Gundelsheim, Baden-Württemberg =

Gundelsheim
- Town
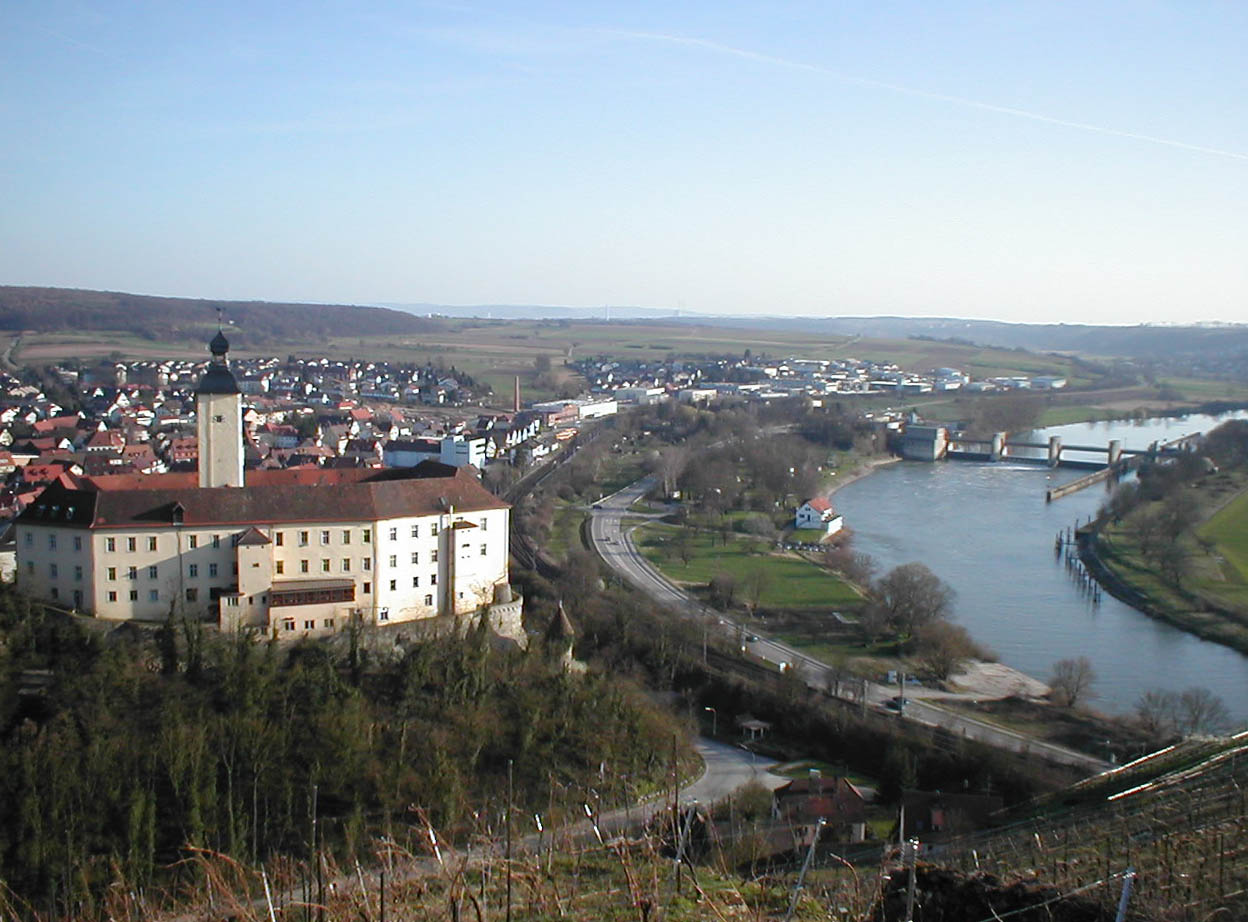
- View from Michaelsberg

- Coat of arms

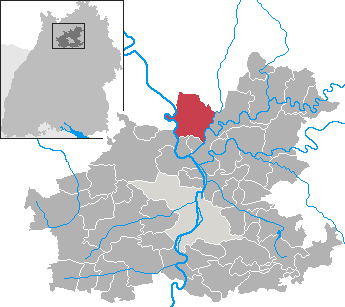
- Location of Gundelsheim within Heilbronn district
- Interactive map of Gundelsheim
- Location within Germany Location within Baden-Württemberg
- Coordinates: 49°17′N 9°10′E
- Country: Germany
- State: Baden-Württemberg
- Admin. region: Stuttgart
- District: Heilbronn
- Subdivisions: 7

Government
  - Mayor (2023–31): Heike Schokatz

Area
  - Total: 38.44 km^{2} (14.84 sq mi)
- Elevation: 154 m (505 ft)

Population (2025-12-31)
  - Total: 7,313
  - Density: 190.2/km^{2} (492.7/sq mi)
- Time zone: UTC+01:00 (CET)
  - Summer (DST): UTC+02:00 (CEST)
- Postal codes: 74831
- Dialling codes: 06269, 06265 (Bernbrunn), 07136 (Höchstberg, Obergriesheim)
- Vehicle registration: HN
- Website: www.gundelsheim.de

Gundelsheim (German pronunciation: [ˈɡʊndl̩sˌhaɪ̯m]) is a town in the district of Heilbronn in Baden-Württemberg in southern Germany.

It is situated on the right bank of the Neckar, 17 km northwest of Heilbronn. The town centre retains its narrow mediaeval street plan, as well as much of its mediaeval timber architecture. Pickled gherkin manufacture and wine-growing are the two principal agricultural products, and the Neckarsulm-Gundelsheim Weingärtnergenossenschaft (vintner's co-operative) is reputed to be the oldest in all of Germany.

The most remarkable building in Gundelsheim is Castle Horneck, a former residence of the Teutonic order, now hosting the Transylvanian Museum.
