= Transylvanian Saxon culture =

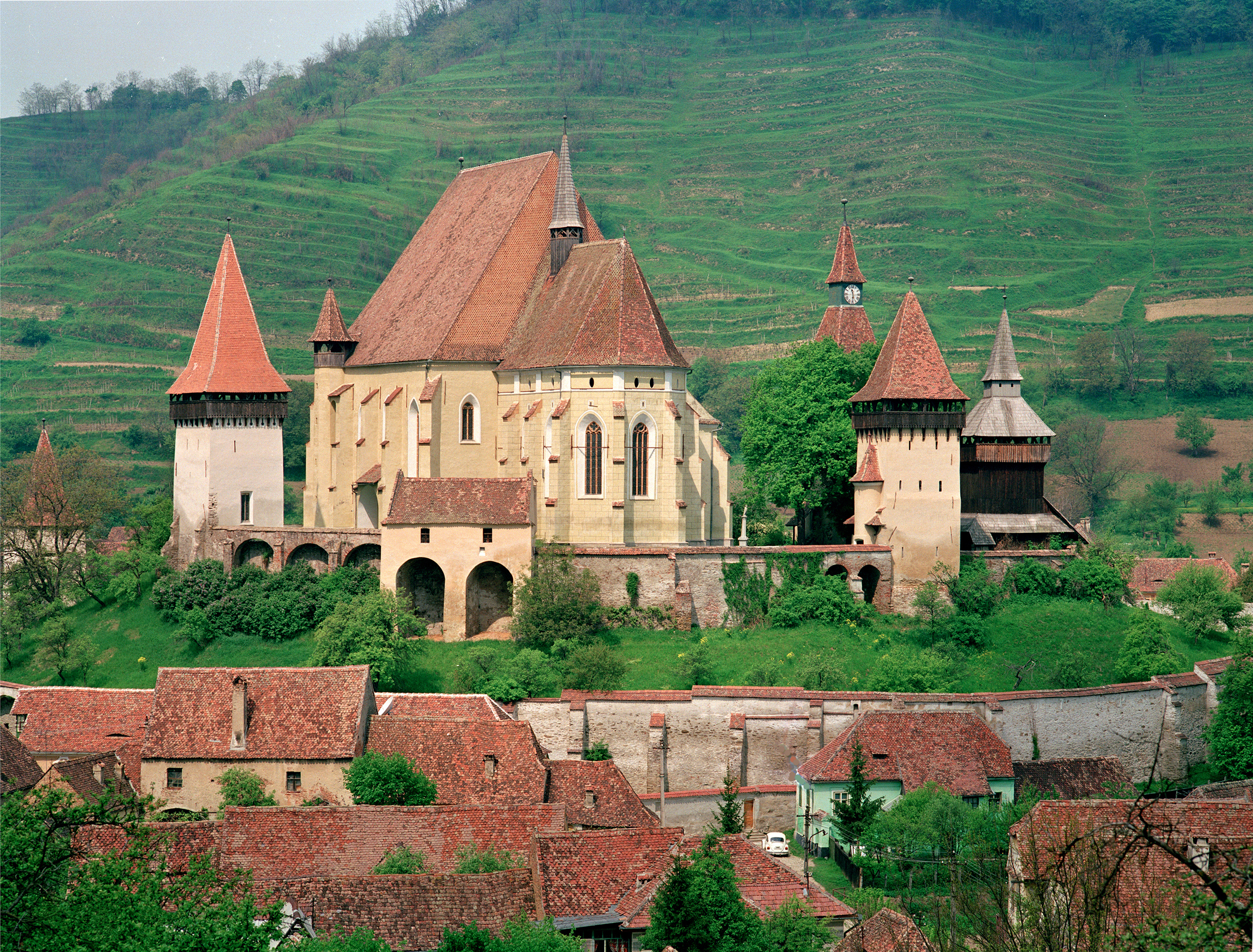
The UNESCO-recognized Evangelical Lutheran fortified church of Biertan (German: Birthälm) in Sibiu County (German: Kreis Hermannstadt) is a prominent symbol of Transylvanian Saxon culture in Transylvania, Romania and a World Heritage Site since 1993 (alongside other Saxon villages with fortified churches).

The Transylvanian Saxon culture refers to the regional culture of the Transylvanian Saxons (German: Siebenbürger Sachsen, Romanian: sași, Hungarian: erdélyi szászok), an ethnic German group (part of the Germans of Romania and one of the most significant constituent groups therein; also significantly related in particular to the Luxembourgers) which has been living in Transylvania (German: Siebenbürgen, Romanian: Transilvania), present-day central Romania since the mid and mid-late 12th century onwards, thus being one of the oldest groups of the German diaspora still residing in Eastern and Central Europe, alongside the Baltic Germans (German: Deutsch-Balten) and the Zipser Germans (German: Zipser Sachsen).

The culture of the Transylvanian Saxons is quite similar to that of the Zipser Saxons in that it can be perceived as a predominantly folk-based one, revolving around historical traditions kept from generation to generation (alongside the fact that the Zipser Saxons are their kinsmen who were settled in the former Szepes County in Upper Hungary at around the same time as they were in Transylvania during the Middle Ages, at the invitation of the Hungarian monarch).

The regional culture of the Transylvanian Saxons includes their dialect, namely Transylvanian Saxon (German: Siebenbürgisch-Sächsisch, Romanian: Dialectul săsesc) which is one of the oldest German dialects (spoken since the High Middle Ages onwards), their cuisine, their literature, their folk dances, their traditional costumes (German: Sächsische Trachten), their celebrations and cultural festivals, their traditional music, their regional anthem (i.e. Siebenbürgenlied), their history, former regional governance as the Transylvanian Saxon University (Latin: Universitas Saxonum, German: Sächsische Nationsuniversität), local architecture represented by the many villages with fortified churches (German: Kirchenburgen or Wehrkirchen), and heraldic (including their coat of arms).

== Background ==
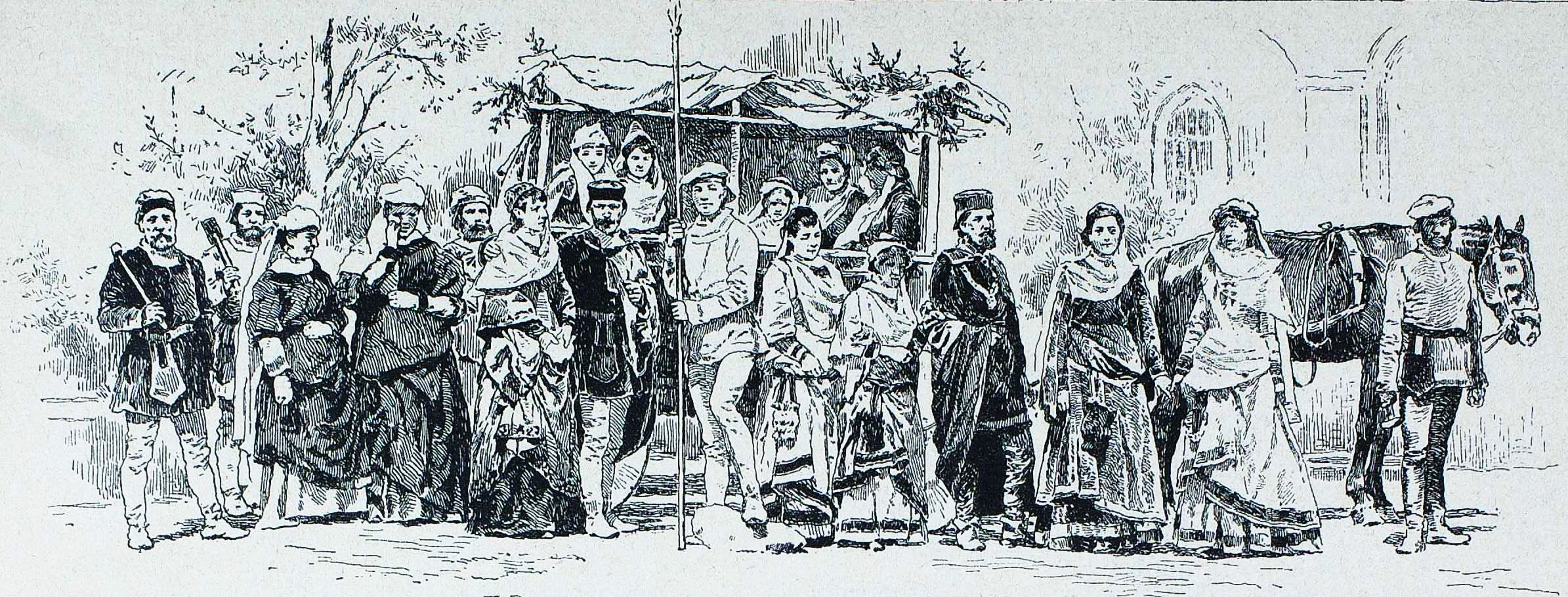
Illustration from the historical German-language newspaper 'Die Gartenlaube' (1884) depicting a group of Transylvanian Saxons during the Middle Ages.

The Transylvanian Saxons, a group of the German diaspora which started to settle in Transylvania, present-day Romania, since the high medieval Ostsiedlung, have a regional culture which can be regarded as being both part of the broader German culture as well as the Romanian culture.

Having continuously lived for centuries in a diverse cultural region, their regional culture also influenced those of the Romanians and Hungarians in Transylvania and vice-versa. The Transylvanian Saxon heritage in Romania is present in the local architecture of many Transylvanian villages, towns, and cities as well as in the Romanian cuisine, as dishes of German origin are shared between the cultures of the two peoples. The eclectic origins of the Transylvanian Saxons as a Germanic people (with roots also from Luxembourg) make their regional culture to be distinguished as Central European and Western European (given their origins from the Rhine river valley).

== Folk dances ==
Examples of Transylvanian Saxon folk dances include Königinnentanz (i.e. the queens' dance) or der Webertanz (i.e. the tailors' dance).

== Cultural festivals and celebrations ==
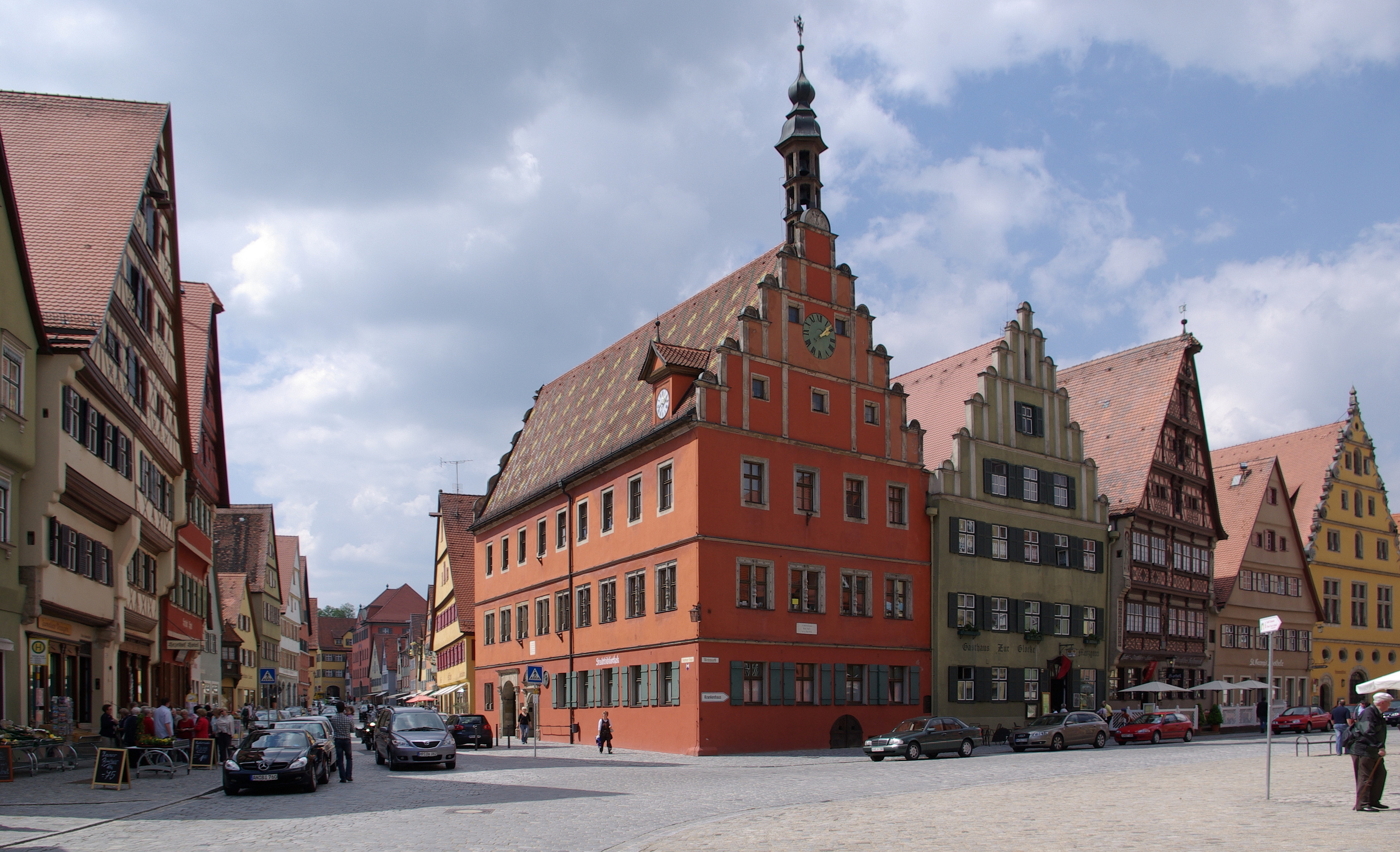
The annual gathering of Transylvanian Saxons is held in Dinkelsbühl, Bavaria, southern Germany in May.

Haferland is the name of the Transylvanian Saxon cultural festival which unfolds over a period of time of one week. The festival has been attended by both Romanians and foreign tourists as well. Another noteworthy historical Transylvanian Saxon festival is the Crown Festival (German: Kronenfest). There is also the annual gathering (or Pentecost; German: Heimattag) of the Transylvanian Saxons held in the small Bavarian town of Dinkelsbühl in southern Germany. The respective festival is held annually in May.

== Visual arts ==
In terms of visual arts, the Transylvanian Saxons have excelled at painting through the works of the following artistic representatives: Friedrich Miess, Fritz Schullerus, Trude Schullerus, Arthur Coulin, or Edith Soterius von Sachsenheim, the latter whom also emigrated to England.

== Religion ==
Religion has been a very important part of the Transylvanian Saxon culture throughout the passing of time. In the distant past, more specifically during the High Middle Ages until the Reformation, the Transylvanian Saxons were Roman Catholic. After the Reformation, the vast majority of the Transylvanian Saxons became Lutherans through a peaceful collective conversion. Nowadays, the small Transylvanian Saxon community still left in Romania is religiously represented by the Evangelical Church of the Augsburg Confession in Romania (German: Evangelische Kirche A.B. [Augsburgischen Bekenntnisses] in Rumänien).

== Contributions to Romanian culture ==
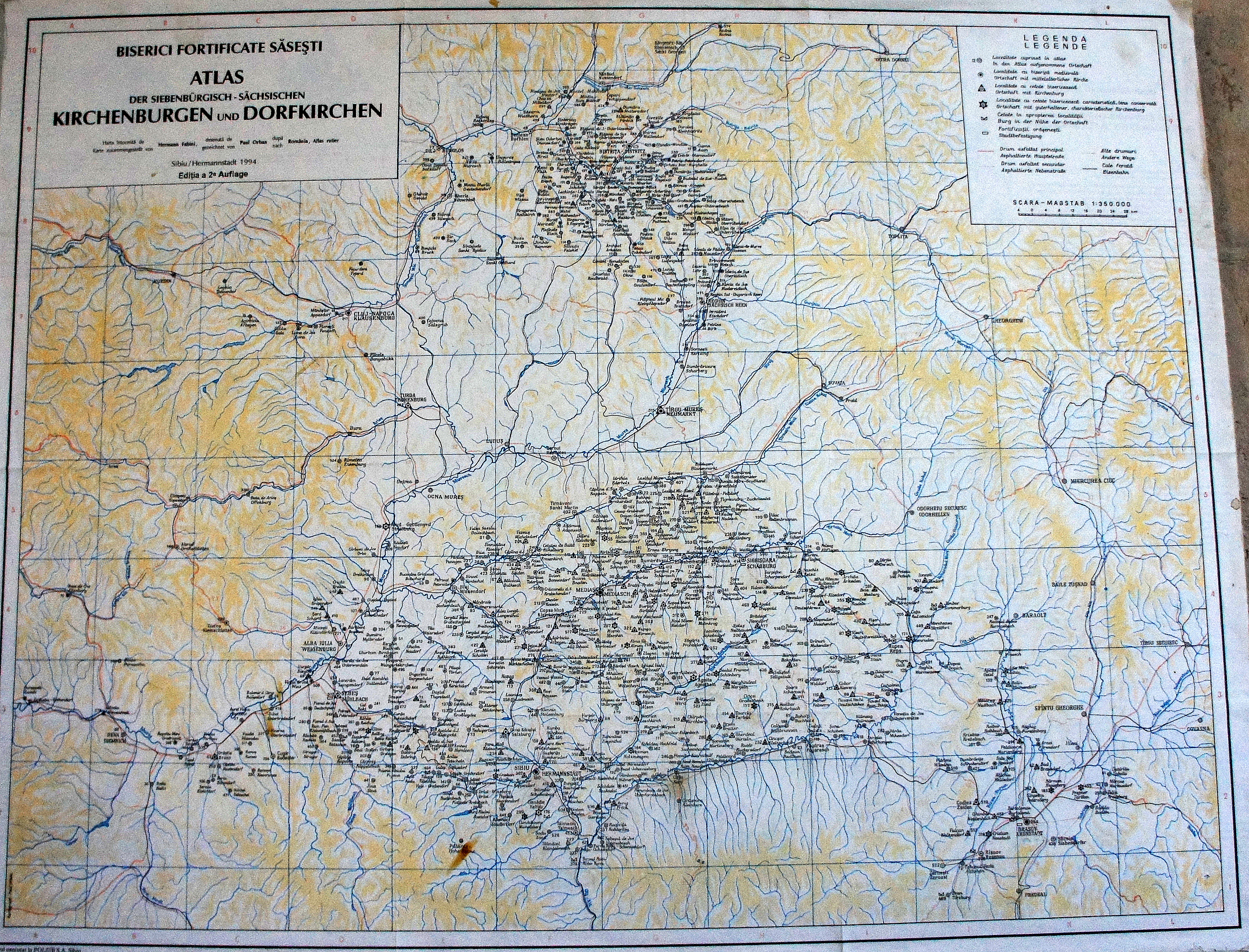
Map depicting Transylvanian Saxon fortified churches across Transylvania.

The Transylvanian Saxons also contributed significantly to the Romanian culture through their historical heritage and the century-long cohabitation with the Romanians in southern, south-eastern, and north-eastern Transylvania. Their heritage in these areas of Transylvania is best represented by the rural fortified settlements which are UNESCO-recognized World Heritage Sites. It is estimated that there have been c. 300 (or even more than 300 according to a particular estimate) such fortified settlements known as kirchenburgen (or fortress church) in German. Nevertheless, nowadays the number of those which haven't yet fallen into ruin is significantly lower, estimated at 150–200.

The contributions of the Transylvanian Saxons to the Romanian culture also include a significant number of loanwords from German to Romanian, most notably denoting professional titles or tools (see also Romanian terms derived from German on Wiktionary). In the Romanian lexis, there is also a significant influence stemming from Austrian High German (German: Österreichisches Hochdeutsch).

== Contributions to humanity ==
The Transylvanian Saxons also made noteworthy contributions to humanity in the field of science and technology by pioneering spacecraft propulsion through the works of engineers Conrad Haas and Hermann Oberth.

== Gallery ==
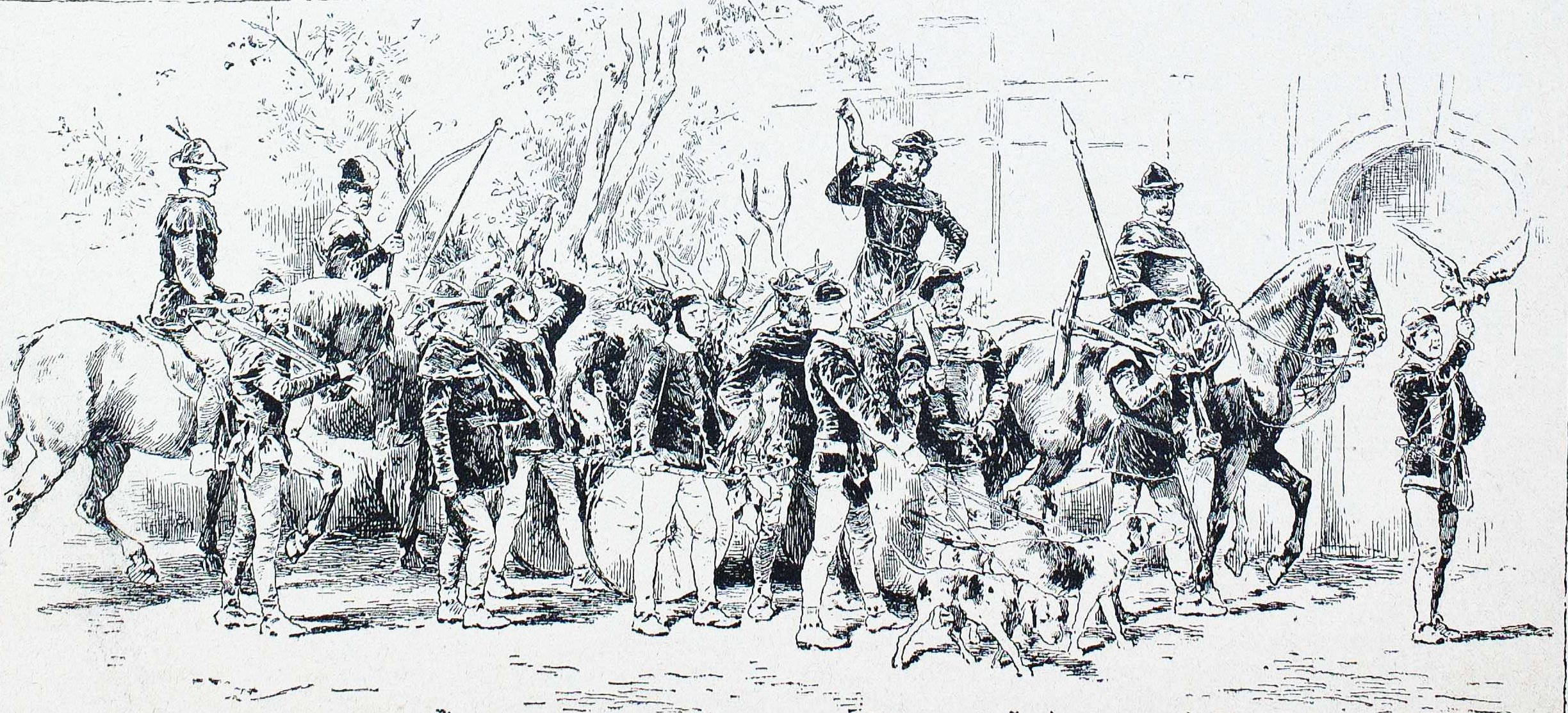
Transylvanian Saxon medieval guardsmen, illustration from 'Die Gartenlaube' (1884)

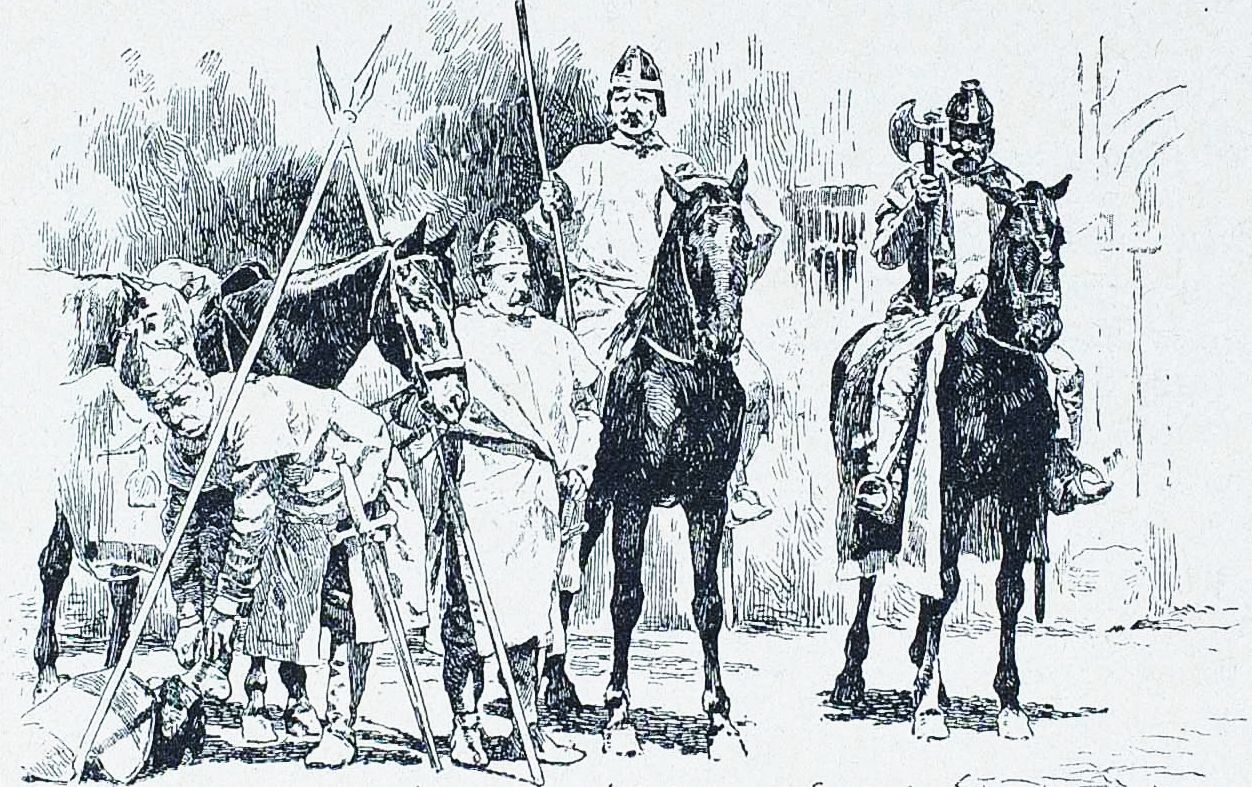
Transylvanian Saxon medieval guardsmen, illustration from 'Die Gartenlaube' (1884)

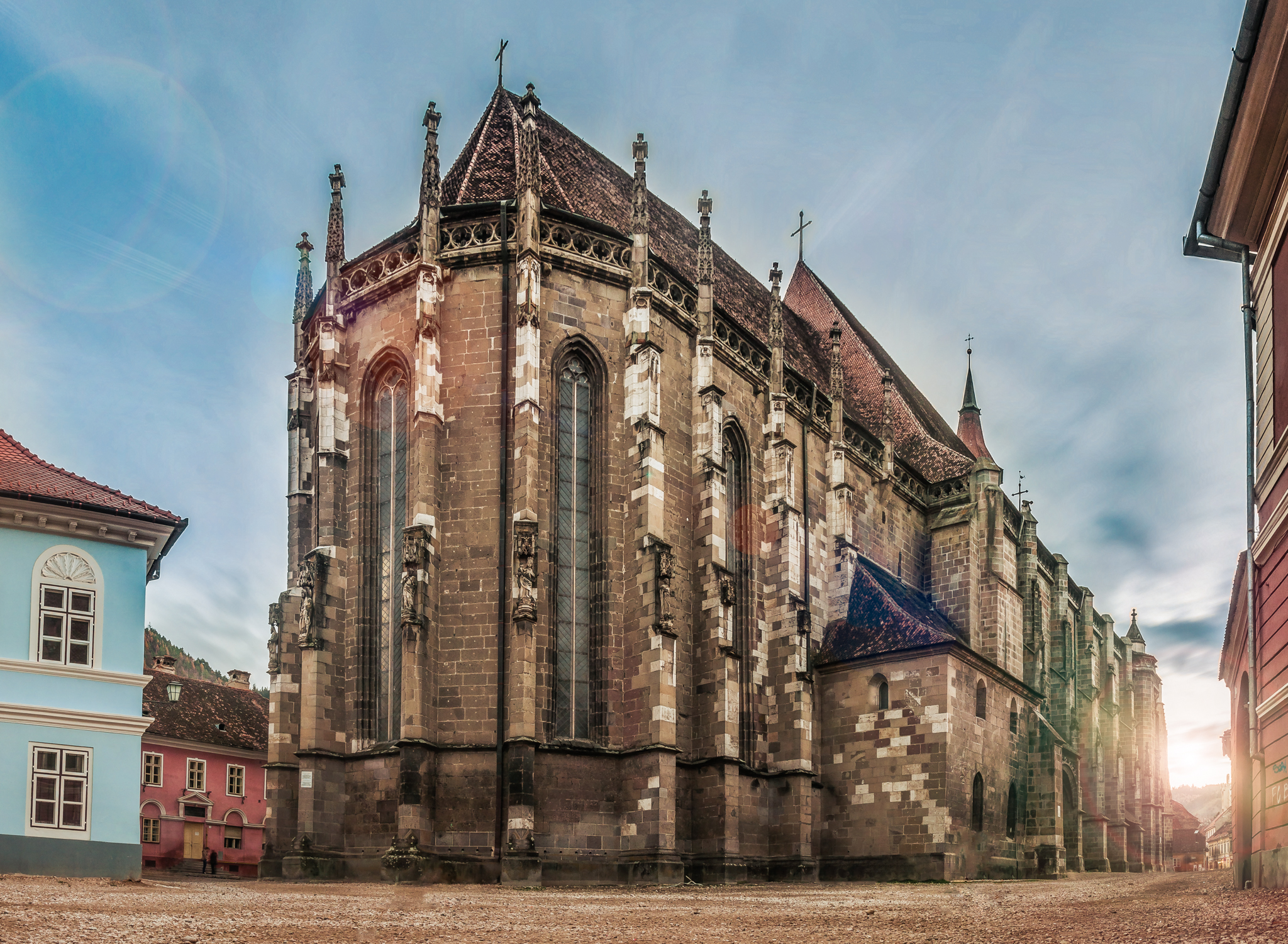
The Black Church (German: Die Schwarze Kirche) in Brașov (German: Kronstadt)

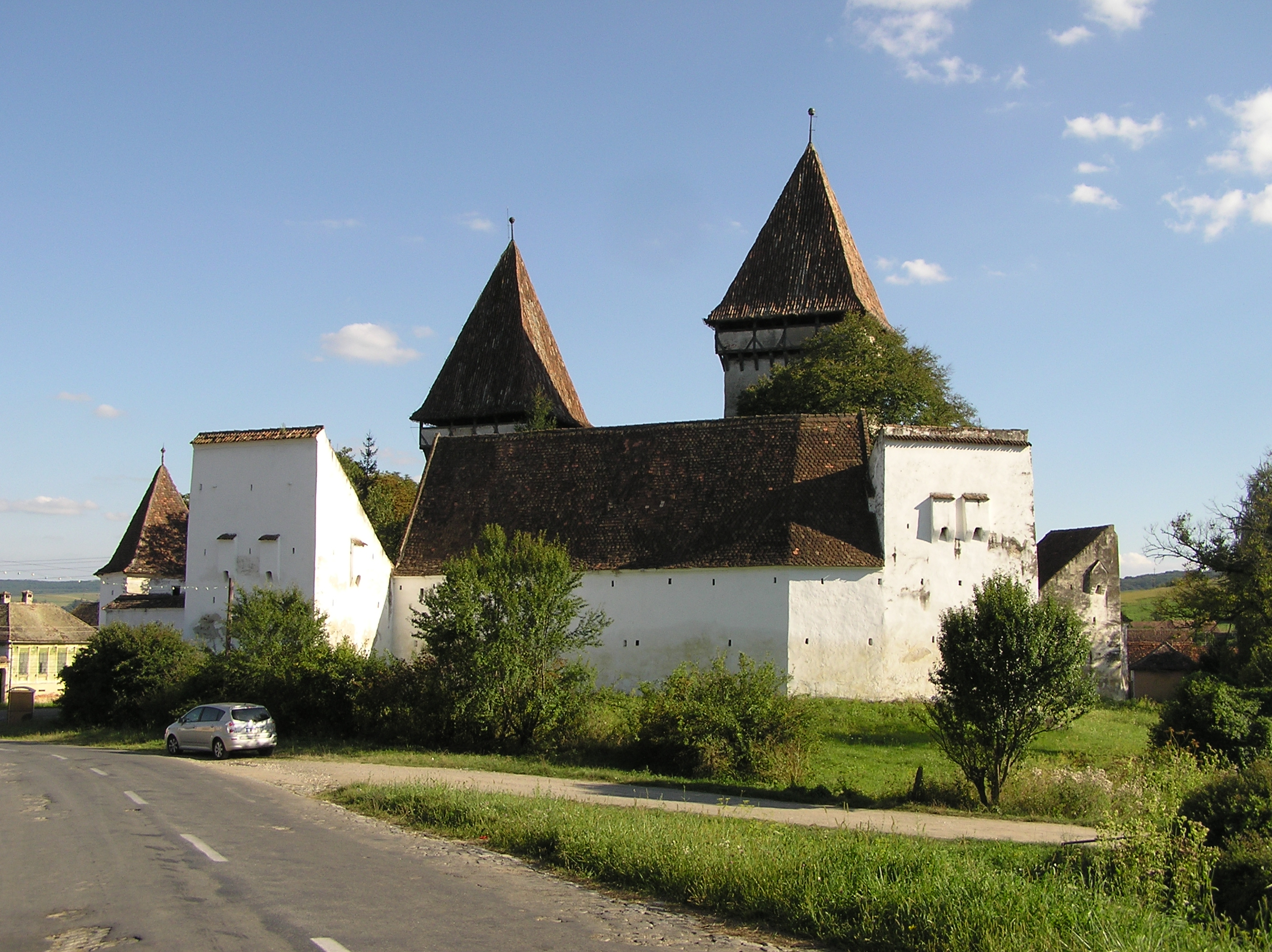
Evangelical Lutheran fortified church at Dealu Frumos (German: Schönberg), Merghindeal (German: Mergeln), Sibiu County of the local Transylvanian Saxon community

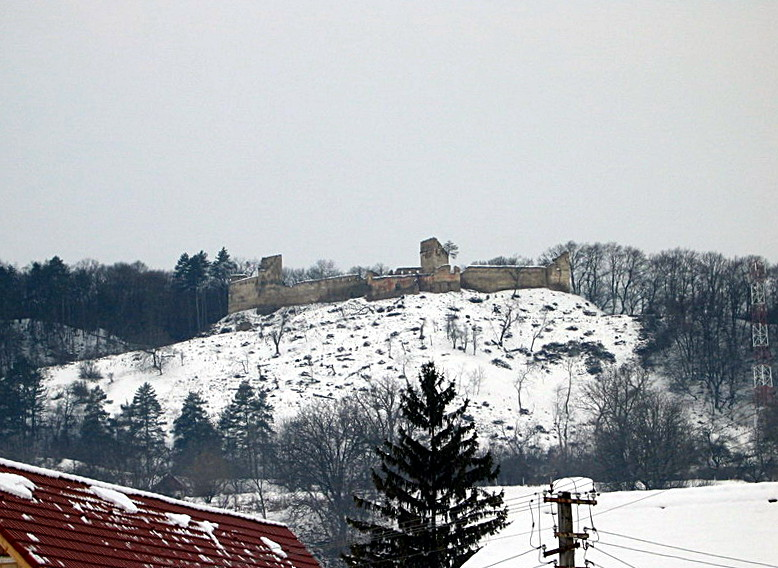
Fortified pesant citadel of Saschiz (German: Keisd or Hünenburg)

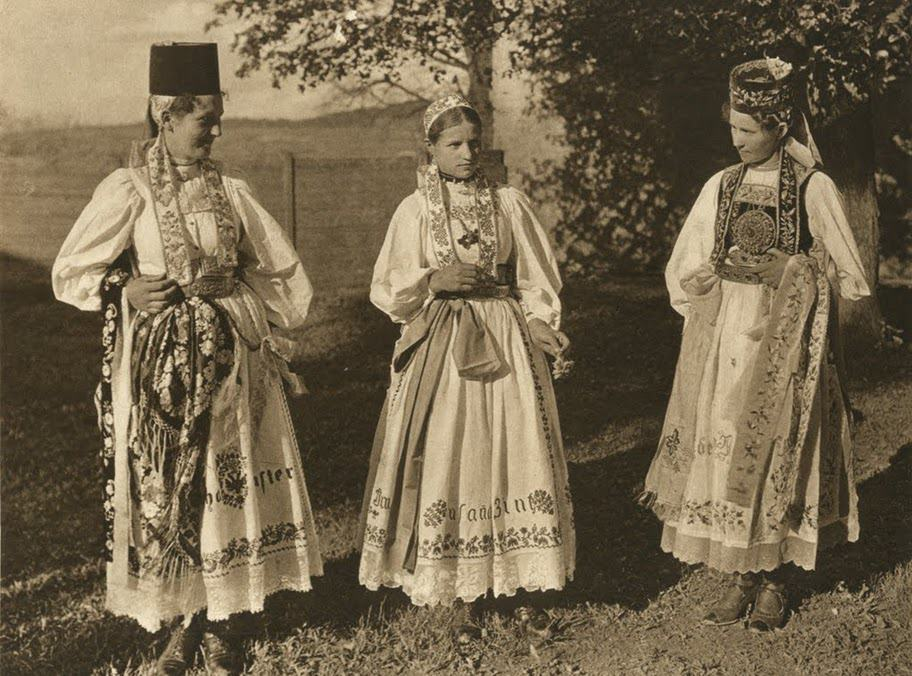
Transylvanian Saxon women from Roșia (German: Rothberg) in traditional costumes (German: Sächsische Trachten)

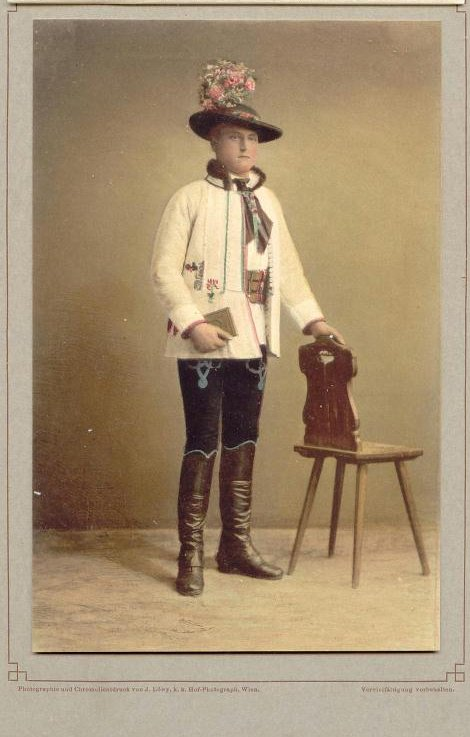
Transylvanian Saxon man in traditional costume (coloured photograph)

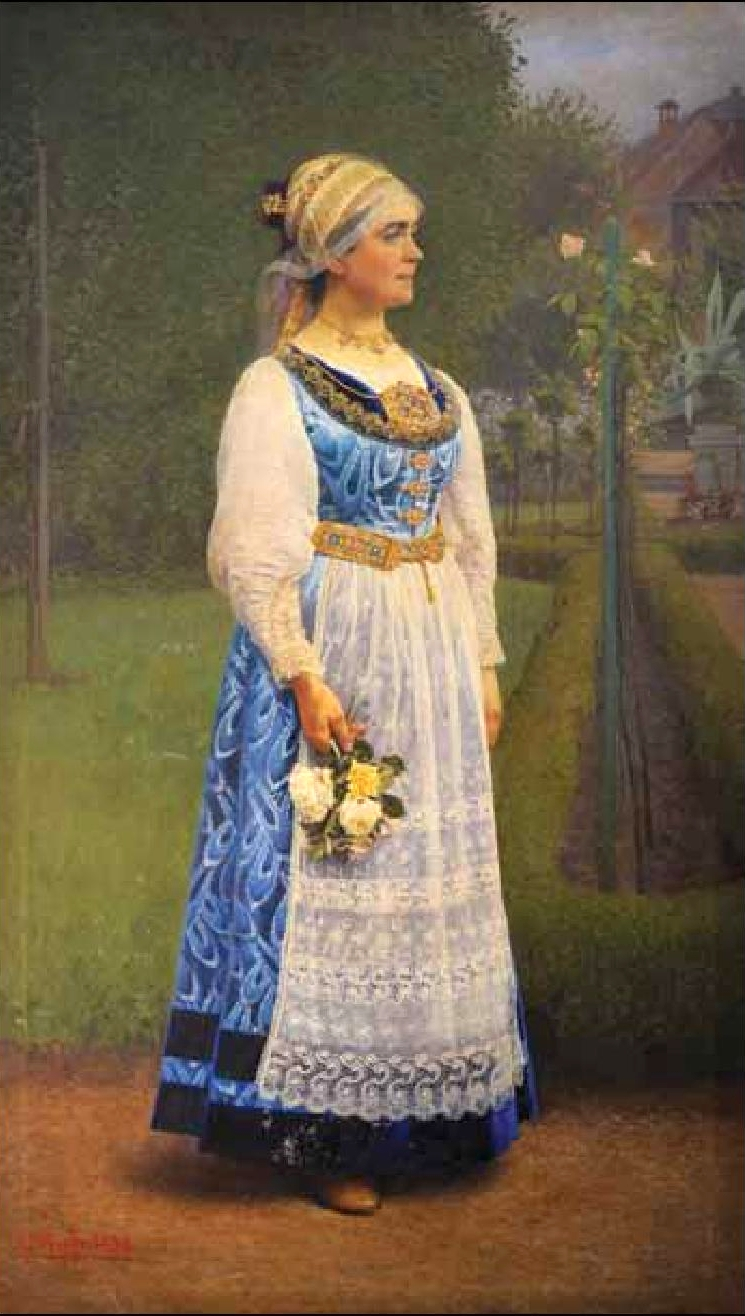
Transylvanian Saxon woman in traditional costume, portrait by Transylvanian Saxon painter Friedrich Miess

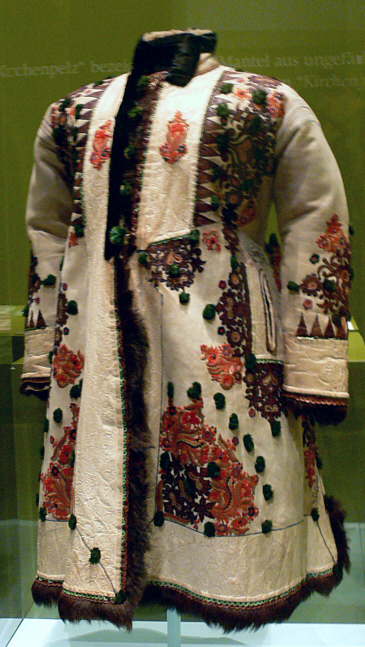
Type of traditional or folk Transylvanian Saxon costume

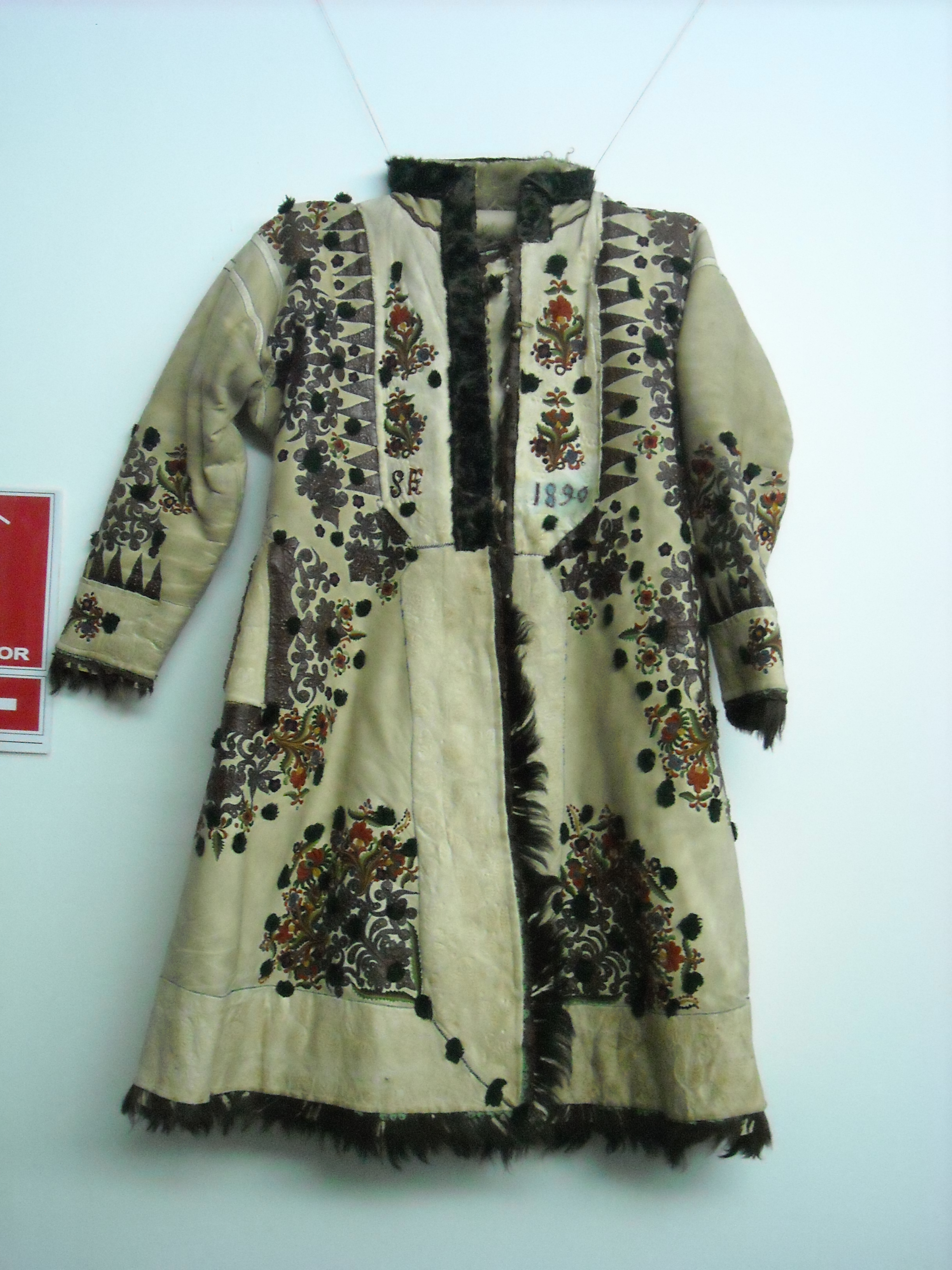
Traditional Transylvanian Saxon men's sheepskin coat from Livezile/Jaad

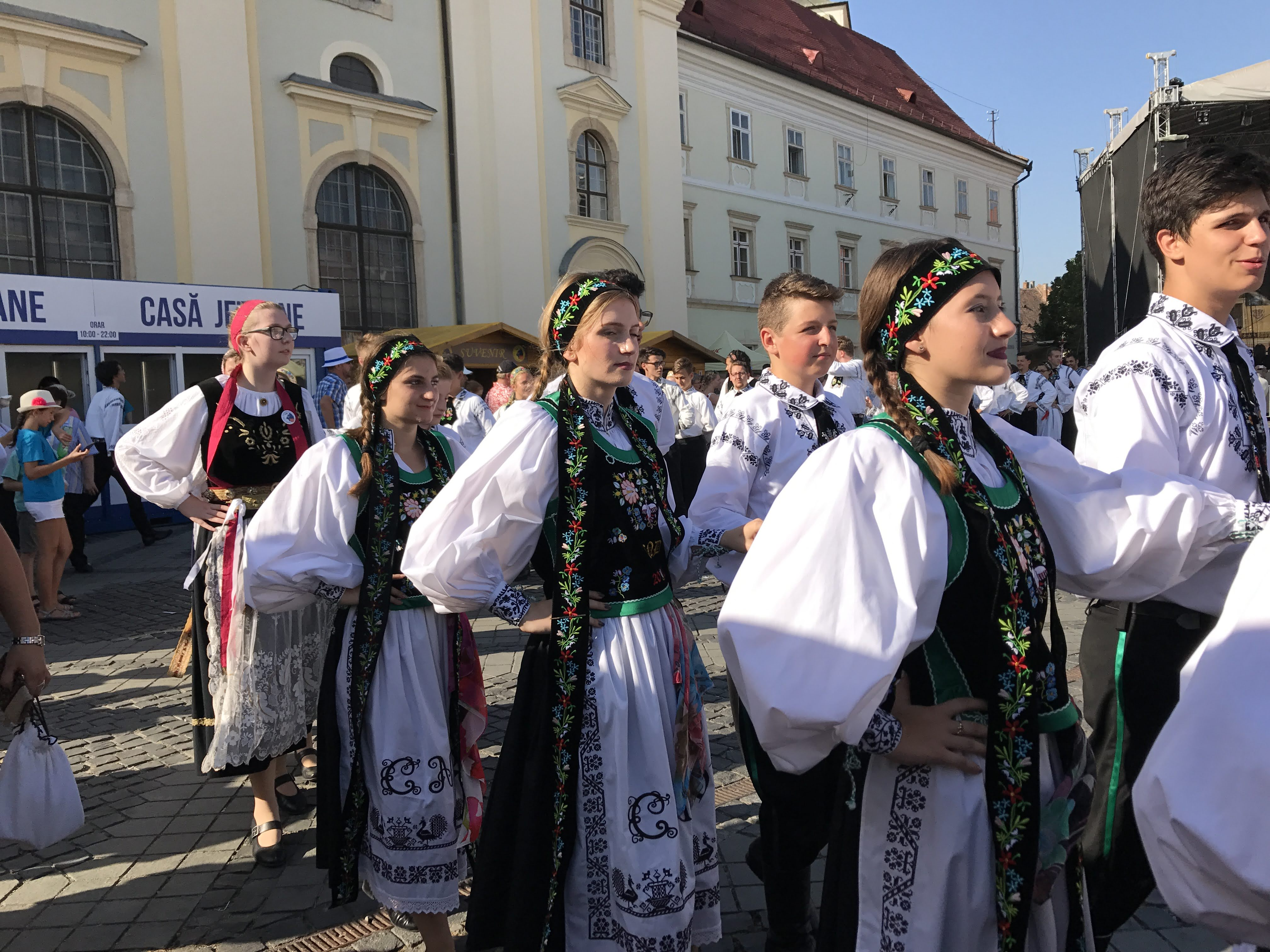
Transylvanian Saxons in traditional/folk costumes in Sibiu/Hermannstadt, Transylvania, Romania in 2017

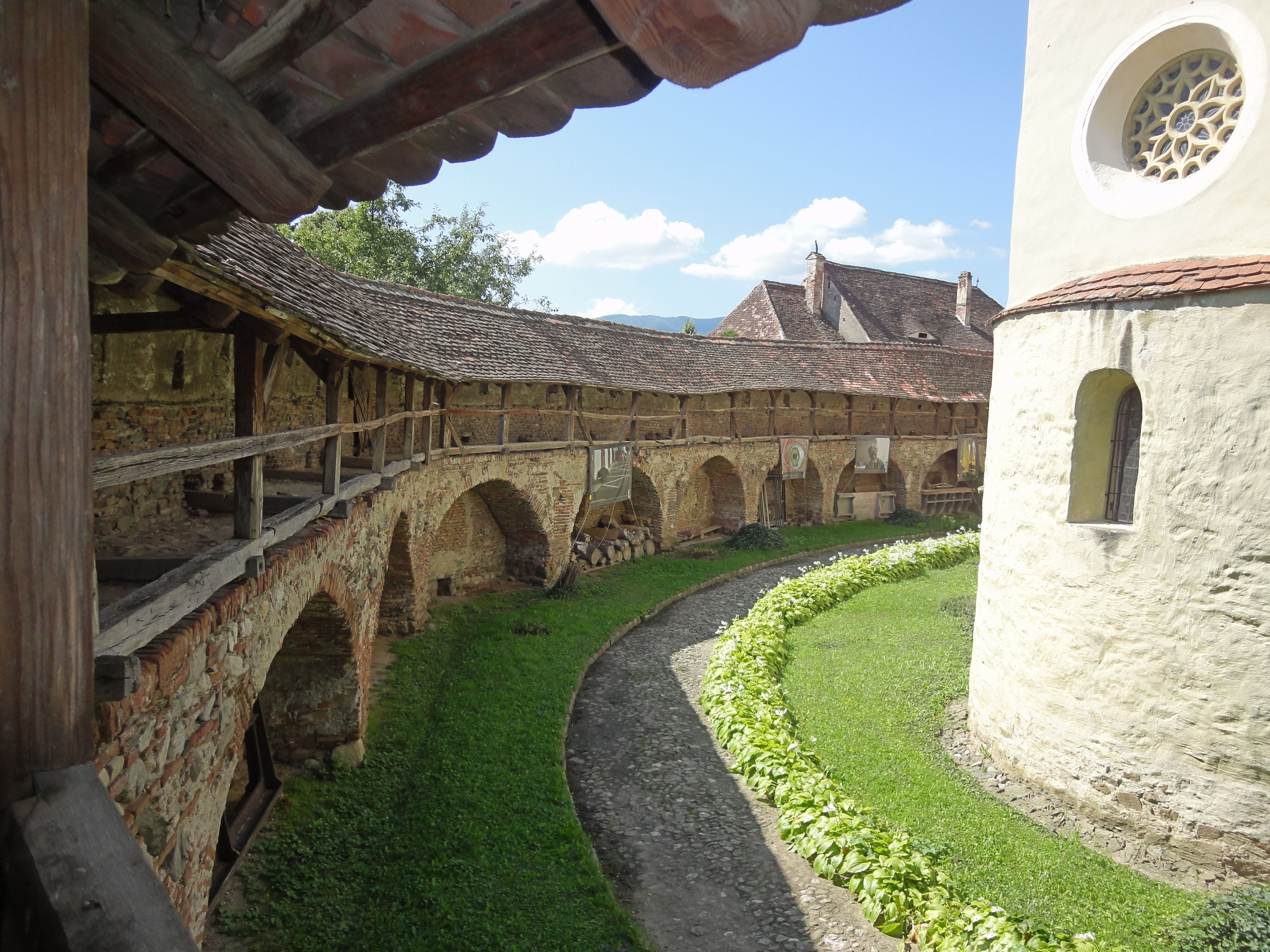
Inside the Evangelical Lutheran Transylvanian Saxon fortified church of Cisnădie (German: Heltau)

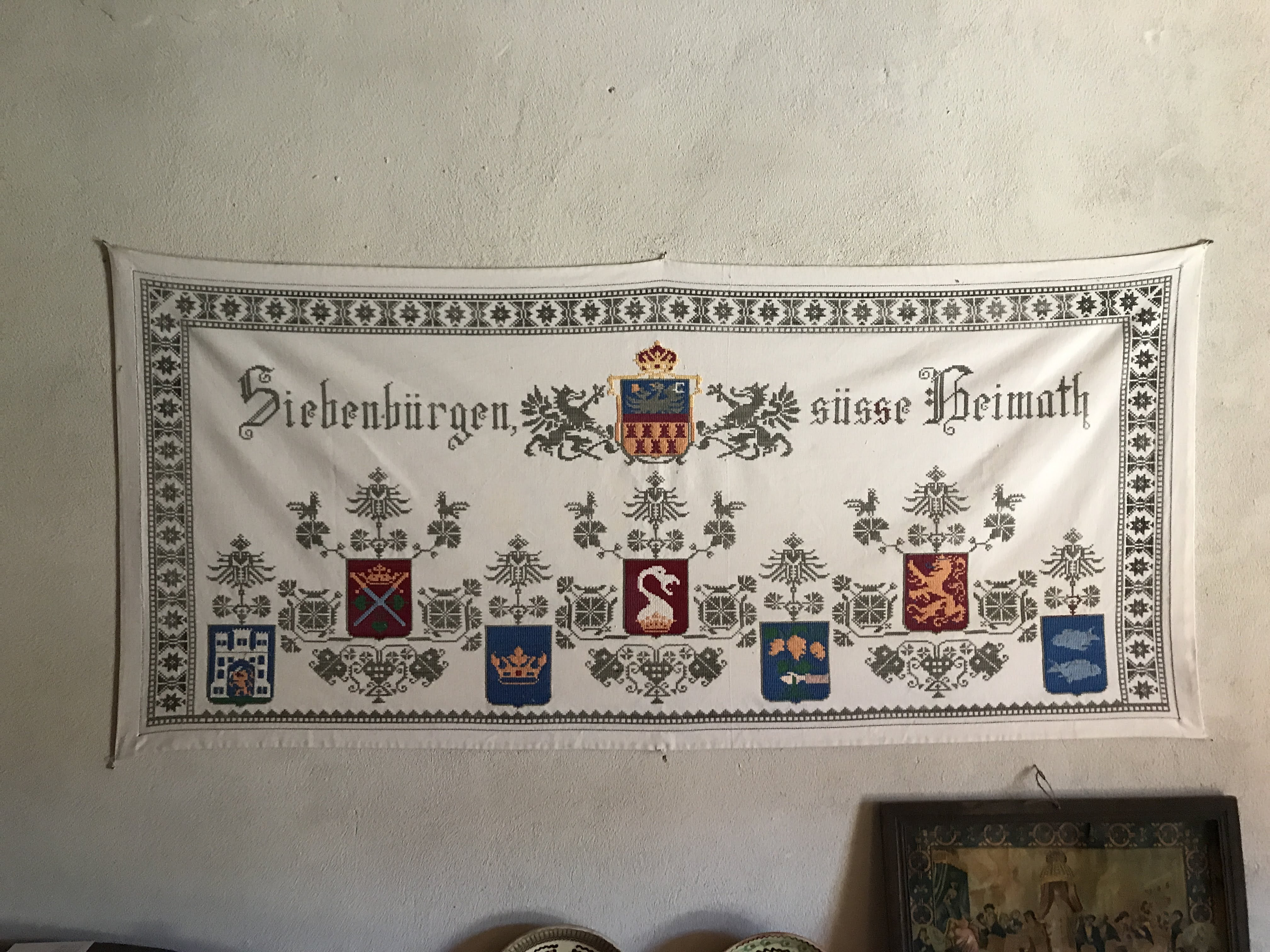
Traditional Transylvanian Saxon carpet with the German-language inscription 'Siebenbürgen süsse Heimath' (i.e. 'Transylvania sweet homeland')

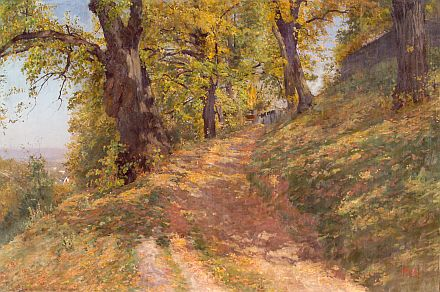
Autumn landscape by Transylvanian Saxon painter Friedrich Miess

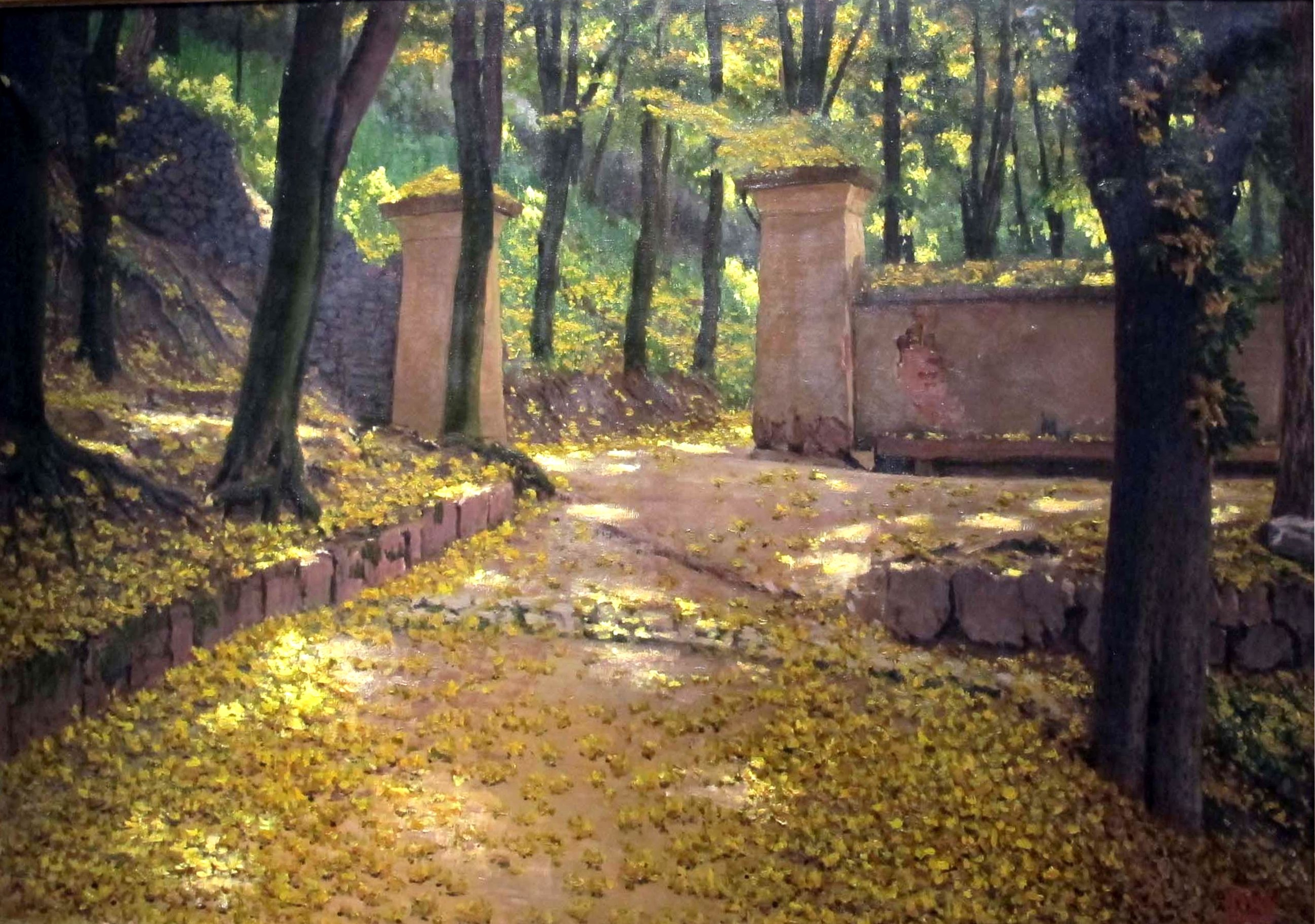
Autumn landscape by Transylvanian Saxon painter Friedrich Miess
