= Cincu =

- Commune
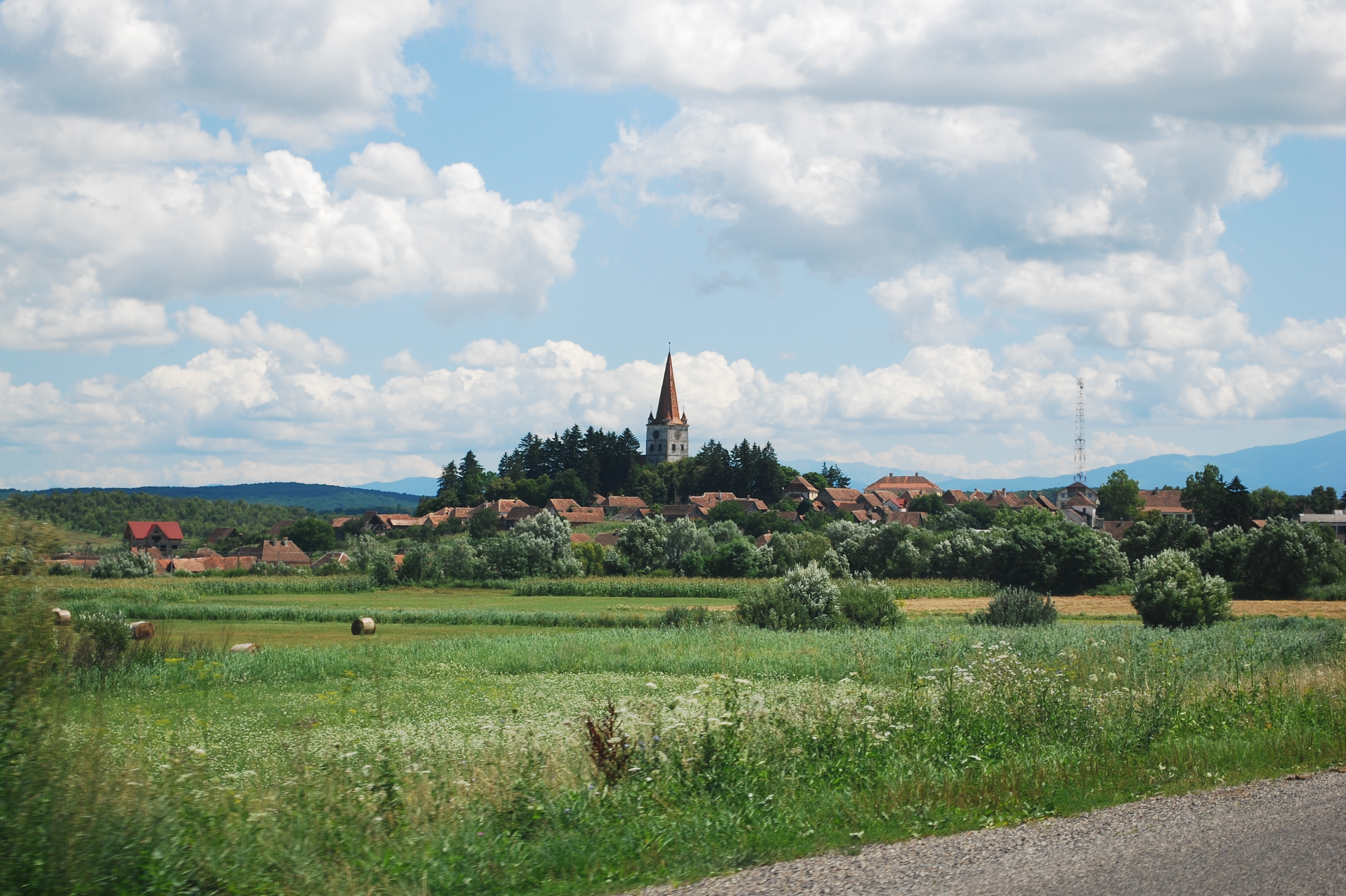

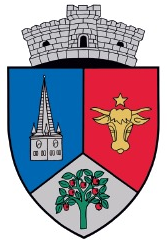
- Coat of arms

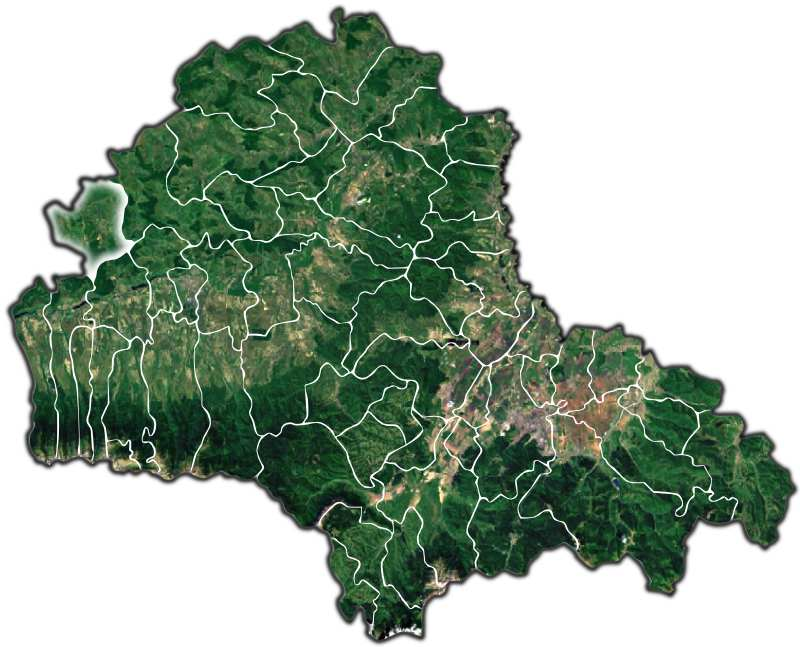
- Location within the county

- Location in Romania
- Coordinates: 45°55′N 24°48′E
- Country: Romania
- County: Brașov

Government
  - Mayor (2024–2028): Gheorghe Mirca (PSD)
- Area: 117.19 km^{2} (45.25 sq mi)
- Elevation: 474 m (1,555 ft)
- Population (2021-12-01): 1,681
  - Density: 14.34/km^{2} (37.15/sq mi)
- Time zone: UTC+02:00 (EET)
  - Summer (DST): UTC+03:00 (EEST)
- Postal code: 507045
- Area code: +40 x59
- Vehicle reg.: BV
- Website: comunacincu.ro

Cincu (German: Großschenk; Transylvanian Saxon: Schoink; Hungarian: Nagysink) is a commune in Brașov County, Transylvania, Romania. It is composed of two villages, Cincu and Toarcla (Tarteln; Kisprázsmár). Each of these has a fortified church.

== Geography ==
The commune is located in the northwestern part of the county, on the border with Sibiu County. It lies in the southern reaches of the Transylvanian Plateau, on the banks of the rivers Cincu and Pârâul Nou, both right tributaries of the river Olt. The nearest city is Făgăraș, some 21 km (13 mi) away; the county capital, Brașov, is 87 km (54 mi) to the southeast, while the city of Sibiu is 77 km (48 mi) to the west.

The commune is crossed by county road DJ105, which runs from nearby Voila to Agnita, 20 km (12 mi) to the northwest, and DJ105A, which runs from nearby Bruiu to Rupea, 55 km (34 mi) to the northeast.

== History ==
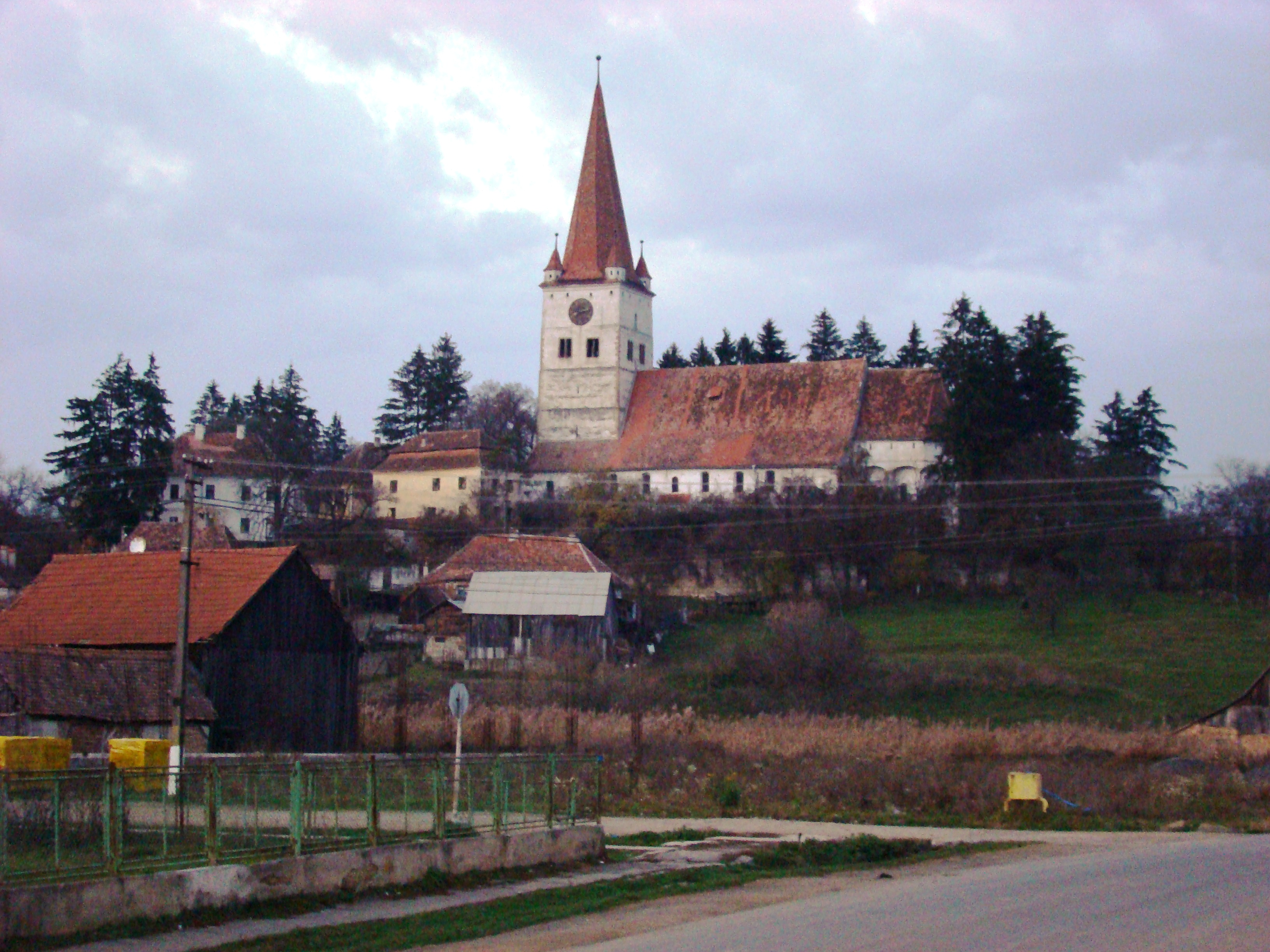
Medieval Evangelical Lutheran Transylvanian Saxon Cincu fortified church

Cincu was first mentioned in a document of 1329 as Schenck, a word connected to Schenke, meaning "tavern" in German. The village was founded in the mid-12th century by some 30 families of German settlers from the Rhineland area in present-day Germany. There were 64 families in 1488, 70 in 1532, and 344 in 1729. Some 215 individuals were settled there by the Habsburgs in 1753. In 1850, there were 2,635 inhabitants. In 1930, there were 2,449, of whom 1,112 were Transylvanian Saxons. In 1956, the population stood at 2,232.

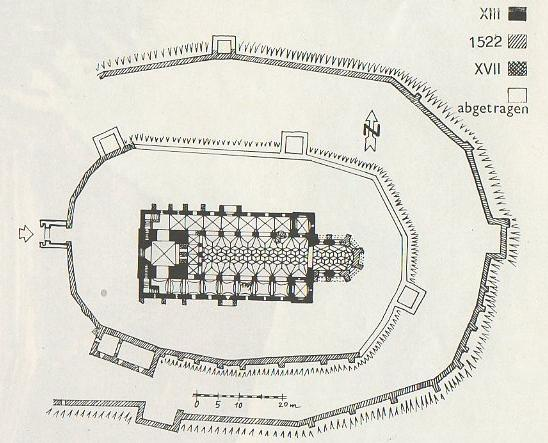
Sketch depicting the plan of the medieval Evangelical Lutheran Transylvanian Saxon fortified church in Cincu.

The Saxons' territory was divided into "seats"; among the oldest was the Schenk Seat, with its capital at Cincu. It included 22 localities, among them the current town of Agnita. Cincu has had its own coat of arms since 1448 and was declared a market town in 1474.

In 1600, its citadel was burned by the troops of Michael the Brave. Historically, the local economy was dominated by agriculture and by craft production organized into guilds for joiners, furriers, harness makers, locksmiths, carpenters, tailors, blacksmiths, cobblers, coopers, wheelwrights, and bricklayers.

The town hall was established in 1804. A significant number of inhabitants began to emigrate to the United States in the 1890s, and the Saxons started to leave en masse in the 1950s. In 1989, 386 Saxons were left; this fell to 136 in 1992, 109 in 1994, and 70 in 2000. The painter Fritz Schullerus moved to a house in Cincu in 1895, dying there three years later.

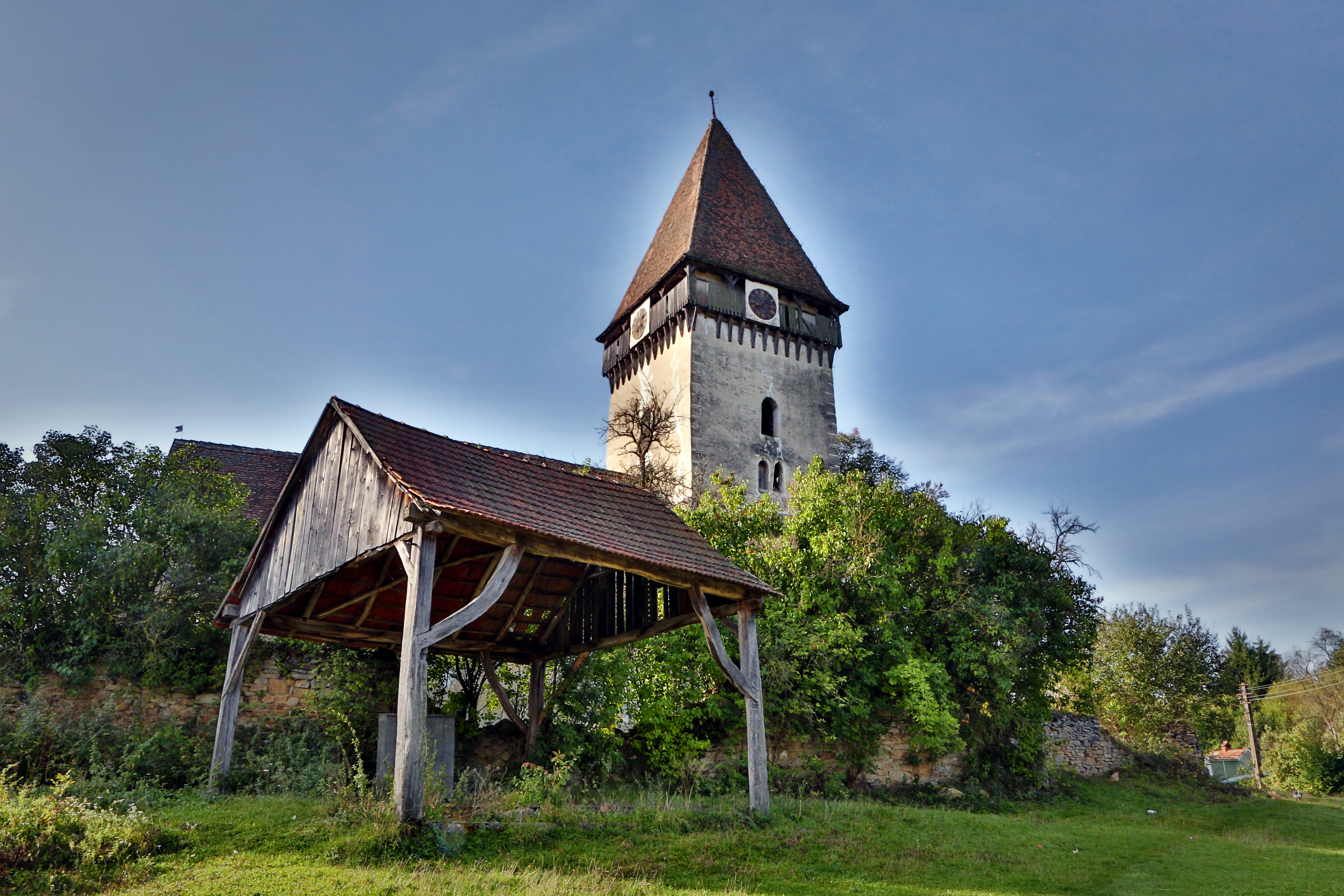
Toarcla Fortified Church

Toarcla is mentioned in Johannes Honter's cosmography text. It appears on the oldest map of Transylvania, from 1532. The Saxon population left Toarcla as well, so that there were some 20 individuals from the community left by the early 2000s.

Cincu was the seat of the Nagysink District of Nagy-Küküllő County, an administrative county (comitatus) of the Kingdom of Hungary. After World War I, as a result of the Hungarian–Romanian War and the Treaty of Trianon, the commune became part of Făgăraș County, in the Kingdom of Romania. Between 1950 and 1952, Cincu fell within the Sibiu Region of Communist Romania; it was reassigned to the Stalin Region in 1952 (renamed Brașov Region in 1960), and finally became part of Brașov County in 1968.

=== Joint Training Center ===
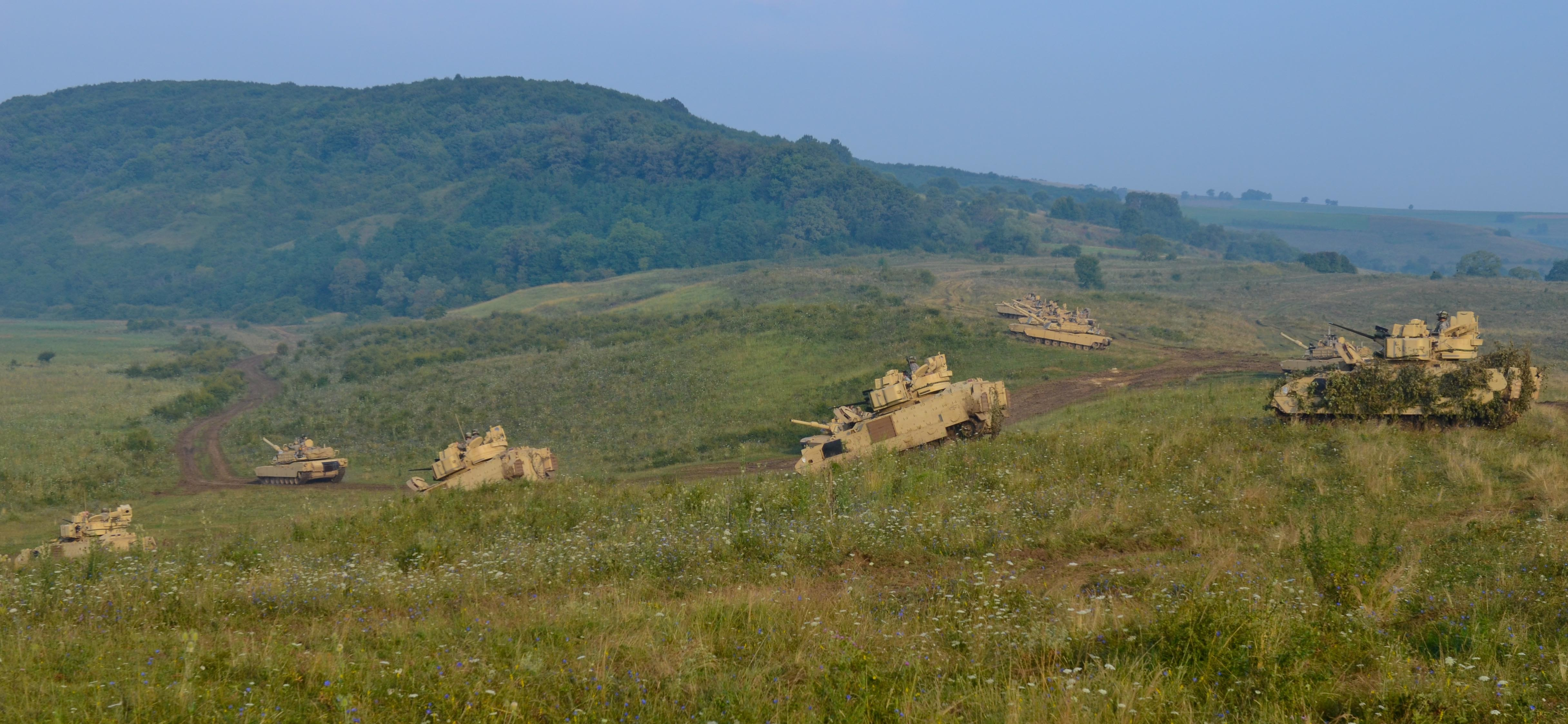
Soldiers with the 116th Cavalry Brigade Combat Team from Ontario, Oregon exercise at the Combat Training Center in Cincu, 2016

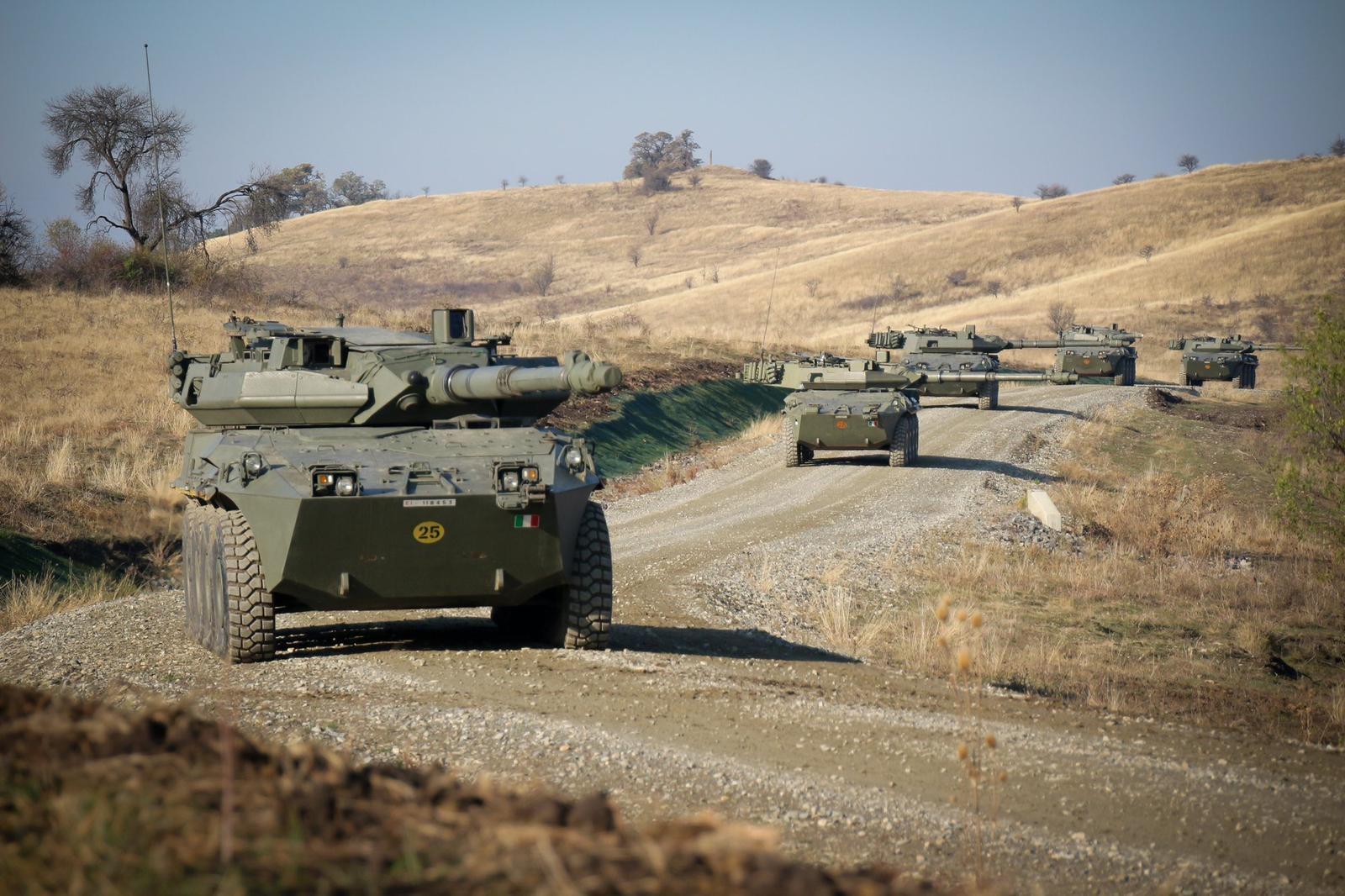
A B1 Centauro column of the Italian Army's Nizza Cavalleria regiment in Cincu, 2019

The Romanian Land Forces operate a Combat Training Center in Cincu, where NATO troops have been training as part of the NATO Enhanced Forward Presence. The facility is undergoing a massive expansion in the wake of the Russian invasion of Ukraine, as the military alliance is shifting its center of gravity from the Mihail Kogălniceanu Air Base near the Black Sea, to Cincu, near the exact geographical center of Romania.

== Demographics ==
Historical population
| Year | Pop. | ±% |
|---|---|---|
| 1850 | 3,724 | — |
| 1890 | 3,464 | −7.0% |
| 1900 | 3,423 | −1.2% |
| 1920 | 3,049 | −10.9% |
| 1930 | 3,233 | +6.0% |
| 1956 | 2,965 | −8.3% |
| 1966 | 2,824 | −4.8% |
| 1992 | 1,866 | −33.9% |
| 2002 | 1,836 | −1.6% |
| 2011 | 1,587 | −13.6% |
| 2021 | 1,681 | +5.9% |
Source: Census data

At the 2011 census, the commune had 1,587 inhabitants, of which 79.14% were ethnic Romanians, 10.84% Roma, 3.4% Hungarians, and 3.34% Germans. At the 2021 census, Cincu had a population of 1,681; of those, 78.05% were Romanians, 9.22% Roma, 2.8% Germans, and 2.2% Hungarians.

== See also ==
- Villages with fortified churches in Transylvania
