= Transylvanian Saxon University =

Governing body in the Late Middle Ages

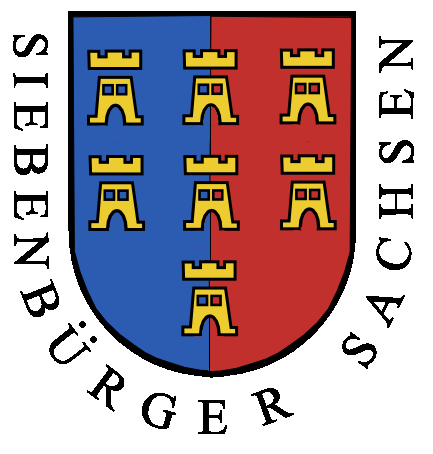
The coat of arms of the Transylvanian Saxon University

The Transylvanian Saxon University (Latin: Universitas Saxonum, German: Nationsuniversität or Sächsische Nationsuniversität, Romanian: Universitatea Națiunii Săsești, Hungarian: Szász Nemzeti Egyetem) was an official governing body of the Transylvanian Saxon community in Transylvania during the Late Middle Ages up until the late Modern Age. The Saxon University was led by the Saxon Count (Latin: Comes Saxonum, Romanian: Comesul sas or Contele sas).

The Saxon University (Romanian: Universitatea săsească) was constituted at the royal order of Hungarian King Matthias Corvinus in 1486. From 1486 up until 1876, the Saxon University worked as a self-governing (or autonomous) administrative body of the Saxon ethnicity in the Principality of Transylvania and then in the Grand Principality of Transylvania (from 1765 onwards). From 1876 up until the year of its dissolution in 1937, the Saxon University became and functioned as a foundation of the Transylvanian Saxons, thereby coordinating the activity of their schools and Evangelical Lutheran churches (i.e. subordinated to the Evangelical Church of the Augsburg Confession) in the process.

== Name ==
The name can be quite problematic at first glance given the fact that it does not refer to a university per se but it rather signifies a medieval estate of the realm based on ethnic criterion, ascribing the entire ethnicity of Transylvanian Saxons who lived in Transylvania starting with the Middle Ages, then part of the Kingdom of Hungary.

== Historical background ==
The Transylvanian Saxon University encompassed the seven seats of the Saxons (i.e. Sieben Stühle) in Transylvania (all under the high seat of Sibiu/Hermannstadt known as Hermannstädter Hauptstuhl), the later two seats of Șeica (German: Schelker Stuhl) and Mediaș (German: Mediascher Stuhl) as well as the two districts of Brașov and Bistrița, all of them previously inhabited by a significant Transylvanian Saxon population (an ethnic German group which was part of the larger Ostsiedlung process in Central and Eastern Europe) since the High Middle Ages up until the 20th century.

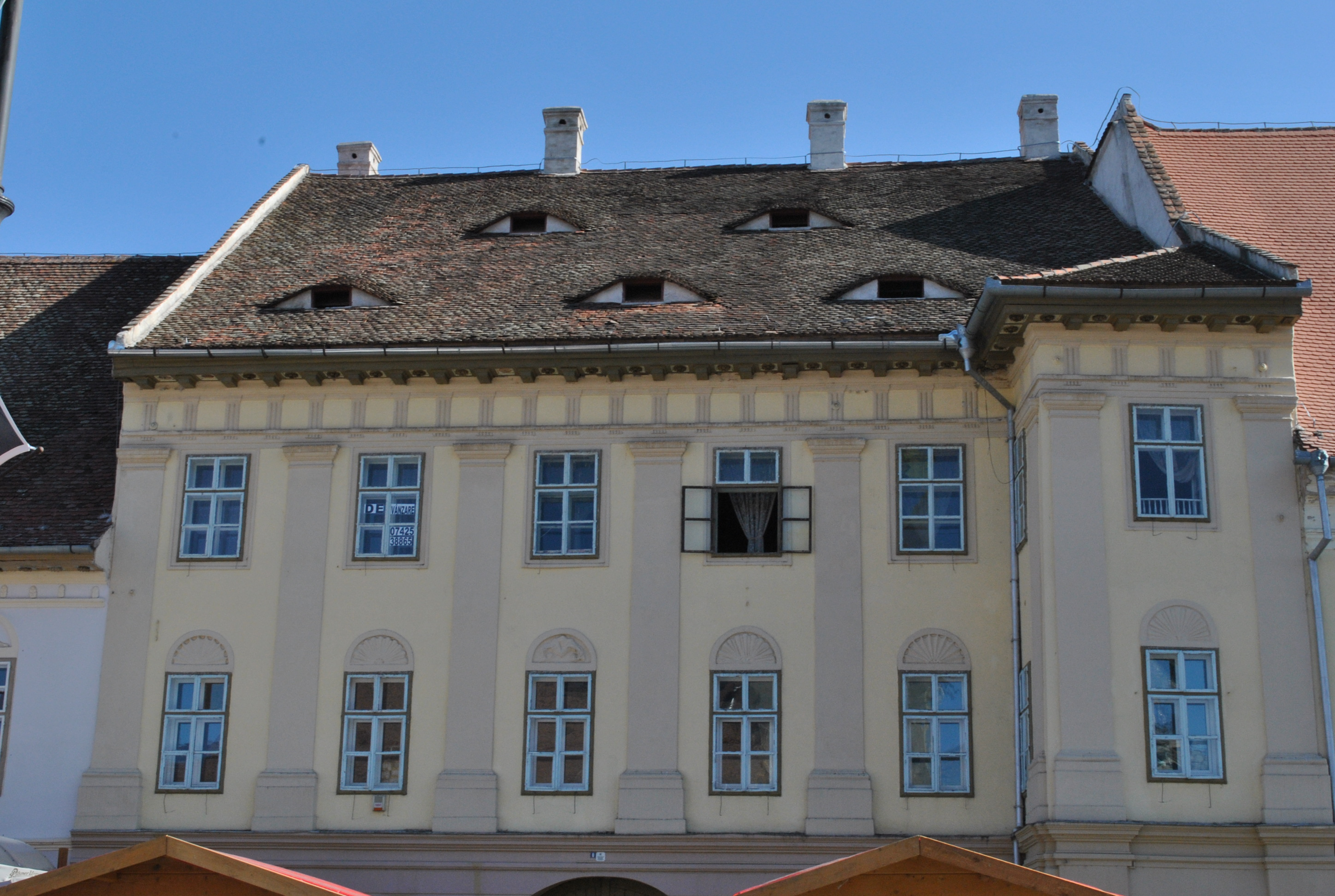
The Hecht house from Sibiu/Hermannstadt, where the Saxon University was moved in 1821.

Following its creation during medieval times, the Saxons in Transylvania became a 'political nation' alongside the Hungarians and the Szeklers in Transylvania, obtaining thus the right of political representation within the Diet of Transylvania (Romanian: Dieta Transilvaniei).

Former Sibiu/Hermannstadt mayor Thomas Altemberger received the rights of the Transylvanian Saxon University from King Matthias Corvinus (reinforcing what was previously stipulated within the Diploma Andreanum) for all Saxons living in Transylvania (i.e. universorum Saxonum nostrorum partium regni nostri Transsilvanorum). During the early part of the 19th century, more specifically in 1821, the seat of the Transylvanian Saxon University was moved to the Hecht house in Sibiu/Hermannstadt (which previously served as the town's mint house in the 15th century).

During the mid-19th century, the Transylvanian Saxon University conferred more rights to the Romanian ethnic majority in Transylvania, thereby managing to offer Romanians equal rights and status as those of the Saxons in the Saxon-administered lands across Transylvania.

== Gallery ==
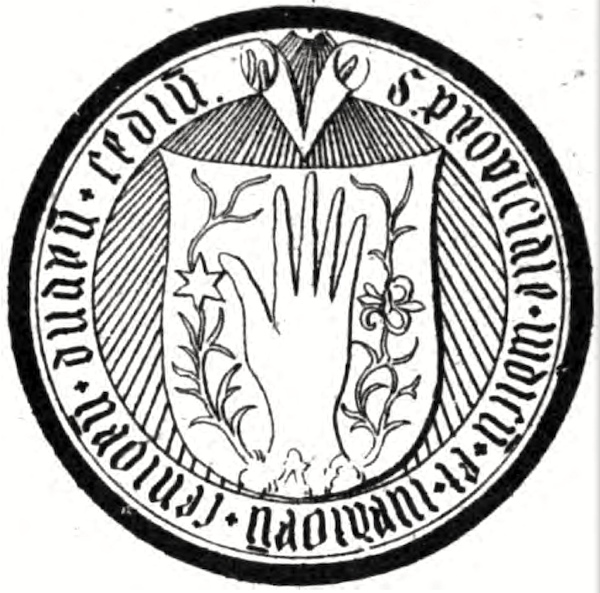
Historical seal of Zwei Stühle (i.e. Two Seats)

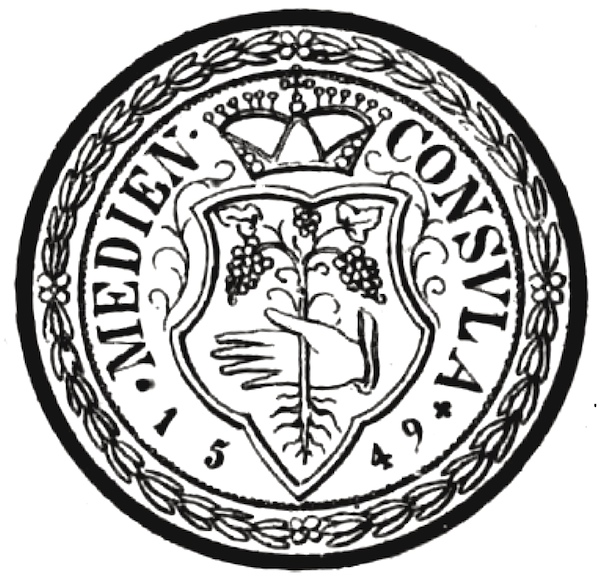
Historical seal of Mediaș (German: Mediasch)

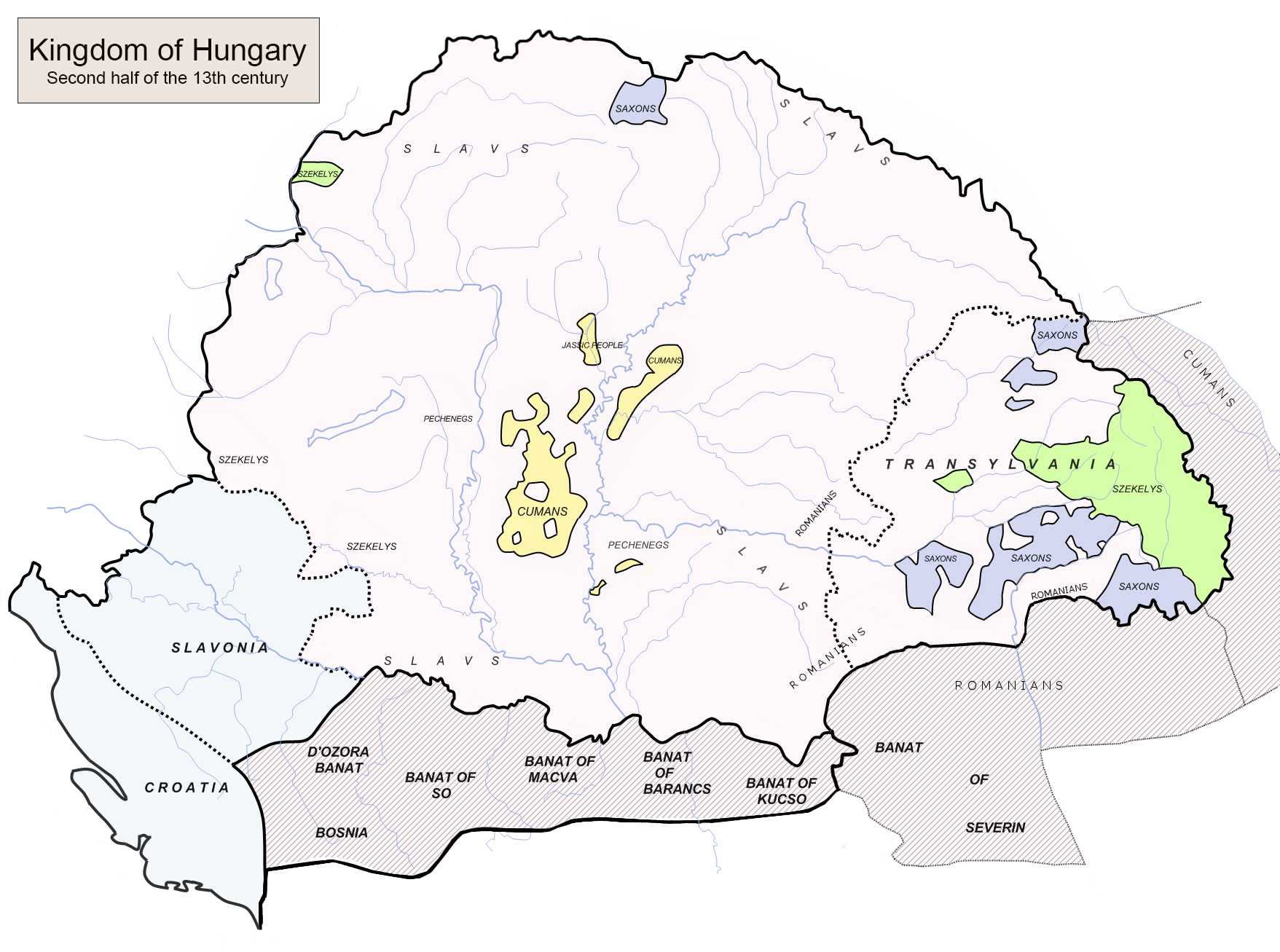
Map depicting the local autonomies in the Kingdom of Hungary during the 13th century (blue grey denotes Transylvanian Saxon autonomous medieval seats/territories). (Note: The small blue grey-coloured region to the north of the map is situated in present-day Slovakia and represents the Zips or Spiš region or the former Szepes County, where Zipser Germans or Zipser Saxons, as they are also known and sometimes referred to, were invited to settle by the Hungarian Kings throughout the passing of time during both the High and Late Middle Ages.)

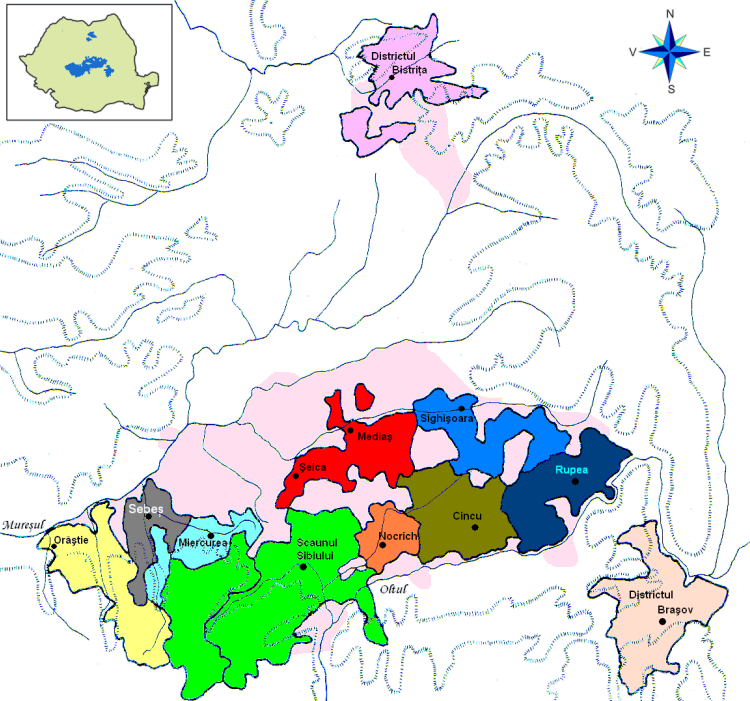
Romanian-language map depicting the total territorial extent of the Saxon lands/seats in southern, south-eastern, and north-eastern Transylvania.

Detailed and bilingual Romanian-German map depicting the Transylvanian Saxon seats and historical lands in Transylvania.

== See also ==
- Universitas Valachorum
- Eyes of Sibiu (known in Romanian as Ochii din Sibiu and in German as Augen von Hermannstadt), in connection to the architecture of the Hecht house
- Transylvanian Saxon culture
- Transylvanian Saxon literature
- Zipser Willkür, the German medieval town law (German: Deutsches Stadtrecht) of the Zipser Saxons (to whom the Transylvanian Saxons are related) in the former Szepes County, Upper Hungary, Kingdom of Hungary
