= Cincu (river) =

- Location within Romania

Location
- Country: Romania
- Counties: Brașov County
- Villages: Cincu, Cincșor

Physical characteristics
- Mouth: Olt
  - location: Voila
  - coordinates: 45.8279°N 24.8289°E
- Length: 18 km (11 mi)
- Basin size: 138 km^{2} (53 sq mi)

Basin features
- Progression: Olt→ Danube→ Black Sea
- Tributaries
  - left: Rodbav, Calbor

The Cincu is a right tributary of the river Olt in Romania. It discharges into the Olt in Cincșor. Its length is 18 km (11 mi) and its basin size is 138 km^{2} (53 sq mi).
