= Pârâul Nou =

- Location within Romania

Location
- Country: Romania
- Counties: Brașov, Sibiu
- Villages: Toarcla, Bruiu, Șomartin, Nou Român

Physical characteristics
- Mouth: Olt
  - coordinates: 45.7972°N 24.5655°E
- Length: 27 km (17 mi)
- Basin size: 244 km^{2} (94 sq mi)

Basin features
- Progression: Olt→ Danube→ Black Sea
- Tributaries
  - left: Gherdeal
  - right: Veseud, Valea lui Trifan, Săsăuș, Poienița

The Pârâul Nou (also: Șomartin) is a right tributary of the river Olt in Romania. It discharges into the Olt in Nou Român. Its length is 27 km (17 mi) and its basin size is 244 km^{2} (94 sq mi).
