= Săsăuș =

- Location within Romania

Location
- Country: Romania
- Counties: Sibiu County
- Villages: Veseud, Chirpăr, Săsăuș

Physical characteristics
- Mouth: Pârâul Nou
  - coordinates: 45.8202°N 24.6056°E
- Length: 26 km (16 mi)
- Basin size: 85 km^{2} (33 sq mi)

Basin features
- Progression: Pârâul Nou→ Olt→ Danube→ Black Sea
- Tributaries
  - right: Dosul

The Săsăuș is a right tributary of the Pârâul Nou in Romania. It flows into the Pârâul Nou between the villages Săsăuș and Nou Român. Its length is 26 km (16 mi) and its basin size is 85 km^{2} (33 sq mi).
