= Fritz Schullerus =

Transylvanian Saxon painter (1866–1898)

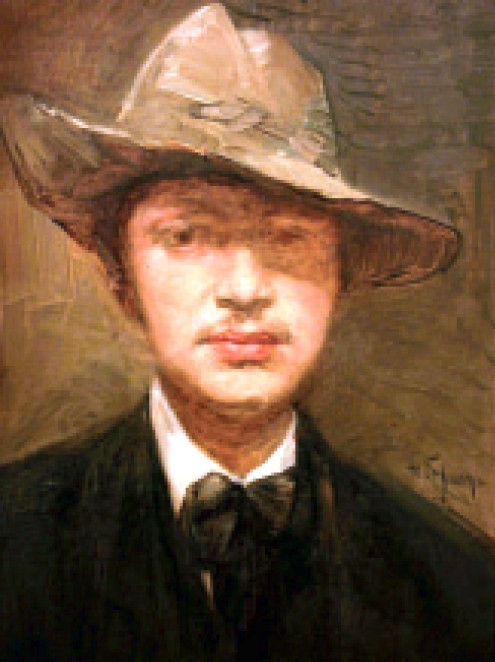
Fritz Schullerus

Fritz Schullerus (born 22 July 1866 in Făgăraș and died 22 December 1898 in Cincu) was a Transylvanian Saxon painter.

== Life ==
Schullerus was raised in a vicarage. He was the son of the evangelic pastor Gustav Adolf Schullerus (1838–1900). His younger brother was the pastor and linguist Adolf Schullerus (1864–1928). His niece was the painter Trude Schullerus (1889–1981).

Schullerus attended the evangelic gymnasium in Sibiu until 1885, where he got his first painting lessons from Carl Dörschlag. Afterwards he started 1885 architecture studies at the College of Technologie in Vienna, but dropped out. Then he began his education at the painters school in Budapest with Bertalan Székely and as a private student of Gyula Benczúr .

His paintings were inspired by the works of Arnold Böcklin and Franz von Lenbach.

Schullerus studied at the Academy of Fine Arts in Munich from 21 October 1889. He studied with Gabriel von Hackl, Karl Moor, Ludwig von Löfftz and Otto Seitz. He worked as a freelance artist in addition to school.

He was from 1892 to 1894 a painting teacher in Bistrița. From 1895 he lived in Cincu in the former house of his parents. There he dedicated himself to painting. He created portraits, paintings of charming landscapes and historical paintings from Transylvanian Saxon history. He died in 1898 at the age of 32 from tuberculosis.

== Literature ==
- V. Roth, Fritz Schullerus, Ein siebenbürgisch-sächsisches Künstlerleben, 1908 (mit Bild);
- E. Antoni, in: Forschungen zur Volks- und Landeskunde. 23, 1980, Heft 2, S. 79ff. (mit Werksverzeichnis und weiterführender Literatur);
- M. Tătaru, in: Revue roumaine d’histoire de l’art, Sér. Beaux-Arts 23, 1986, S. 67ff.;
- W. Myss, Kunst in Siebenbürgen, 1991, s. Reg., bes. S. 275 (auch für Trude S.);
- Die Siebenbürger Sachsen. Lex., hrsg. v. W. Myß, (1993) (mit Bild, auch für Trude S.);
- K. Klein, in: Zeitschrift für Siebenbürger Landeskunde. 19 (90), 1996, S. 51ff.;
