= Bruiu =

- Commune
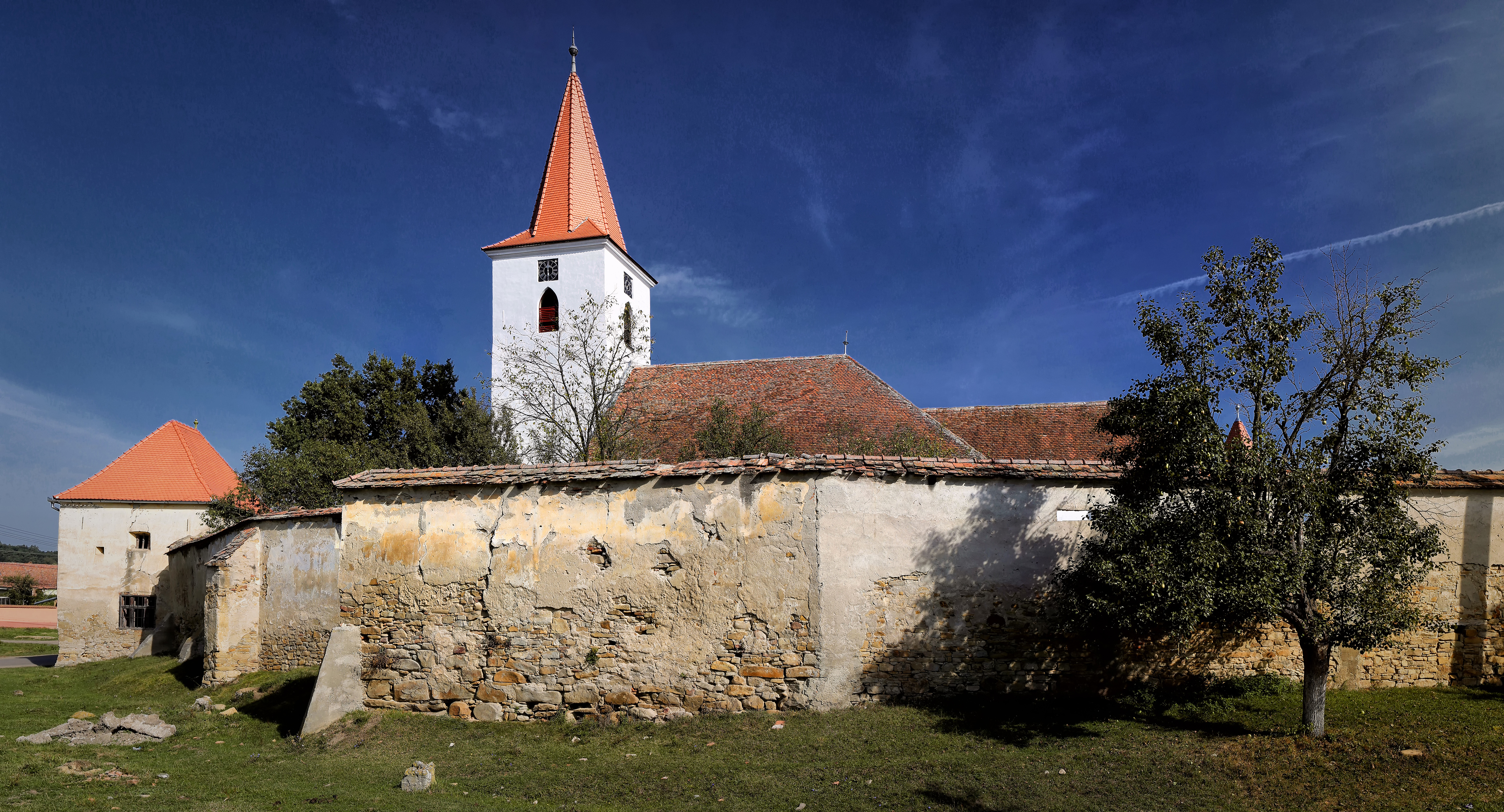
- Fortified church in Bruiu

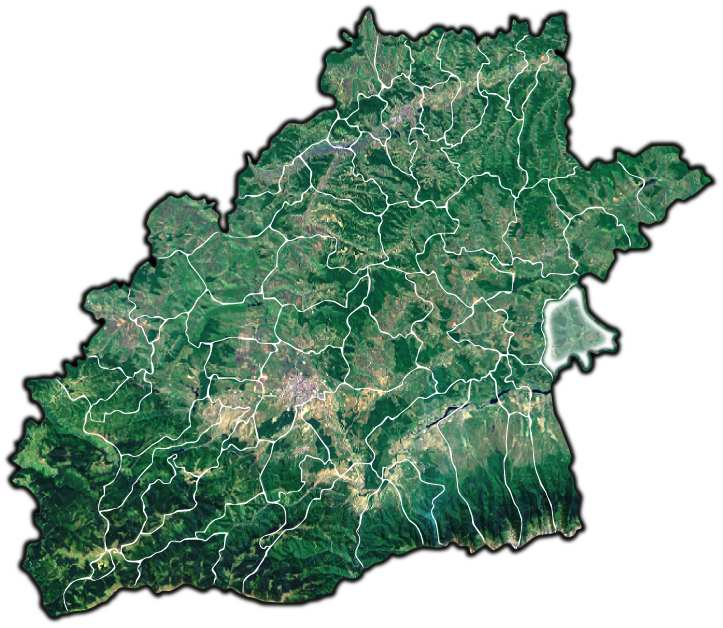
- Location in Sibiu County

- Location in Romania
- Coordinates: 45°52′N 24°42′E
- Country: Romania
- County: Sibiu

Government
  - Mayor (2020–2024): Emil Gherghel (PNL)
- Area: 97.09 km^{2} (37.49 sq mi)
- Elevation: 442 m (1,450 ft)
- Population (2021-12-01): 671
  - Density: 6.91/km^{2} (17.9/sq mi)
- Time zone: UTC+02:00 (EET)
  - Summer (DST): UTC+03:00 (EEST)
- Postal code: 557065
- Area code: (+40) 02 69
- Vehicle reg.: SB
- Website: www.primariabruiu.eu

Bruiu (German: Braller; Hungarian: Brulya) is a commune located in Sibiu County, Transylvania, Romania. It is composed of three villages: Bruiu, Gherdeal (Gürteln; Gerdály), and Șomartin (Martinsberg; Mártonhegy). Each of these has a fortified church.

== Geography ==
Situated on the Transylvanian Plateau, the commune lies on the banks of Pârâul Nou. It is located 60 km (37 mi) east of the county seat, Sibiu, on the border with Brașov County.

== Architecture ==
Built by the local Transylvanian Saxon community, the village church was first attested in 1307. Initially built as a Romanesque basilica, it was transformed in the 15th century, when Gothic elements were added.
