= Transylvanian Saxon literature =

The literature of the Transylvanian Saxons, a Romanian-German group

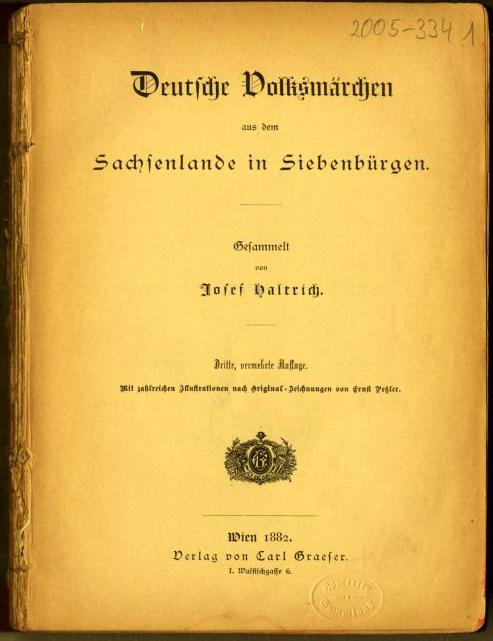
The front cover of German folk stories from Transylvania (German: Deutsche Volksmärchen aus dem Sachsenlande in Siebenbürgen) by Josef/Joseph Haltrich, published in Vienna, Austria-Hungary in 1882.

The Transylvanian Saxon literature (German: Die Siebenbürgisch-Sächsische Literatur) is a form of literature which represents the totality of literary works written in the Transylvanian Saxon dialect (a dialect of the German language spoken in Transylvania, contemporary central Romania since the High Middle Ages) and Standard German by various Transylvanian Saxon writers throughout the passage of time. These literary works include both those written in prose and in the lyric genre, from folk tales to poems and prayers. Additionally, the Transylvanian Saxon literature, in a larger sense, can also include works written by Transylvanian Saxon writers in Latin and Romanian.

The Transylvanian Saxon literature can be perceived as a branch of the German literature in Central and Eastern Europe, but also written in a specific dialect and not only in the standard form of the German language (i.e. Hochdeutsch). Renowned Transylvanian Saxon writers include Josef/Joseph Haltrich (a high school in Sighișoara/Schäßburg has been bearing his name to this day) and Dutz Schuster (who is regarded as the counterpart of Ion Luca Caragiale in Transylvanian Saxon literature). The Transylvanian Saxon literature is part of both the Romanian literature and the German literature.

== Background ==
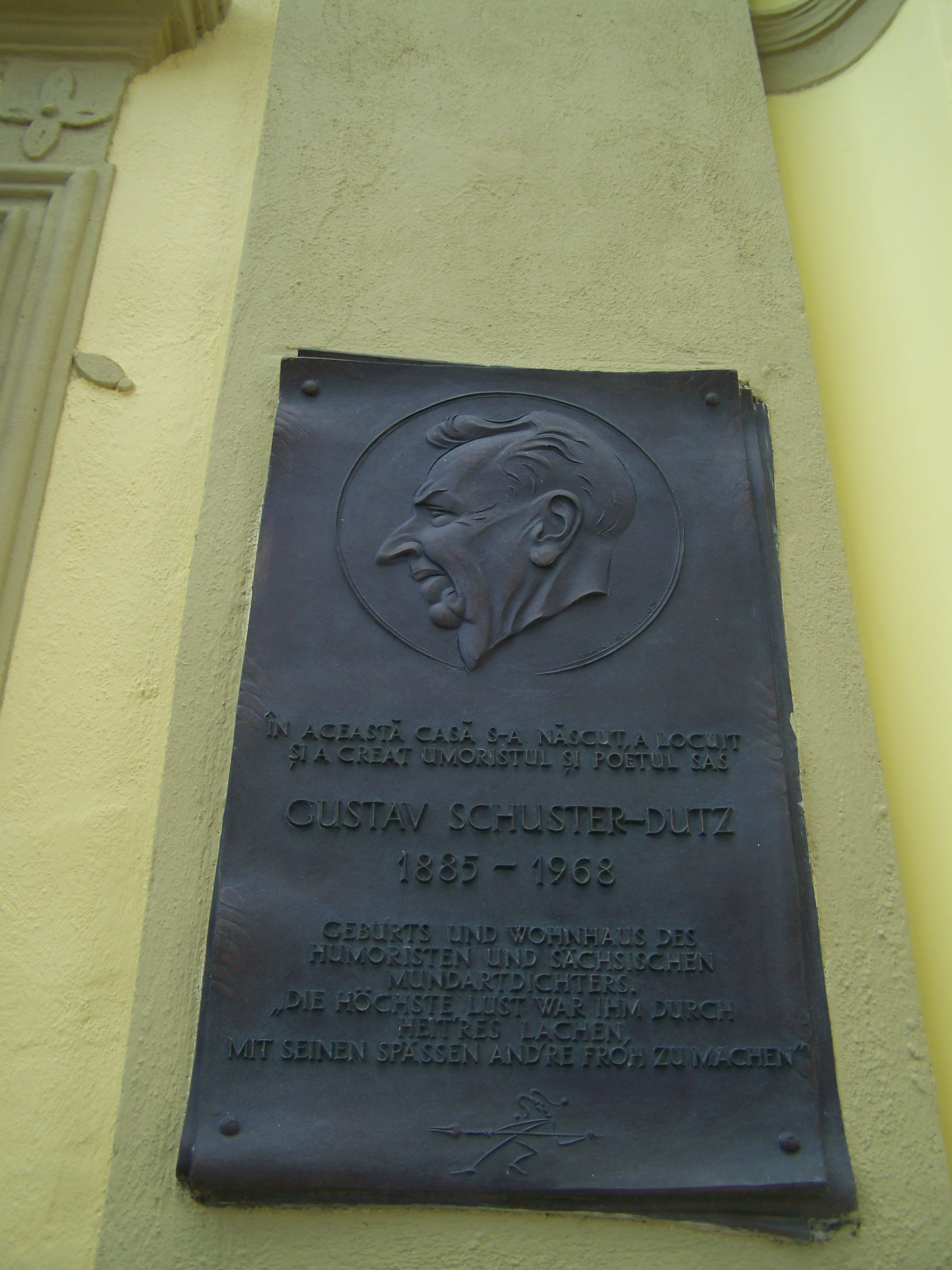
Commemorative plaque of Dutz Schuster at his memorial house in Mediaș (German: Mediasch), Transylvanian Saxon writer in the Transylvanian Saxon dialect.

The literature of the Transylvanian Saxons, a group of the German diaspora since the Middle Ages (and of the Germans of Romania as well), has evolved in Transylvania in their own dialect in the passing of time. Initially however, during the Middle Ages, many documents by Transylvanian Saxon authors were written in Latin given the fact that Latin was the language of the Roman Catholic Church and the Roman Catholic Church in Transylvania was 'the main actor of literate communication' back then. At the same time and, later on during the modern period, more official documents in standard German (i.e. Hochdeutsch) were more prevalent than the ones written in the Transylvanian Saxon dialect.

Subsequently, traditional ballads (e.g. De Råch/Die Rache/The Revenge) and ecclesiastical texts such as Our Father (i.e. 'Foater auser' in Transylvanian Saxon) had been compiled and published. They were followed by compilations of folk tales by Josef Haltrich (in the style of those written by Brothers Grimm) and other literary works such as those by Dutz Schuster. The high school in Sighișoara (German: Bergschule Schäßburg) has been bearing the name of Josef Haltrich for over 200 years.

In the summer of 2022, over 140 medieval manuscripts were found in the St. Margaret's Church in Mediaș (Mediasch). The majority of these manuscripts were written in Latin, but there are some written in German and Greek as well. They range from the 10th century up to the year 1600.

== Notable Transylvanian Saxon writers ==
Below is a list of notable Transylvanian Saxon writers who wrote in Latin, the Transylvanian Saxon dialect, or in Standard German (i.e. Hochdeutsch):

- Johannes Honterus;
- Christian Schesaeus;
- Joseph Haltrich;
- Gustav Schuster (Schuster Dutz);
- Stephan Ludwig Roth;
- George Maurer;
- Adolf Meschendörfer;
- Claus Stephani.

Another notable writer of Transylvanian Saxon/German descent from Transylvania (albeit partial), but who has been writing in Romanian, is Nicolae Breban.

== Gallery ==
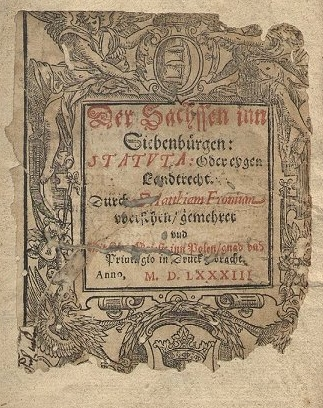
Der Sachssen inn Siebenbürgen (1583)

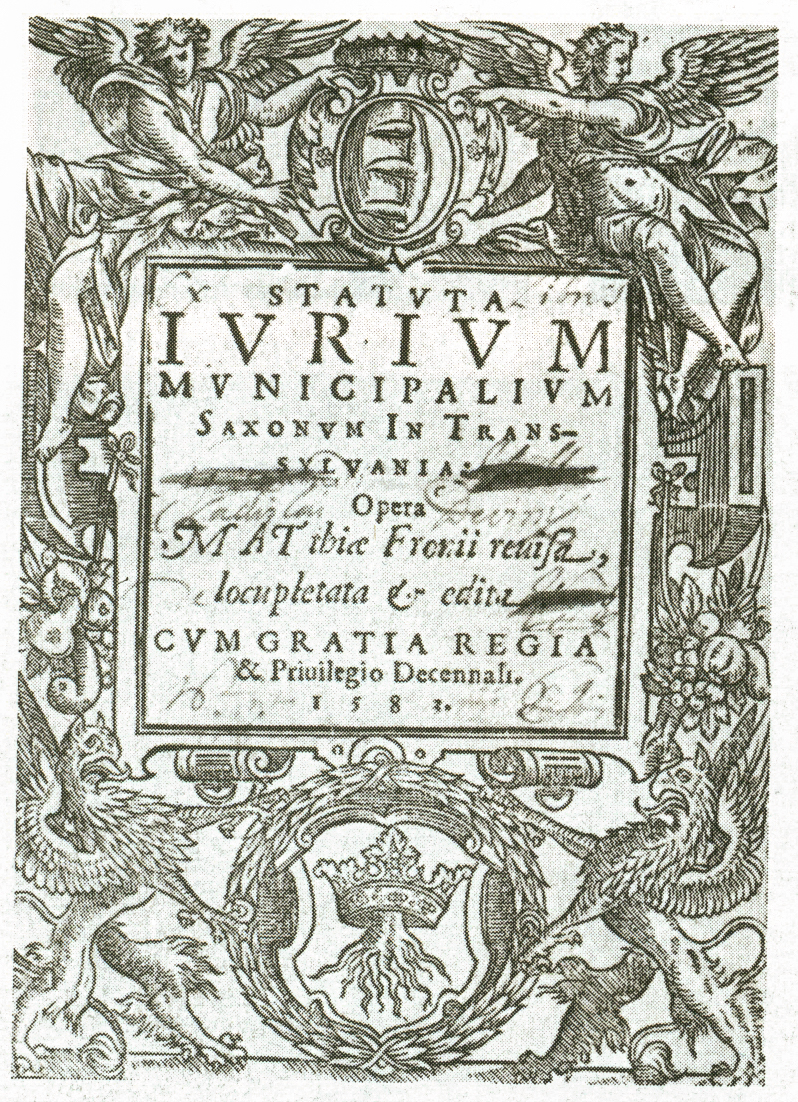
Collection of Transylvanian Saxon legislation printed in Brașov/Kronstadt (1583)

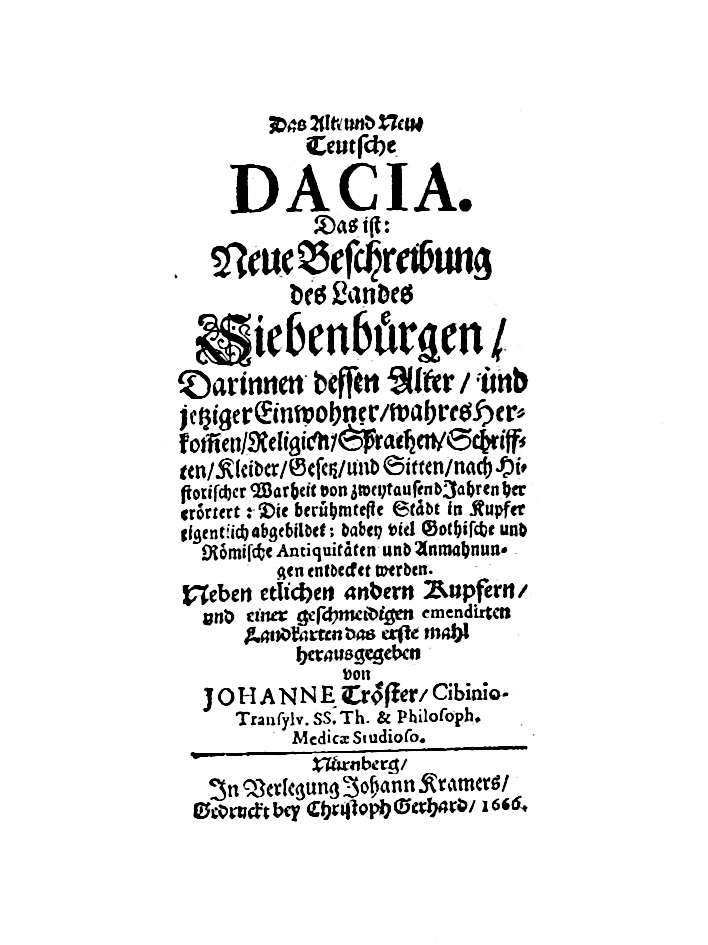
Das Alt- und Neu-Teutsche Dacia by Johannes Tröster (1666)

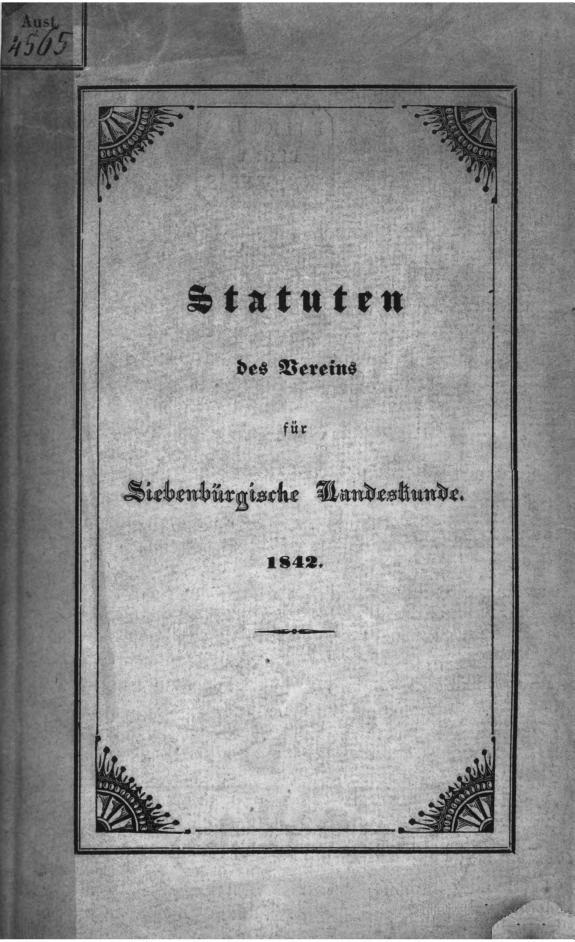
Statuten des Vereins für Siebenbürgische Landeskunde by Verein für Siebenbürgische Landeskunde (1842)
