= Sanctions (law) =

Enforcement used to incentivize obedience with the law

Sanctions, in law and legal definition, are penalties or other means of enforcement used to provide incentives for obedience with the law or other rules and regulations. Criminal sanctions can take the form of serious punishment, such as corporal or capital punishment, incarceration, or severe fines. Within the context of civil law, sanctions are usually monetary fines which are levied against a party to a lawsuit or to their attorney for violating rules of procedure, or for abusing the judicial process. The most severe sanction in a civil lawsuit is the involuntary dismissal, with prejudice, of a complaining party's cause of action, or of the responding party's answer. This has the effect of deciding the entire action against the sanctioned party without recourse, except to the degree that an appeal or trial de novo may be allowed because of reversible error. In international law, the United Nations Security Council may authorize international sanctions to maintain or restore international peace and security pursuant to article 41 of the United Nations Charter.

As a noun, the term is usually used in the plural form, even if it only refers to a single event: if a judge fines a party, it is not said that they imposed a sanction, but that they imposed sanctions.

A judge may sanction a party during a legal proceeding, by which it is implied that they impose penalties. In the United States federal court system, certain types of conduct are sanctionable under Rule 11 of the Federal Rules of Civil Procedure.

Conversely (and sometimes contradictorily), the word may be used to mean "approve of", especially in an official context. For example, the statement "The law sanctions such behavior" would imply that the behavior spoken of enjoys the specific approval of law or legal institutions.

To sanction implies to make a legal agreement. Sanction comes from the Latin word sānctiō, meaning "a law or decree that is sacred or inviolable." A legal agreement or sanction imposes approvals, rules, guidelines and penalties on conduct.

== Bibliography ==
- Herbert L. A. Hart, The Concept of Law, Oxford University Press, London, 1961;
- Gerd Spittler, Norm und Sanktion. Untersuchungen zum Sanktionsmechanismus, Walter, Olten-Freiburg, 1967;
- Norberto Bobbio, Sanzione, Novissimo Digesto, UTET, Torino, XVI, Torino, 1969, 530–540;
- Niklas Luhmann, Rechtssoziologie, Rowohlt, Reinbek bei Hamburg, 1972;
- Ota Weinberger, Der Sanktionsbegriff und die pragmatische Auswirkung gesellschaftlicher Normen, in H. Lenk, Hrsg., Normenlogik, Verlag Dokumentation, Pullach bei München, 1974, 89–111;
- Lawrence M. Friedman, The Legal System. A Social Science Perspective, Russel Sage Foundation, New York, 1975;
- Norberto Bobbio, Dalla struttura alla funzione. Nuovi studi di teoria del diritto, Comunità, Milano, 1977;
- Vilhelm Aubert, On Sanctions, in "European Yearbook in Law and Sociology", 1977, 1–19;
- H. Kelsen, Allgemeine Theorie der Normen, Manzsche Verlags- und Universitätsbuchhandlung, Wien, 1979;
- F. D’Agnostino, Sanzione, "Enciclopedia del diritto", XLI, Giuffrè, Milano, 1989, 303–328;
- Ota Weinbeger, Rechtslogik, Duncker & Humblot, Berlin, 1989;
- Charles-Albert Morand, Sanction, "Archives de Philosophie du droit", XXXV, 1990, 293–312;
- Heike Jung, Sanktionensysteme und Menschenrechte, Haupt, Bern-Stuttgart-Wien, 1992;
- Juan Carlos Bayon, Sanction, Dictionnaire encyclopédique de théorie et de sociologie du droit, L.G.D.J., Paris, 1993, 536–540;
- Realino Marra, Sanzione, "Digesto delle discipline privatistiche. Sezione civile", UTET, Torino, XVIII, 1998, 153–61.
