= Kahrs =

Kahrs is a surname. Notable people with the surname include:

- Christian Meidell Kahrs (1858–1924), Norwegian businessman
- Sophus Kahrs (1918–1986) Norwegian Waffen SS officer
- Johannes Kahrs (artist) (born 1965), German artist
- Johannes Kahrs (politician) (born 1963), German politician
- Till Kahrs, German singer and writer

== See also ==
- Kahr
