= Local government in England =

System of state administration on a local level in England

Local government in England broadly consists of three layers: civil parishes, local authority districts, and non-metropolitan counties. These districts and counties are known as principal areas and cover almost all of England. The local authorities for these areas are known as principal councils. The exceptions are the City of London and the Isles of Scilly, which each have unique forms of local government. Local government is not standardised across the country, with the last comprehensive reform taking place in 1974.

Civil parishes are the most local tier of local government, and primarily exist in rural and smaller urban areas. The responsibilities of parish councils are limited and generally consist of providing and maintaining public spaces and facilities.

Principal councils are responsible for services such as education, transport, planning applications, and waste collection and disposal. In most of England, there is a single level of local authority district known as a unitary authority. In other areas, a two-tier system of local government is used in which a non-metropolitan county council shares responsibility with a non-metropolitan district council for these services; this two-tier system has been phased out over time with the last remaining two-tier authorities scheduled to be replaced by unitary authorities by 2028 in the upcoming structural changes to local government in England.

Local authorities are considered statutory corporations and have no authority to act other than where they have been explicitly allowed by law. However, since the Localism Act 2011, local authorities have had a general power of competence meaning that 'a local authority has power to do anything that individuals generally may do.'

As of June 2026 (in addition to local authorities), England also has the following public bodies which have local and regional responsibilities:

- 20 strategic authorities
- 29 police and crime commissioners
- 4 police, fire and crime commissioners
- 10 national park authorities
- 9 Mayoral development corporations

== History ==
At a time when most parish affairs were dealt with by vestries, the Vestries Act 1831 and the Metropolis Management Act 1855 sought to establish the principle of vestries being elected by ratepayers, both men and women.

Before the Local Government Act 1888, most local government functions in England were carried out by parish vestries, Boards of Guardians, which operated workhouses and former poor law functions; elected school boards, created by the Elementary Education Act 1870, and the unelected county courts of quarter sessions. The Local Government Act 1888 created county councils, consisting of councillors, directly elected by electors, and aldermen, chosen by the councillors. There was to be one county alderman for every three councillors (but only one for every six in the new London County Council). The first elections to the councils were held in January 1889, and on 1 April they came into their powers, most of which were taken over from the quarter sessions. Elections of all councillors and half of the aldermen took place every three years thereafter. The councils' areas were designated as administrative counties. The county councils did not cover the whole country. The larger towns and some historic counties corporate were designated as county boroughs by the same act of 1888. The new system was a major modernisation, which reflected the increasing range of functions carried out by local government in late Victorian Britain. An accretion of powers took place when education was added to county council responsibilities in 1902. County councils were responsible for the more strategic services in a county or county borough.

The Local Government Act 1894 created parish councils, which replaced the vestries, and also urban district councils and rural district councils, responsible mostly for sanitation and locally-maintained highways.

The London Government Act 1899 created 28 metropolitan boroughs, replacing a larger number of vestries and district boards.

The Local Government Act 1929 increased the powers of county councils, which took over from the boards of guardians, which were abolished. County councils also took charge of highways in rural districts.

The London Government Act 1963 abolished, with effect from 1965, the London County Council and Middlesex County Council, creating the Greater London Council to replace them. The London Government Act 1963 also established 32 London borough councils.

In 1964, as recommended by the Local Government Commission for England, two pairs of administrative counties were merged to become Cambridgeshire and Isle of Ely and Huntingdon and Peterborough.

The Local Government Act 1972 completely reorganised local authorities in England and Wales. In the six largest conurbations, metropolitan county councils, with increased powers, were created. Aldermen were abolished, and all councillors were to be elected every four years. Outside Greater London and the Isles of Scilly, the Local Government Act 1972 divided England into metropolitan and non-metropolitan counties, which would have one county council and multiple district councils each. That meant that each area would be covered by two tiers of local authorities - both a county council and a district council, which would share local authority functions.

The Greater London Council was abolished by the Local Government Act 1985. In 1986 the six metropolitan county councils were abolished, with their functions transferred to the metropolitan boroughs and joint boards.

The Local Government Act 1992 established a new Local Government Commission, to review of the structure of local administration, and the introduction of some unitary authorities. The number of county councils was reduced: The counties of Avon, Berkshire, Cleveland, Hereford and Worcester, and Humberside were abolished, while Worcestershire County Council was re-established. The Isle of Wight County Council became a unitary authority, renamed as the "Isle of Wight Council".

== Structure ==
=== Parishes ===
The parishes of England, as of December 2021.

Parish councils form the most local tier of local government and have some local functions in their civil parishes. They may also be called a 'community council', 'neighbourhood council', 'village council', 'town council' or (if the parish holds city status) 'city council', but these names are stylistic and do not change their responsibilities. As of December 2021 there are 10,475 parishes in England, but they do not cover the whole of the country as many urban parishes were abolished in 1974.

The only specific statutory function of parish councils, which they must do, is establishing allotments. However, there are a number of other functions given by powers in the relevant legislation, which they can do, such as providing litter bins and building bus shelters. Their statutory functions are few, but they may provide other services with the agreement of the relevant local authorities, and under the Localism Act 2011 eligible parish councils can be granted a "general power of competence" (GPC) which allows them within certain limits the freedom to do anything an individual can do provided it is not prohibited by other legislation, as opposed to being limited to the powers explicitly granted to them by law. To be eligible for this a parish council must meet certain conditions of quality.

Civil parishes developed in the nineteenth century, based on the Church of England's parishes, which had both ecclesiastical and local government functions; parish councils were created by the Local Government Act 1894 (56 & 57 Vict. c. 73), replacing the previous vestries. The ecclesiastical parishes continue to exist, but neither they nor their parochial church councils now have any local government role.

=== Districts ===
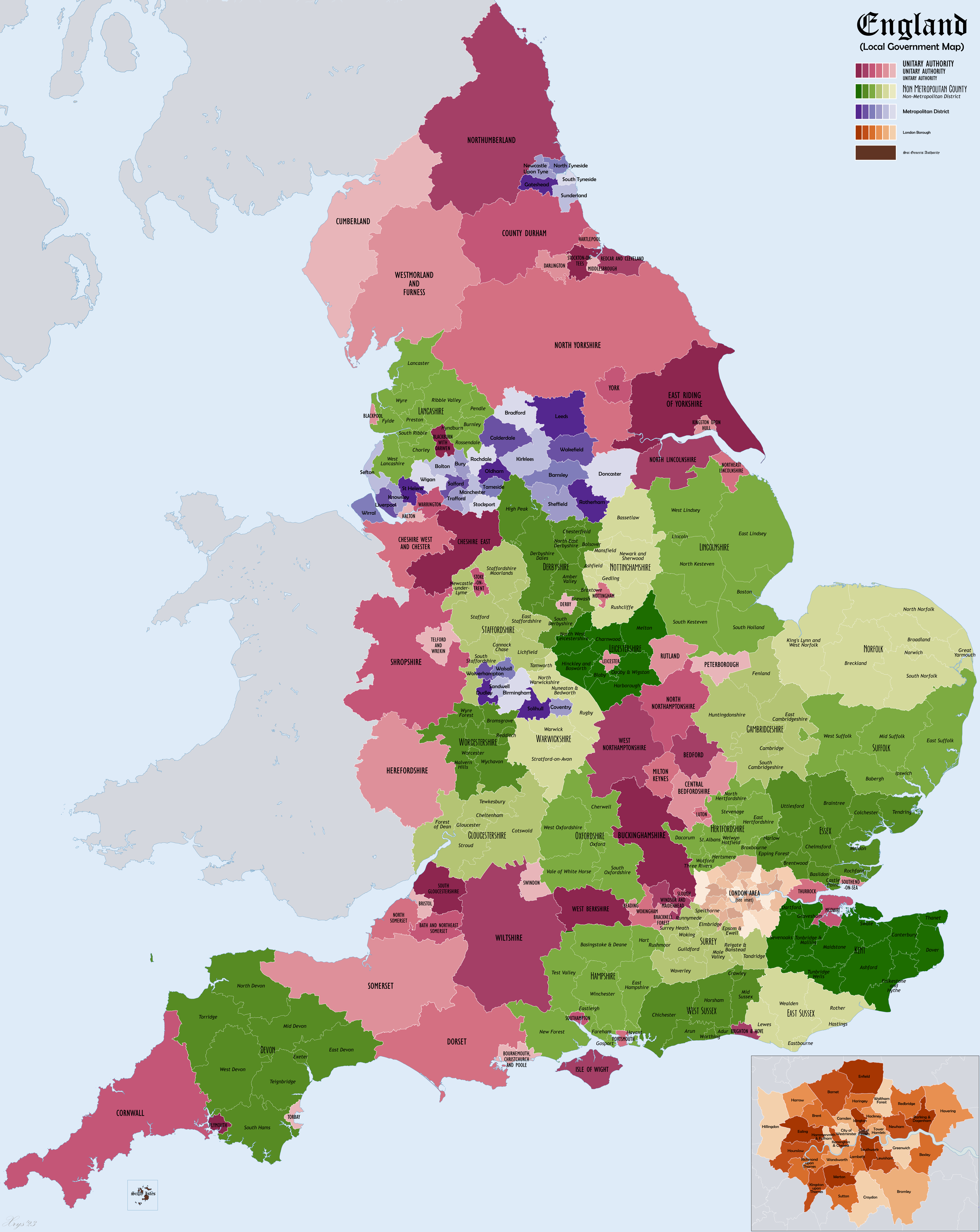
The local authority districts of England consisting of two-tier non-metropolitan districts and counties (green); the unitary authorities consisting of metropolitan districts (purple) London boroughs (orange), and other unitary authorities (pink); and the unique City of London and Isles of Scilly authorities (brown).

As of June 2026, there are 294 districts covering almost the whole of England. These are responsible for services such as education, transport, planning applications, and waste collection and disposal.

Some districts have city, Royal borough, or borough status. This is purely honorary and does not affect the council's powers, functions, or responsibilities. All districts are classified as London boroughs, metropolitan districts, or non-metropolitan districts.

There are two main forms of local authority arrangement at district level in England. As of June 2026, there are 132 unitary authorities and 164 two-tier non-metropolitan district councils. Both types provide district-level services, but in two-tier areas some functions are instead administered by non-metropolitan county councils. Unitary authorities exercise both the functions of a district council and those of the county council functions found in two-tier areas.

The Council of the Isles of Scilly provides similar single-tier functions to a unitary authority but is a sui generis authority due to its unique statutory history and the circumstances of governing a small island community. The City of London Corporation is also a sui generis local authority, exercising functions similar to those of a London borough, but with distinctive governance and electoral arrangements reflecting the historic status of the City of London.

Within the City of London are two historic liberties, the Inner Temple and the Middle Temple. These liberties, both Inns of Court, are not local authorities and have traditionally existed outside the jurisdiction of the City of London Corporation. Since 1971, many of their local government functions have been delegated to the Corporation.

== Current administrative hierarchy ==
Districts in England in 2019

As of June 2026 there are 315 principal councils in England and 4 sui generis local authorities with similar responsibilities. These 319 English local authorities can be categorised as follows:

- Unitary authorities (132)

∟ London boroughs (32)
∟ Metropolitan districts (36)
∟ Non-metropolitan districts (62)

- Two-tier authorities (185)

∟ Non-metropolitan counties (21)
∟ Non-metropolitan districts (164)

As of June 2026, 20 strategic authorities and 319 local authorities form an administrative hierarchy as shown in the table below. In much of the country there is also a more local tier of local authority, civil parishes. This administrative hierarchy differs from the ceremonial hierarchy.

| Strategic authority | Two-tier county | District |
|---|---|---|
| Cambridgeshire and Peterborough | Cambridgeshire | Cambridge |
| Cambridgeshire and Peterborough | Cambridgeshire | East Cambridgeshire |
| Cambridgeshire and Peterborough | Cambridgeshire | Fenland |
| Cambridgeshire and Peterborough | Cambridgeshire | Huntingdonshire |
| Cambridgeshire and Peterborough | Cambridgeshire | South Cambridgeshire |
| Cambridgeshire and Peterborough | —N/a | Peterborough |
| Cheshire and Warrington | —N/a | Cheshire East |
| Cheshire and Warrington | —N/a | Cheshire West and Chester |
| Cheshire and Warrington | —N/a | Warrington |
| Cumbria | —N/a | Cumberland |
| Cumbria | —N/a | Westmorland and Furness |
| Devon and Torbay | Devon | East Devon |
| Devon and Torbay | Devon | Exeter |
| Devon and Torbay | Devon | Mid Devon |
| Devon and Torbay | Devon | North Devon |
| Devon and Torbay | Devon | South Hams |
| Devon and Torbay | Devon | Teignbridge |
| Devon and Torbay | Devon | Torridge |
| Devon and Torbay | Devon | West Devon |
| Devon and Torbay | —N/a | Torbay |
| East Midlands | Derbyshire | Amber Valley |
| East Midlands | Derbyshire | Bolsover |
| East Midlands | Derbyshire | Chesterfield |
| East Midlands | Derbyshire | Derbyshire Dales |
| East Midlands | Derbyshire | Erewash |
| East Midlands | Derbyshire | High Peak |
| East Midlands | Derbyshire | North East Derbyshire |
| East Midlands | Derbyshire | South Derbyshire |
| East Midlands | —N/a | Derby |
| East Midlands | Nottinghamshire | Ashfield |
| East Midlands | Nottinghamshire | Bassetlaw |
| East Midlands | Nottinghamshire | Broxtowe |
| East Midlands | Nottinghamshire | Gedling |
| East Midlands | Nottinghamshire | Mansfield |
| East Midlands | Nottinghamshire | Newark and Sherwood |
| East Midlands | Nottinghamshire | Rushcliffe |
| East Midlands | —N/a | Nottingham |
| Greater Lincolnshire | Lincolnshire | Boston |
| Greater Lincolnshire | Lincolnshire | Lincoln |
| Greater Lincolnshire | Lincolnshire | East Lindsey |
| Greater Lincolnshire | Lincolnshire | North Kesteven |
| Greater Lincolnshire | Lincolnshire | South Holland |
| Greater Lincolnshire | Lincolnshire | South Kesteven |
| Greater Lincolnshire | Lincolnshire | West Lindsey |
| Greater Lincolnshire | —N/a | North Lincolnshire |
| Greater Lincolnshire | —N/a | North East Lincolnshire |
| Greater London | —N/a | Barking and Dagenham |
| Greater London | —N/a | Barnet |
| Greater London | —N/a | Bexley |
| Greater London | —N/a | Brent |
| Greater London | —N/a | Bromley |
| Greater London | —N/a | Camden |
| Greater London | —N/a | Croydon |
| Greater London | —N/a | Ealing |
| Greater London | —N/a | Enfield |
| Greater London | —N/a | Greenwich |
| Greater London | —N/a | Hackney |
| Greater London | —N/a | Hammersmith and Fulham |
| Greater London | —N/a | Haringey |
| Greater London | —N/a | Harrow |
| Greater London | —N/a | Havering |
| Greater London | —N/a | Hillingdon |
| Greater London | —N/a | Hounslow |
| Greater London | —N/a | Islington |
| Greater London | —N/a | Kensington and Chelsea |
| Greater London | —N/a | Kingston upon Thames |
| Greater London | —N/a | Lambeth |
| Greater London | —N/a | Lewisham |
| Greater London | —N/a | City of London |
| Greater London | —N/a | City of London: Inner Temple |
| Greater London | —N/a | City of London: Middle Temple |
| Greater London | —N/a | Merton |
| Greater London | —N/a | Newham |
| Greater London | —N/a | Redbridge |
| Greater London | —N/a | Richmond upon Thames |
| Greater London | —N/a | Southwark |
| Greater London | —N/a | Sutton |
| Greater London | —N/a | Tower Hamlets |
| Greater London | —N/a | Waltham Forest |
| Greater London | —N/a | Wandsworth |
| Greater London | —N/a | Westminster |
| Greater Manchester | —N/a | Bolton |
| Greater Manchester | —N/a | Bury |
| Greater Manchester | —N/a | Manchester |
| Greater Manchester | —N/a | Oldham |
| Greater Manchester | —N/a | Rochdale |
| Greater Manchester | —N/a | Salford |
| Greater Manchester | —N/a | Stockport |
| Greater Manchester | —N/a | Tameside |
| Greater Manchester | —N/a | Trafford |
| Greater Manchester | —N/a | Wigan |
| Hampshire and the Solent | Hampshire | Basingstoke and Deane |
| Hampshire and the Solent | Hampshire | East Hampshire |
| Hampshire and the Solent | Hampshire | Eastleigh |
| Hampshire and the Solent | Hampshire | Fareham |
| Hampshire and the Solent | Hampshire | Gosport |
| Hampshire and the Solent | Hampshire | Hart |
| Hampshire and the Solent | Hampshire | Havant |
| Hampshire and the Solent | Hampshire | New Forest |
| Hampshire and the Solent | Hampshire | Rushmoor |
| Hampshire and the Solent | Hampshire | Test Valley |
| Hampshire and the Solent | Hampshire | Winchester |
| Hampshire and the Solent | —N/a | Isle of Wight |
| Hampshire and the Solent | —N/a | Portsmouth |
| Hampshire and the Solent | —N/a | Southampton |
| Hull and East Yorkshire | —N/a | Hull |
| Hull and East Yorkshire | —N/a | East Riding of Yorkshire |
| Lancashire | Lancashire | Burnley |
| Lancashire | Lancashire | Chorley |
| Lancashire | Lancashire | Fylde |
| Lancashire | Lancashire | Hyndburn |
| Lancashire | Lancashire | Lancaster |
| Lancashire | Lancashire | Pendle |
| Lancashire | Lancashire | Preston |
| Lancashire | Lancashire | Ribble Valley |
| Lancashire | Lancashire | Rossendale |
| Lancashire | Lancashire | South Ribble |
| Lancashire | Lancashire | West Lancashire |
| Lancashire | Lancashire | Wyre |
| Lancashire | —N/a | Blackburn with Darwen |
| Lancashire | —N/a | Blackpool |
| Liverpool City Region | —N/a | Halton |
| Liverpool City Region | —N/a | Knowsley |
| Liverpool City Region | —N/a | Liverpool |
| Liverpool City Region | —N/a | St Helens |
| Liverpool City Region | —N/a | Sefton |
| Liverpool City Region | —N/a | Wirral |
| North East | —N/a | Durham |
| North East | —N/a | Gateshead |
| North East | —N/a | Newcastle upon Tyne |
| North East | —N/a | North Tyneside |
| North East | —N/a | Northumberland |
| North East | —N/a | South Tyneside |
| North East | —N/a | Sunderland |
| South Yorkshire | —N/a | Barnsley |
| South Yorkshire | —N/a | Doncaster |
| South Yorkshire | —N/a | Rotherham |
| South Yorkshire | —N/a | Sheffield |
| Sussex and Brighton | East Sussex | Eastbourne |
| Sussex and Brighton | East Sussex | Hastings |
| Sussex and Brighton | East Sussex | Lewes |
| Sussex and Brighton | East Sussex | Rother |
| Sussex and Brighton | East Sussex | Wealden |
| Sussex and Brighton | West Sussex | Adur |
| Sussex and Brighton | West Sussex | Arun |
| Sussex and Brighton | West Sussex | Chichester |
| Sussex and Brighton | West Sussex | Crawley |
| Sussex and Brighton | West Sussex | Horsham |
| Sussex and Brighton | West Sussex | Mid Sussex |
| Sussex and Brighton | West Sussex | Worthing |
| Sussex and Brighton | —N/a | Brighton and Hove |
| Tees Valley | —N/a | Darlington |
| Tees Valley | —N/a | Hartlepool |
| Tees Valley | —N/a | Middlesbrough |
| Tees Valley | —N/a | Redcar and Cleveland |
| Tees Valley | —N/a | Stockton-on-Tees |
| West Midlands | —N/a | Birmingham |
| West Midlands | —N/a | Coventry |
| West Midlands | —N/a | Dudley |
| West Midlands | —N/a | Sandwell |
| West Midlands | —N/a | Solihull |
| West Midlands | —N/a | Walsall |
| West Midlands | —N/a | Wolverhampton |
| West of England | —N/a | Bath and North East Somerset |
| West of England | —N/a | Bristol |
| West of England | —N/a | South Gloucestershire |
| West Yorkshire | —N/a | Bradford |
| West Yorkshire | —N/a | Calderdale |
| West Yorkshire | —N/a | Kirklees |
| West Yorkshire | —N/a | Leeds |
| West Yorkshire | —N/a | Wakefield |
| York and North Yorkshire | —N/a | North Yorkshire |
| York and North Yorkshire | —N/a | York |
| —N/a | —N/a | Bedford |
| —N/a | —N/a | Bournemouth, Christchurch and Poole |
| —N/a | —N/a | Bracknell Forest |
| —N/a | —N/a | Buckinghamshire |
| —N/a | —N/a | Central Bedfordshire |
| —N/a | —N/a | Cornwall |
| —N/a | —N/a | Dorset |
| —N/a | Essex | Basildon |
| —N/a | Essex | Braintree |
| —N/a | Essex | Brentwood |
| —N/a | Essex | Castle Point |
| —N/a | Essex | Chelmsford |
| —N/a | Essex | Colchester |
| —N/a | Essex | Epping Forest |
| —N/a | Essex | Harlow |
| —N/a | Essex | Maldon |
| —N/a | Essex | Rochford |
| —N/a | Essex | Tendring |
| —N/a | Essex | Uttlesford |
| —N/a | Gloucestershire | Cheltenham |
| —N/a | Gloucestershire | Cotswold |
| —N/a | Gloucestershire | Forest of Dean |
| —N/a | Gloucestershire | Gloucester |
| —N/a | Gloucestershire | Stroud |
| —N/a | Gloucestershire | Tewkesbury |
| —N/a | —N/a | Herefordshire |
| —N/a | Hertfordshire | Broxbourne |
| —N/a | Hertfordshire | Dacorum |
| —N/a | Hertfordshire | East Hertfordshire |
| —N/a | Hertfordshire | Hertsmere |
| —N/a | Hertfordshire | North Hertfordshire |
| —N/a | Hertfordshire | St Albans |
| —N/a | Hertfordshire | Stevenage |
| —N/a | Hertfordshire | Three Rivers |
| —N/a | Hertfordshire | Watford |
| —N/a | Hertfordshire | Welwyn Hatfield |
| —N/a | —N/a | Isles of Scilly |
| —N/a | Kent | Ashford |
| —N/a | Kent | Canterbury |
| —N/a | Kent | Dartford |
| —N/a | Kent | Dover |
| —N/a | Kent | Folkestone and Hythe |
| —N/a | Kent | Gravesham |
| —N/a | Kent | Maidstone |
| —N/a | Kent | Sevenoaks |
| —N/a | Kent | Swale |
| —N/a | Kent | Thanet |
| —N/a | Kent | Tonbridge and Malling |
| —N/a | Kent | Tunbridge Wells |
| —N/a | —N/a | Leicester |
| —N/a | Leicestershire | Blaby |
| —N/a | Leicestershire | Charnwood |
| —N/a | Leicestershire | Harborough |
| —N/a | Leicestershire | Hinckley and Bosworth |
| —N/a | Leicestershire | Melton |
| —N/a | Leicestershire | North West Leicestershire |
| —N/a | Leicestershire | Oadby and Wigston |
| —N/a | —N/a | Luton |
| —N/a | —N/a | Medway |
| —N/a | —N/a | Milton Keynes |
| —N/a | Norfolk | Breckland |
| —N/a | Norfolk | Broadland |
| —N/a | Norfolk | Great Yarmouth |
| —N/a | Norfolk | King's Lynn and West Norfolk |
| —N/a | Norfolk | North Norfolk |
| —N/a | Norfolk | Norwich |
| —N/a | Norfolk | South Norfolk |
| —N/a | —N/a | North Northamptonshire |
| —N/a | —N/a | North Somerset |
| —N/a | Oxfordshire | Cherwell |
| —N/a | Oxfordshire | Oxford |
| —N/a | Oxfordshire | South Oxfordshire |
| —N/a | Oxfordshire | Vale of White Horse |
| —N/a | Oxfordshire | West Oxfordshire |
| —N/a | —N/a | Plymouth |
| —N/a | —N/a | Reading |
| —N/a | —N/a | Rutland |
| —N/a | —N/a | Shropshire |
| —N/a | —N/a | Slough |
| —N/a | —N/a | Somerset |
| —N/a | —N/a | Southend-on-Sea |
| —N/a | Staffordshire | Cannock Chase |
| —N/a | Staffordshire | East Staffordshire |
| —N/a | Staffordshire | Lichfield |
| —N/a | Staffordshire | Newcastle-under-Lyme |
| —N/a | Staffordshire | South Staffordshire |
| —N/a | Staffordshire | Stafford |
| —N/a | Staffordshire | Staffordshire Moorlands |
| —N/a | Staffordshire | Tamworth |
| —N/a | —N/a | Stoke-on-Trent |
| —N/a | Suffolk | Babergh |
| —N/a | Suffolk | East Suffolk |
| —N/a | Suffolk | Ipswich |
| —N/a | Suffolk | Mid Suffolk |
| —N/a | Suffolk | West Suffolk |
| —N/a | Surrey | Elmbridge |
| —N/a | Surrey | Epsom and Ewell |
| —N/a | Surrey | Guildford |
| —N/a | Surrey | Mole Valley |
| —N/a | Surrey | Reigate and Banstead |
| —N/a | Surrey | Runnymede |
| —N/a | Surrey | Spelthorne |
| —N/a | Surrey | Surrey Heath |
| —N/a | Surrey | Tandridge |
| —N/a | Surrey | Waverley |
| —N/a | Surrey | Woking |
| —N/a | —N/a | Swindon |
| —N/a | —N/a | Telford and Wrekin |
| —N/a | —N/a | Thurrock |
| —N/a | Warwickshire | North Warwickshire |
| —N/a | Warwickshire | Nuneaton and Bedworth |
| —N/a | Warwickshire | Rugby |
| —N/a | Warwickshire | Stratford-on-Avon |
| —N/a | Warwickshire | Warwick |
| —N/a | —N/a | West Berkshire |
| —N/a | —N/a | West Northamptonshire |
| —N/a | —N/a | Wiltshire |
| —N/a | —N/a | Windsor and Maidenhead |
| —N/a | —N/a | Wokingham |
| —N/a | Worcestershire | Bromsgrove |
| —N/a | Worcestershire | Malvern Hills |
| —N/a | Worcestershire | Redditch |
| —N/a | Worcestershire | Worcester |
| —N/a | Worcestershire | Wychavon |
| —N/a | Worcestershire | Wyre Forest |

== Summary of authority types ==
=== English local authorities ===
| Type | Notes | Example(s) |
|---|---|---|
| Civil parishes | Most local type of local authority across many parts of England. | Newbald Parish Council, Arlesey Parish Council, Handforth Town Council |
The only specific statutory function of parish councils, which they must do, is establishing allotments. However, there are a number of other functions given by powers in the relevant legislation, which they can do, such as providing litter bins and building bus shelters. According to the Localism Act 2011 eligible parish councils can be granted "general power of competence" (GPC) which allows them, within certain limits, the freedom to do anything an individual can do provided it is not prohibited by other legislation.
| Two-tier non-metropolitan districts | Type of local authority outside of Greater London. Non-metropolitan district (lower tier) in a two-tier system of local government. | Epping Forest District Council, Gosport Borough Council, Woking Borough Council |
Responsible for local planning and building control, local roads, council housing, environmental health, markets and fairs, refuse collection and recycling, cemeteries and crematoria, leisure services, parks, and tourism.
| Two-tier non-metropolitan counties | Type of local authority outside of Greater London. Non-metropolitan county (upper tier) in a two-tier system of local government. | Oxfordshire County Council, Nottinghamshire County Council |
Responsible for running the largest and most expensive local services such as education, social services, libraries, main roads, public transport, fire services, Trading Standards, waste disposal and strategic planning.
| Unitary non-metropolitan authorities | Type of local authority outside of Greater London. Non-metropolitan local authority in a unitary system of local government where a single local authority combines the powers and functions of a non-metropolitan district and a non-metropolitan county. | Plymouth City Council, Durham County Council, North Somerset Council, Slough Borough Council |
Responsible for all local government services.
| Metropolitan districts | Type of local authority outside of Greater London. Metropolitan district in a unitary system of local government where a single local authority provides local government services. | Stockport Metropolitan Borough Council, Newcastle City Council, Sheffield City Council |
Metropolitan districts are administered by Metropolitan borough councils (sometimes abbreviated MBCs), which are elected every four years. Metropolitan districts were originally part of a two-tier system with metropolitan county councils. The two-tier structure differed from non-metropolitan areas in the division of powers between district and county councils. Metropolitan borough councils were local education authorities, and were also responsible for social services and libraries. Metropolitan county councils were abolished in 1986 and most of their functions were transferred to the metropolitan boroughs making them unitary authorities.
| London boroughs | Type of local authority in Greater London. District in a unitary system of local government where a single local authority provides local government services. | Tower Hamlets London Borough Council, Westminster City Council |
The London boroughs are administered by London borough councils (sometimes abbreviated LBCs), which are elected every four years. They were originally part of a two-tier system of local government with the Greater London Council (GLC). The GLC was abolished in 1986 and most of its functions were transferred to the London boroughs making them unitary authorities.Since 1986, they are the principal local authorities in London and are responsible for running most local services, such as schools, social services, waste collection and roads. Since 2000, some London-wide services are overseen by the Greater London Authority, and some services and lobbying of government are pooled within London Councils. Some councils group together for services such as waste collection and disposal. Each borough council is a local education authority.
| Isles of Scilly | Sui generis local authority for the Isles of Scilly. | Council of the Isles of Scilly |
| City of London | Sui generis local authority for the City of London. | City of London Corporation |
| Inner Temple | Sui generis body for the Inner Temple. An area within the City of London that is historically not governed by the City of London Corporation and is regarded as a local authority for most purposes. | Governing Benchers of the Inn |
| Middle Temple | Sui generis body for the Middle Temple. An area within the City of London that is historically not governed by the City of London Corporation and is regarded as a local authority for most purposes. | Parliament of the Middle Temple |

=== Other English public bodies with local and regional responsibilities ===
| Type | Notes | Example(s) |
|---|---|---|
| Strategic authority | Strategic authorities were introduced by the English Devolution and Community Empowerment Act 2026 as an overarching category of devolved public authority which includes the Greater London Authority, combined authorities, and combined county authorities. | Greater London Authority, Tees Valley Combined Authority, East Midlands Combined County Authority |
Strategic authorities are granted certain delegated functions from central government in order to deliver functions such as transport and economic development more effectively.
| Police and crime commissioner (PCC) | Replaced police authorities. Some strategic authorities may assume responsibility for policing, e.g. South Yorkshire Mayoral Combined Authority. | Hertfordshire Police and Crime Commissioner |
PCCs are responsible for ensuring an effective police force within their area, and to hold the chief constable to account for the delivery of the police and crime plan. Police and crime commissioners are hold the police fund (from which all policing of the area is financed) and are able to raise the local policing precept from council tax. Police and crime commissioners are also responsible for the appointment, suspension and dismissal of the Chief Constable.
| Police, fire and crime commissioner (PFCC) | Replaced police authorities and fire authorities. Some strategic authorities may assume responsibility for policing, e.g. Greater Manchester Combined Authority. | Essex Police, Fire and Crime Commissioner |
Same as PCC, with additional responsibility for Fire and Rescue.
| National park authority | Established by the Environment Act 1995. | Peak District National Park Authority |
Responsible for maintenance of a national park.
| Broads Authority | Established by the Norfolk and Suffolk Broads Act 1988 | Broads Authority |
Responsible for maintenance of the Norfolk Broads.
| Mayoral development corporation | The Localism Act 2011 and Cities and Local Government Devolution Act 2016 permit strategic authority mayors to create mayoral development corporations. | Middlesbrough Development Corporation |
Holds planning powers over a specific area and is awarded funding for urban regeneration.

== Councillors and governance ==
All local authorities are made up of councillors, who represent geographical wards and divisions. There are 7,026 wards as of December 2021. Local authorities run on four-year cycles and councillors may be elected all at once, by halves or by thirds; although the Electoral Commission has recommended that all authorities use whole council elections every 4 years.

Local authorities have a choice of executive arrangements under the Local Government Act 2000: mayor and cabinet executive, leader and cabinet executive, a committee system or bespoke arrangements approved by the Secretary of State. As of June 2026, 13 local authorities have a directly elected mayor. Some functions are just the responsibility of the executive of a local authority, but local authorities must also have at least one overview and scrutiny committee to hold the executive to account.

In the 2023/24 financial year, 33% of budgeted service expenditure across local government as a whole was set to be on education, 19% on adult social care, 13% on police, 11% on children's social care and 24% on all other services.

Cornwall Council has been subject to a devolution deal, which are usually reserved to strategic authorities for additional functions and funding. Like some strategic authorities and parish councils, local authorities have a general power of competence. Separate to strategic authorities, two or more local authorities can also work together through joint boards (for legally-required services: fire, public transport and waste disposal), joint committees (voluntarily) or through contracting out and agency arrangements.

== Funding ==
Local authorities have three main sources of funding: UK Government grants, council tax and business rates. In the financial year 2019/20, local authorities received 22% of their funding from grants, 52% from council tax and 27% from retained business rates. In the financial year 2023/24, 51% of revenue expenditure is expected to come from UK Government grants, 31% from council tax and 15% from retained business rates.

Local government can also receive some money from fees and charges for the use of services, returns and interest from investments, commercial income, fixed penalty notices and capital receipts. The Information Commissioner's Office has ruled that there is a public interest in disclosing information about local government investments which will generally outweigh any concerns about whether disclosure could affect an investment's performance or be protected by confidentiality requirements.

Local authorities cannot borrow money to finance day-to-day spending and so must rely on yearly income or reserves for this type of expenditure, although they can borrow to fund capital expenditure.

Local government in England as a whole has limited revenue-raising powers compared to other G7 countries.

=== UK government grants ===
In the 20th century, local authorities found that the costs of providing services exceeded the revenues raised from local taxes and so grants from the UK Government (specifically the Treasury) gradually increased. However, UK Government grants were cut by 40% in real terms between the financial years 2009/10 and 2019/20, although grant income did grow due to the COVID-19 pandemic.

Local government receives two types of grants: the Revenue Support Grant, which can be spent on any service according to the wishes of the local government body in question, and specific grants, which are usually 'ring fenced' to specifically defined service areas.

=== Council tax ===
Council tax was introduced in 1993 to replace the 'poll tax'. It is a domestic property tax, based on eight bands (A to H) depending on the value of the property on 1 April 1991. Various discounts are set out in law and exist at the discretion of billing authorities.

On a yearly basis, local government bodies review and consider whether to increase or decrease the level of council tax to fund their spending plans. The level at which a local authority can increase council tax each year without holding a local referendum is regulated by the Localism Act 2011. In every area, one local authority acts as the billing authority (the district council in two-tier areas), which prepares and collects council tax bills. Other local and regional government bodies (like county councils in two-tier areas, police and crime commissioners, fire authorities, parish councils and strategic authorities) act as precepting authorities, which notify the relevant billing authority of their decision on council tax and later receive this money from the billing authority.

Between financial years 2009/10 and 2021/22, council tax rates increased by 30% in real terms, in light of reduced grants from the UK Government.

=== Business rates ===
Business rates is a tax on business premises. It is based on the rateable value of the premises (set by the Valuation Office Agency) and a business rate multiplier. It is set and collected by billing authorities.

Reforms in 2013 now mean that local authorities keep 50% of business rate revenues raised locally. The UK Government then distributes the remaining 50% of business rate revenues according to its own judgement. It was initially planned to increase the proportion of business rates that local authorities retain to 100%, but this was indefinitely delayed in 2021.

== Criticisms ==
In 2022, the Public Administration and Constitutional Affairs Committee said that it had "significant concerns about the current governance arrangements for England":

If the people within government are unsure at times where powers and responsibility, and hence accountability, rest, this lack of clarity is magnified for individuals who have little knowledge or experience of the structures. This has the potential to leave individuals less likely to be able to access what they need from government, leaving them often unable to know who is responsible, and as a result are not properly able to hold their democratic representatives to account.

The Committee also said that "[t]he evidence is clear both practically and democratically that the overly centralised arrangements of government in England are problematic" and that reform was also needed of funding structures.

== See also ==
- List of local governments in the United Kingdom
- Local government in Northern Ireland – System of state administration on a local level in Northern Ireland
- Local government in Scotland – System of state administration on a local level in Scotland
- Local government in Wales – System of state administration on a local level in Wales
- Political make-up of local councils in the United Kingdom
