= Kahr =

Kahr (German pronunciation: [ˈkaːɐ̯]) is a German surname. Notable people with the surname include:

- Andrew Kahr, executive
- Claudia Kahr (b 1955), Austrian judge
- Gustav Ritter von Kahr (1862–1934), German politician
- Madlyn Millner Kahr (1913–2004), American art historian, and educator

== See also ==
- KAHR, radio station
- Kahr Arms, manufacturer
- The Confession of Ina Kahr, a 1954 West German crime film
