= Vladimír Kubeš =

Czech jurist, philosopher of law (1908 – 1988)

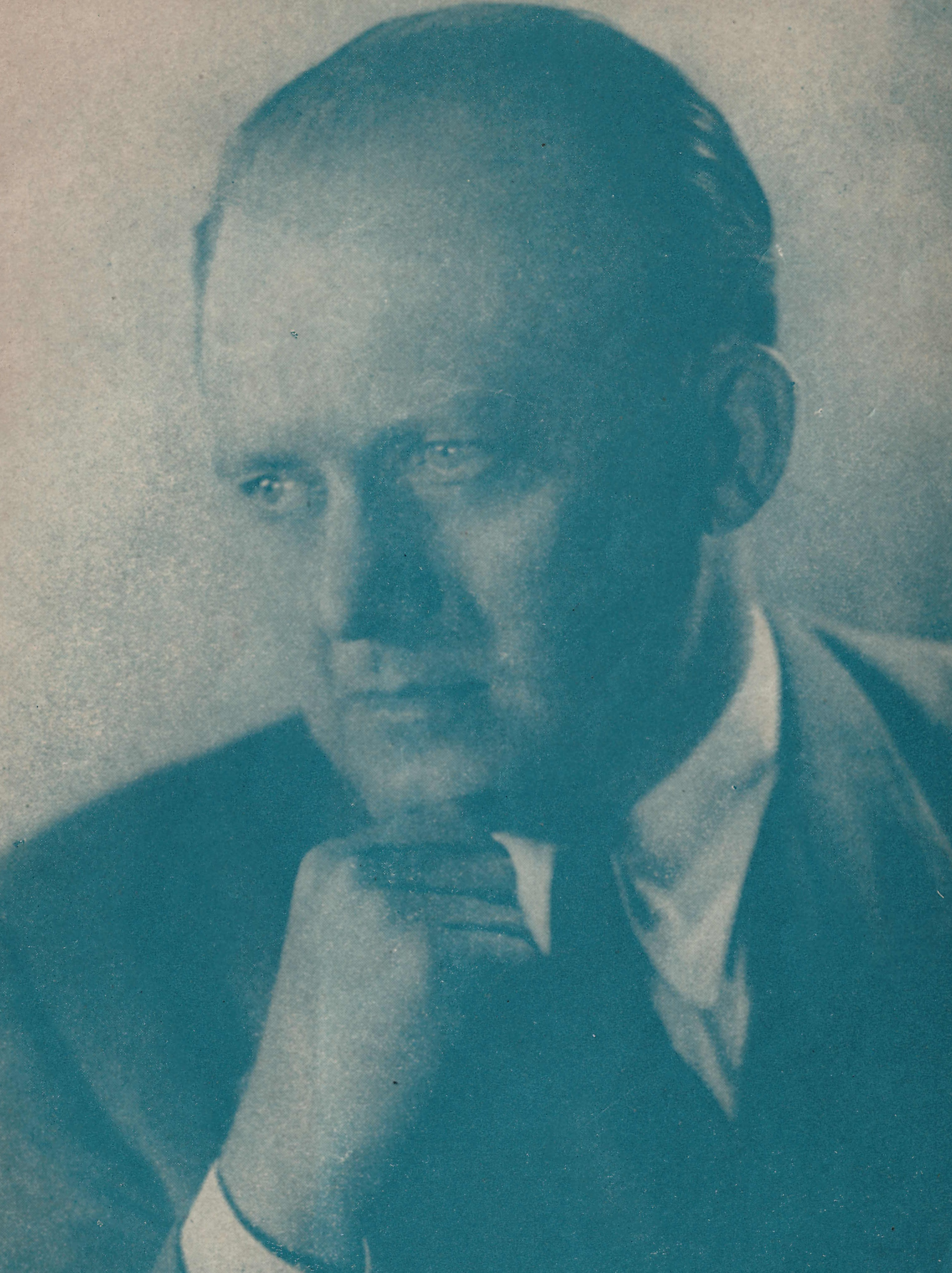
Vladimír Kubeš (1947)

Vladimír Kubeš (19 July 1908, in Královo Pole – 14 November 1988, in Brno) was a Czechoslovak jurist and a noted philosopher of law.

After studies in Brno, he became an official in the department of finance, and in 1945 professor of civil law and philosophy of law at the Masaryk University of Brno. In 1948, he was removed from office by the Communist government, and intermittently imprisoned. Towards the end of the 1960s, he was rehabilitated, but removed from his post again in 1970. Since 1974 he was visiting professor for the theory of law in Vienna.

With Ota Weinberger, Kubeš was the most prominent Czech jurist of the second half of the 20th century. He remains known mainly for his works on the philosophy of law, including Grundfragen der Philosophie des Rechts (1977). Initially following the normative theory of František Weyr and Hans Kelsen's Pure Theory of Law, he was later more influenced by Nicolai Hartmann. Kubeš' work reflects a generally optimistic and idealistic worldview, positing a process of moral and ethical improvement in both individuals and the world.
