= Faculty of Law of the University of Graz =

Public law school in Graz, Austria

Faculty of Law, University of Graz
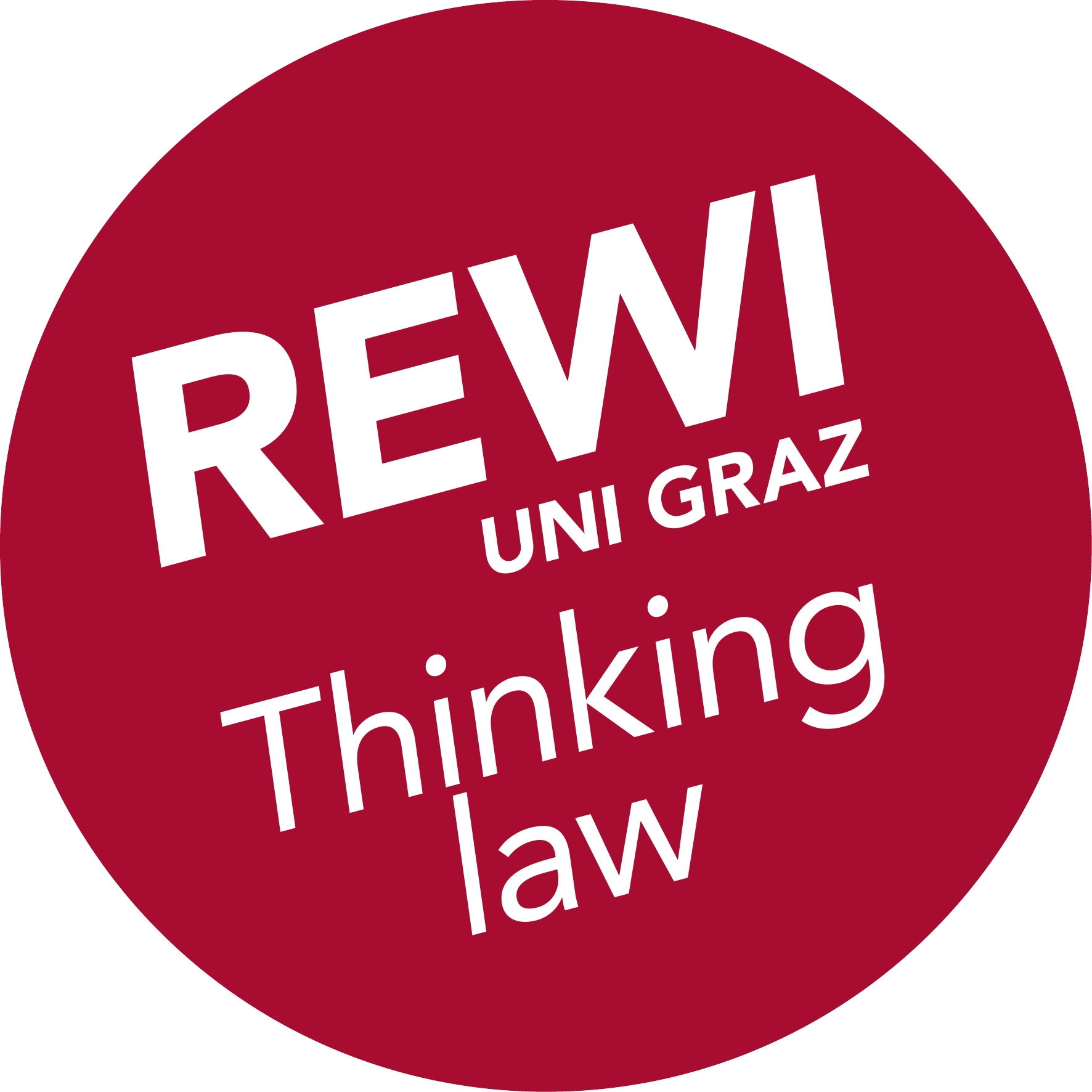
- Established: 1778; 248 years ago
- Parent institution: University of Graz
- Dean: Univ.-Prof. Dr. Gabriele Schmölzer
- Students: 3.580 (Fall 2022)
- Location: Graz, Styria, Austria
- Website: rewi.uni-graz.at

The Faculty of Law of the University of Graz (REWI Uni Graz) was established in 1778 as the third faculty of the University of Graz.

== Overview ==
Its curricula include, besides the classical Diploma (Mag.iur.) and Doctoral Program in Law (Dr.iur.), the Bachelor Program in Business Law for Technical Professions (LL.B.oec.), the Master's Program in Law, Business, Economics and Society (LL.M.) or the PhD Program in Law and Politics (PhD). Specialized research areas, at both the national and international levels, include Human Rights, Democracy, Diversity and Gender, Law and Economics, Southeastern Europe, and Environmental and Energy Law. The Faculty of Law participates in the university's Fields of Excellence Smart Regulation, Climate Change as well as Dimensions of Europeanization.

== Structure ==
The Faculty of Law is divided into ten departments:

- Civil Law, Foreign Private Law and Private International Law
- Civil Procedure and Insolvency Law
- Corporate and International Commercial Law
- Criminal Law, Criminal Procedure Law and Criminology
- European Law
- International Law and International Relations
- Labour Law and Social Security Law
- Public Law and Political Science
- Tax and Fiscal Law
- Foundations of Law

In addition, the Faculty of Law is home to the following centers:

- Center for Austrian and European Higher Education Law and Governance
- Centre for East European Law and Eurasian Studies (CEELES) - Центр восточно-европейского права
- Centre of European Private Law (CEPL)
- European Training and Research Centre for Human Rights and Democracy of the University of Graz (UNI-ETC)
- Research Center for Climate Law (ClimLaw: Graz)
- Graz Jurisprudence
- Cross-faculty Centre for Southeast European Studies (CSEES)

== History ==
1 January 1585 is considered the founding date of the University of Graz. Charles II Francis of Austria, Archduke of Inner Austria, established it as a Jesuit university and entrusted it to the Societas Jesu. At that time, only the faculties of Theology and Philosophy existed: attempts to establish a Faculty of Law failed because of the Jesuits, that until the abolition of their order in 1773, successfully prevented the creation of new faculties, most notably the faculty of law and medicine. Their concerns were not only of a financial nature, but rather about a potential loss of status of the faculties of Theology and Philosophy within the university.

Law teaching in Styria can be traced back to 1566: law was taught in the Protestant Agricultural Schools until 1598. At the beginning of the 17th century, discussions arose on adding a faculty of law to the University of Graz. The Bishop of Lavant, Georg Stobaeus, suggested to start the negotiations, which, however, remained unsuccessful. When, in 1648 another attempt to create a Faculty of Law failed, the Styrian estates took over the teaching of law until 1778 and paid a professor iuris, Balthasar Winckler. Winkler was solely responsible for legal instruction for more than two academic years. Since there was no lecture hall at the university, classes took place in his private apartment. Beginning in 1761, demands for a "formal juridical study" resurfaced. The first epoch of the University of Graz ended with the abolition of the Jesuit Order on 19 August 1773. The university was put under state custodianship and entered into its second, more eventful period, which lasted until 1848.

The Faculty of Law was established on 30 May 1778, by court decree (Gubernal-Intimat of 23 June) about the Overall organization of the university and the unification of legal studies into a public juridical study with two professors (Winkler and Tiller) in two yearly courses.

Four years later, in 1782, the University of Graz was transformed into a Lyceum - thus demoting the institution into a basic teaching institution. This understanding of university education was already anchored at the University of Graz and was the reason why only two professors decided to join the Faculty of Law for the first year 1778/79: Balthasar Winckler, the former local law professor, taught digests, criminal law and offered practical introduction to current provincial laws. The former Jesuit Franz Alois Tiller taught natural law, legal history, institutions as well as international and feudal law. The law curriculum was designed for a duration of two years.

The study reform of 1810 by the Graz-born jurist Franz von Zeiller expanded the duration of legal studies to four years. In the course catalog, the following subjects were listed: "In the first year, the encyclopedic introduction to juridical and political studies, philosophical (or natural) law, criminal law, statistics and religious studies. The second year included Roman law, ecclesiastical law, and the teaching of agriculture, which was obligatory until 1814 for those hearing the law." In the third year, Austrian private law, feudal law, commercial law, and the law of bills of exchange were taught; "political sciences", principles of law, procedural law, and business style made up the content of the fourth year of study.

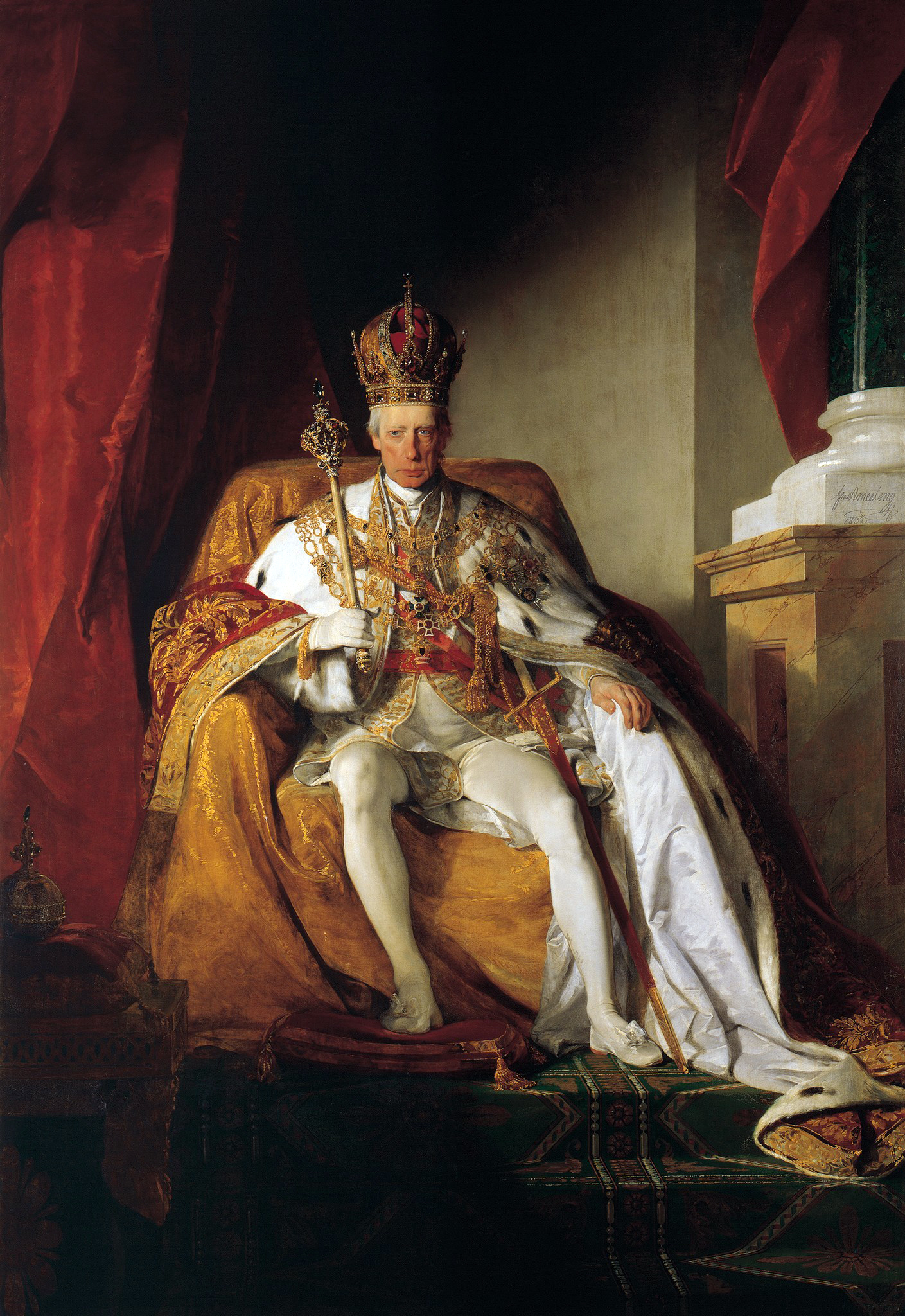
Emperor Franz I approved the re-establishment of the University of Graz under the name Universitas Carola-Franciscea

On 26 January 1827, Emperor Franz I approved the re-establishment of the University of Graz under the name Universitas Carola-Franciscea. The Faculty of Law, that now counted five professors, received the right to award doctorates.

The revolution of 1848 significantly influenced the University of Graz and its Faculty of Law, paving the way toward our modern understanding of university. Compared to Vienna, the revolutionary spark at the University of Graz did not really strike; the Slovene students of the Faculty of Law, for example, demanded lectures in Slovene, that were granted until 1854.

The main innovations of the Faculty of Law however did not take place immediately after the Revolution, but only in the second half of the 19th century: in 1859 there were even rumors that the university would be abolished or transformed into an Academy of Law.

The Organizational Act of 1848 (which initially had only provisional character and provided for the creation of faculties) was made definitive in 1873: the faculties developed into constitutive elements of the university. The Organizational Act of 1873 was renewed in 1922, slightly modified in 1955, and was in force until 1975, when the Faculty of Law and Political Science was divided into an independent Faculty of Law and an independent Faculty of Social and Economic Sciences. Even before this division, 30 institutes with 35 full professors formed the institutional and intellectual backbone of the faculty.

The University Organization Act (UOG) 1975 was followed by the UOG 1993, which provided the preliminary stage for the development of universities into fully autonomous institutions. In 2002, the UOG was replaced by the UG 2002: the autonomy of Austrian universities was achieved. The Faculty of Law at that time comprised twelve institutes.

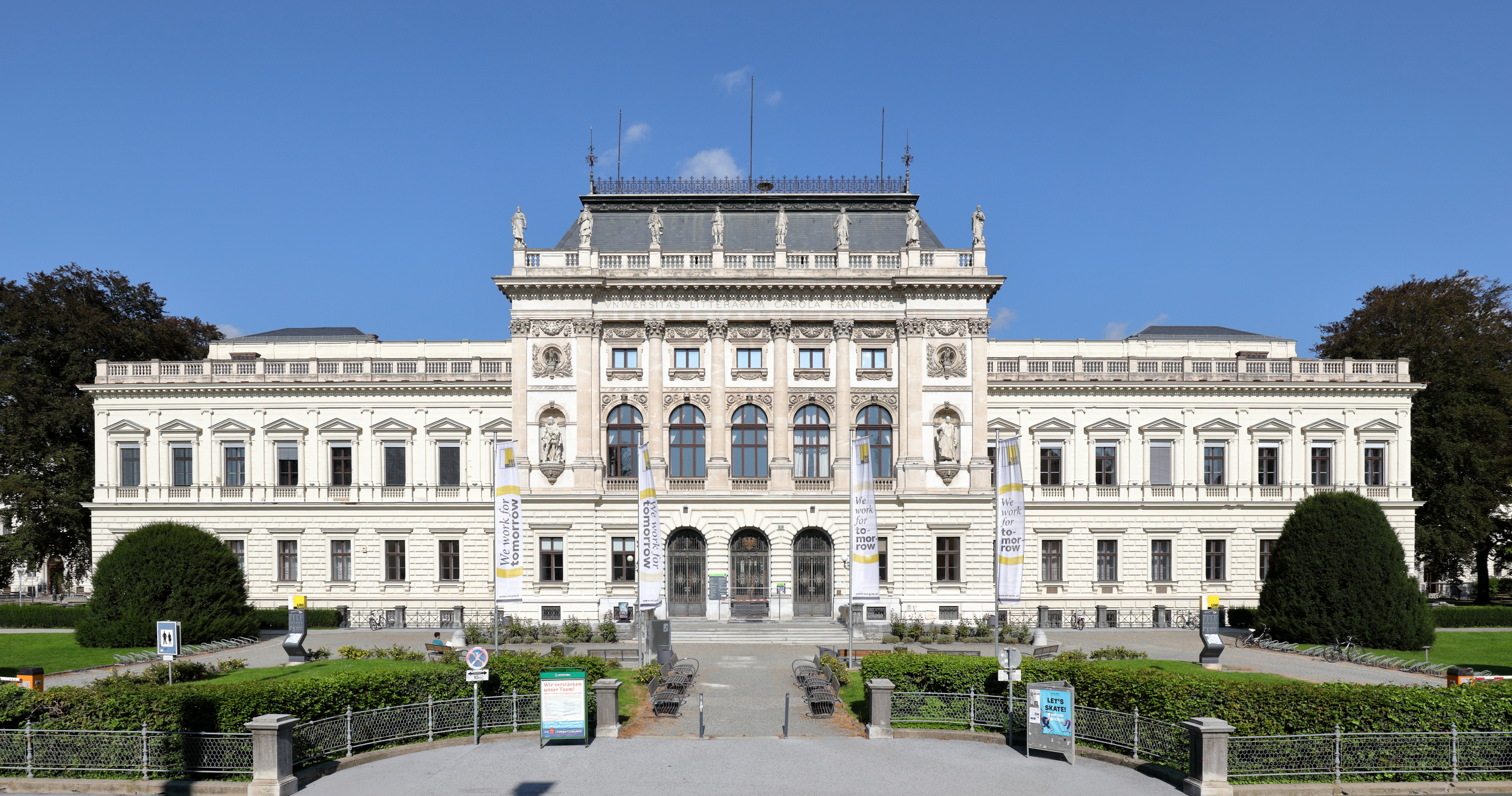
Main building of the University of Graz

The most significant curricular change in the history of the Faculty of Law were the "Study and State Examination Regulations" issued by Minister of Education Leo von Thun-Hohenstein on 2 October 1855. It established three academic fields - law, social sciences and economics - at the Faculty of Law

This reform broke the dominance of natural law and set the focus of legal studies on legal history. Accordingly, in the first year, students were examined in German Imperial and Legal History in conjunction with Austrian History, among other subjects. Only in the second year Austrian private law was taught; criminal law and criminal procedural law were taught in the third year, and in the fourth Austrian civil procedural law, Austrian commercial law and the law of bills of exchange, Austrian statistics and political science.

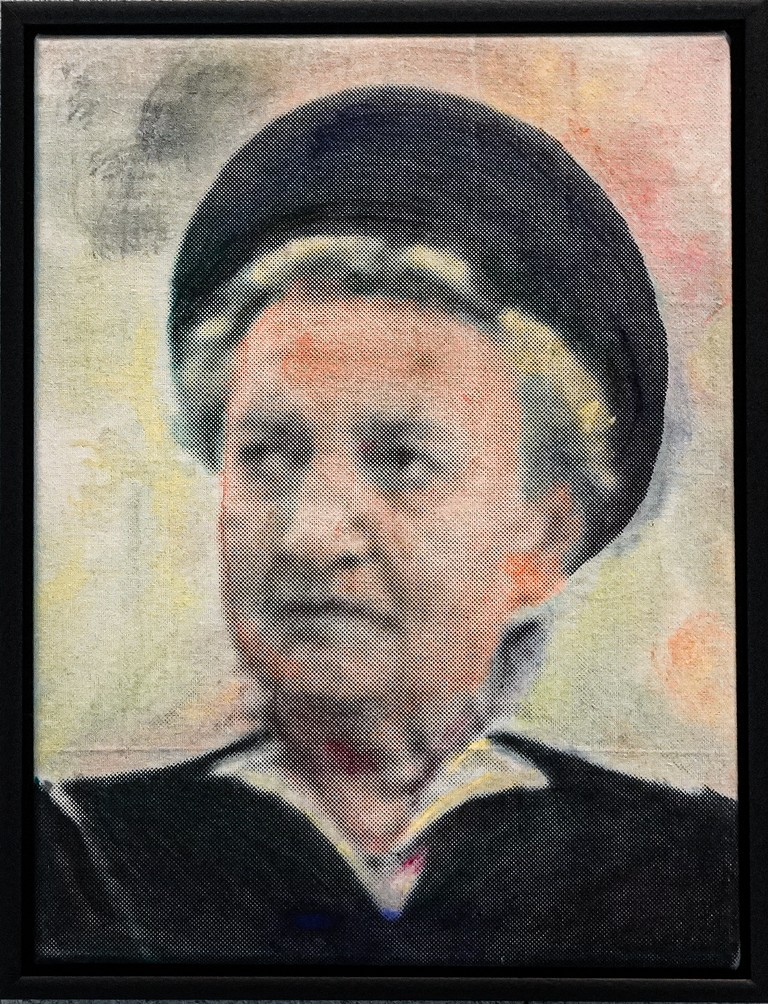
Portrait of Leopoldine Schmidt, the first female graduate of the faculty (Artist: Ophelia Reuter)

This reform set the course for the further development of law, social sciences and economics as academic disciplines in the following century and a half. The modified legal regulations of 15 April 1872, remained in force in an amended version until 30 September 1995. In 1935 the curriculum was divided into three parts of three semesters each. These three sections corresponded to the three state examinations to be taken in addition to final viva voce examinations. In 1919, political science was introduced as a subject with its own doctoral degree.

In April 1919, women were allowed to enroll in law and political science; Leopoldine Schmidt was the first woman to receive a doctorate in law, on 14 July 1923; Johanna Kodolitsch-Beer was the first woman to receive a doctorate in political science, on 19 December 1925. After 1945, the legal history section was reduced from three to two semesters, and towards the end of the 20th century, legal history was again significantly reduced in favor of new subjects such as European law.

Also in 1919, the Minister of Education Otto Glöckel determined that professors at Austria's law faculties should no longer be appointed for a specific subject, but only for "legal sciences". This can be explained by the fact that subjects were clearly delimited vis-à-vis other sub-fields, and professors were assigned to teach in other fields beyond their original field of expertise. Glöckel had now put a stop to this peculiarity of the Faculty of Law. The exclusive appointment as professors of law continued well after 1945, thus increasing flexibility in teaching. On the other hand, this had the consequence that for a long time important subjects did not have their own chair, because the coverage of teaching had already been taken care of.

On the morning of 12 March 1938, the management of clinics and institutes changed within hours: after the resignation of Rector Josef Dobretsberger, Prorector Adolf Zauner took over until Hans Reichelt was installed as the new Rector on 30 March 1938. In the Senate meeting of 17 March 1938, Zauner requested for the Führer to take over the patronage of University of Graz and "allow it to bear the title of Adolf Hitler University". The request was rejected.

The Faculty of Law was not spared from personnel changes either; here too, immediately after Austria's annexation by Nazi Germany, almost all faculty members were replaced by National Socialists.

Among those persons was, for example, Dean Adolf Lenz, a widely recognized professor of criminal law and criminal procedure and successor of Hans Gross. He was dismissed because of his adherence to the Dollfuß-Schuschnigg regime, and succeeded by Ernst Seelig, who joined the NSDAP in 1941.

The former Rector of the University of Graz and Minister of Social Affairs Josef Dobretsberger, Professor of Political Economy, was also immediately dismissed because of his membership, and the same fate befell Wilhelm Taucher. Taucher was not only professor of national economy, but also minister of trade in the interwar period and later went on to become commissioner of the Marshall Plan. The private law scholar Georg Hendel was dismissed because he was Jewish; among the students of law and political science in the winter semester 1937/38, three were practicing Jews. In the summer semester of 1938, only one of them was still enrolled at the faculty. In terms of structural and institutional changes, the Faculty of Law was the least affected compared to the other faculties: Efforts had been made to expand economics and business administration, and the Institute of Criminology was restored.

As early as 30 May 1945, the Provisional Government of Styria issued the order to start lectures "as well as the other academic and teaching operations" immediately. By the end of June 1945, three faculty members were entrusted by the Dean with taking up teaching and heading the departments at the Faculty of Law.

== ReSoWi ==
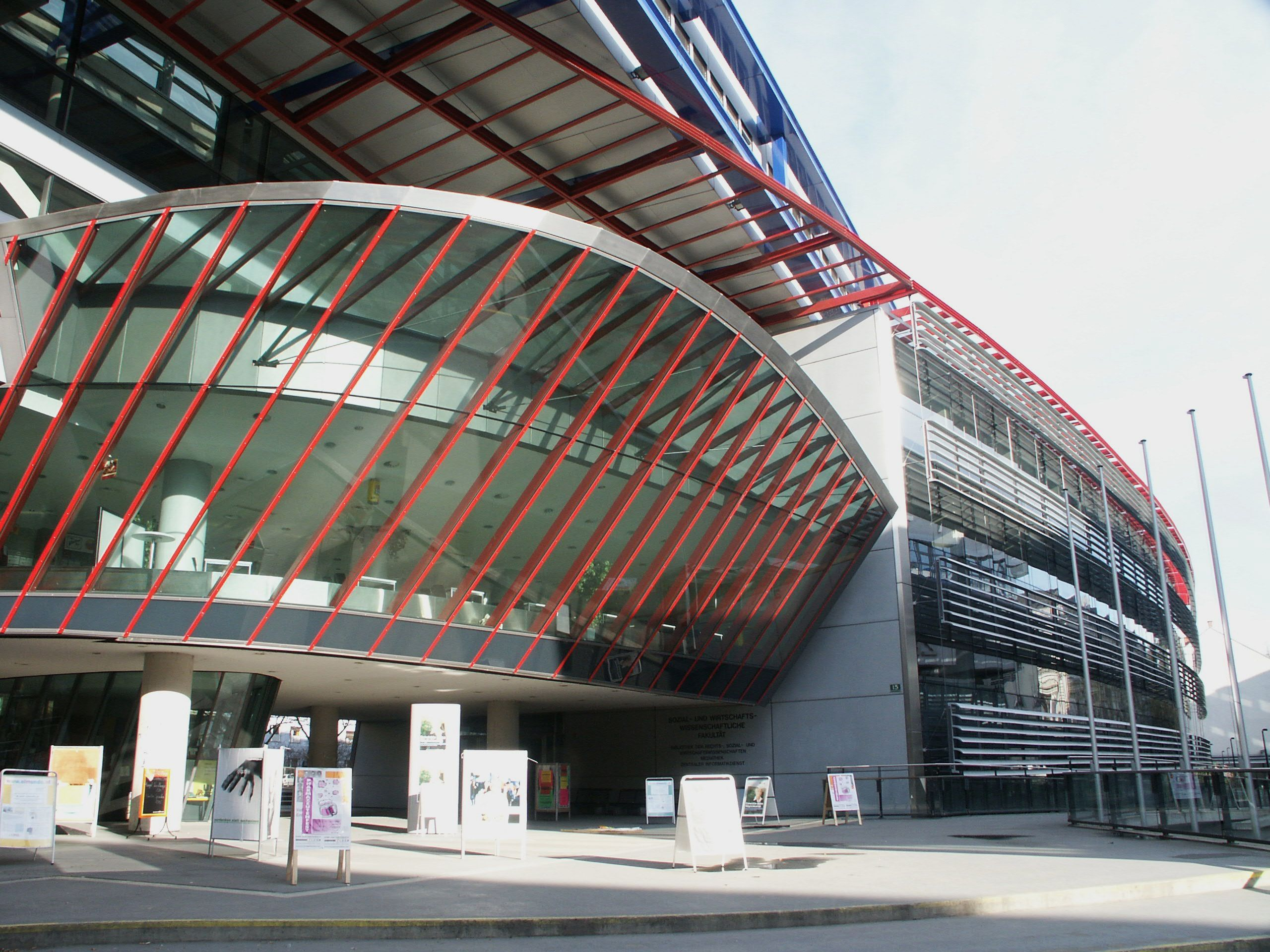
ReSoWi building

Since its foundation, the Faculty of Law was located in the rooms of the old university (today used as representation rooms by the province of Styria) at the corner of Bürgergasse and Hofgasse. Until 1996 it was located in the main building of the University of Graz, which had been solemnly dedicated on 4 June 1895, with many departments spread over the campus and the city center. In the early 1970s, discussions began regarding a new building for the Faculty of Law and Political Science; on 7 March 1994, the official groundbreaking ceremony took place, and on 1 June 1996, the first departments moved into the ReSoWi Center. The 1.2 billion Schilling ReSoWi building was constructed in 30 months, it is almost 300 meters long and about 50 meters wide. It is the largest university construction project in Styria since the construction of the main building.

== Notable people ==
=== Notable researchers ===
- Hans Gross (1847–1915), criminologist
- Friedrich Bernhard Christian Maassen (1823–1900), canon lawyer
- Adalbert Theodor Michel (1821–1877), jurist and politician
- Rudolf von Scherer (1845–1918), canon lawyer
- Josef Schumpeter (1883–1950), national economist and politician
- Franz Ritter von Liszt (1851–1919), criminal lawyer
- Ota Weinberger (1919–2009), legal philosopher

=== Notable alumni ===
- Christopher Drexler, Governor of Styria
- Eva Glawischnig-Piesczek, Spokeswoman of the Green Party
- Irmgard Griss, president of the Supreme Court of Justice (Austria) and member to the National Council (Austria)
- Franz Harnoncourt, CEO of the Kastner & Öhler department store
- Valentin Inzko, European Union Special Representative for Bosnia and Herzegovina
- Claudia Kahr, judge of the Austrian Constitutional Court
- Dieter Kalt Sr., presented Austria in the Ice Hockey World Championships and Winter Olympic Games
- Beatrix Karl, member of the National Council (Austria) and Minister of Justice (Austria)
- Gerald Klug, Austian Minister of Transport, Innovation and Minister of Defense and Sports and Technology
- Jörg Leichtfried, Austrian State Secretary at the Federal Ministry of the Interior and Minister of Transport, Innovationand Technology
- Reinhold Lopatka, Member of the European Parliament for Austria and member of the National Council (Austria)
- Helmut Marko, racing driver and motorsport executive
- Alois Stadlober, cross-country skier who competed at the 1999 FIS Nordic World Ski Championships and the Winter Olympics
- Bettina Vollath, Member of the European Parliament
