= Everything which is not forbidden is allowed =

Constitutional principle

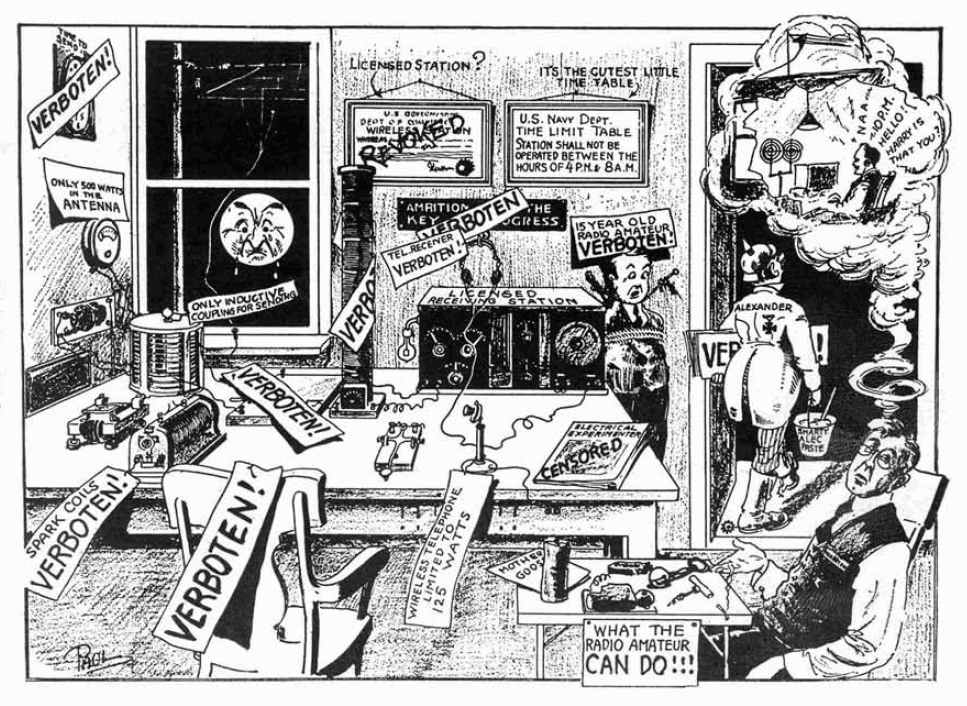
A cartoon in Hugo Gernsback's Electrical Experimenter lampooning proposed regulations to make radio a monopoly of the US Navy

"Everything which is not forbidden is allowed" is a legal maxim. It is the concept that any action can be taken unless there is a law against it. It is also known in some situations as the "general power of competence" whereby the body or person being regulated is acknowledged to have competent judgement of their scope of action.

The opposite principle, "everything which is not allowed is forbidden", states that an action can only be taken if it is specifically allowed.

A senior English judge, Sir John Laws, stated the principles as: "For the individual citizen, everything which is not forbidden is allowed; but for public bodies, and notably government, everything which is not allowed is forbidden." Legal philosopher Ota Weinberger put it this way: "In a closed system in which all obligations are stated explicitly the following inference rules are valid: (XI) Everything which is not forbidden is allowed".

== Domestic law ==
=== Czech Republic ===
The Czech constitution, Article 2, paragraphs 2 and 3, respectively read:

(2) The power of the state serves all citizens and can be only applied in cases, under limitations and through uses specified by a law. (3) Every citizen can do anything that is not forbidden by the law, and no one can be forced to do anything that is not required by a law.

The same principles are reiterated in the Czech Bill of Rights, Article 2.

=== Germany ===
Within the German legal system, it is often argued that a particular legal concept must be explicitly stated by a law in order for that concept to be applicable. It is not considered required for the law to explicitly state that the concept does not exist. An example for this is the concept of Nebenbesitz (indirect possession of a right by more than one person), which is denied by German courts with the argument that §868 of the Civil Code, which defines indirect possession, does not say there could be two people possessing. This principle does not extend to prohibiting doing anything which is not mentioned in law however, as the German constitution Art. 2(1) protects the general freedom to act (Allgemeine Handlungsfreiheit), as demonstrated e.g. by the judgment of the Federal Constitutional Court known as Reiten im Walde (BVerfGE 80, 137; lit. "riding in the forest").

=== United Kingdom ===
In the United Kingdom, the Ram Doctrine is a former constitutional doctrine based upon a 1945 memorandum by Granville Ram. Part of it reads:

A Minister of the Crown is not in the same position as a statutory corporation. A statutory corporation (whether constituted by a special statute as, for instance, a railway company is, or constituted under the Companies Acts as in the case of an ordinary company) is entirely a creature of statute and has no powers except those conferred upon it by or under statute, but a Minister of the Crown, even though there may have been a statute authorising his appointment, is not a creature of statute and may, as an agent of the Crown, exercise any powers which the Crown has power to exercise, except so far as he is precluded from doing so by statute. In other words, in the case of a Government Department, one must look at the statutes to see what it may not do, not as in the case of a company to see what it may do.

The doctrine is also mentioned in Halsbury's Laws of England (though not explicitly by name) and the Cabinet Manual.

In R v Secretary of State for Health, ex parte C [2000] 1 FLR 627, it was found that, despite the fact that the Department of Health (as it was then known) had no statutory authority to maintain an unpublished but consulted (by employers in the child care field) database, it was not unlawful for it do so.

A 2013 report of the House of Lords' Constitution Committee noted that the book De Smith's Judicial Review is critical of the doctrine, and suggests that Ram's memorandum is not an accurate depiction of the law today and that the phrase "the Ram doctrine" is inaccurate and should no longer be used.

==== Local authorities in England ====
The converse principle—"everything which is not allowed is forbidden"—used to apply to public authorities in England, whose actions were limited to the powers explicitly granted to them by law. The restrictions on local authorities were lifted by the Localism Act 2011 which granted a "general power of competence" to local authorities.

==== Coronavirus pandemic ====
In March 2021, in response to coronavirus disease 2019, Health Secretary Matt Hancock reportedly advised Prime Minister Boris Johnson in the following terms: "We've got to tell people that they can't do anything unless it is explicitly allowed by law." This advice has been described as a "radical suggestion", and Hancock himself reportedly described it as Napoleonic, "flipping" British tradition, because in lockdown people would be forbidden from doing anything unless the legislation said, in terms, that they could. While the foregoing is merely reported, the Coronavirus Act 2020 and hundreds of pieces of subordinate legislation made pursuant to that Act prima facie abrogated the principle in the United Kingdom. This has been confirmed by other writers including Adam Wagner, a barrister specialising in human rights and public law. Lord Sumption, a former judge of the Supreme Court, stated in a lecture given on 27 October 2020 that "The ease with which people could be terrorized into surrendering basic freedoms which are fundamental to our existence as social beings came as a shock to me in March 2020".

=== United States ===
In the US, similar restrictions on municipal authorities apply as a consequence of Dillon's rule.

== International law ==
In international law, the principle is known as the Lotus principle, after a collision of the S.S. Lotus in international waters. The Lotus case of 1926–1927 established the freedom of sovereign states to act as they wished, unless they chose to bind themselves by a voluntary agreement or there was an explicit restriction in international law.

== Derived principles and sayings ==
The totalitarian principle in physics adapts the phrase to read: "Everything not forbidden is compulsory."

The Robert Heinlein 1940 short story "Coventry" uses a similar phrase to describe an authoritarian state: "Anything not compulsory was forbidden". The 1958 version of T. H. White's The Once and Future King describes the slogan of an ant-hill as being "Everything not forbidden is compulsory".

A jocular saying is that, in England, "everything which is not forbidden is allowed", while in Germany, the opposite applies, so "everything which is not allowed is forbidden". This may be extended to France—"everything is allowed even if it is forbidden".

== See also ==
- Entick v Carrington
- Exception that proves the rule
- Kompetenz-kompetenz
- Legal certainty
- Nulla poena sine lege, no penalty without a law
- Reserved powers
- Rule of law
- Tenth Amendment to the United States Constitution, the principle of federalism and states' rights
- Vagueness doctrine
- Everything not forbidden is compulsory, the totalitarian principle in physics
- Air Bud (series)
