= Totalitarian principle =

Quantum mechanics principle stating: "Everything not forbidden is compulsory"

In quantum mechanics, the totalitarian principle states: "Everything not forbidden is compulsory." Physicists including Murray Gell-Mann borrowed this expression, and its satirical reference to totalitarianism, from the popular culture of the early twentieth century.

The statement refers to a surprising feature of particle interactions: that any interaction that is not forbidden by a small number of simple conservation laws is not only allowed, but must be included in the sum over all "paths" that contribute to the outcome of the interaction. Hence if it is not forbidden, there is some probability amplitude for it to happen.

In the many-worlds interpretation of quantum mechanics, the principle has a more literal meaning: that every possibility at every interaction that is not forbidden by such a conservation law will actually happen (in some branch of the wave function).

== Origin of the phrase ==
Neither the phrase nor its application to quantum physics originated with Gell-Mann, but a 1956 paper by him contains the first published use of the phrase as a description of quantum physics. Gell-Mann used it to describe the state of particle physics around the time he was formulating the Eightfold Way, a precursor to the quark-model of hadrons. According to the second edition of Strange Beauty: Murray Gell-Mann & the Revolution in Physics Gell-Mann incorrectly attributed the quote to George Orwell in a letter to the astrophysicist Jeremiah Ostriker.

Formulations close to Gell-Mann's are used in T. H. White's 1958 (not 1938–39) version of The Once and Future King, Jack Parsons's 1948 essay "Freedom is a Two-Edged Sword", and Robert Heinlein's 1940 short story "Coventry". They differ in details such as the order of the words "forbidden" and "compulsory", and Gell-Mann's footnote uses the words in both orders, although only one of these orders captures his precise logical meaning. The phrase, and variations on it, appear to have been common in this period, and probably trace back to an older legal principle, that everything which is not forbidden is allowed. Since White did not use the phrase in any published work until two years after Gell-Mann's paper, White cannot have been Gell-Mann's source. It is likely that writers such as White, Heinlein, and Gell-Mann were all simply making use of a phrase that was a part of popular culture at the time.

== See also ==
- Everything which is not forbidden is allowed – Constitutional principle
- Modal realism – Philosophical concept
