= Adalbert Theodor Michel =

Austrian law professor (1821–1877)

- Born: 15 April 1821; Prague, Bohemia, Austrian Empire
- Died: 30 August 1877 (aged 56); Axenfels, Canton of Schwyz, Switzerland

Academic background
- Education: Charles University

Academic work
- Discipline: law
- Institutions: University of Olomouc; University of Graz

Adalbert Theodor Michel (Czech: Vojtěch Theodor Michl; 15 April 1821 – 30 September 1877) was an Austrian lawyer, law professor and rector of Universities in Olomouc (1854) and in Graz (1867).

== Biography ==
Michel graduated University of Prague as doctor of law in 1844. After graduating he was shortly lecturing at the Universities in Prague and Vienna. Since 1847 he was lecturing at the Kraków University, but by 1849 he was again shortly back at the University in Prague. In 1850 he obtained professorship at the Olomouc University Faculty of Law. He became the rector of the University of Olomouc in 1854. Shortly thereafter the Faculty of Law was closed as retribution for Olomouc's students and professors support for democratization and the Czech National Revival in 1848 and Michel went to lecture private and railway law at the University of Innsbruck in 1858, and since 1860 at the University of Graz. He became the rector of the University of Graz in 1860, and the dean of Graz's Faculty of Law in 1876.

In 1870 Michel became deputy at the Graz town council as well as in the Landtag. There, he was gradually becoming more influential, especially as a member of various committees. Foremost it was the Landtag Committee, which entrusted him with the authority of evaluation of bill proposals and of cultural happenings.

== Selected works ==
- Die Darstellung der Gewährleistung nach dem österreichischen Privatrechte, Prague 1849.
- Sammlung der neuesten auf das österreichische Allgemeine Privatrecht sich beziehenden Gesetze und Verordnungen, Prague 1850. (second issue 1861)
- Handbuch des allg. Privatrechtes für das Kaiserthum Österr., Olomouc 1853 (second broadened issue 1856)
- Grundriss des heutigen österreischischen allgemeinen Privatrechtes, Olomouc 1856
- Österreichs Eisebahnrecht, Vienna 1860
- Landesgesetze des Herzogthums Steiermark, Graz 1867
- Beitrr. zur Geschichte des österr. Eherechtes, Graz (two volumes)
- Various articles in Magazin für Rechts- und Staatswissenschaften
