= Claudia Kahr =

Austrian judge (born 1955)

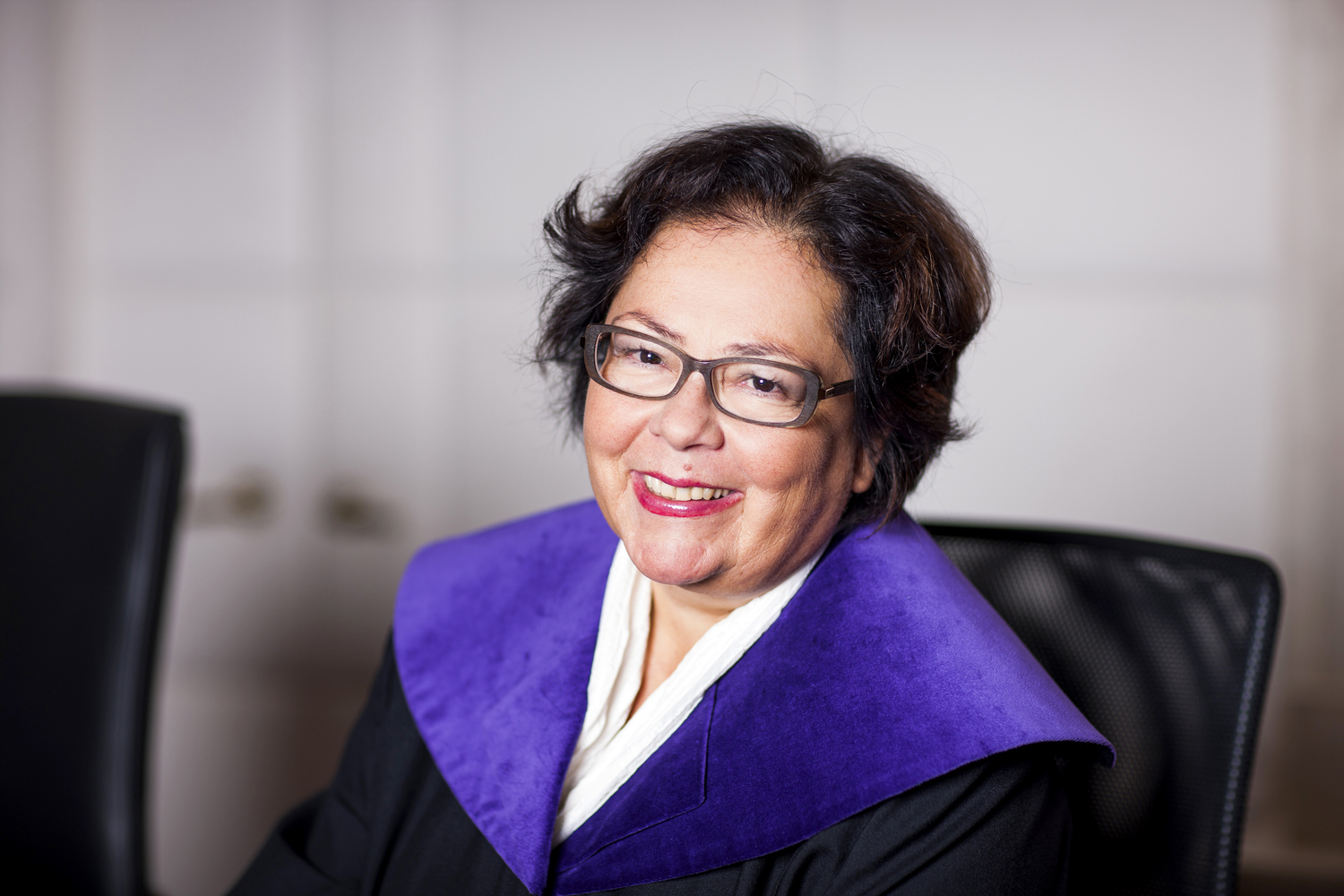
- Kahr in 2012

Judge of the Austrian Constitutional Court
- Incumbent
- Assumed office 1999

Personal details
- Born: 30 September 1955 (age 71) Graz, Austria
- Education: University of Graz (Dr. iur.)

Claudia Kahr (born 30 September 1955, in Graz) has been a judge at the Austrian Constitutional Court since 1999. Following law studies at the University of Graz, she received her Doctor of Law degree in 1978, and attended the College of Europe during the 1978–1979 academic year. From June 23, 2010, to December 15, 2017, Claudia Kahr also served as the chairwoman of the supervisory board of the state-owned ASFINAG Holding.
