= Madlyn M. Kahr =

American art historian (1913–2004)

Madlyn Millner Kahr
- Born: Madlyn Millner; June 30, 1913; New Jersey, United States
- Died: February 24, 2004 (aged 90); Providence, Rhode Island, United States
- Other names: MM Kahr, Madlyn M. Kahr, Madlyn Kahr
- Education: Barnard College (BA), New York University Institute of Fine Arts (MA, PhD)
- Occupations: Art historian, scholar, educator
- Known for: 16th–17th century Dutch, Spanish, and Venetian painting, feminist art history
- Notable work: Dutch Painting In The Seventeenth Century (1982)
- Spouse: Sidney Kahr (m. 1936–1975; death)
- Children: 2

Madlyn Millner Kahr (née Madlyn Millner; 1913–2004) was an American art historian and educator. She specialized in the study of 16th–17th century painting of Dutch, Spanish, and Venetian origins, and feminist art history. Kahr was professor emeritus at the University of California, San Diego. She authored the books, Velázquez: The Art of Painting (1976), and Dutch Painting In The Seventeenth Century (1982).

== Early life and education ==
Madlyn Millner was born on June 30, 1913, in New Jersey, U.S.. She studied at Barnard College in New York City, and received a B.A. degree in 1933. While attending undergrad, she served as the editor of Barnard Bulletin, the school newspaper. Kahr followed with further study at New York University Institute of Fine Arts where she received a M.A. degree and PhD. Her dissertation was titled, The Book Of Esther In Seventeenth-Century Dutch Art (1968, New York University).

In 1936, she married psychiatrist Sidney Kahr, they had two children.

== Career ==
Kahr was a professor at the University of California, San Diego, starting in 1976. She also made watercolor paintings, and in 1980 she participated in a UCSD faculty group exhibition. Kahr also taught at Manhattanville College, Columbia University, CUNY Queens College, and Stanford University.

She wrote on artists, including Rembrandt, Vermeer, and Velázquez; and also wrote about female archetypes in art, such as Delilah, and Danaë. In the book Feminism And Art History (1982), the chapter Delilah by Kahr used an iconographic approach when reviewing male artists' treatment of the Delilah theme in their work, which demonstrated stereotypes of women.

She was a member of the Women's Caucus for Art in 1979. In advanced age she lived at Epoch Assisted Living in Providence, Rhode Island; where died on February 24, 2004, at the age of 90.

== Bibliography ==
- Kahr, Madlyn (1965). "A Rembrandt Problem: Haman or Uriah?". Journal of the Warburg and Courtauld Institutes. 28: 258–273. doi:10.2307/750673. ISSN 0075-4390. JSTOR 750673.
- Kahr, Madlyn (1966). "Rembrandt's Esther A Painting and an Etching newly interpreted and dated". Oud Holland. 81 (4): 228–244. doi:10.1163/187501766X00360. ISSN 0030-672X. JSTOR 42710767.
- Kahr, Madlyn Millner (1968). The Book Of Esther In Seventeenth-Century Dutch Art (dissertation). New York City, New York: New York University.
- Kahr, Madlyn Millner (1972). "Vermeer's 'Girl Asleep': A Moral Emblem". Metropolitan Museum Journal. 6: 115–132. doi:10.2307/1512637. ISSN 0077-8958. JSTOR 1512637.
- Kahr, Madlyn Millner (June 1975). "Velázquez and Las Meninas". The Art Bulletin. 57 (2): 225–246. doi:10.1080/00043079.1975.10787153. ISSN 0004-3079.
- Kahr, Madlyn Millner (1976). Velázquez: The Art of Painting. New York City: Harper & Row. ISBN 978-0064335751.
- Kahr, Madlyn Millner (March 1978). "Danaë: Virtuous, Voluptuous, Venal Woman". The Art Bulletin. 60 (1): 43–55. doi:10.1080/00043079.1978.10787514. ISSN 0004-3079.
- Kahr, Madlyn Millner (September 1980). "Velázquez's Las Hilanderas: A New Interpretation". The Art Bulletin. 62 (3): 376–385. doi:10.1080/00043079.1980.10787789. ISSN 0004-3079.
- Kahr, Madlyn Millner (1982). Dutch Painting In The Seventeenth Century. New York City: Harper & Row. ISBN 978-0064300872.
- Kahr, Madlyn Millner (1982), "Delilah", in Broude, Norma; Garrard, Mary D. (eds.), Feminism And Art History, Routledge, pp. 118–145, doi:10.4324/9780429500534-8, ISBN 978-0-429-50053-4
- Kahr, Madlyn Millner (1982). "Women as Artists and "Women's Art"". Woman's Art Journal. 3 (2): 28–31. doi:10.2307/1358031. ISSN 0270-7993. JSTOR 1358031.
- Kahr, Madlyn Millner (June 1, 1982). "Edward A. Snow, 'A Study of Vermeer' (Book Review)". The Art Bulletin. 64 (2). New York City.

== See also ==
- Women in the art history field
