= Friedrich Maassen =

German jurist, professor of law and Roman Catholic scholar

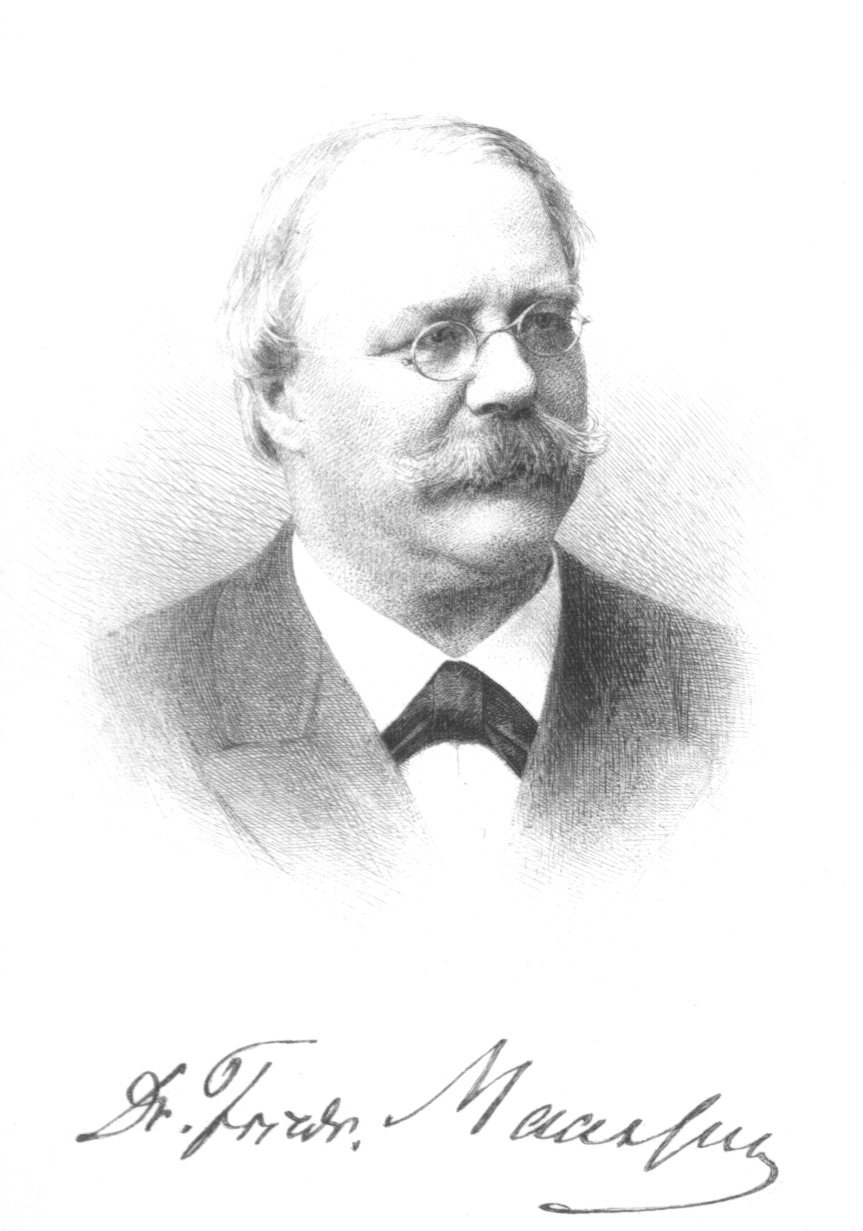
Friedrich Maassen.

Friedrich Bernard Christian Maassen (24 September 1823 – 9 April 1900, age 76) was a German jurist, professor of law, and Roman Catholic scholar.

== Biography ==
Maasen was born in Wismar, Mecklenburg-Schwerin. After studying the humanities in his native city, he studied jurisprudence at Jena, Berlin, Kiel and finally Rostock, where in 1849 as an advocate, he took his degree at the university there in 1851. He was active in the constitutional conflict of 1848 between the Grand Duke of Mecklenburg-Schwerin and the Diet, defending the rights of the representatives in three pamphlets, and, together with Franz von Florencourt, founded the anti-revolutionary "Norddeutscher Korrespondent". Shortly after his graduation he became a convert to Roman Catholicism. Later realizing that, as a Catholic, he was no longer eligible for public office in his native town, he travelled to Bonn, where he devoted himself to academic teaching.

Count Thun, impressed by Maasen's writings, invited him to Pesth in 1855 as professor extraordinarius of Roman Law. Several months later, he was given a professorship of Roman and canon law at Innsbruck, one at Graz in 1860, and one in 1871 at Vienna, where, until he retired in 1894, he attracted many pupils.

In 1873 he became a member of the Vienna Academy of Sciences, in 1885 a life member of the Upper House, and from 1882 until 1897 was a member of the Supreme Court of the Empire. During the Vatican Council he adhered to Ignaz von Döllinger, but was in no real sense an Old Catholic, and in 1882 explicitly retracted all his utterances in favour of that sect.

Maassen was often perceived as an aggressive political tactician. He was an adherent of the so-called Federalismus, and strove energetically for the formation of a Catholic Conservative party in Styria, where he belonged for a time to the Diet.

Maassen died in Wilten near Innsbruck.

== Works ==
Maassen's magnum opus, Der Primat des Bischofs von Rom und die alten Patriarchalkirchen (Bonn, 1853), dealt with two important questions: whether the Roman primacy had existed in the first centuries, and whether the much-discussed sixth canon of the First Council of Nicaea bears witness to the primacy. This work won immediate recognition among scholars.

Incited by Friedrich Carl von Savigny's important work on the history of Roman law in the Middle Ages, Maassen began a history of canon law on the same lines. But of this work, which was to have numbered five volumes, he published only the first, Geschichte der Quellen und der Literatur des kanonischen Rechts im Abendlande bis zum Ausgang des Mittelalters (Graz, 1870). Several of his articles in the Report (Sitzungsberichte) of the Vienna Academy were practically complements of this work, as was his Pseudoisidorstudien (Vienna, 1885).

Maassen's Neun Kapitel über freie Kirche und Gewissenfreiheit (Graz, 1876) is written in a vehement style; a sweeping condemnation of the Prussian Kulturkampf. An amplification of the first chapter appeared under the title Ueber die Gründe des Kampfes zwischen dem heidnischen Staate und dem Christentum (Vienna, 1882).

Maassen also edited one volume of the Monumenta Germaniæ Historica: Leges, III (Hanover, 1893), being the Concilia ævi Merovingensis. Noteworthy, also, is his Zwei Synoden unter Childeric II (Graz, 1867).
