= Ota Weinberger =

Czech-Austrian jurist, legal philosopher, and logician (1909-2009)

PhDr. Ota Weinberger

Personal details
- Born: 20 April 1919 Brno, Czechoslovakia
- Died: 30 January 2009 (aged 89) Graz, Austria
- Education: Masaryk University, Charles University in Prague
- Occupation: Philosopher and Lawyer

Ota Weinberger (20 April 1919 – 30 January 2009) was a Czech-Austrian jurist, legal philosopher, and logician. He was the Professor of Legal Science at the University of Graz and the University of Prague.

== Biography ==
Weinberger was born in Brno, Czechoslovakia on 20 April 1919 into an assimilated Jewish family of intellectuals. He was respected in the professional world as a logician and legal theorist who became known to a broad public beyond the academic framework as a political admonisher. For a long time, he suffered greatly from the political conditions in his homeland. As a Jew, he was first persecuted by the Third Reich. He was initially unable to complete his law studies at Masaryk University in his hometown and spent four years in concentration camps. After the war, he completed his studies and entered the court service.

As a democrat and liberal thinker, he refused to join the Czechoslovak Communist Party and was subsequently repressed by those in power. In the years 1953–1956, he had to work as a locksmith for political reasons. Despite the most adverse circumstances, he managed to embark on an academic career as a Professor at the Charles University in Prague, where he taught logic between 1956 and 1968.

In meantime, he defended his PhD dissertation at the Charles University in Prague named Studie k logice normativních vět: Proč nemá smyslu mluvit o pravdivosti normativních vět. Dvě oblasti logiky normativních vět. Theorie důslekových vztahů a podmíněná normativní věta. Několik poznámek k normativni interpretaci systémů K1 a K2 J. Kalinowského. In 1963, Weinberger became Docent (associate professor) at the same university.

During the Prague Spring in 1968, Weinberger was in Vienna at the World Congress of Philosophy and never returned to his homeland. Only after the collapse of communism was he rehabilitated in the Czech Republic. Weinberger died on 30 January 2009, after a long and serious illness.

== Thoughts ==
In his PhD dissertation, Weinberger defends the applicability of logic to norms or normative propositions respectively. He created a pioneer work of the then-new discipline of deontic logic he preferred the term logic of norms.

== Honours and awards ==
- 1989–1990: Humboldt Prize (Humboldt-Forschungspreis).
- 1989–1990: Gold Medal of Honor of the State of Salzburg (Land Salzburg das Goldene Ehrenzeichen).
- 1993: The University of Salzburg awarded him an honorary doctorate.
- 1994: Member of Academia Europaea.
- 2004: Čestný doktorát or Doctor Honoris Causa (Dr.h.c.) in juridical science at Masaryk University in Brno.

== Bibliography ==
- Kurs logiky pro právníky (1957) – in Czech
- Die Sollsatzproblematik in der modernen Logik (1958) – in German
- Kurz logiky pre právníkov (1959) – in Slovak
- Logika. Učebnice pro právníky (1959) – in Czech
- Logika – vysokoškolský kurs pro právníky (1959) – in Czech
- Rechtslogik (1970) – in German
- Studien zur Normenlogik und Rechtsinformatik (1974) – in German
- Logische Analyse in der Jurisprudenz (1979) – in German
- Normentheorie als Grundlage der Jurisprudenz und Ethik (1981) – in German
- An Institutional Theory of Law: New Approaches to Legal Positivism, with Neil MacCormick, (1986)
- Logik, Semantik, Hermeneutik (1987) – in German
- Recht, Institution und Rechtspolitik. Grundlagen der Rechtstheorie und Sozialphilosophie (1987) – in German
- Norm und Institution. Eine Einführung in die Theorie des Rechts (1988) – in German
- Law, Institution and Legal Politics: Fundamental Problems of Legal Theory and Social Philosophy (1991)
- Moral und Vernunft. Beiträge zu Ethik, Gerechtigkeitstheorie und Normenlogik (1992) – in German
- Filozofie právo, morálka. Problémy praktické filozifie (1993) – in Czech
- Základy právní logiky (1995) – in Czech
- Norma a instituce (1995) – in Czech
- Inštitucionalizmus. Nová teória konania, práva a demokracie (1995) – in Slovak
- Alternative Handlungstheorie. Gleichzeitig eine Auseinandersetzung mit Georg Henrik von Wrights praktischer Philosophie (1996) – in German
- Alternativní teoríe jedmání. Zároveň kritický rozbor praktické filozofie Georga Henrika von Wrighta (1997) – in Czech
- Alternative Action Theory: Simultaneously a Critique of Georg Henrik Von Wright's Practical Philosophy (1998)
- Wahrer Glaube, Agnostizismus und theologische Argumentation (2004) – in German
