= Trei Stejari =

Trei Stejari (English: Three Oaks) is a district near the center of Sibiu, Romania.

The district's name was given by three oaks that were positioned on a crossroad on one of the roads that lead from the old city's citadel. It also houses the now closed beer factory with the same name.
