= Broscărie =

Broscărie is a district located in the eastern part of Sibiu, Romania, next to the eastern industrial area.

The district was built on a drained marshland, during the 1970 communist industrialization program, to house the workers of the industrial area. The buildings are typical communist style apartment buildings.
