= Țiglari =

District of Sibiu, Romania

Țiglari is a district of Sibiu, Romania, situated in the northern part of the city. Its name is given by the former tile factory that was situated in this part of the city.
