= Sibiu =

City in Romania

Sibiu Hermannstadt (German)
- County seat and Municipality
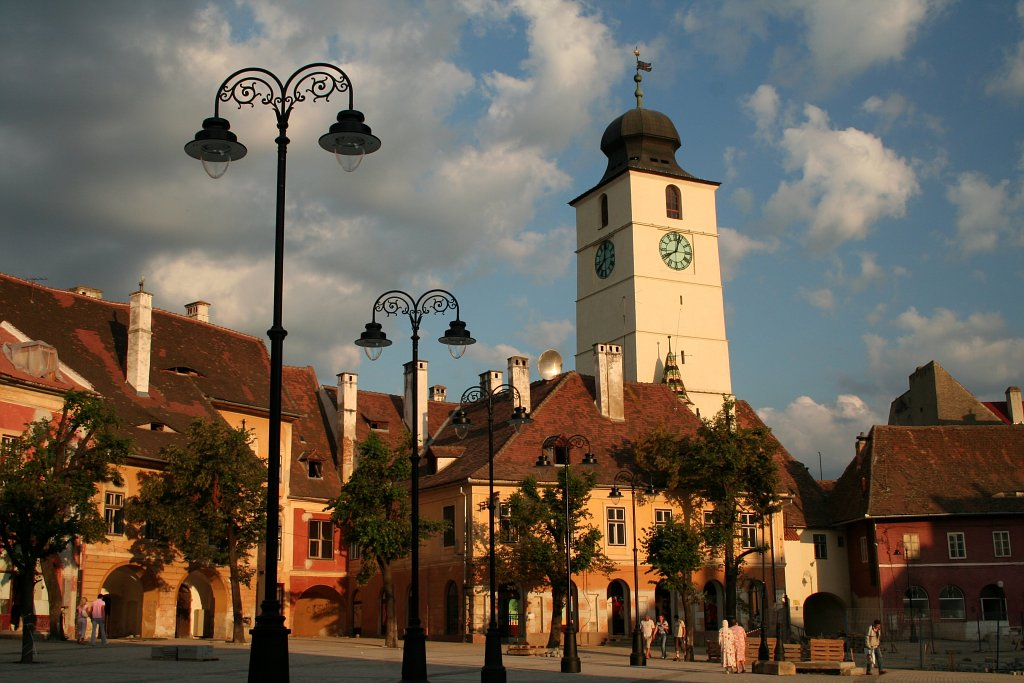
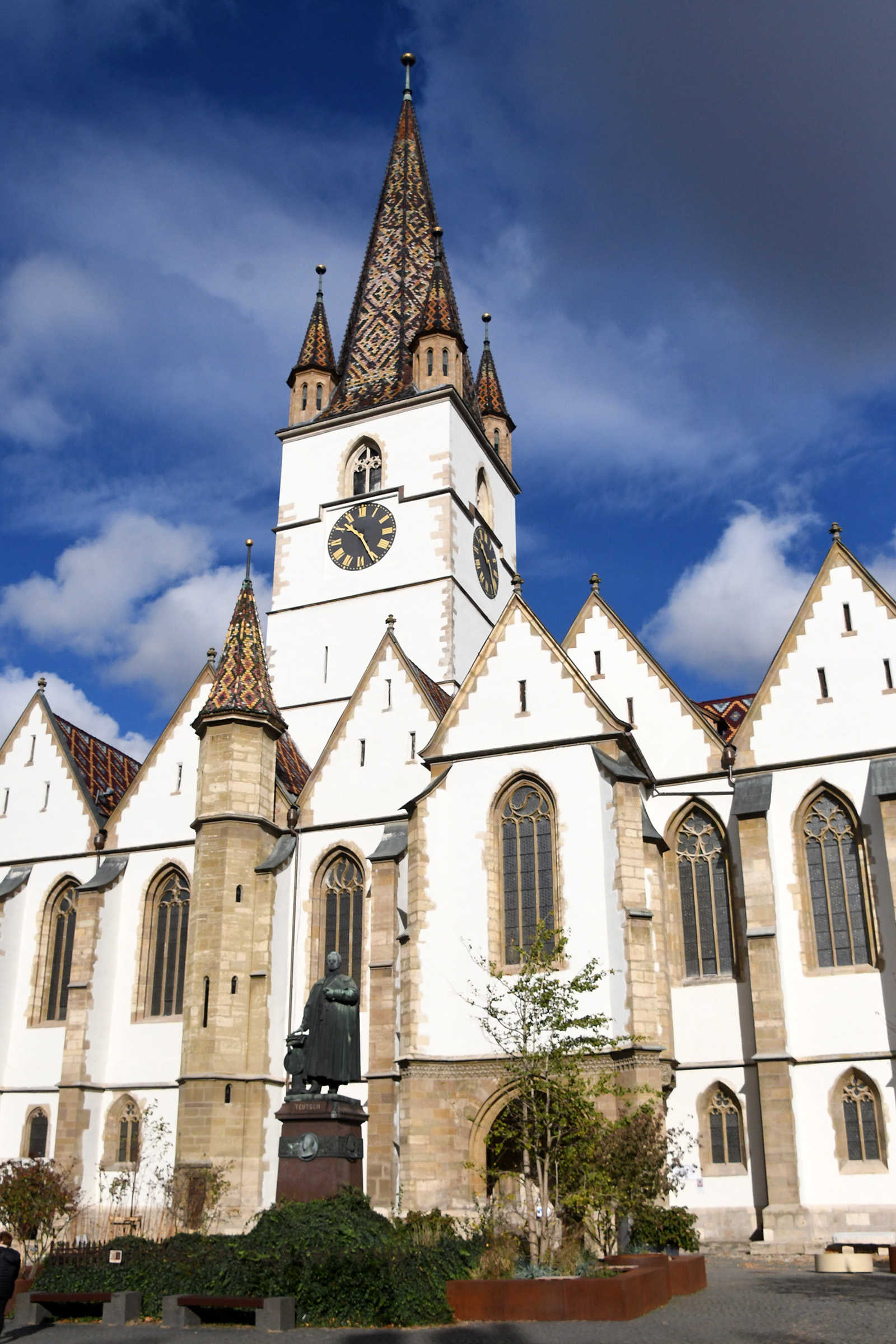
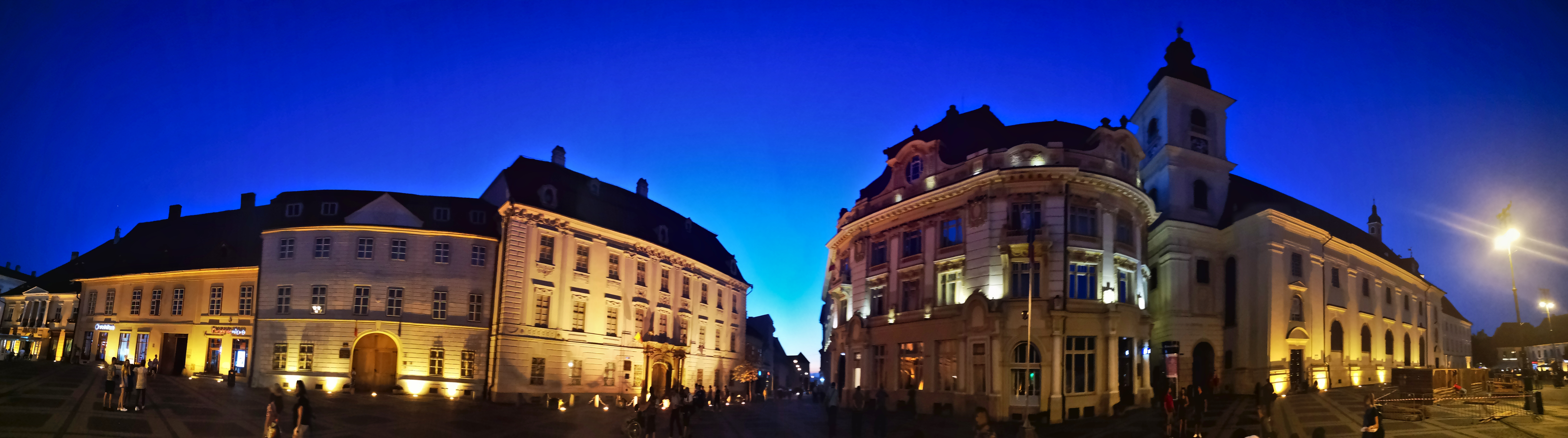
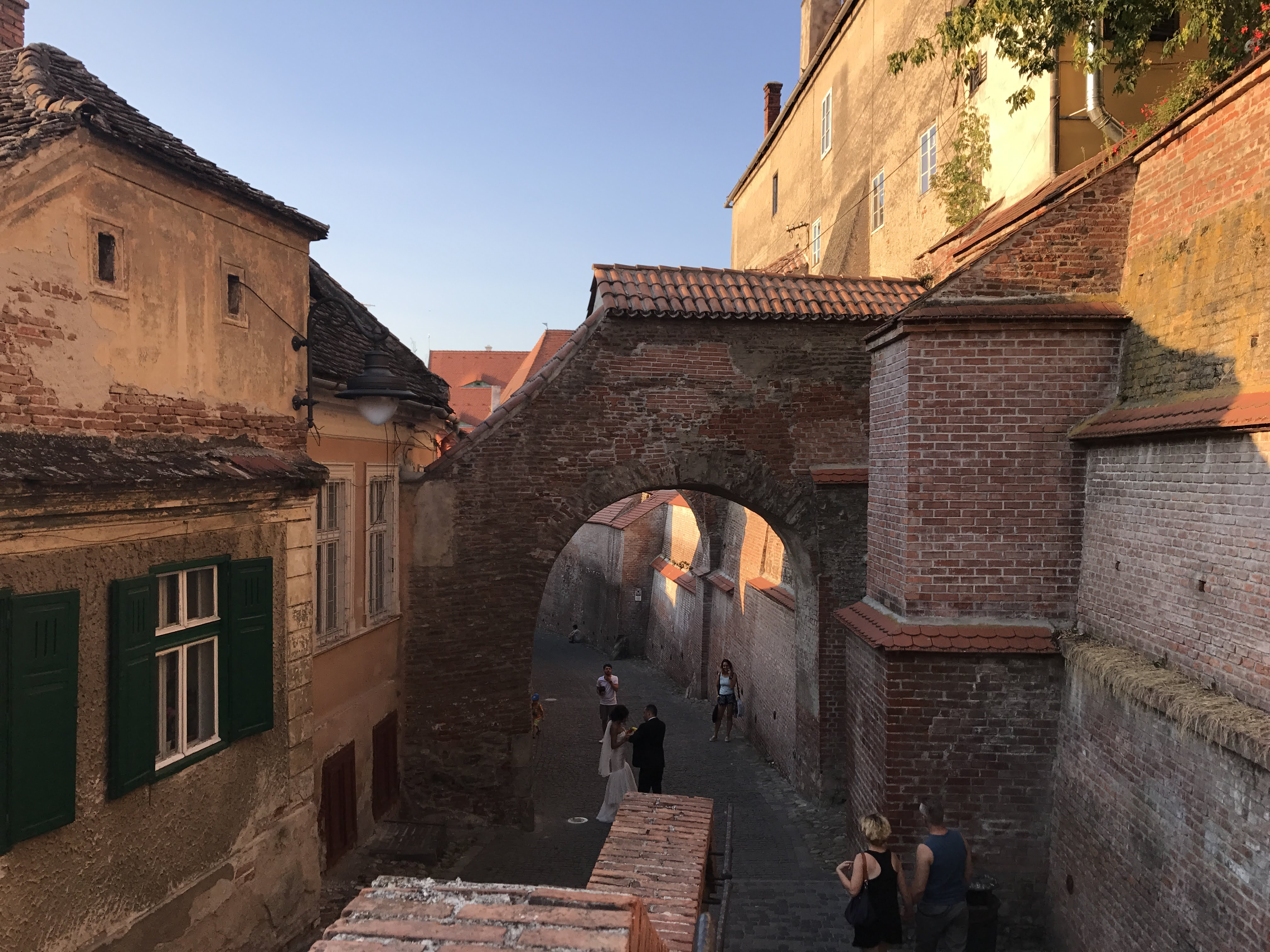
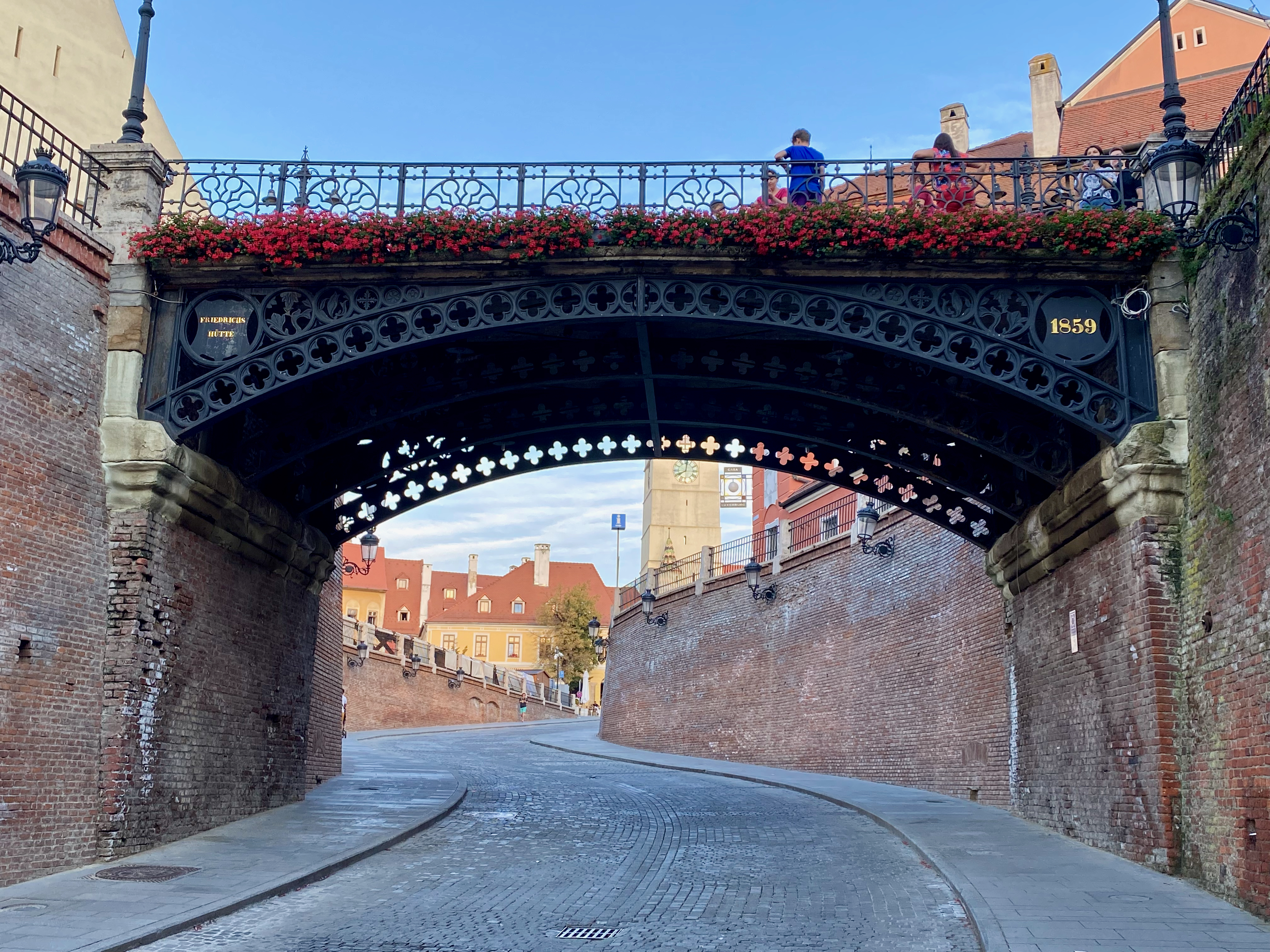
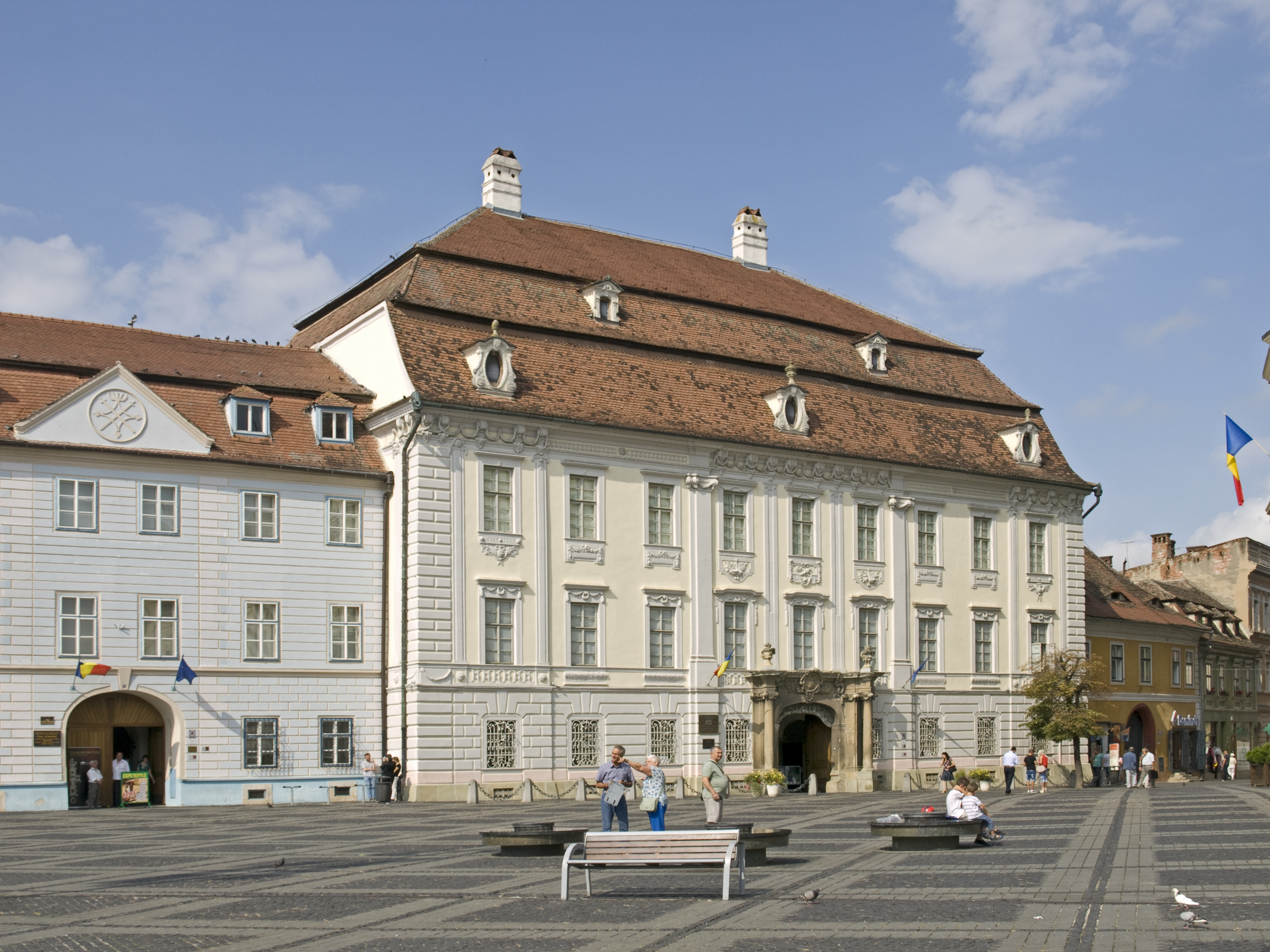
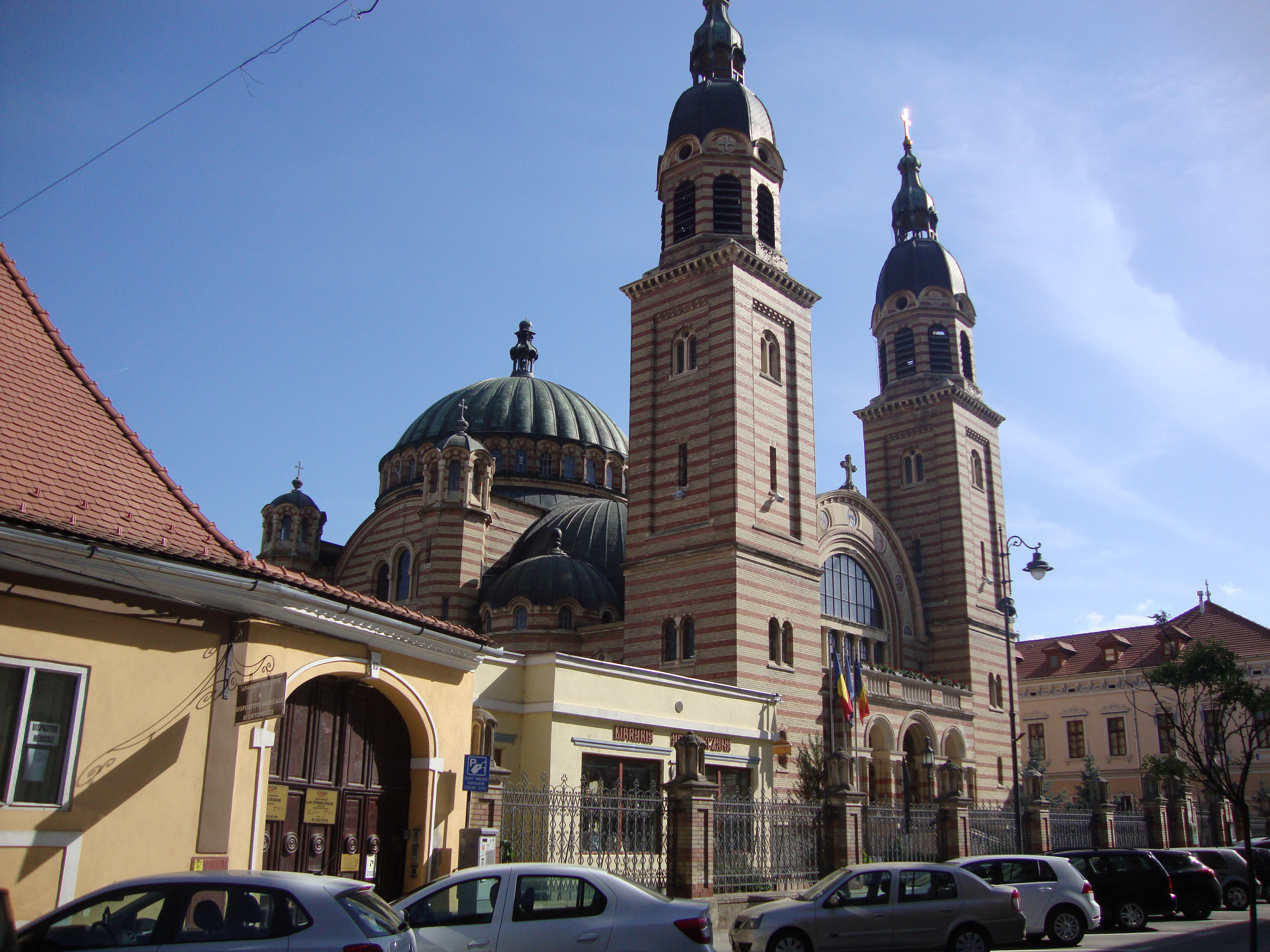
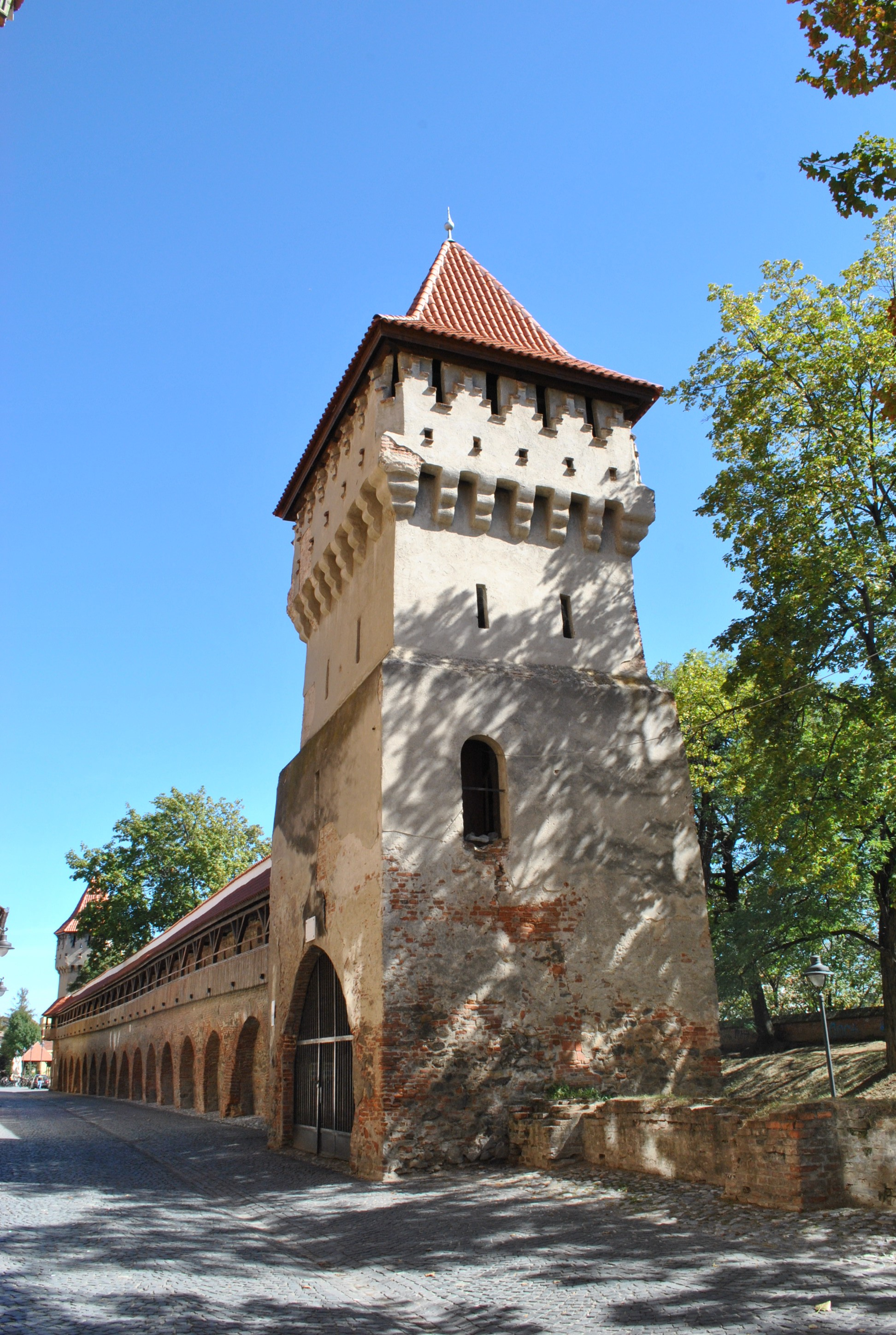
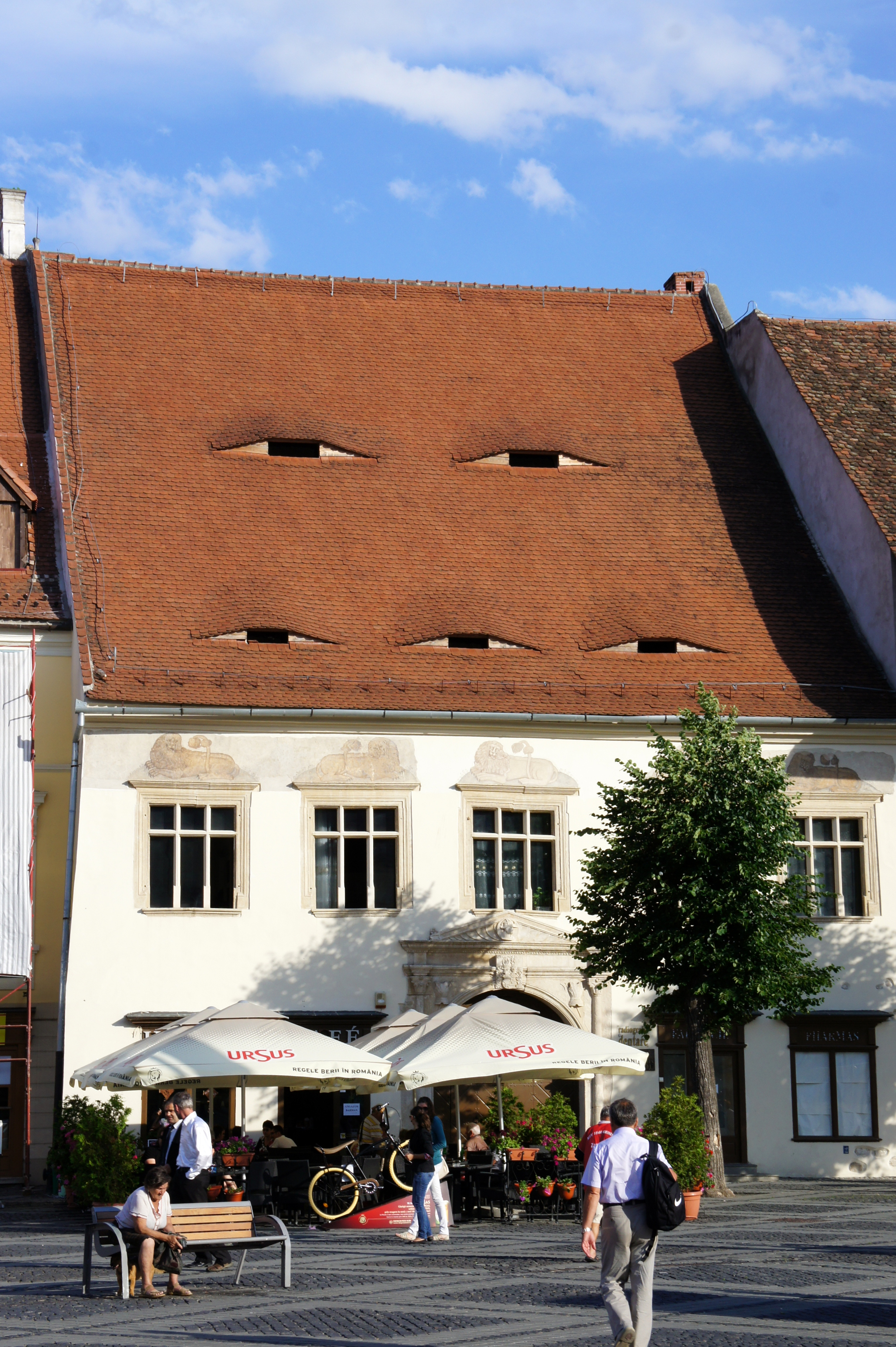
- Council Tower Lutheran Cathedral Piața Mare The Stairs Passage Bridge of Lies Brukenthal Palace Metropolitan Cathedral Potters' Tower Eyes of Sibiu

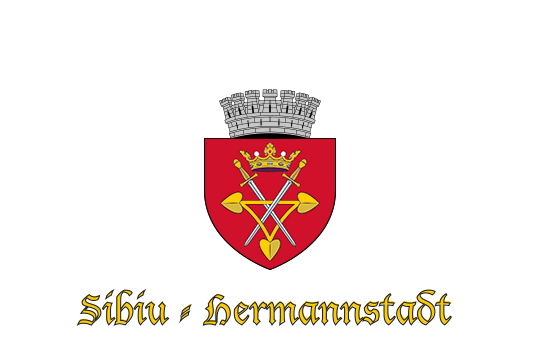
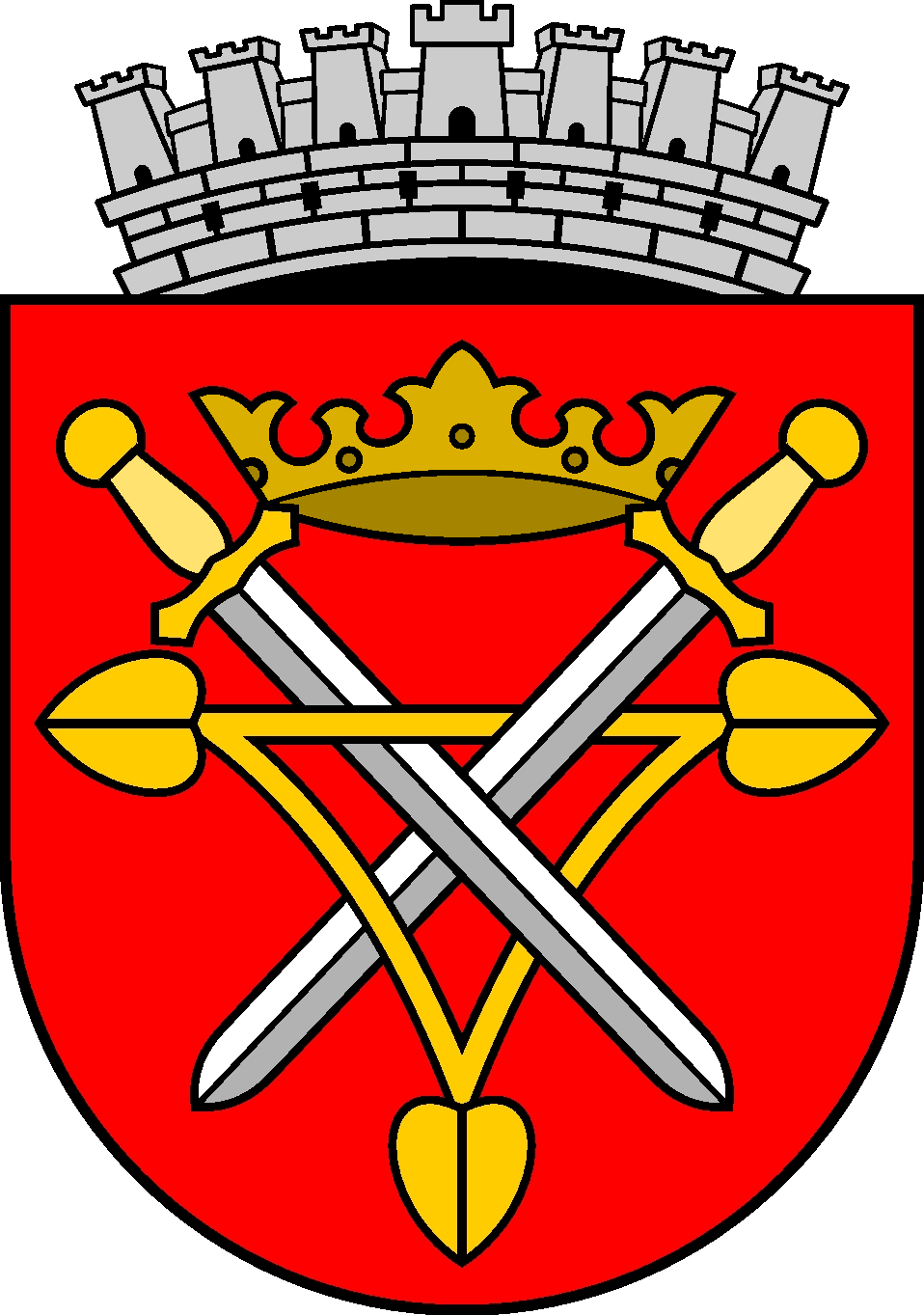
- Flag Coat of arms
- Nickname: The Town with Eyes
- Location in Sibiu County

- Location within Romania
- Coordinates: 45°47′34″N 24°09′07″E
- Country: Romania
- County: Sibiu
- Status: County seat
- Settled: 1st century BC
- Resettled: c. 1147
- First off. record: 1191 (as Cibinium)
- Founder: Hermann

Government
  - Mayor (2024–2028): Astrid Fodor (FDGR/DFDR)

Area
  - County seat and Municipality: 121 km^{2} (47 sq mi)
- Elevation: 415 m (1,362 ft)

Population (2021 census)
  - County seat and Municipality: 134,309
  - Density: 1,110/km^{2} (2,870/sq mi)
  - Metro^{a}: 267,170
- Demonym(s): sibian, sibiancă (ro) hermannstädter (de)
- Time zone: UTC+2 (EET)
  - Summer (DST): UTC+3 (EEST)
- Postal code: 55xxxx
- Area code: +40 269/369
- Car plates: SB
- Website: turism.sibiu.ro/en
- ^{a}Sibiu metropolitan area is a proposed project

Sibiu (/siːˈbjuː/ see-BEW, pronounced [siˈbiw], German: Hermannstadt [ˈhɛʁmanʃtat], Hungarian: Nagyszeben, Latin: Cibinium, Transylvanian Saxon: Härmeschtat or Hermestatt) is a city in central Romania, situated in the historical region of Transylvania. Located some 275 km (171 mi) north-west of Bucharest, the city straddles the Cibin River, a tributary of the Olt River. Now the seat of Sibiu County, between 1692 and 1791 and 1849–65, Sibiu was the capital of the Principality of Transylvania. Until 1876, the Hecht house in Sibiu served as the seat of the Transylvanian Saxon University.

Nicknamed The Town with Eyes for the eyebrow dormers on many old buildings, the town is a popular tourist destination. It is known for its culture, history, cuisine, and architecture.

Several fortified villages near Sibiu, such as Biertan and Valea Viilor, were inscribed as a UNESCO World Heritage Site in 1993 under the collective listing "Villages with Fortified Churches in Transylvania". Separately, in 2004, the historical center of Sibiu was added to Romania's tentative list of UNESCO World Heritage Sites, but has not yet been officially inscribed. It was later designated the European Capital of Culture in 2007, alongside Luxembourg City. In 2008, Forbes ranked Sibiu as "Europe's 8th-most idyllic place to live". In 2019, Sibiu was named the European Region of Gastronomy and hosted a European Union summit. In 2021, it also hosted the European Wandering Capital event, the continent’s most prominent hiking and eco-tourism gathering.

Sibiu is also known nationally and internationally for its Christmas market. Renowned personalities include Transylvanian Saxon scientists Conrad Haas and Hermann Oberth, who were both pioneers of rocketry.

As of 2021 census, the city has a population of 134,309, making it the 15th most populous city in Romania. The proposed Sibiu metropolitan area has a population of 267,170. The town also administers the village of Păltiniș, a ski resort located 35 kilometres to the southwest.

During the High and Late Middle Ages, Sibiu was the most important cultural and administrative centre of the Transylvanian Saxons. It is called Härmeschtat in their local dialect, which is close to Luxembourgish, from which it primarily descended during the Ostsiedlung.

== Name ==
The name of the city derives from the Bulgar-Turkic name Sibin<Sebin<Säbin, perhaps meaning "rejoice". An archaic version of the Romanian name Sibiu is Sibiiu, while an obsolete folk name is Sâghii, formerly spelled Sîghii. Its Hungarian name is Nagyszeben ("Big/Greater Sibiu"), or colloquially, Szeben.

In German, it is called Hermannstadt ("Hermann's town"), while in the local Transylvanian Saxon dialect, it is known as Härmeschtat. In Yiddish, it is called סעבען Seben or הערמאנשטאט Hermanshtat.

A number of other languages also have their own variants of the city's name, like Czech Sibiň, Polish Sybin, Serbo-Croatian Sibinj / Сибињ, archaic Bulgarian Сибин (Sibin), archaic French Sébeste or Ceben and the proposed Esperanto name Sibio.

== History ==
Historical affiliations

Kingdom of Hungary 1191–1526
Eastern Hungarian Kingdom 1526–1570
Principality of Transylvania 1570–1804
Austrian Empire 1804–1867
Austria-Hungary 1867–1918 (de jure Hungary until 1920)
Kingdom of Romania 1920–1947 (de facto from 1918)
Romanian People's Republic 1947–1965
Socialist Republic of Romania 1965–1989
Romania 1989–present

The Roman fort of Cedonia was perhaps in the same location as Sibiu. The town was founded by Saxon (German) settlers brought there by King of Hungary and King of Croatia Géza II during the mid-late 12th century, as part of the Ostsiedlung. They came from territories of the Holy Roman Empire and Kingdom of France (nowadays parts of Germany, France and the Benelux countries) and arrived at around 1147. The first references to the area were Cibinium and Cipin from 1191 when Pope Celestine III confirmed the existence of the free prepositure of the Saxons in Transylvania, having its headquarters in Sibiu. The city also used the names Prepositus Cibiniensis (1192–1196) and Prepositus Scibiniensis (1211). In 1223, it was renamed to Villa Hermanni, either in honor of archbishop Hermann II of Cologne or after a man who is believed to have founded the city, Hermann of Nuremberg. The actual German name of Hermannstadt ("Hermann's city") dates from 1366, while an earlier form, Hermannsdorf ("Hermann's village") was recorded in 1321. An alternative urban legend has it that the town was named after a certain shoemaker by the name Hermann.

Medieval fortifications which can be found in Sibiu's old town

In the 14th century, it was already an important trade centre. In 1376, the craftsmen were divided in 19 guilds. Hermannstadt became the most important ethnic German city among the seven cities that gave Transylvania its German name Siebenbürgen (literally seven citadels). It was home to the Transylvanian Saxon University (Latin: Universitas Saxonum; i.e. Community of the Saxons), a network of pedagogues, ministers, intellectuals, city officials, and councilmen of the German community forging an ordered legal corpus and political system in Transylvania since the 1400s. In 1699, after the Ottomans withdrew to their base of power in Hungary and Transylvania, the town became capital of Principality of Transylvania (since 1570 the principality was mostly under suzerainty of the Ottoman Empire, however often had a dual vassalage).

During the 18th and 19th centuries, the city became the second- and later the first-most important centre of Transylvanian Romanian ethnics. The first Romanian-owned bank had its headquarters here (The Albina Bank), as did the ASTRA (Transylvanian Association for Romanian Literature and Romanian's People Culture). After the Romanian Orthodox Church was granted status in the Austrian Empire from the 1860s onwards, Sibiu became the Metropolitan seat, and the city is still regarded as the third-most important centre of the Romanian Orthodox Church. Between the Hungarian Revolution of 1848 and 1867 (the year of the Ausgleich), Hermannstadt was the meeting-place of the Transylvanian Diet, which had taken its most representative form after the Empire agreed to extend voting rights in the region.

After World War I, when Austria-Hungary was dissolved and Sibiu became part of the Kingdom of Romania; the majority of its population was still ethnically German (until 1941) and counted a large Romanian community as well as a smaller Hungarian one. Starting from the 1950s and until 1990, most of the town's ethnic Germans emigrated to West Germany and Austria. The trend continued to a moderate extent after 1990 as well to unified Germany. Nonetheless, among the approximately 2,000 Transylvanian Saxons who decided to remain as per the 2011 Romanian census was Klaus Iohannis, the former President of Romania and former longtime mayor of the town between 2000 and 2014, who was succeeded by Astrid Fodor since 2014 onwards, initially ad interim/acting, and then, subsequently in full constitutional powers after 2016.

Map of Hermannstadt (Sibiu) around 1750

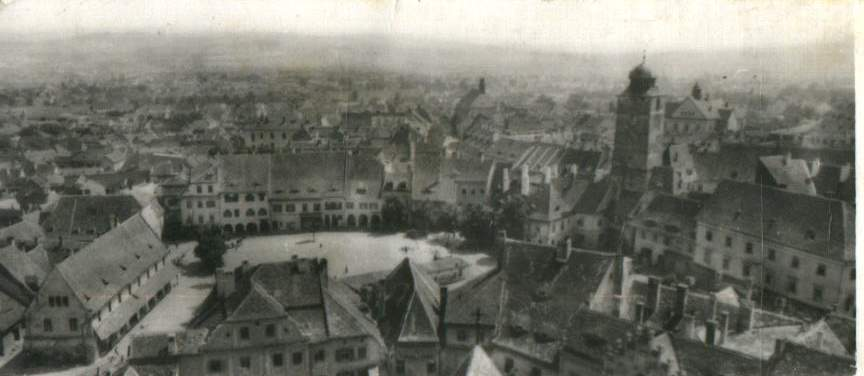
Panoramic view of Sibiu from 1928

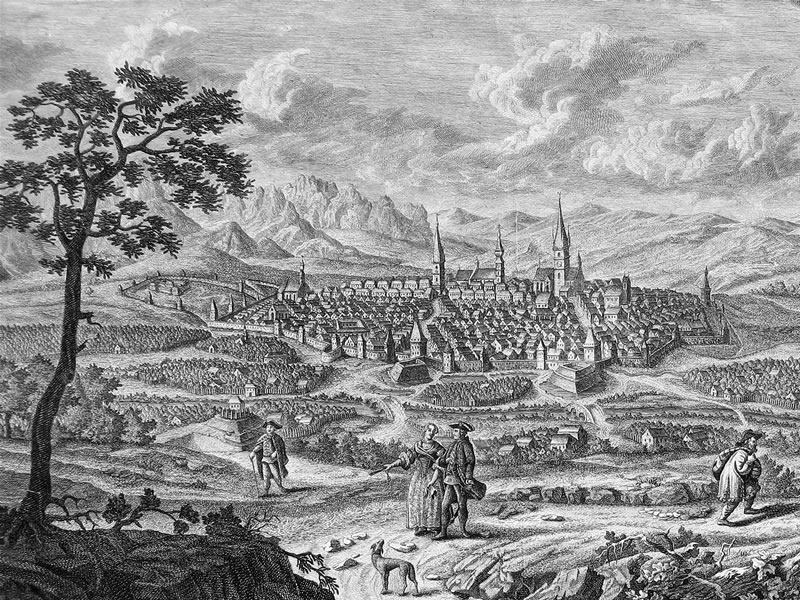
View from Gușterița hill

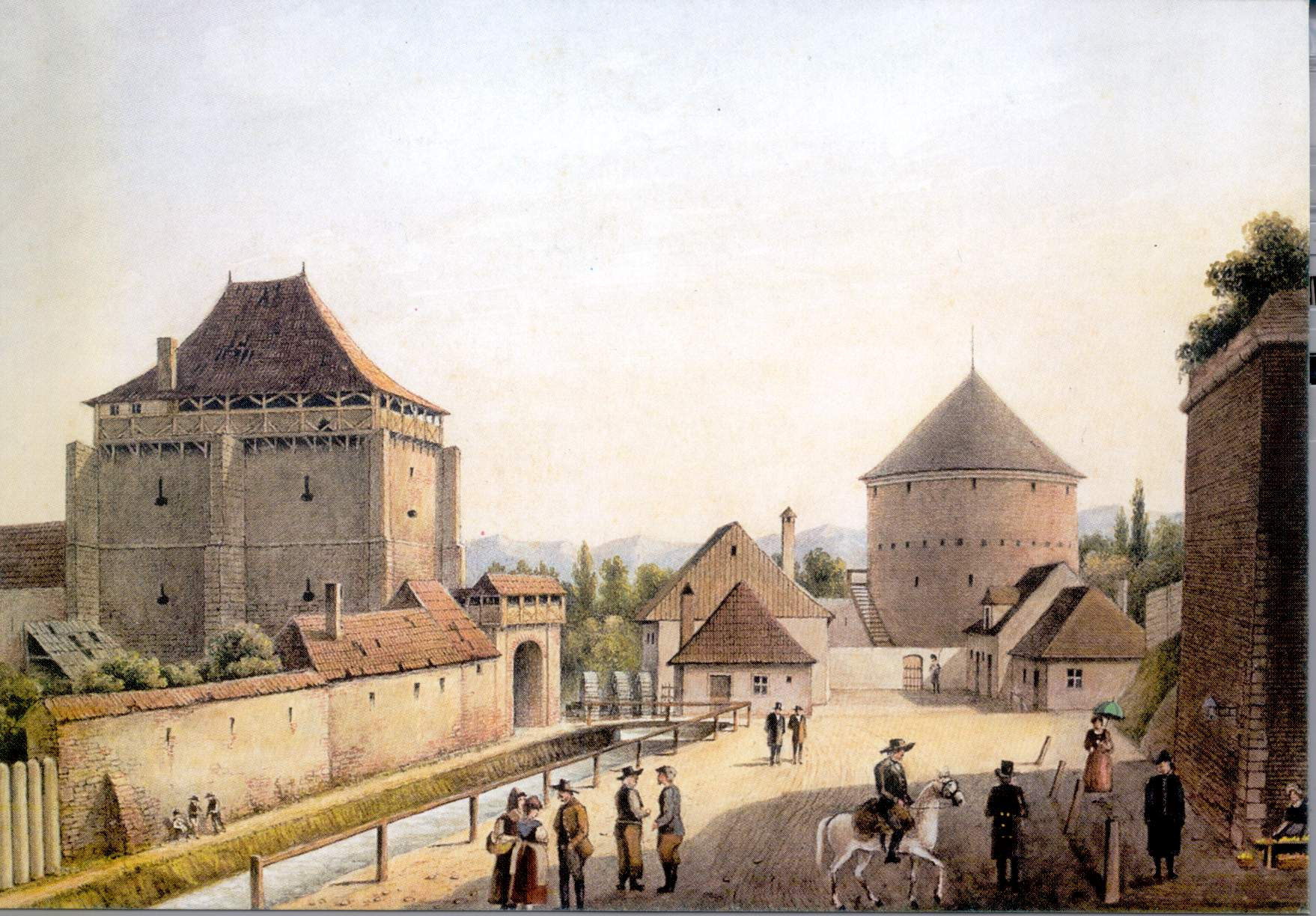
Burger-Ocnei gate

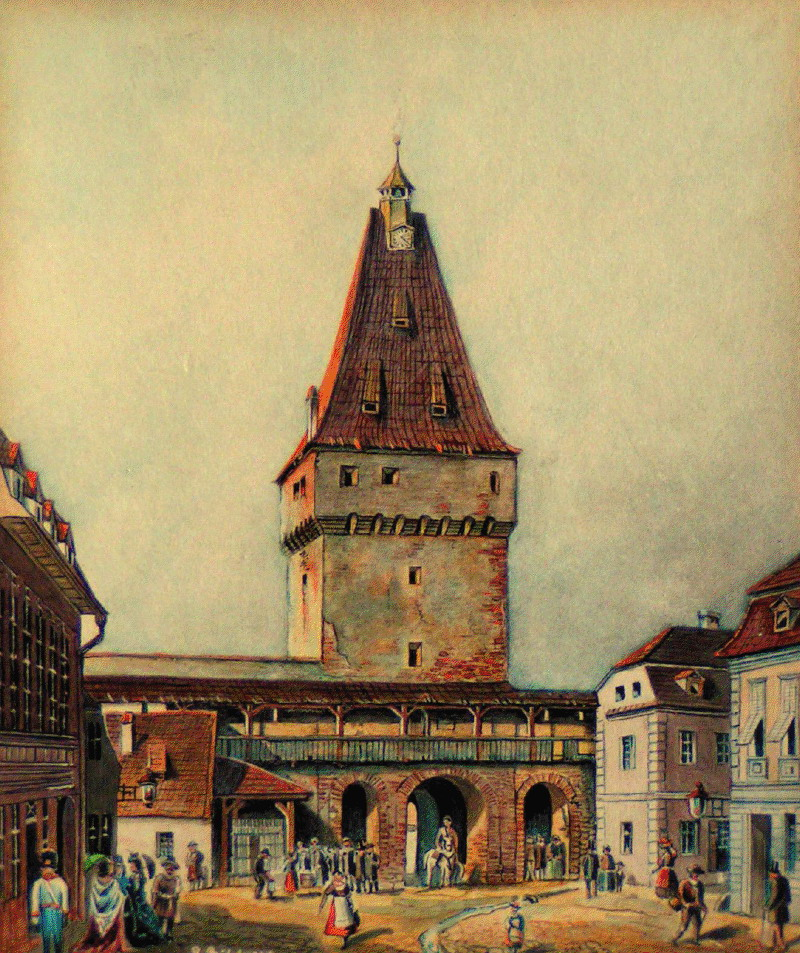
Cisnădie's Gate Tower

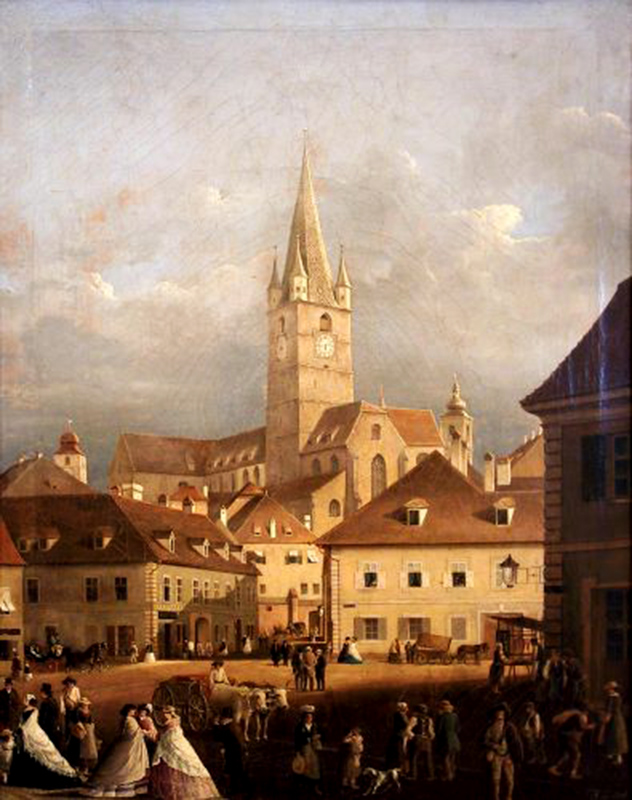
Tower's Street and the Lutheran Cathedral

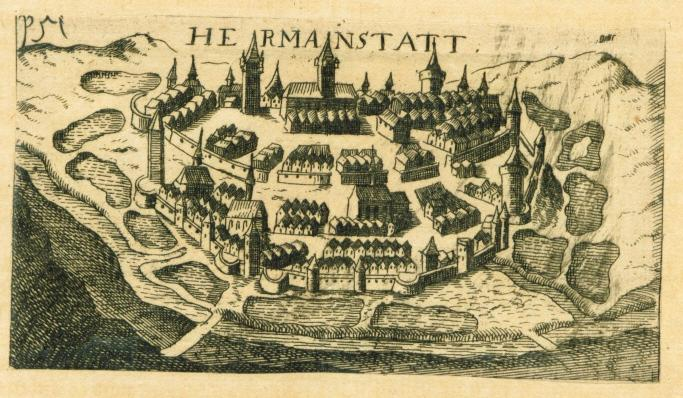
Copper engraving of Sibiu (Hermanstatt), c. 1630

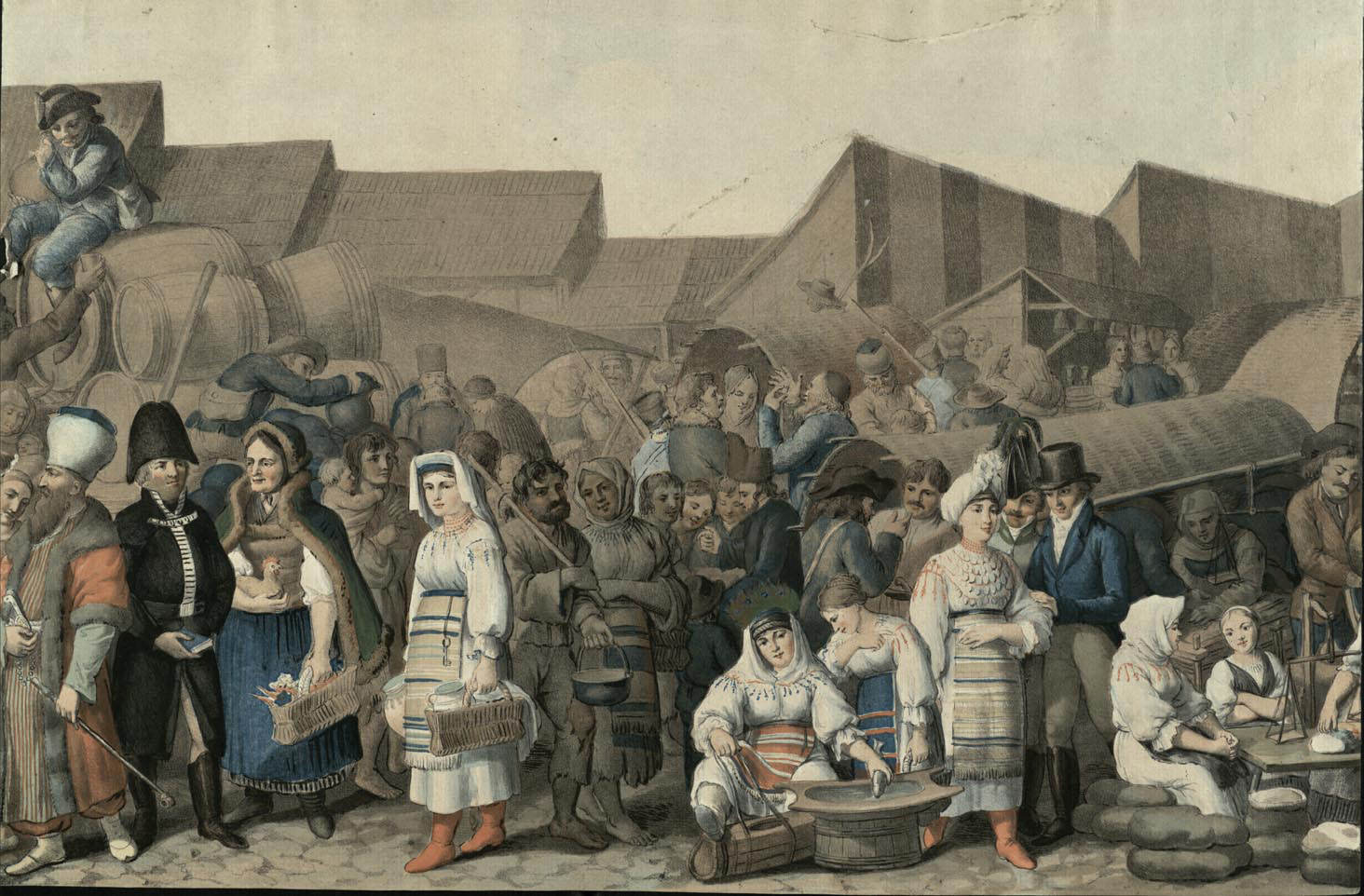
A busy market scene in Sibiu, 1818

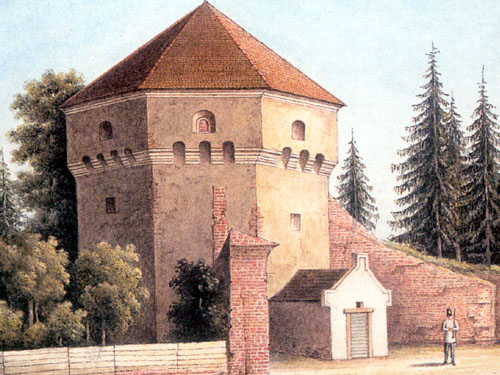
The Tanners' Tower, painted by Johann Böbel

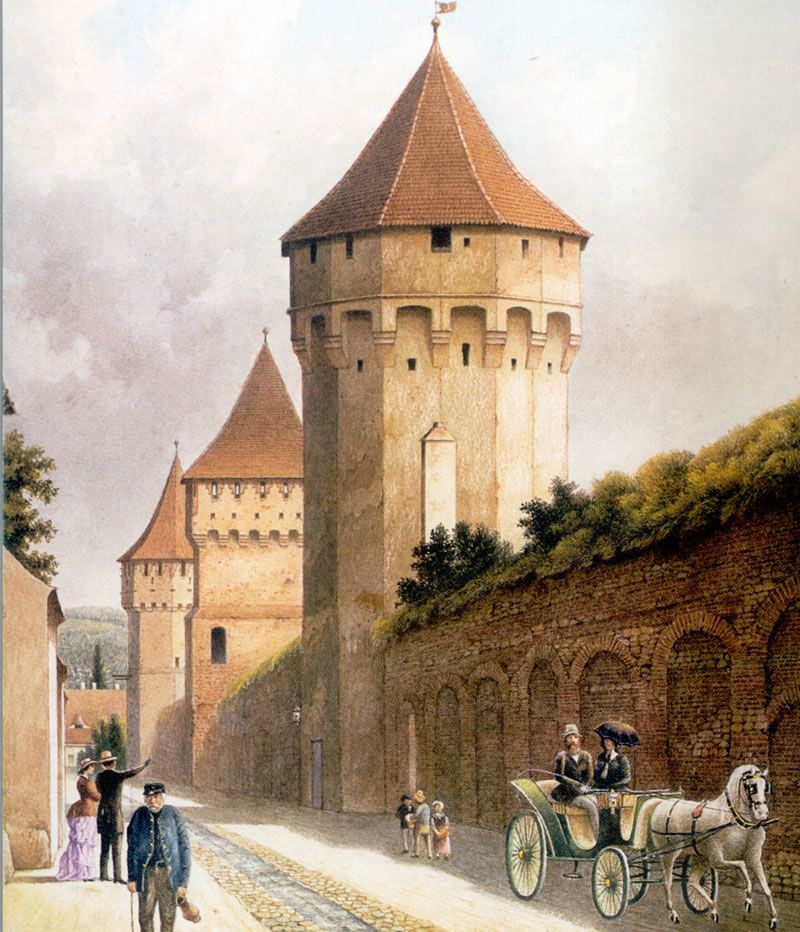
Citadel Square, painted by Johann Böbel

== Geography ==
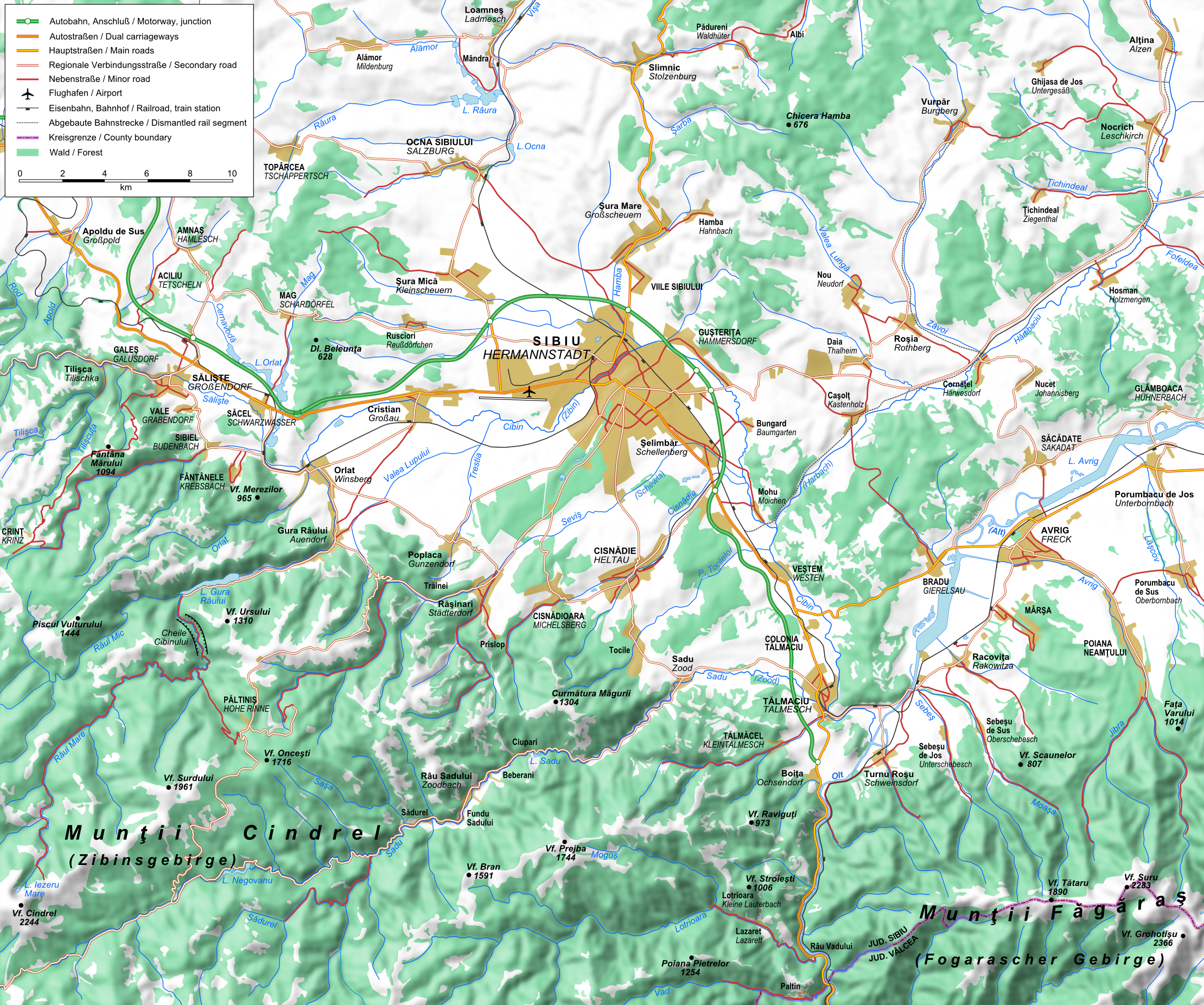
Topographic map of the Sibiu region

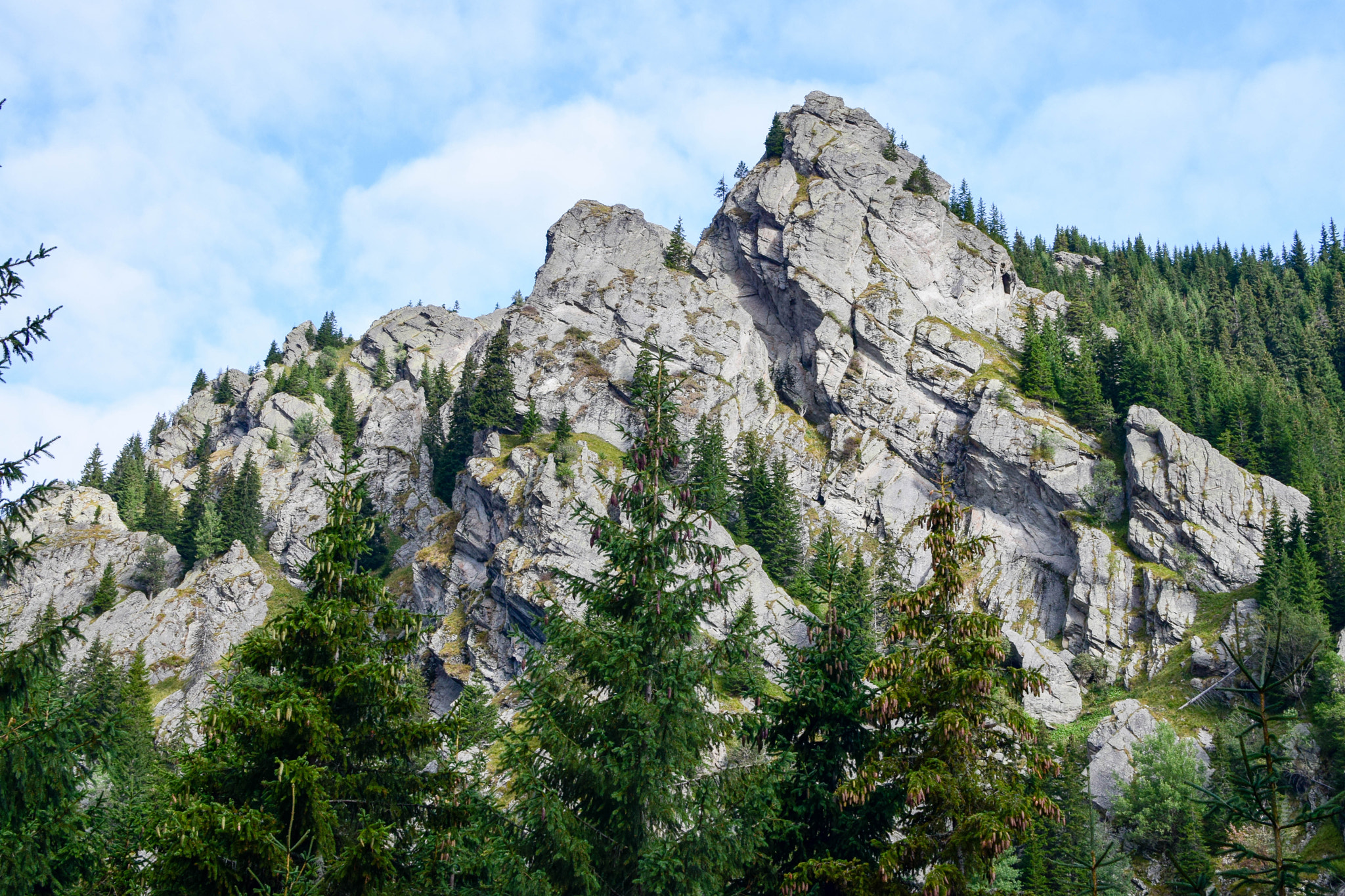
Făgăraș Mountains

Sibiu is situated near the geographical center of Romania at 45.792784°N 24.152069°E. Set in the Cibin Depression, the city is about 20 km (12 mi) from the Făgăraș Mountains, 12 km (7.5 mi) from the Cibin Mountains, and about 15 km (9.3 mi) from the Lotru Mountains, which border the depression in its southwestern section. The northern and eastern limits of Sibiu are formed by the Târnavelor Plateau, which descends to the Cibin Valley through Gușteriței Hill.

The Cibin River and some smaller streams run through Sibiu. The geographical position of Sibiu makes it one of the most important transportation hubs in Romania, with important roads and railway lines passing through it, including the A1 motorway, which also serves as a heavy traffic bypass for the city.

=== Climate ===
Sibiu's climate is humid continental (Köppen: Dfb), with average temperatures of 8 to 9 °C (46 to 48 °F). The average precipitation is 643.7 millimetres (25.34 in), and there are about 120 days of hard frost annually. Sibiu experiences 56 days per year with fog and 1.5 days with hail.

Climate data for Sibiu (1991–2020, extremes 1901-present)
Month	Jan	Feb	Mar	Apr	May	Jun	Jul	Aug	Sep	Oct	Nov	Dec	Year
Record high °C (°F)	17.8 (64.0)	21.3 (70.3)	30.6 (87.1)	30.2 (86.4)	32.2 (90.0)	35.4 (95.7)	38.3 (100.9)	38.9 (102.0)	39.5 (103.1)	32.5 (90.5)	27.0 (80.6)	20.1 (68.2)	39.5 (103.1)
Mean daily maximum °C (°F)	2.3 (36.1)	5.5 (41.9)	10.7 (51.3)	16.7 (62.1)	21.4 (70.5)	25.1 (77.2)	26.9 (80.4)	27.1 (80.8)	21.8 (71.2)	16.6 (61.9)	10.1 (50.2)	3.4 (38.1)	15.6 (60.1)
Daily mean °C (°F)	−2.5 (27.5)	−0.2 (31.6)	4.4 (39.9)	10.2 (50.4)	15.1 (59.2)	18.7 (65.7)	20.3 (68.5)	19.9 (67.8)	14.8 (58.6)	9.5 (49.1)	4.3 (39.7)	−0.9 (30.4)	9.5 (49.1)
Mean daily minimum °C (°F)	−6.6 (20.1)	−4.8 (23.4)	−0.7 (30.7)	4.3 (39.7)	8.9 (48.0)	12.4 (54.3)	13.9 (57.0)	13.5 (56.3)	9.1 (48.4)	4.0 (39.2)	−0.4 (31.3)	−4.7 (23.5)	4.1 (39.4)
Record low °C (°F)	−31.8 (−25.2)	−31.0 (−23.8)	−24.5 (−12.1)	−12.0 (10.4)	−3.6 (25.5)	1.0 (33.8)	2.8 (37.0)	−2.1 (28.2)	−9.4 (15.1)	−18.4 (−1.1)	−26.7 (−16.1)	−29.8 (−21.6)	−31.8 (−25.2)
Average precipitation mm (inches)	25.8 (1.02)	23.2 (0.91)	34.9 (1.37)	53.9 (2.12)	77.2 (3.04)	97.3 (3.83)	94.7 (3.73)	71.1 (2.80)	55.6 (2.19)	46.5 (1.83)	32.5 (1.28)	31.0 (1.22)	643.7 (25.34)
Average snowfall cm (inches)	11.0 (4.3)	11.0 (4.3)	7.4 (2.9)	4.8 (1.9)	0.0 (0.0)	0.0 (0.0)	0.0 (0.0)	0.0 (0.0)	0.0 (0.0)	1.7 (0.7)	4.5 (1.8)	6.5 (2.6)	46.9 (18.5)
Average precipitation days (≥ 1.0 mm)	5.7	5.1	6.8	8.4	11.3	10.7	9.5	7.4	6.8	6.3	5.2	6.1	89.3
Average relative humidity (%)	87	79	71	67	68	71	71	72	76	78	80	86	75
Average dew point °C (°F)	−5.8 (21.6)	−4.2 (24.4)	−0.4 (31.3)	4.1 (39.4)	9.3 (48.7)	12.7 (54.9)	13.8 (56.8)	13.3 (55.9)	10.4 (50.7)	5.4 (41.7)	1.5 (34.7)	−2.6 (27.3)	4.8 (40.6)
Mean monthly sunshine hours	73.9	97.3	137.6	171.8	209.9	232.5	253.6	249.0	174.7	148.4	92.4	61.3	1,902.4
Source 1: NOAA (snowfall and dew point 1961–1990), Meteomanz (extremes since 2021)
Source 2: Romanian National Statistic Institute (extremes 1901–2000), Deutscher Wetterdienst (humidity, 1989–2008)

== Tourism ==
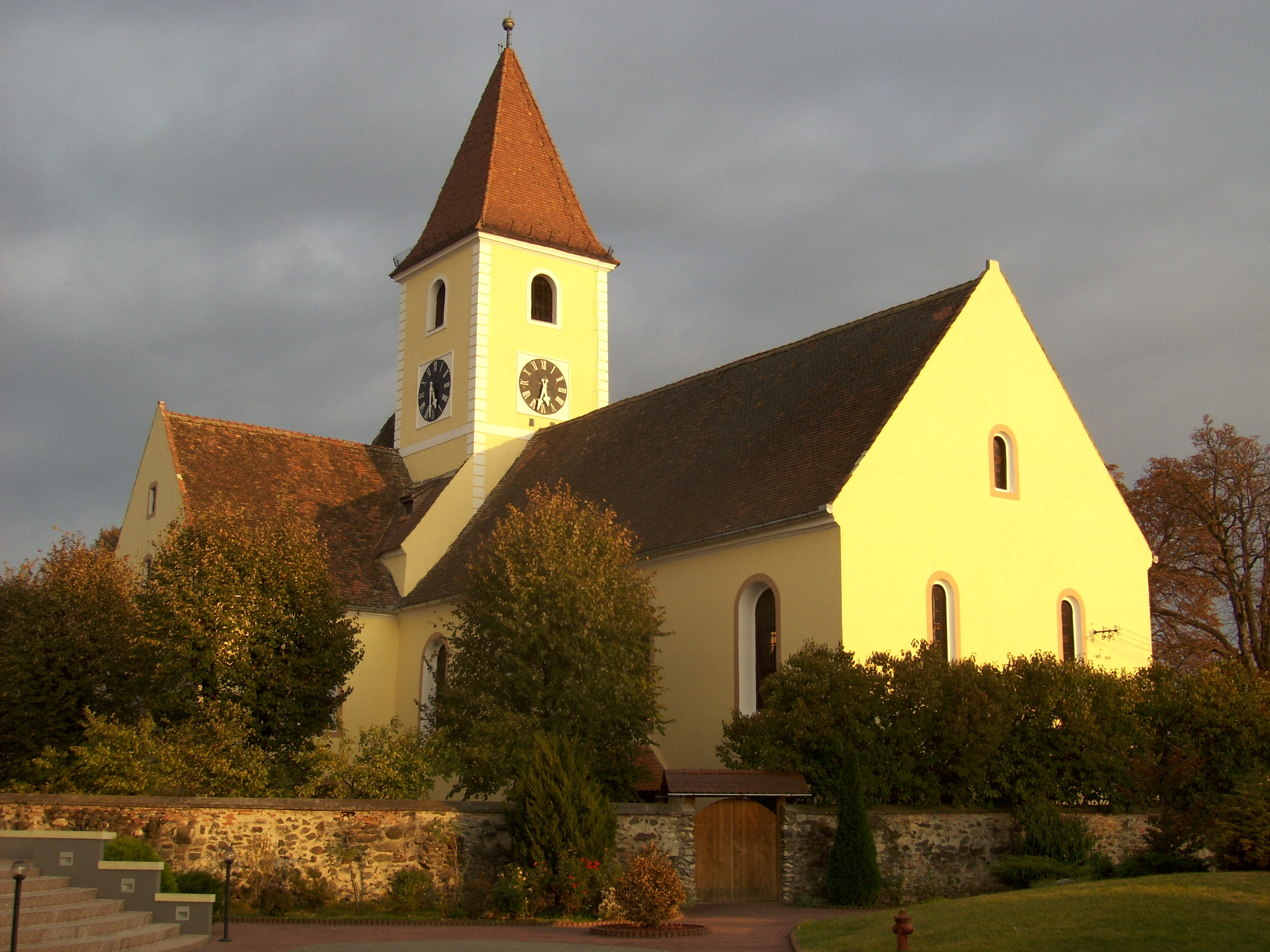
The Evangelical Lutheran fortified church in Turnișor (German: Neppendorf), belonging to the local Transylvanian Landler community.

In 2007, Sibiu was the European Capital of Culture (alongside Luxembourg City). This was the most important cultural event that has ever happened in the town, and a great number of tourists came, both domestic and foreign.

The city of Sibiu and its surroundings are one of the most visited areas in Romania, as it holds one of the best preserved historical sites in the country, many of its medieval fortifications having been kept in excellent state. Its old center has begun the process for becoming a UNESCO World Heritage Site in 2004. Sibiu and its surrounding area have many significant museums, with 12+ institutions housing art collections, paintings, and exhibits in decorative arts, archeology, anthropology, history, industrial archeology and history of technology and natural sciences.

The city also lies close to the Făgăraș Mountains – a popular trekking destination, close to the city of Păltiniș and Arena Platoș ski resorts – both winter holiday destinations, and it is at the heart of the former Saxon communities in Transylvania renowned for its fortified churches.

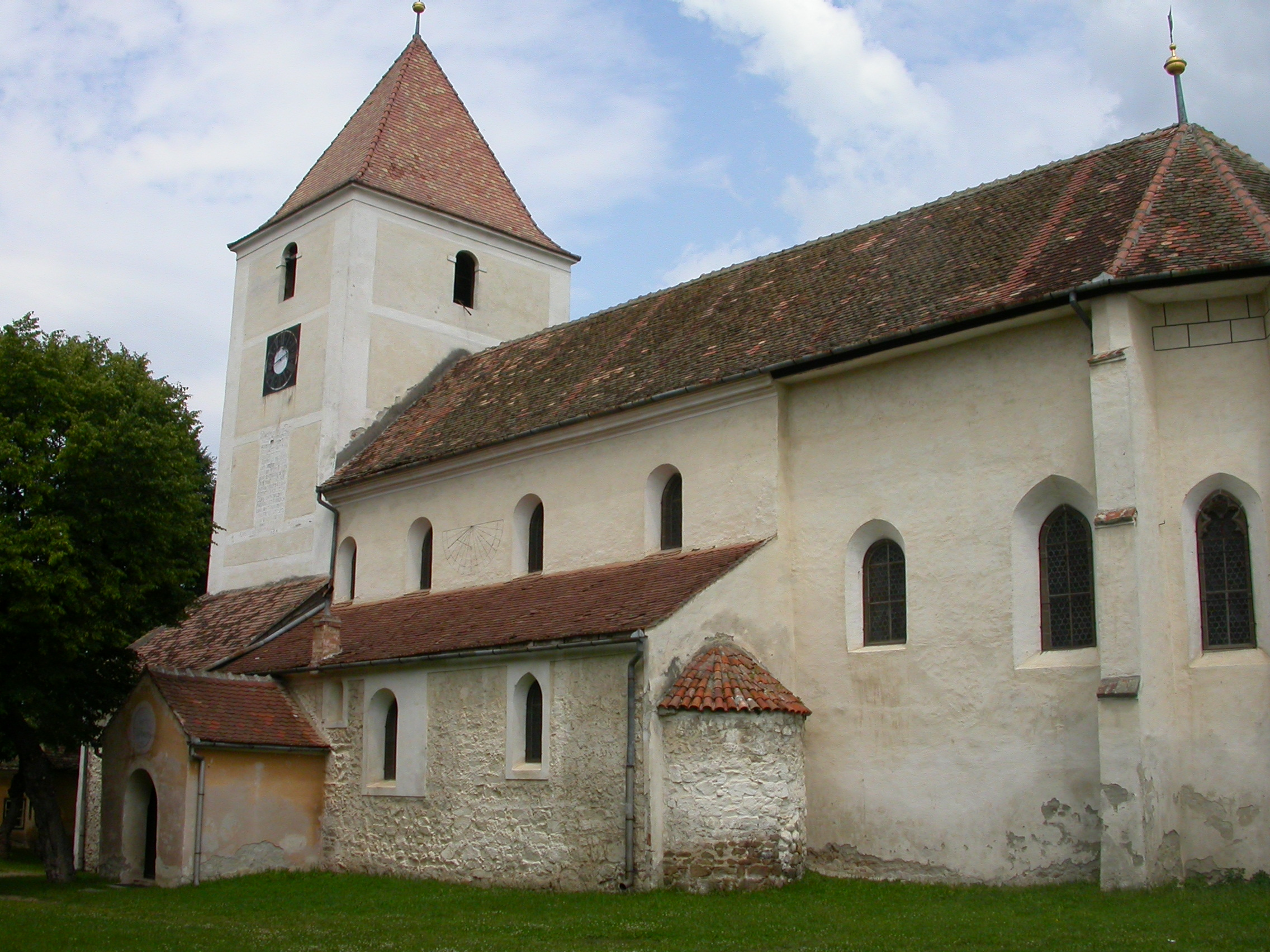
Fortified Evangelical Lutheran church of Gușterița (German: Hammersdorf) neighbourhood, built during the 13th century, belonging to the local Transylvanian Saxon community.

Since 2007, a Christmas market has been held in Sibiu. The first of its kind in Romania, it is inspired by Viennese Christmas markets, being a project developed by the Social Attaché of the Austrian Embassy in Romania, dr.h.c. Barbara Schöfnagel. It was held in the "Lesser Square" (Piața Mică) with 38 small stalls, a small stage and an area dedicated to children, having several mechanical attractions installed there. Since 2008, the market has been held in the "Grand Square" (Piaţa Mare) grew to a number of about 70 stalls, a bigger stage was set up, where Christmas carols concerts are held. An ice skating rink and a children's workshop are also attractions which have been added in the following years. It was the first Christmas Market in Romania, but soon other Christmas markets emerged across the country. In 2013, the Sibiu Christmas market was included in the "15 Of the Most Beautiful Christmas Markets in Europe".

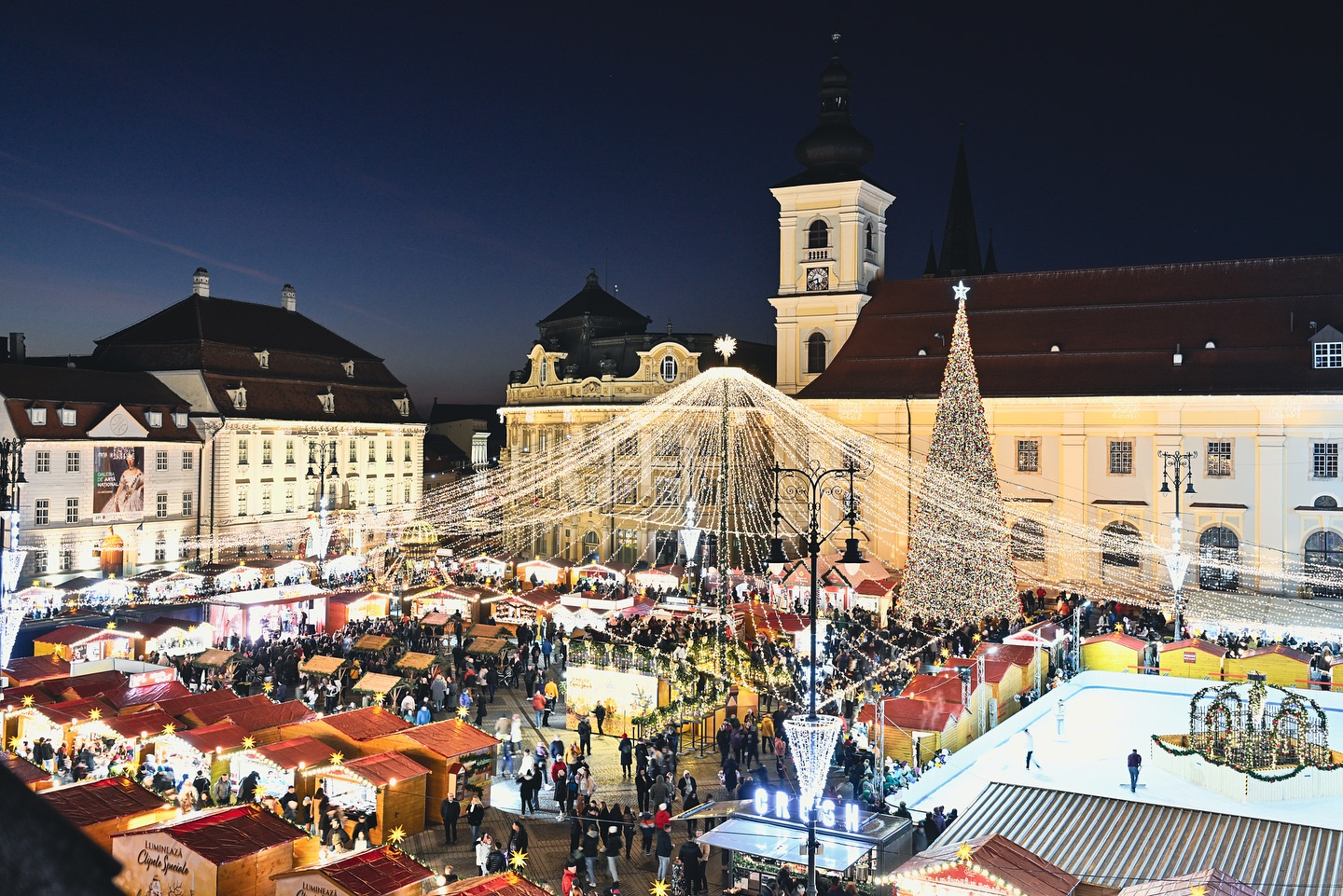
The Sibiu Christmas Market

In 2019, Sibiu planned to host the European Gastronomical capital, by encouraging the local producers and businesses in the field of food production and culinary and gourmet culture, traditional workshops in the villages of the region, promoting farms and gastronomic circuits, or developing public programs to support small businesses in gastronomy and of the hospitality industry in the Sibiu region.

== Culture ==
Sibiu has two theatres and a philharmonic orchestra along with other smaller private theatrical venues and a theatre studio housed by the Performing Arts and Acting section of Lucian Blaga University, where students hold monthly representations.

The Radu Stanca National Theatre is one of the leading Romanian theatres. With origins dating back to 1787, it attracts some of the best-known Romanian directors, such as Gábor Tompa and Silviu Purcărete. It has both a Romanian-language and a German-language section, and presents an average of five shows a week.

The Gong Theatre is specialised in puppetry, mime and non-conventional shows for children and teenagers. It also presents shows in both Romanian and German.

The State Philharmonic of Sibiu presents weekly classical music concerts, and educational concerts for children and teenagers. The concerts take place in the newly restored Thalia Hall, a concert and theatre hall dating from 1787, situated along the old city fortifications. Weekly organ concerts are organised at the Evangelical Cathedral during summers, and thematic concerts are presented by the Faculty of Theology choir at the Orthodox Cathedral.

The Sibiu International Theatre Festival is an annual festival of performing arts. Since 2016, it is the largest performance arts festival in the world.

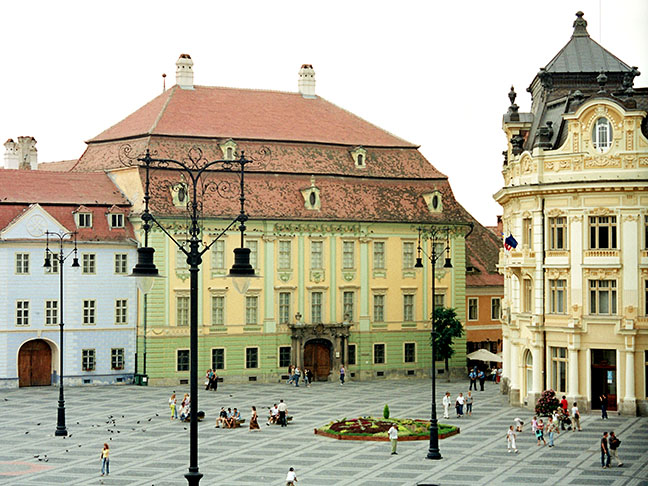
Brukenthal National Museum, Sibiu

=== Museums and parks ===
Sibiu's museums are organised around two entities: the Brukenthal National Museum and the ASTRA National Museum Complex. The Brukenthal Museum consists of an Art Gallery and an Old Books Library located inside the Brukenthal Palace, a History Museum located in the old town hall building, a Pharmacy Museum located in one of the first apothecary shops in Europe, dating from the 16th century, a Natural History Museum and a Museum of Arms and Hunting Trophies.

The ASTRA National Museum Complex focuses on ethnography, and consists of a Traditional Folk Civilisation Museum, a 96-hectare open-air museum located in Dumbrava Forest south of Sibiu, a Universal Ethnography Museum, a Museum of Transylvanian Civilisation and a Museum of Saxon Ethnography and Folk Art. Also planned is a Museum of the Culture and Civilisation of the Romany People.

The Dumbrava Sibiului Natural Park stretches over 960 ha (2,400 acres) and it is 4 km (2.5 mi) away from the center of the city in the southwest direction along the road towards Rășinari. Also, here you can find the Zoological Garden and Ethnography Museum.

There is a Steam Locomotives Museum close to the railway station, sheltering around 40 locomotives, two of which are functional.

The first park in the city was The Promenade, later called "The Disabled Promenade." established in 1791, today part of Parcul Cetății (Citadel Park). Current arrangement of the park, including the space between the walls, dates from 1928.

The Sub Arini Park, established between 1857 and 1859 based on plans of military engineer Michael Seyfried, is one of the biggest and best-maintained parks in Romania. There are other green spaces in the city center, the best known being Astra Park, established in 1879.

Other parks:

Tineretului Park, Reconstrucției Park, Corneliu Coposu Park, Petöfi Sándor Park, Piața Cluj Park, Ștrand Park, Cristianului Park, Țițeica Park, Vasile Aaron Park, Lira Park.

The distribution of green space is good compared to other Romanian cities.

=== Events ===
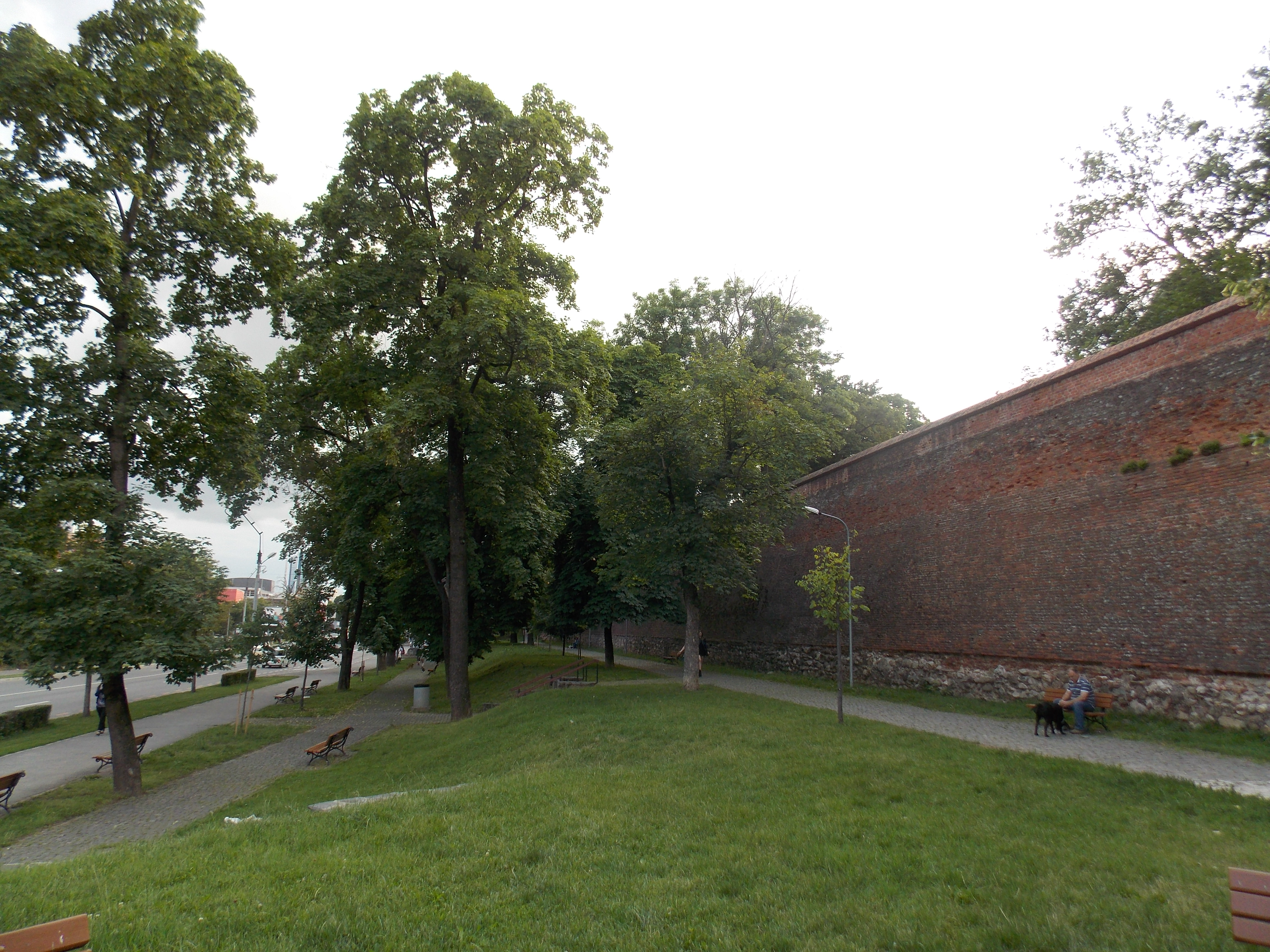
Citadel Park, with the 16th century city wall

Several festivals are organised yearly in Sibiu, the most prestigious of them being the Sibiu International Theatre Festival, organized each spring at the end of May. Medieval Festival organized every year in August, reviving the medieval spirit of Transylvania. The Artmania Festival is held every Summer since 2006 and as of 2008 the Rockin' Transilvania Festival is also held in Sibiu. The oldest Jazz Festival in Romania is organized here, as well as the "Carl Filtsch" festival for young classical piano players, the "Astra Film" documentary film festival, the Transylvania calling Festival a Multi Cultural 6-day Open Air Music festival! 26–31 July 2007, a medieval arts festival and many more smaller cultural events. Feeric Fashion Week is also hosted here. Sibiu was awarded by IGCAT (International Institute of Gastronomy, Culture, Arts and Tourism) to be part of the European Regions of Gastronomy program, event that will promote in 2019 the region's culinary heritage, multi-ethnic traditions and multi-cultural community.

=== European Cultural Capital ===
The designation of Sibiu as European Cultural Capital in 2007 was owed greatly to the excellent collaboration with Luxembourg (and to the noteworthy historical ties between the Transylvanian Saxon community and Luxembourg), but also to what many regard as a miraculous social rebirth taking place in the town during the last years. The Cultural Capital status was expected to bring about an abrupt increase in quantity and quality of cultural events in 2007 and so it did.

== Administration ==
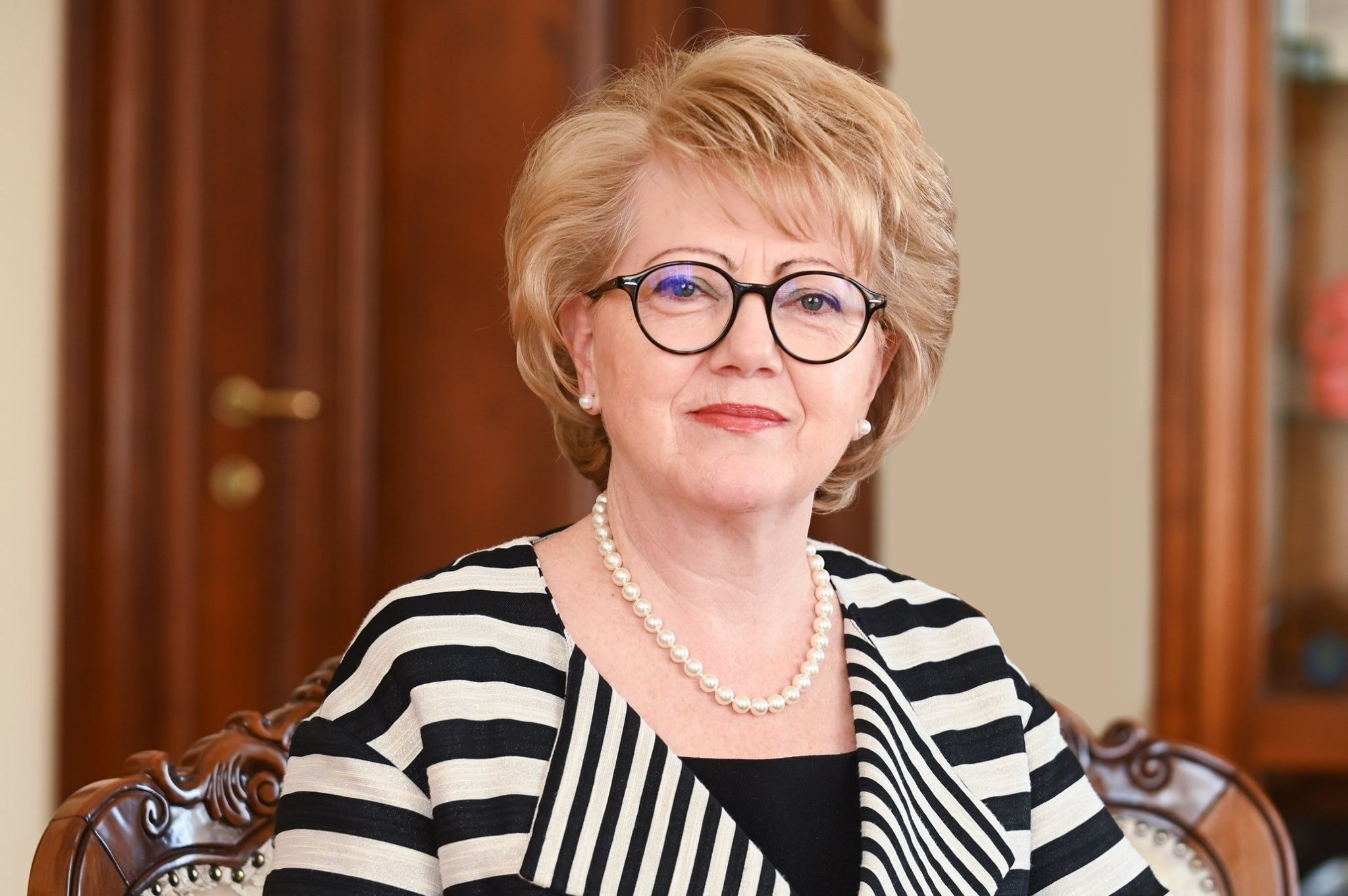
Incumbent mayor Astrid Cora Fodor (FDGR/DFDR)

The town government is headed by a mayor. Since 2014, the office is held by Astrid Fodor from the Democratic Forum of Germans in Romania (FDGR/DFDR), who replaced Klaus Iohannis, the latter having become the 5th president of Romania. Iohannis, a Transylvanian Saxon, was mayor from 2000 to 2014, despite ethnic Germans nowadays making up less than 2% of Sibiu's population. Decisions are approved and discussed by the local government (Romanian: Consiliu local) made up of 23 elected councillors. Sibiu is the capital of the Sibiu County.

Party	Seats	Current Council
Democratic Forum of Germans in Romania (FDGR/DFDR)	8	
National Liberal Party (PNL)	5	
Social Democratic Party (PSD)	4	
Save Romania Union (USR)	3	
Alliance for the Union of Romanians (AUR)	2	
Force of the Right (FD)	1	

=== City districts ===
Sibiu is divided into the following districts:

- Historical center (divided into the Upper and Lower Town)
- Center (south-west of the historical center)
- Broscărie
- Dumbrăvii
- Gușterița (German: Hammersdorf)
- Hipodrom I, II, III, IV
- Lazaret
- Lupeni
- Piața Cluj (named after Cluj)
- Reșița (named after Reșița)
- Ștrand
- Terezian
- Tilișca
- Tineretului
- Trei Stejari
- Turnișor (German: Neppendorf)
- Țiglari
- Valea Aurie
- Vasile Aaron
- Veteranilor de Război
- Viile Sibiului

Some of them were villages annexed by the city as it grew, others were built as the city developed and increased its surface.

The ASTRA National Museum Complex and the Zoo, located in the south, also fall within city limits. The Păltiniș ski resort, located 35 kilometres to the south, is also administered by Sibiu.

While Șelimbăr and the Arhitecților district of Cisnădie are not part of Sibiu proper, they are adjacent to the city limits and often considered part of it.

== Demographics ==
At the 2011 census, Sibiu had a population of 147,245, a 5% decrease from the figure recorded at the 2002 census. The ethnic breakdown was as follows: Romanians 95.9%, Hungarians 1.6%, Germans (Transylvanian Saxons) 1.1%, and Roma 0.4%.

A 2017 estimate placed the population at 169,316, a 14.98% increase since 2011. This increase made Sibiu's population surpass the numbers observed in 1992 when the previously highest population was recorded.

As of the 2021 census data, 134,309 inhabitants live within the city limits, an 8.8% decrease from the figure recorded at the 2011 census.

=== Population dynamics ===
Census			Ethnic structure
Year	Population	%±	Romanians	Hungarians	Germans
1850	12,765	—	2,089	977	8,790
1880	19,446	+ 41.4%	2,810	2,065	14,327
1890	21,465	+ 9.8%	4,581	3,199	13,148
1900	29,577	+ 31.7%	7,106	5,747	16,141
1910	33,489	+ 12.4%	8,824	7,252	16,832
1920	32,748	– 2.2%	8,553	4,291	18,218
1930	49,345	+ 40.4%	19,006	6,782	22,045
1941	63,765	+ 25.5%	33,829	4,262	23,574
1948	60,602	– 5%	37,371	5,060	16,359
1956	90,475	+ 39.5%	60,526	4,772	24,636
1966	109,515	+ 19%	78,548	5,124	25,387
1977	151,005	+ 31.8%	119,507	5,111	25,403
1992	169,610	+ 11.6%	158,863	4,163	5,605
2002	154,892	– 9%	148,269	3,135	2,508
2011	147,245	– 5%	131,414	2,131	1,481
2021	134,309	– 8.8%	108,858	1,206	968

=== Population by religious denomination ===
Today, most of the population is Romanian Orthodox. Protestants and Roman Catholics represent about 5% of the population.

Confessions in Sibiu
Confession	1910	2002
Eastern Orthodox	18%	91%
Greek Catholic (Uniate)	8%	1%
Roman Catholic	20%	2%
Evangelical Lutheran	42%	2%
Reformed	7%	1%
Jewish	4%	< 1%
Other	1%	4%

== Economy ==
Sibiu is an important economic hub for Romania, with a high rate of foreign investments. It is also an important hub for the manufacturing of automotive components and houses factories belonging to ThyssenKrupp Bilstein-Compa, Takata Corporation, Continental Automotive Systems, Marquardt Group and NTN-SNR ball bearings. Other local industries are machine components, textiles, agro-industry, and electrical components (Siemens).

The city also contained Romania's second-largest stock exchange, the Sibiu Stock Exchange, which merged with the Bucharest Stock Exchange in 2018.

The main industrial activities of Sibiu take place in two industrial zones located on the outskirts of the city:

- East industrial zone (East Economic Center), alongside the railway to Brașov and Râmnicu Vâlcea
- West industrial zone (West Economic Center), near the exit to Sebeș, close to the Airport

A commercial zone located in the Șelimbăr commune plays an important role in the economy of Sibiu. It houses a mall and other large retailers.

Another factor that plays an important role in the economy of the city is tourism, which has been increasing at a steady rate since 2007.

== Transport ==
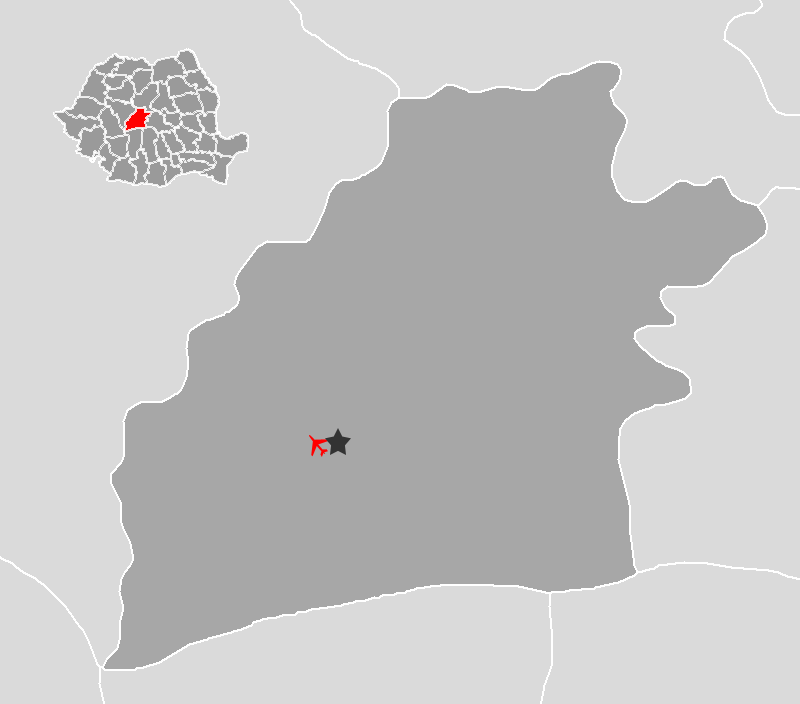
Sibiu International Airport Location

Sibiu is well served in terms of transport and infrastructure. In 2010 a city bypass was opened, significantly reducing the road traffic inside the city.

Tursib is the city's internal transportation system operator.

=== Air ===
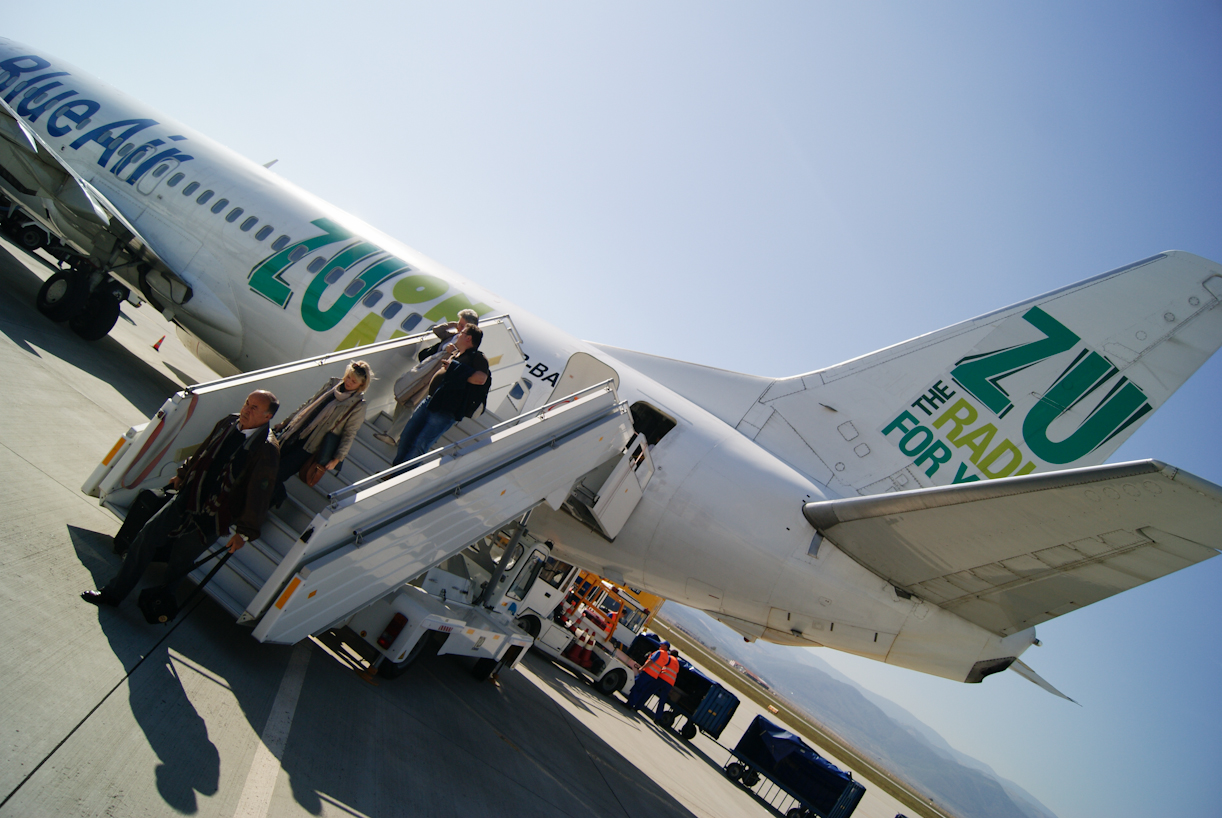
Sibiu Airport, Blue Air flight

Sibiu International Airport is one of the most modern international airports in Romania, with direct connections to Germany, Austria, United Kingdom, Ireland and Spain.

=== Road ===
Sibiu is an important node in the European road network, being on two different European routes (E68 and E81). At a national level, Sibiu is located on three different main national roads, DN1, DN7 and DN14.

The Romanian Motorway A1 will link the city with Pitești and the Romanian western border, near Arad. From the remaining 332 km (206 mi) of motorway towards the border with Hungary Nadlac, a total of 276 km (171 mi) is completed and the last 56 km (35 mi) are currently under construction, while the timeline for the segment towards Pitești is targeted for completion for the year 2025 (construction will start no sooner than 2019). Sibiu' s ring road as part of A1 motorway was completed on 1 December 2010.

Sibiu is also an important hub for the international bus links with the biggest passenger transporter in Romania, Atlassib, based here. Transport companies are also providing coach connections from Sibiu to a large number of locations in Romania.

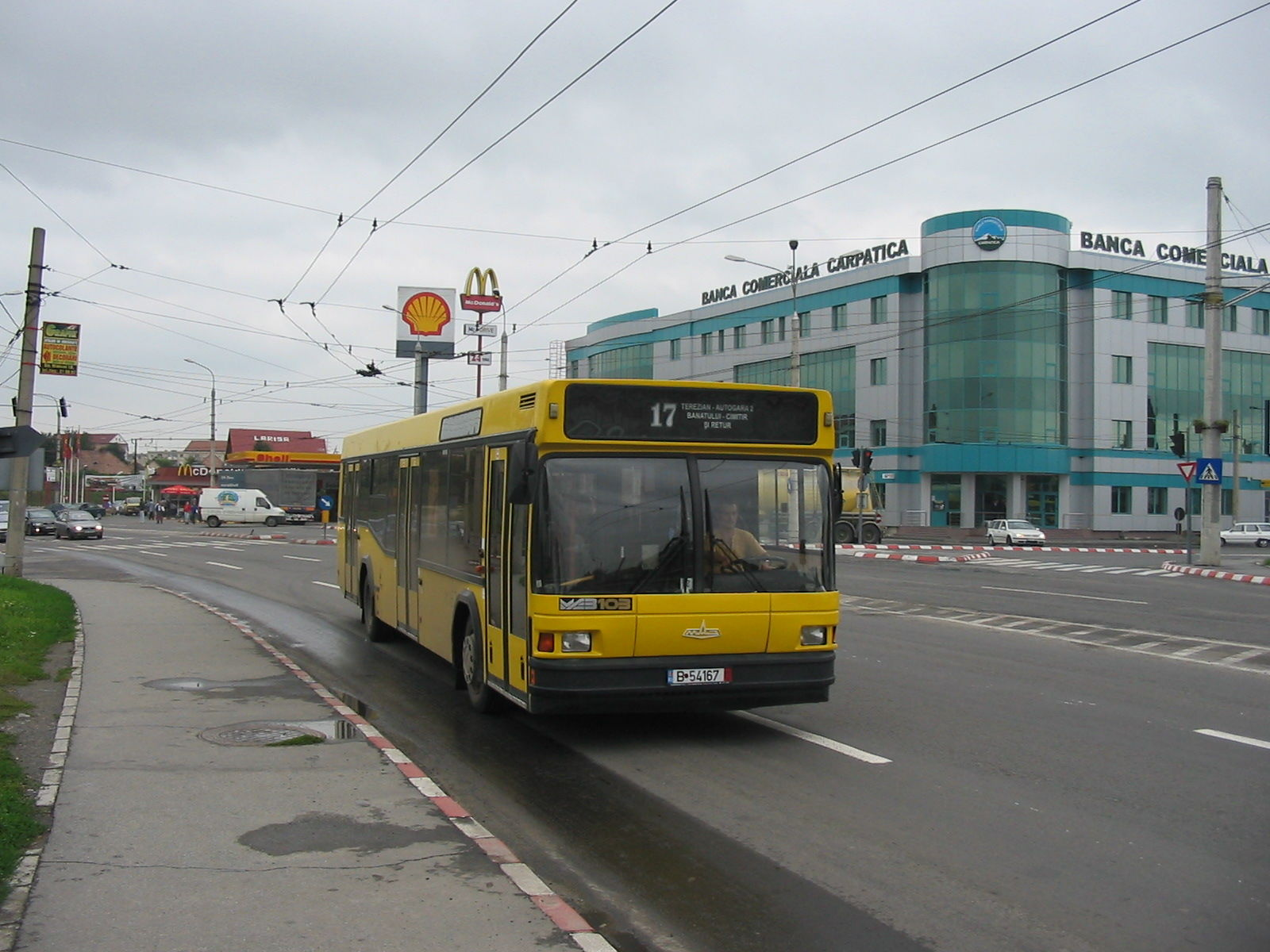
Public bus transportation in Sibiu

=== Rail ===
Sibiu is situated on the CFR-Romanian Railways Main Line 200 (Brasov – Făgăraș – Sibiu – Simeria – Arad – Romanian Western Border) and on Line 206 (Sibiu – Mediaș).

The city is served by five rail stations: the Main Station (Gara Mare), the Little Station (Gara Mică), Turnișor, Sibiu Triaj, and Halta Ateliere Zonă. It has an important diesel-powered locomotive depot and a freight terminal.

Numerous interregional trains (nicknamed Blue Arrows) connect Sibiu to other major cities in Romania: Cluj-Napoca, Brașov, Craiova, Timișoara, and Bucharest.

=== Cycling ===
Over the last six years, Sibiu has enjoyed a revival of cycling. The city has 43 kilometers of bicycle lanes. A new bike path with a completion date in 2023 will run the length of the Cibin River, creating a green corridor from the Ștrand to Broscărie neighbourhoods, via Gușterița.

Bicycle rentals have offered a boost for the local economy with several small rental centers and a bigger rental center that is administered by the I'Velo Bike Sharing group.

== Health ==
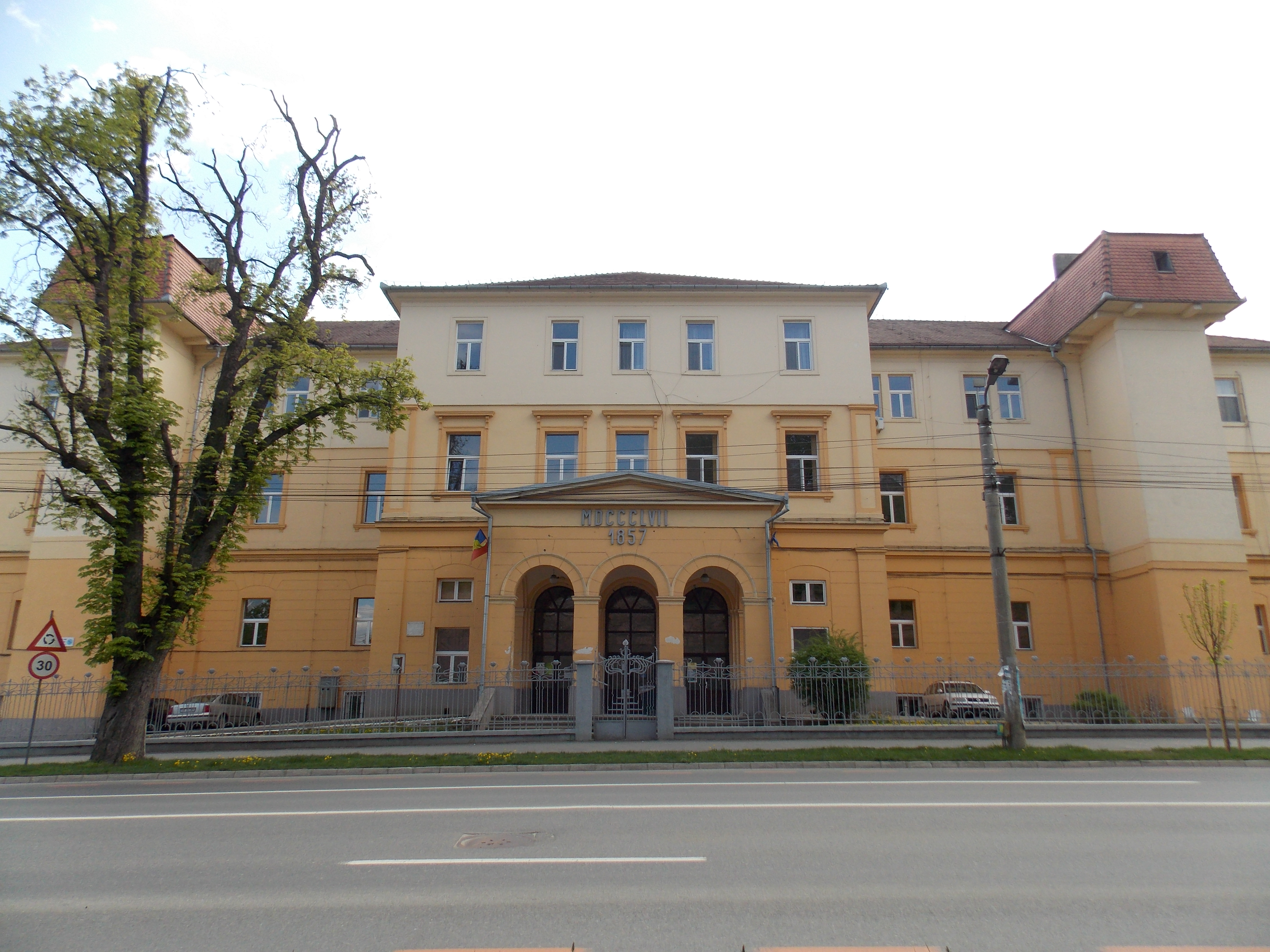
Sibiu County Hospital

Sibiu is one of the important medical centers of Romania, housing many important medical facilities:

- County Hospital
- Academic Emergency Hospital;
- Hospital of Pediatrics;
- Military Emergency Hospital;
- CFR Hospital (Romanian Railways Hospital);
- "Dr. Gheorghe Preda" Psychiatry Hospital
- other smaller private clinics

The city also houses one of the largest private hospitals in the country, Polisano.

== Education ==
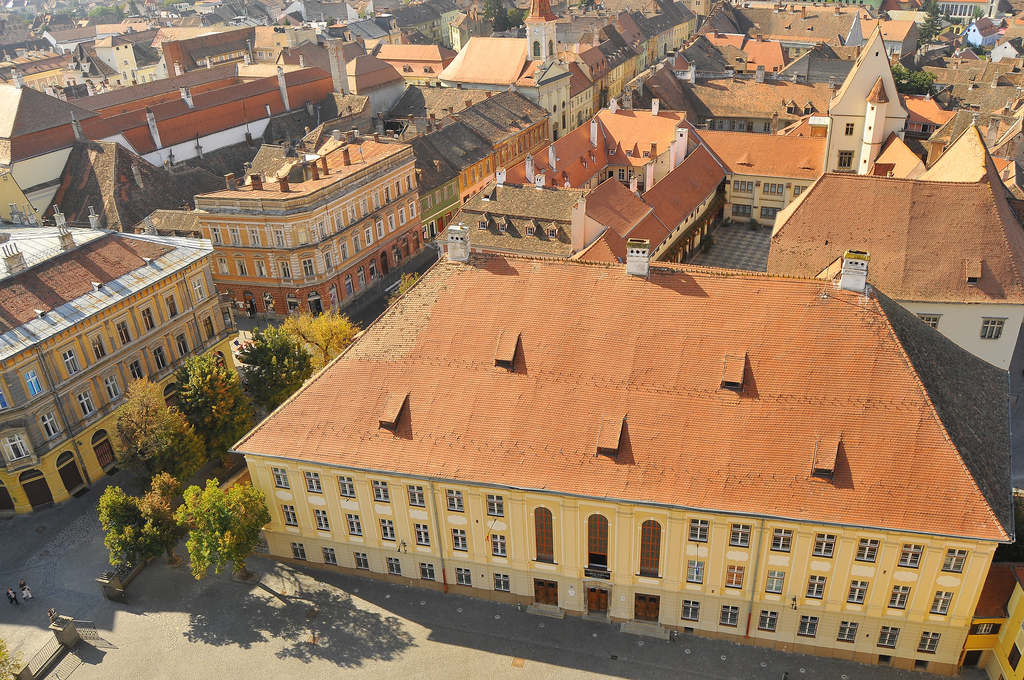
Samuel von Brukenthal High School

Sibiu is an important centre of higher education, with over 23,000 students in four public and private higher institutions.

The Lucian Blaga University of Sibiu was founded in 1990, with five faculties: Engineering and Sciences; Language Sciences; History and Law; Medicine; Food and Textile Processing Technology. Nowadays, there are 10 faculties and departments.

Sibiu also houses the Nicolae Bălcescu Land Forces Academy and the Military Foreign Language Center as well as two private universities, Romanian-German University and Alma Mater University.

In Sibiu there are 20 educational institutions on the secondary level, the most important of which are:

- Gheorghe Lazăr National College – sciences and informatics, first opened in 1692 as a Jesuit College
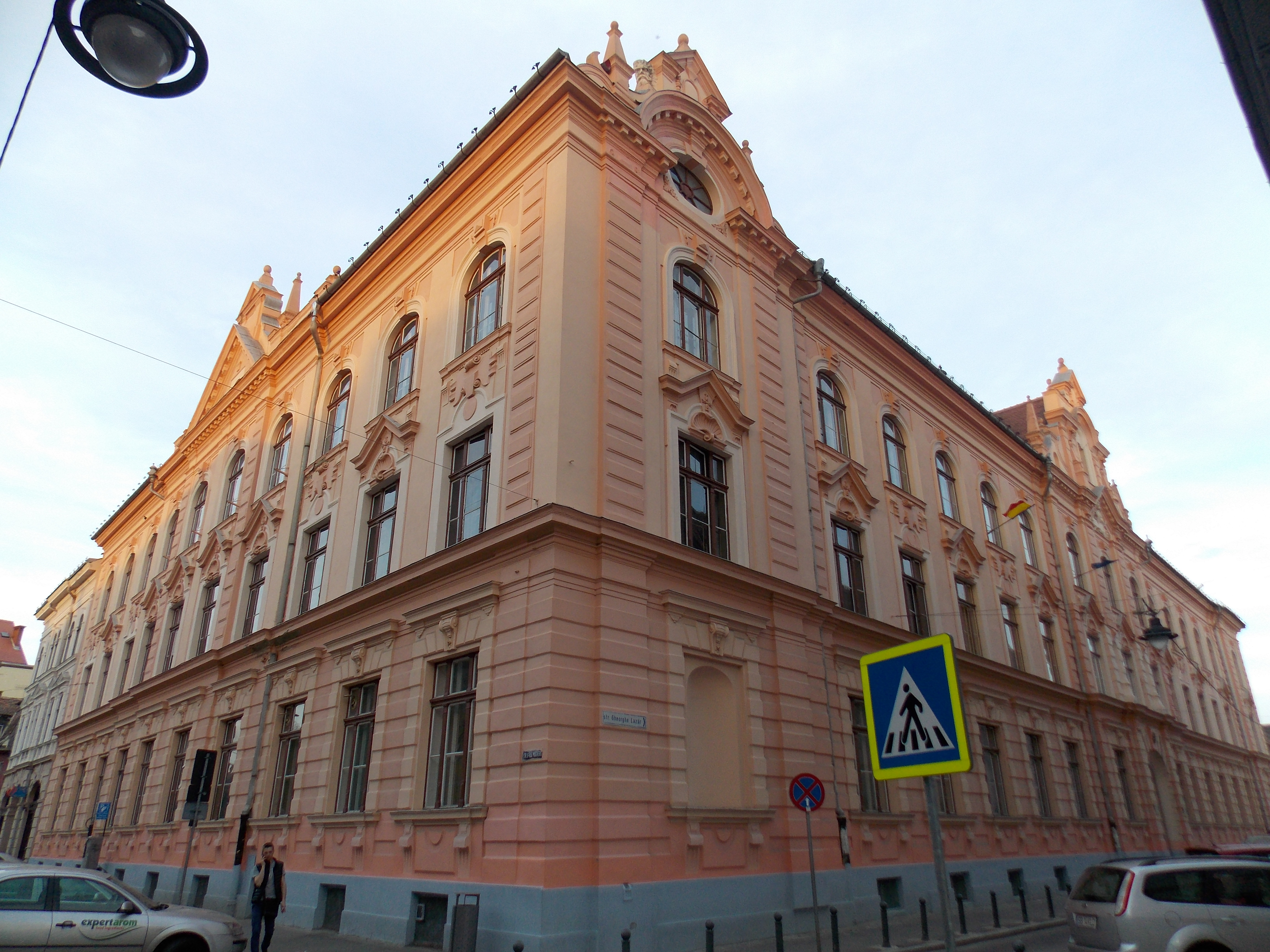
- Gheorghe Lazăr National College
  Samuel von Brukenthal National College – linguistics, sciences and informatics, German language high school
- Octavian Goga National College – social sciences, sciences, informatics and linguistics
- Onisifor Ghibu High School – informatics, sciences, sports, theater and linguistics
- Andrei Șaguna National College – training for school teachers and linguistics
- Constantin Noica High School – sciences and linguistics
- Daniel Popovici Barcianu High School – agricultural sciences
- George Baritiu National College – economic sciences

== Sports ==
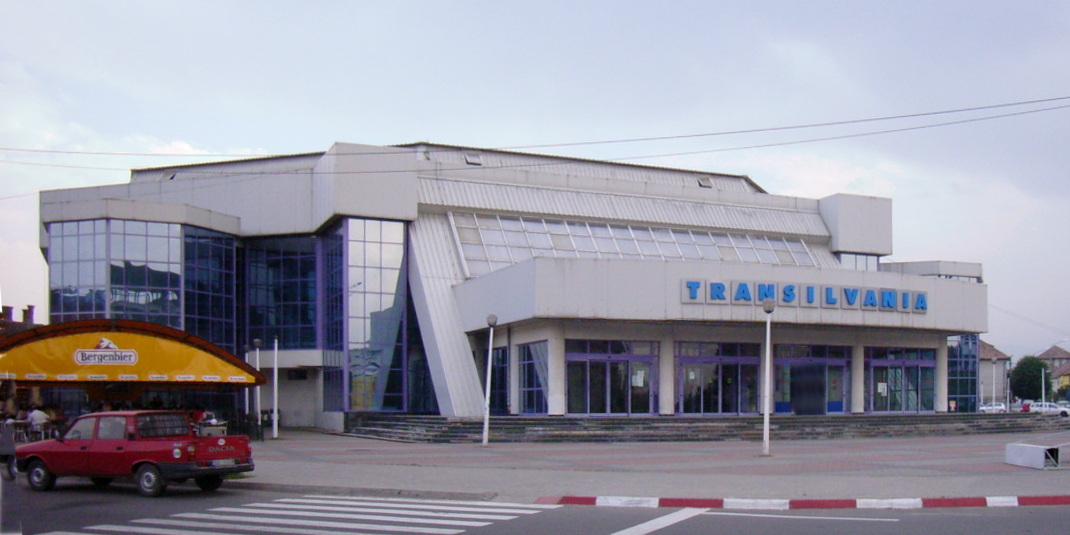
Sala Transilvania

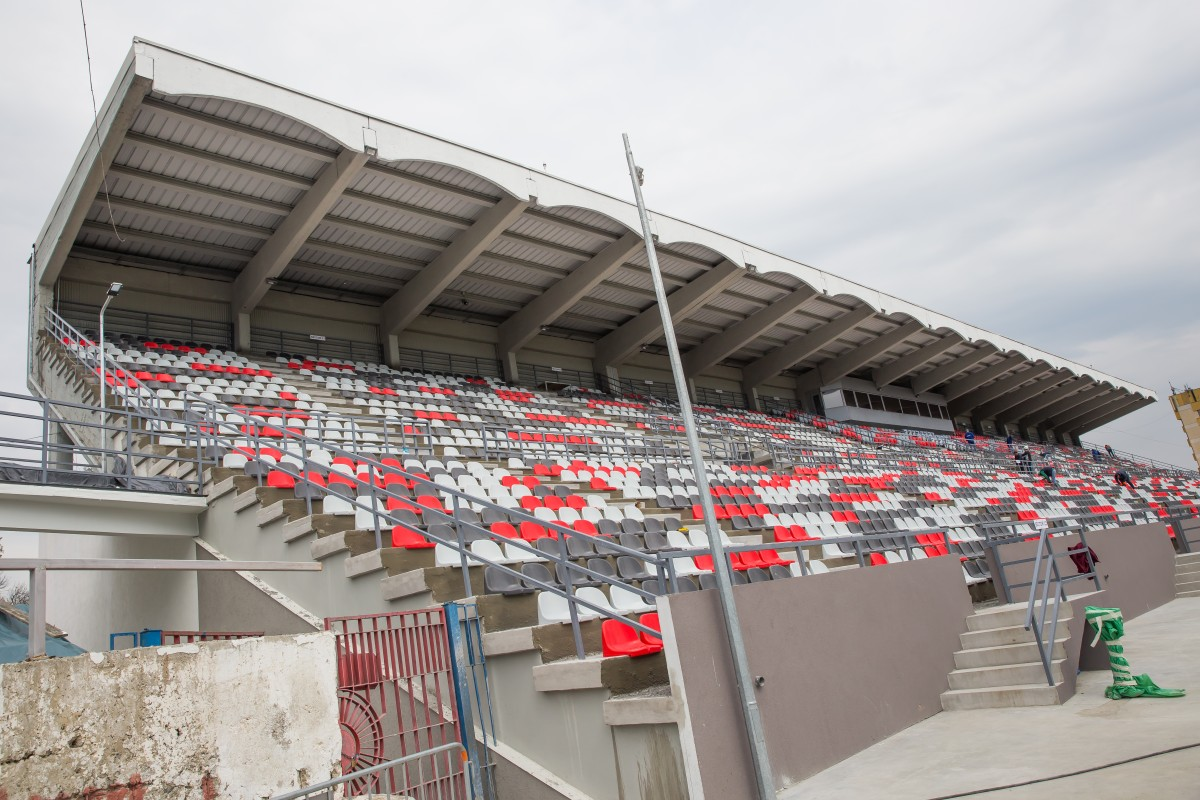
Stadionul Municipal

The city houses a football stadium, a multi-functional arena building (Sala Transilvania), a rugby court, a municipal pool and several private tennis courts.

Also, several sports international competitions are taking place every year: Sibiu Cycling Tour (in July), Red Bull Romaniacs Hard Enduro Rallye (around July), Sibiu Open (formerly held in September), Sibiu Rally (currently held in October).

Football

Sibiu has had a long football tradition, starting in 1913 with the founding of Șoimii Sibiu, which was the launchpad of Ilie Oană's career, who later became a star of FC Petrolul Ploiești. Later came Societatea Gimnastică Sibiu, a sport club of Sibiu's Transylvanian Saxon community, which's best performance was reaching the Divizia A final in the 1930–31 season. The best ever football team from Sibiu, based on performances, was Inter Sibiu, which had finished 4th after the 1990–91 season and had won the Balkans Cup during the same season. During the 21st century, the city has been represented by FC Sibiu and Voința Sibiu (of which only the latter has reached Liga I). Currently, FC Hermannstadt is the only major football team representing Sibiu, playing in the top level of the Romanian football pyramid, the Superliga, season 2022–2023. Starting with the 10th of December 2022, the team's home ground is the rebuilt 13000 seats Sibiu main stadium in the Sub Arini Park, the Stadionul Municipal Sibiu, the inaugural match ending with a 4–0 victory over first placed Farul Constanța.

Basketball

CSU Sibiu, one of the best Romanian basketball teams at the moment, represents Sibiu in the top tier of Romanian basketball, Liga Națională.

Handball

The city's handball team is called CSM Sibiu. Additionally, the nearby town of Cisnădie has a women's team in the first league, CS Măgura.

Rugby

- CSM Sibiu

Volleyball

- CSM Sibiu (men)
- CSS Sibiu (women)

Speed Skating

- CSS Sibiu

== Natives ==
- Michael Gottlieb Agnethler, botanist
- Alexandru Apolzan, football player
- Lucia Apolzan, ethnographer
- Arthur Arz von Straussenburg, Austro-Hungarian general
- Florin Barbu, bass player
- Claudiu Baștea, judoka
- Ion Besoiu, Romanian actor
- Miklós Borsos, Hungarian sculptor
- Dan Burincă, Olympic artistic gymnast
- Andrei Codrescu, American writer
- Sabina Cojocar, Romanian gymnast
- Alexandru Curtean, football player
- Florin Diacu, Romanian-Canadian mathematician
- Steve Holmes, German pornographic actor
- Victor Iliu, Romanian film director
- Klaus Iohannis, 5th President of Romania
- Hermann Kusmanek von Burgneustädten, Austro-Hungarian general
- Mircea Mureșan, Romanian film director
- Alexandru Mușina, Romanian poet
- Steliana Nistor, Romanian gymnast
- Hermann Oberth, space flight technology pioneer
- Nicolaus Olahus, Catholic archbishop of Esztergom
- Valerian Onițiu, chess problemist
- Oskar Pastior, poet and translator
- Dan Perjovschi, Romanian artist
- Claudia Presecan, Romanian gymnast
- Erna Rubinstein, Hungarian violinist
- Iancu Sasul, Moldavian ruler
- Tobias Stranover, Transylvanian Saxon painter
- Sebastian Suciu, Romanian politician
- Jenő Szemák, Hungarian jurist
- Viorel Tilea, Romanian diplomat
- Melania Ursu, stage and film actress
- Radu Vasile, politician, Prime Minister of Romania
- Delia Velculescu, Romanian-American economist
- Adele Zay, Transylvanian Saxon teacher

== International relations ==
=== Twin towns ===
Sibiu has twinning agreements with:

- Bauru, Brazil, since 1995.
- Butuan, Philippines
- (United States) Columbia, Missouri, USA, since 1994.
- Deventer, Netherlands, since 2007.
- Klagenfurt, Austria, since 1990.
- Landshut, Germany, since 2002.
- Marburg, Germany, since 2005.
- Mechelen, Belgium, since 1996.
- Rennes, France, since 1999.
- Valencia, Venezuela, since 1993.
- Wirral, United Kingdom, since 1994.
- Takayama, Gifu, Japan, since 2009.
- Durham, North Carolina, United States, since 2019

=== Consulates ===
The following countries have consulates in Sibiu:

- Germany – Consulate-General
- Austria – Honorary consulate
- Luxembourg – Honorary consulate
- Malta – Honorary consulate

== Gallery ==
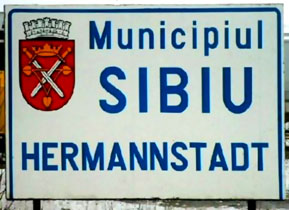
Bilingual Romanian-German sign at the entrance in Sibiu/Hermannstadt

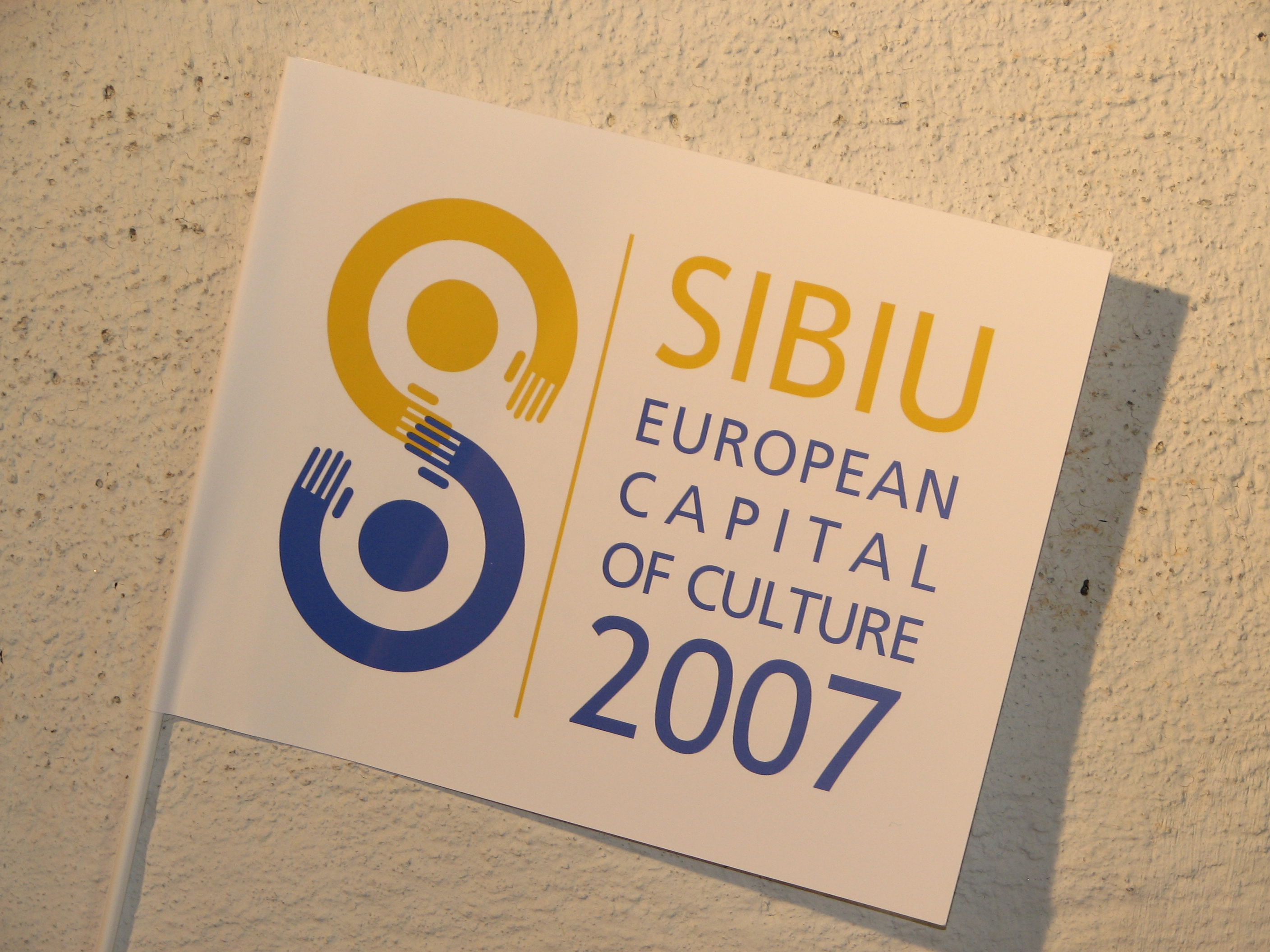
Small flag with Sibiu as former European Capital of Culture in 2007

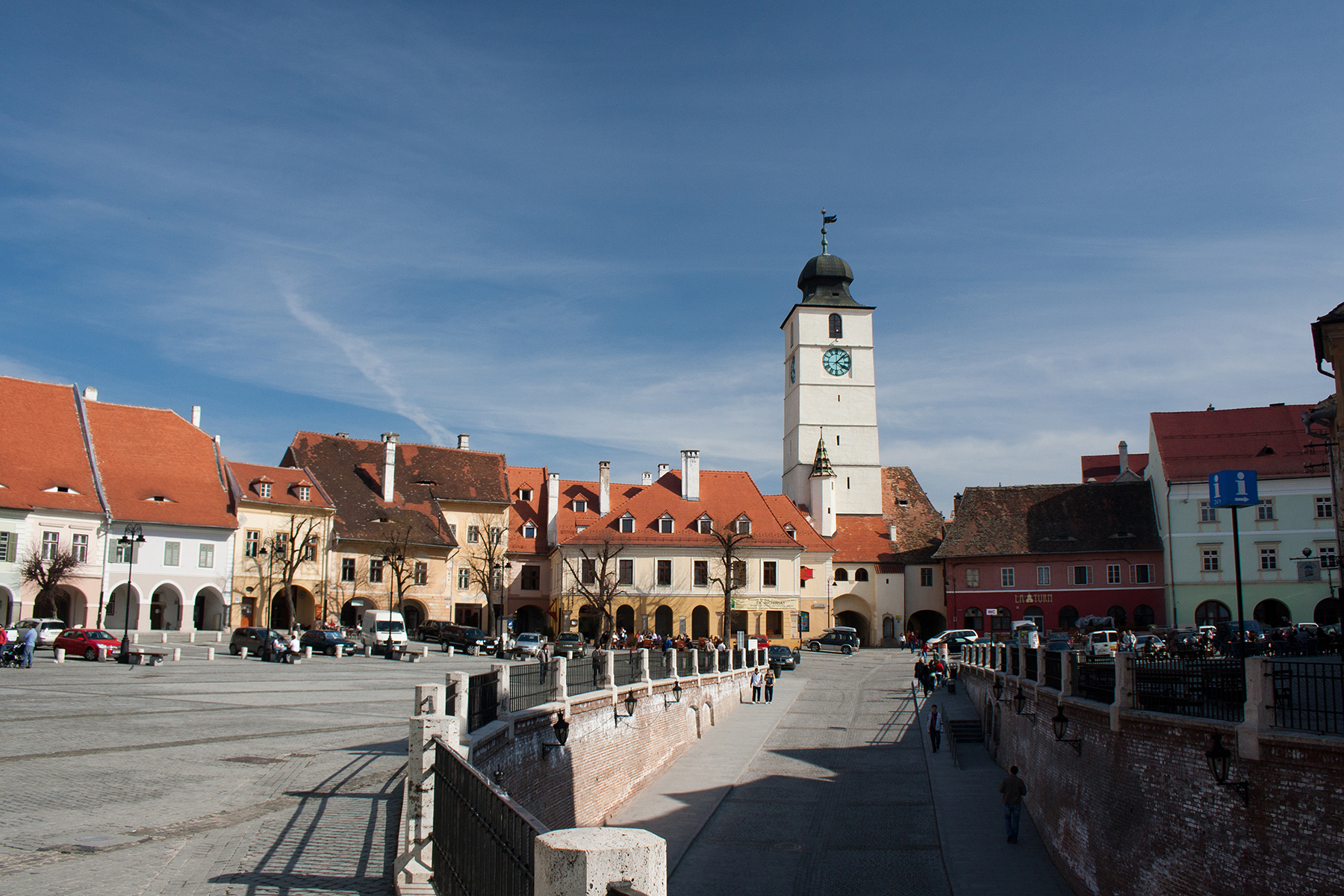
Turnul Sfatului in Small Square

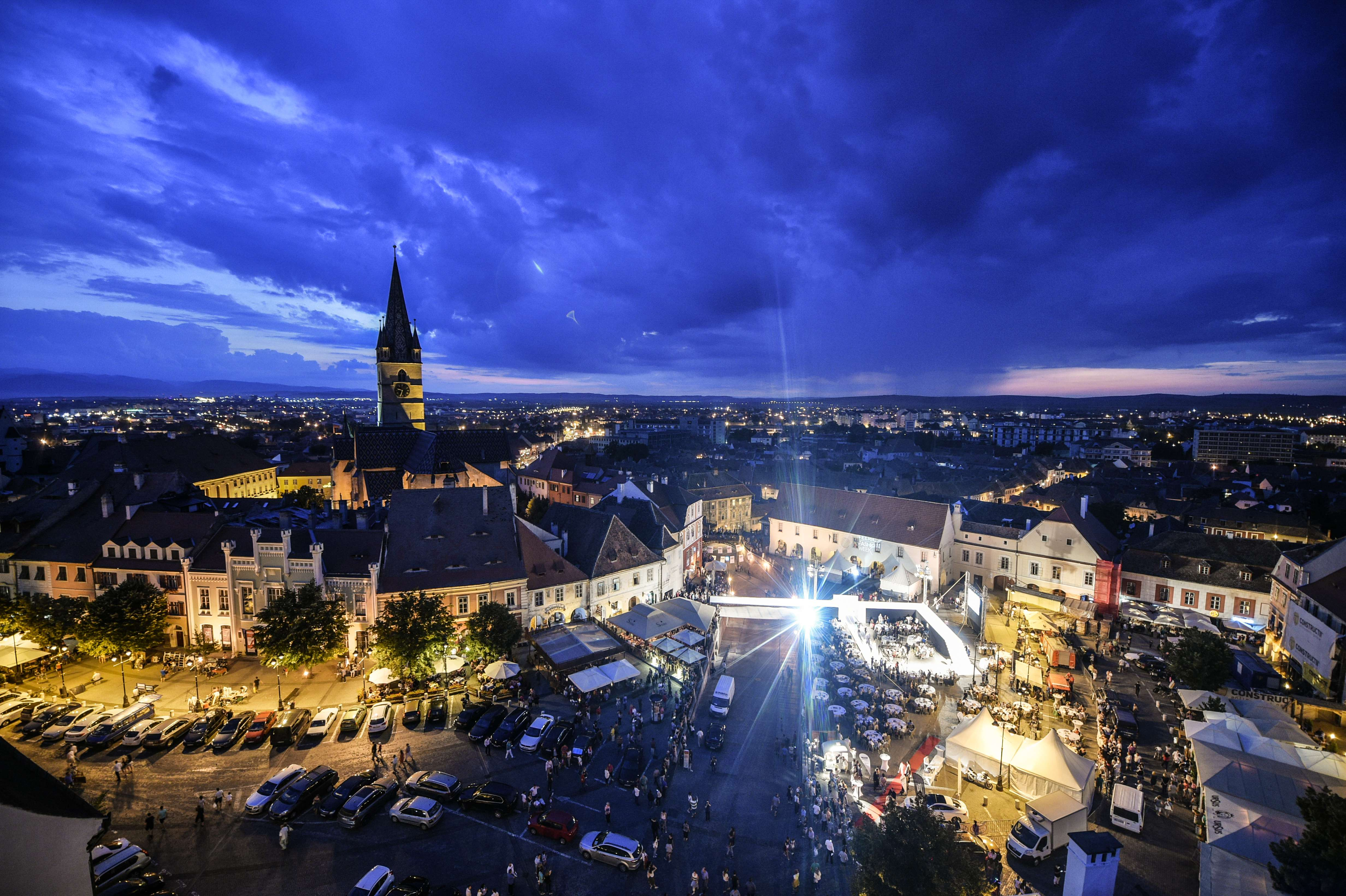
The Small Square of Sibiu, during Feeric Fashion Week closing gala - 2016

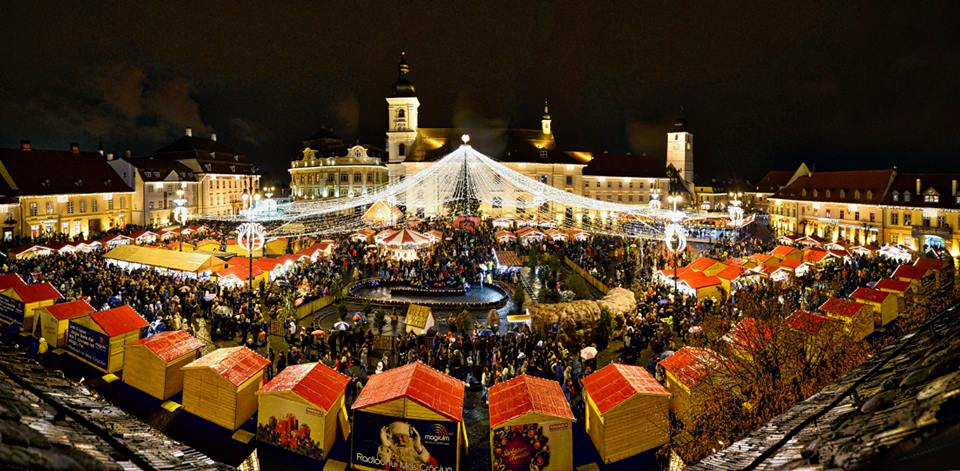
The Large Square during Christmas

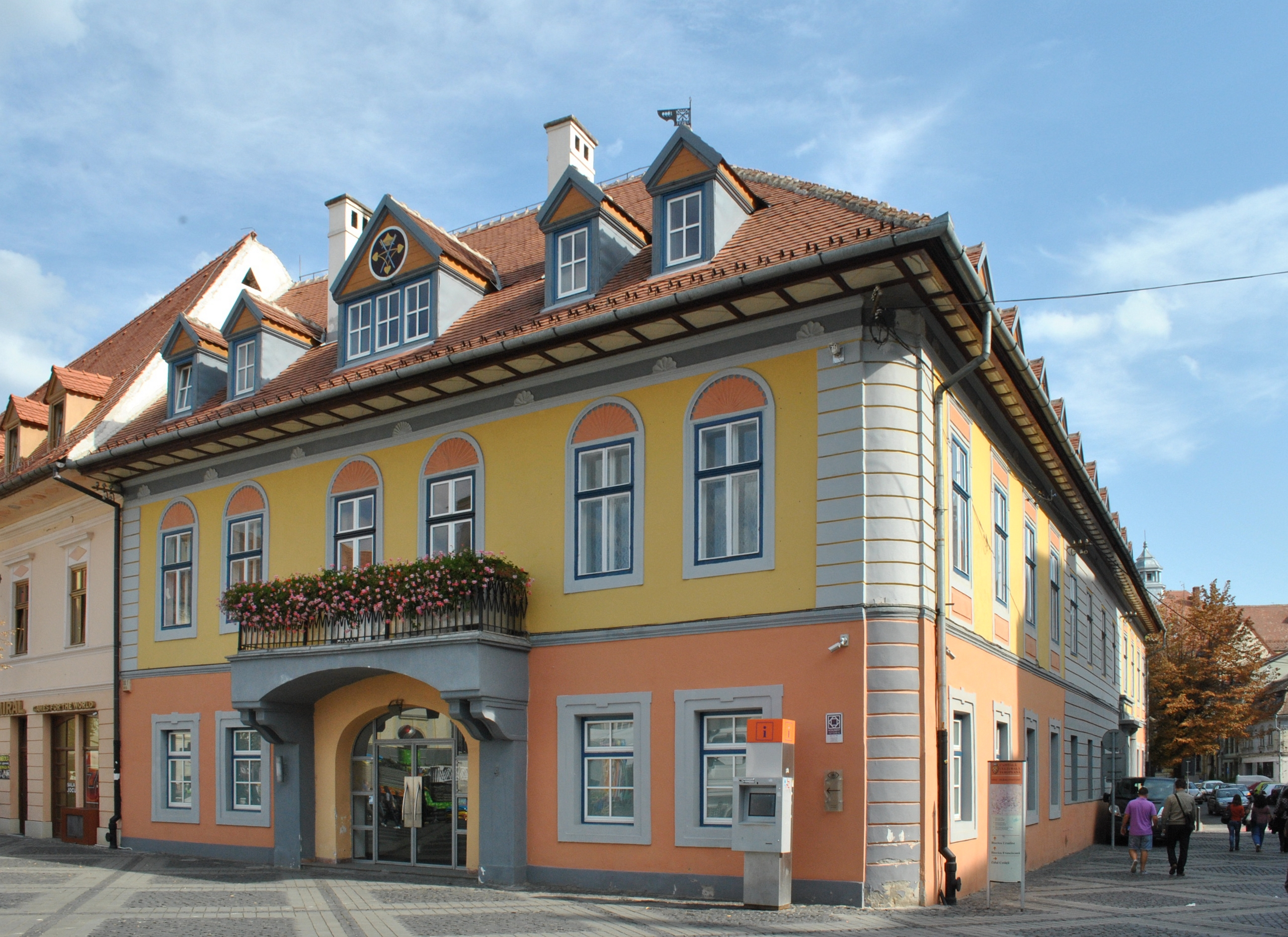
Lutsch House, the headquarters of the local branch of FDGR/DFDR

== See also ==
- List of castles in Romania
- Timeline of Sibiu
- Tourism in Romania
- Seven Wonders of Romania
- Villages with fortified churches in Transylvania
