= List of hotels: Countries M =

This is a list of what are intended to be the notable top hotels by country, five or four star hotels, notable skyscraper landmarks or historic hotels which are covered in multiple reliable publications. It should not be a directory of every hotel in every country:

== Macau ==
- Crown Towers
- East Asia Hotel
- Grand Lisboa
- Hotel Lisboa
- Mandarin Oriental Macau
- MGM Grand Macau
- The Venetian Macao
- Wynn Macau
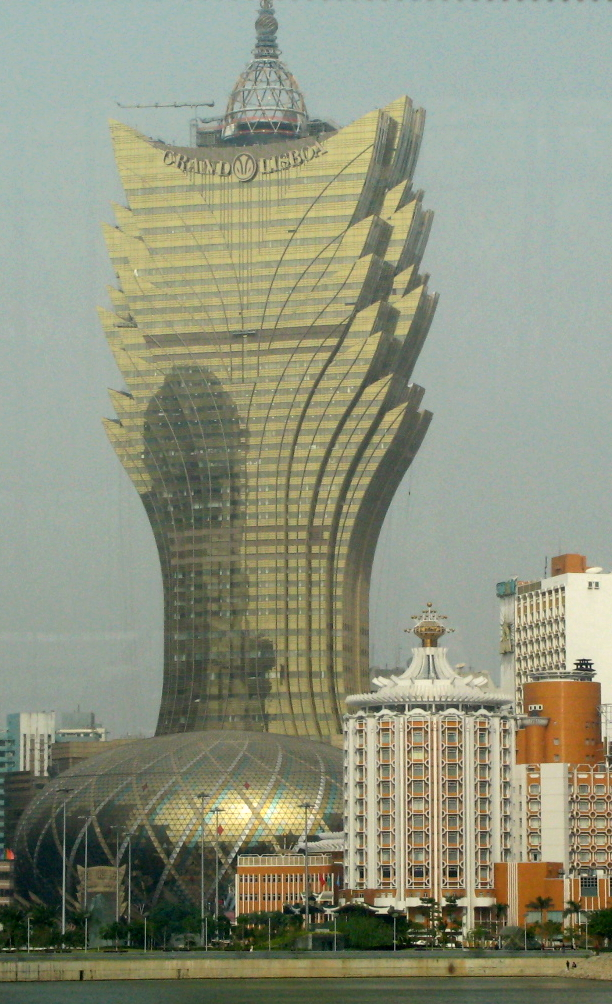
Grand Lisboa

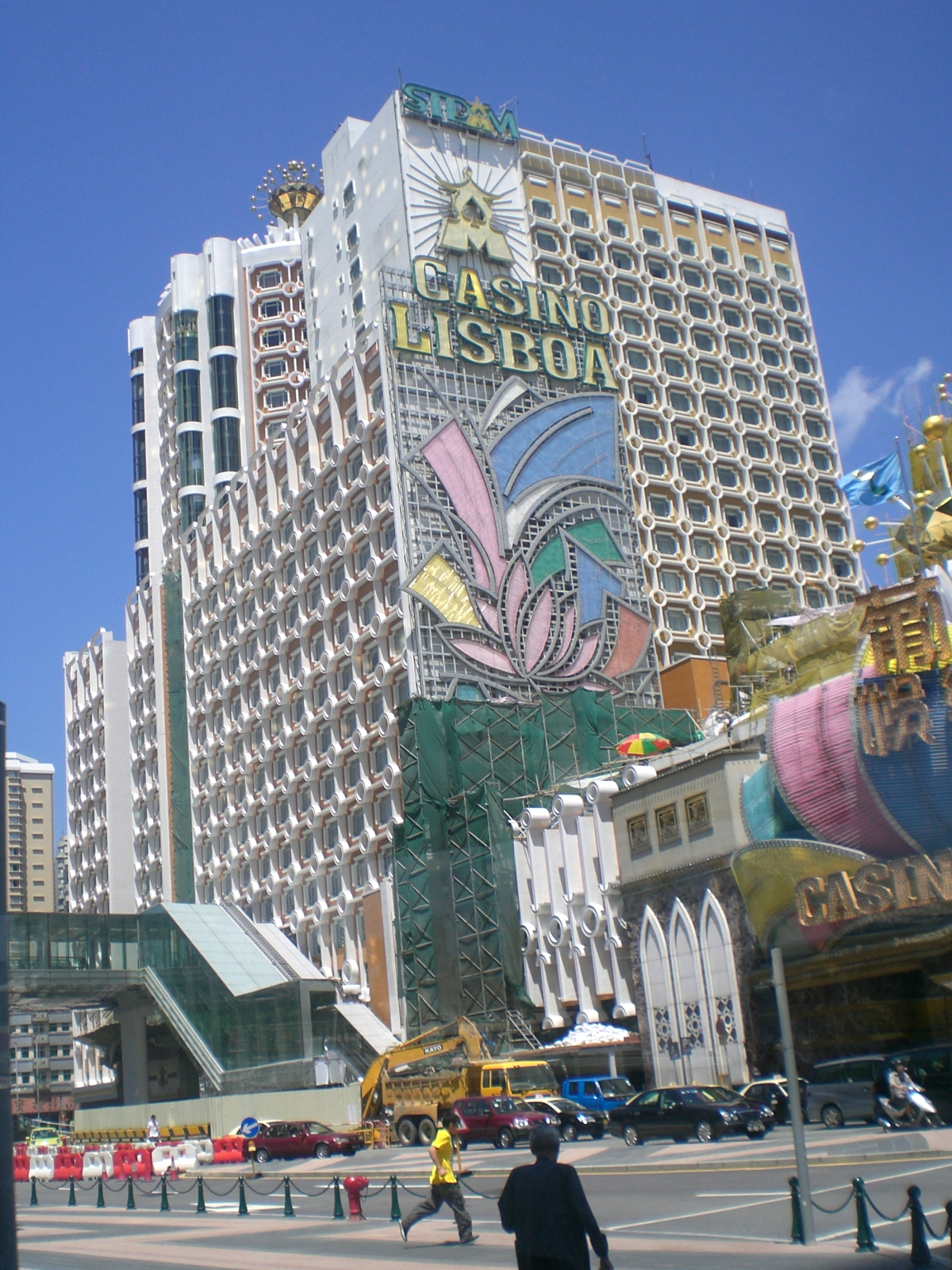
Hotel Lisboa

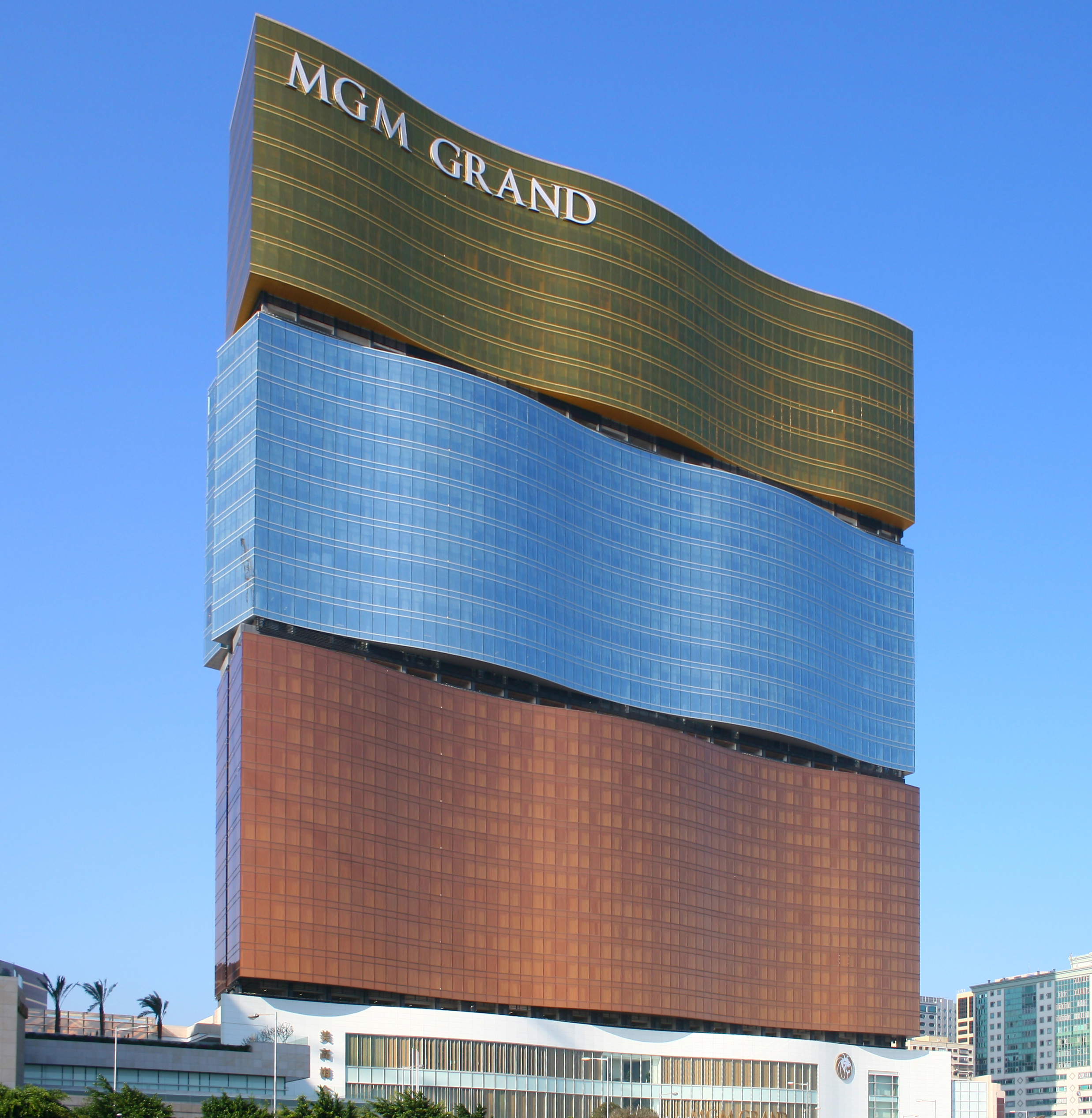
MGM Grand Macau

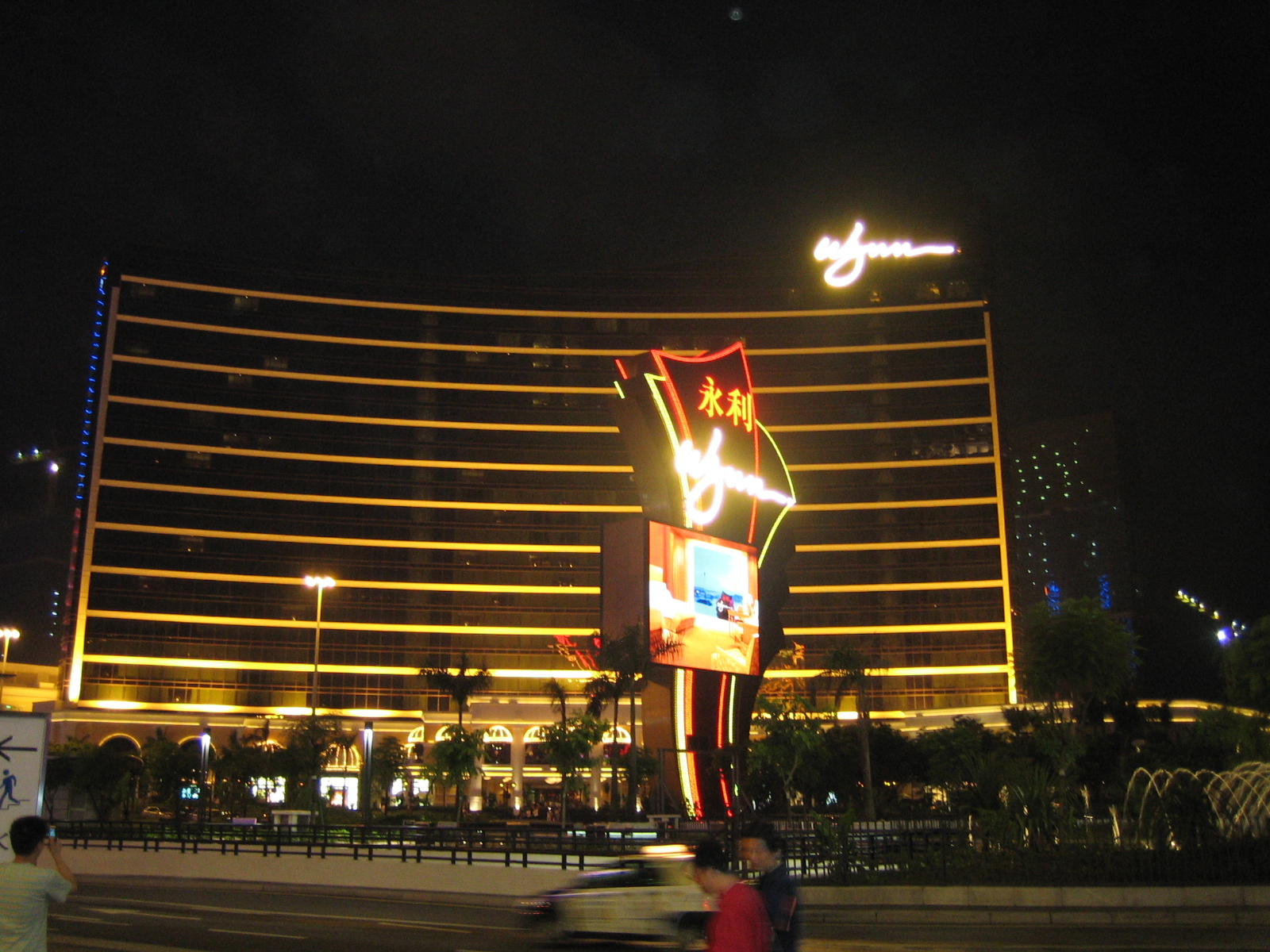
Wynn Macau

== Madagascar ==
- Hotel Carlton Madagascar (formerly Hilton Tana Antananarivo)

== Madeira ==
- Hotel Reid's Palace

== Malawi ==
- Lilongwe Hotel, Lilongwe

== Malaysia ==
- Carcosa Seri Negara, Kuala Lumpur
- Cathay Hotel, Penang
- Eastern & Oriental Hotel, Penang
- The Federal Kuala Lumpur, Kuala Lumpur
- First World Hotel, Genting Highlands
- Genting Grand Hotel, Genting Highlands
- Four Points by Sheraton, Kuching
- Highlands Hotel, Genting Highlands
- JW Marriott Kuala Lumpur, Kuala Lumpur
- Miri Marriott Resort & Spa, Miri
- Renaissance Kuala Lumpur Hotel, Kuala Lumpur
- Ritz-Carlton Kuala Lumpur, Kuala Lumpur
- Shangri-La Kuala Lumpur, Kuala Lumpur
- Tanjung Sanctuary, Langkawi
- The Datai Langkawi, Langkawi
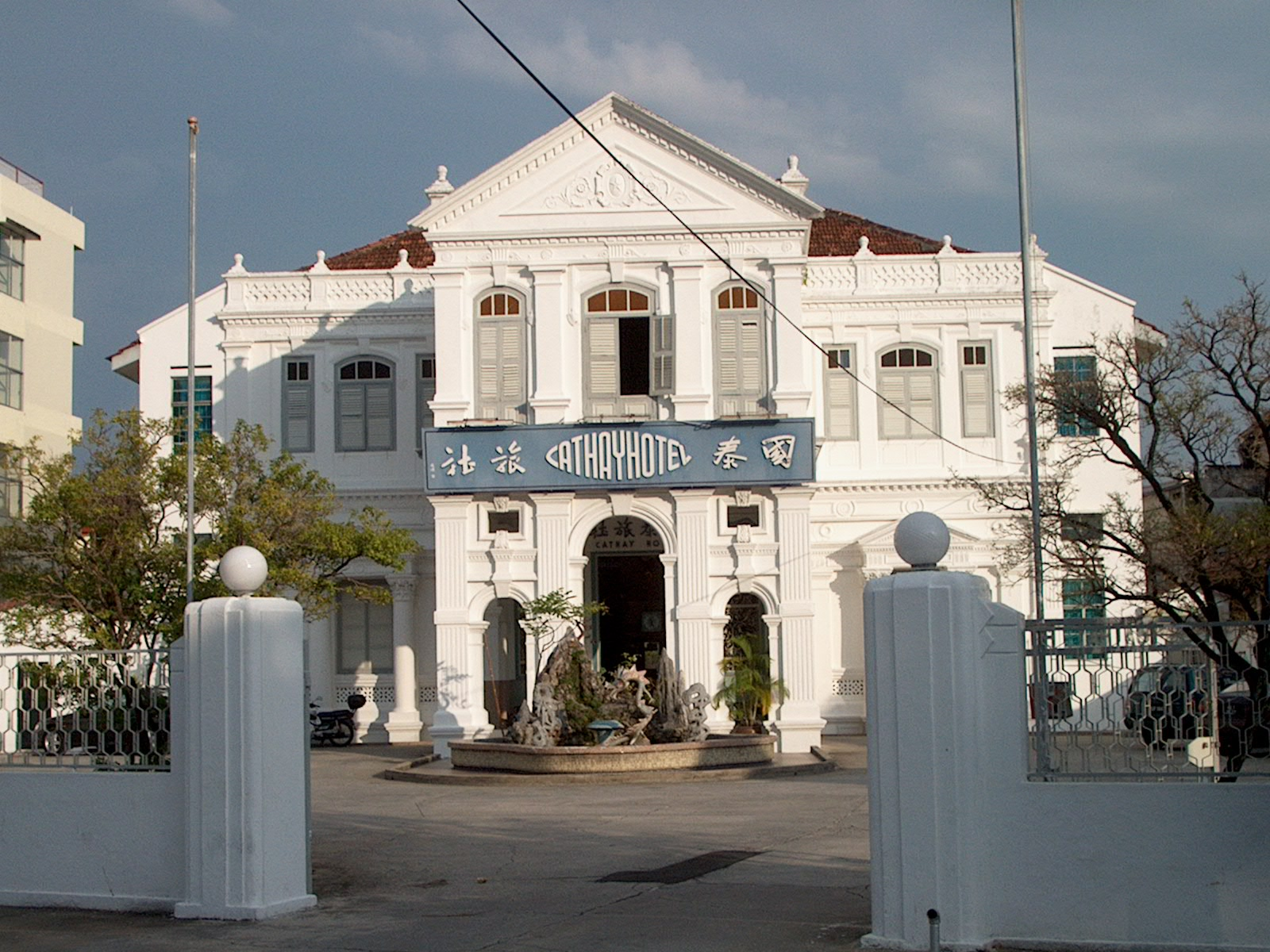
Cathay Hotel

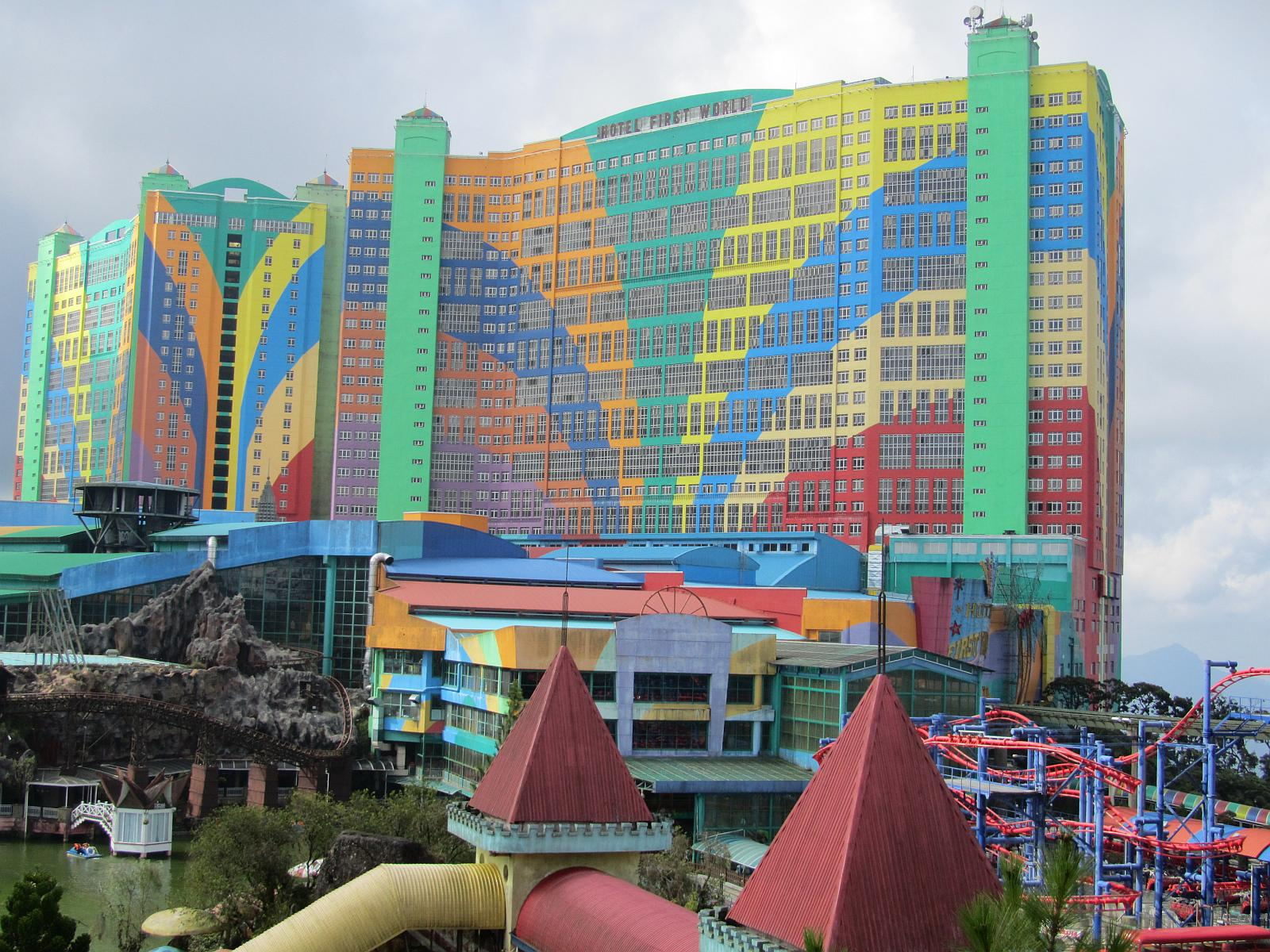
First world Hotel

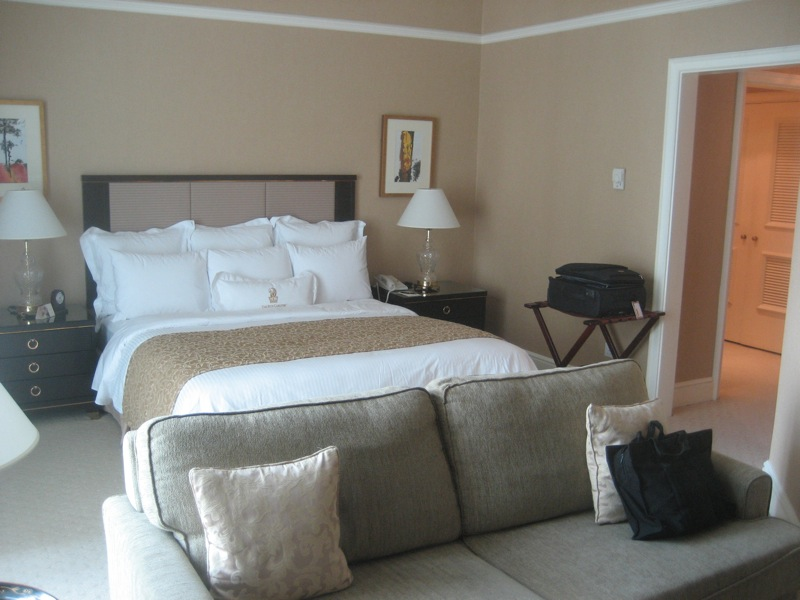
Ritz-Carlton Kuala Lumpur

== Maldives ==
- Huvafen Fushi, North Malé Atoll
- Paradise Island Resort, Malé
- Traders Hotel, Malé

== Marquesas Islands ==
- Auberge Hitikau, Ua Huka

== Monaco ==
- Fairmont Monte Carlo
- Hotel de Paris
- Hotel Hermitage

== Mongolia ==
- Hotel Mongolia, Ulaanbaatar
- Ulaanbaatar Hotel, Ulaanbaatar

== Montenegro ==
- Hilton Podgorica Crna Gora, Podgorica
- Hotel Mediteran, Ulcinj
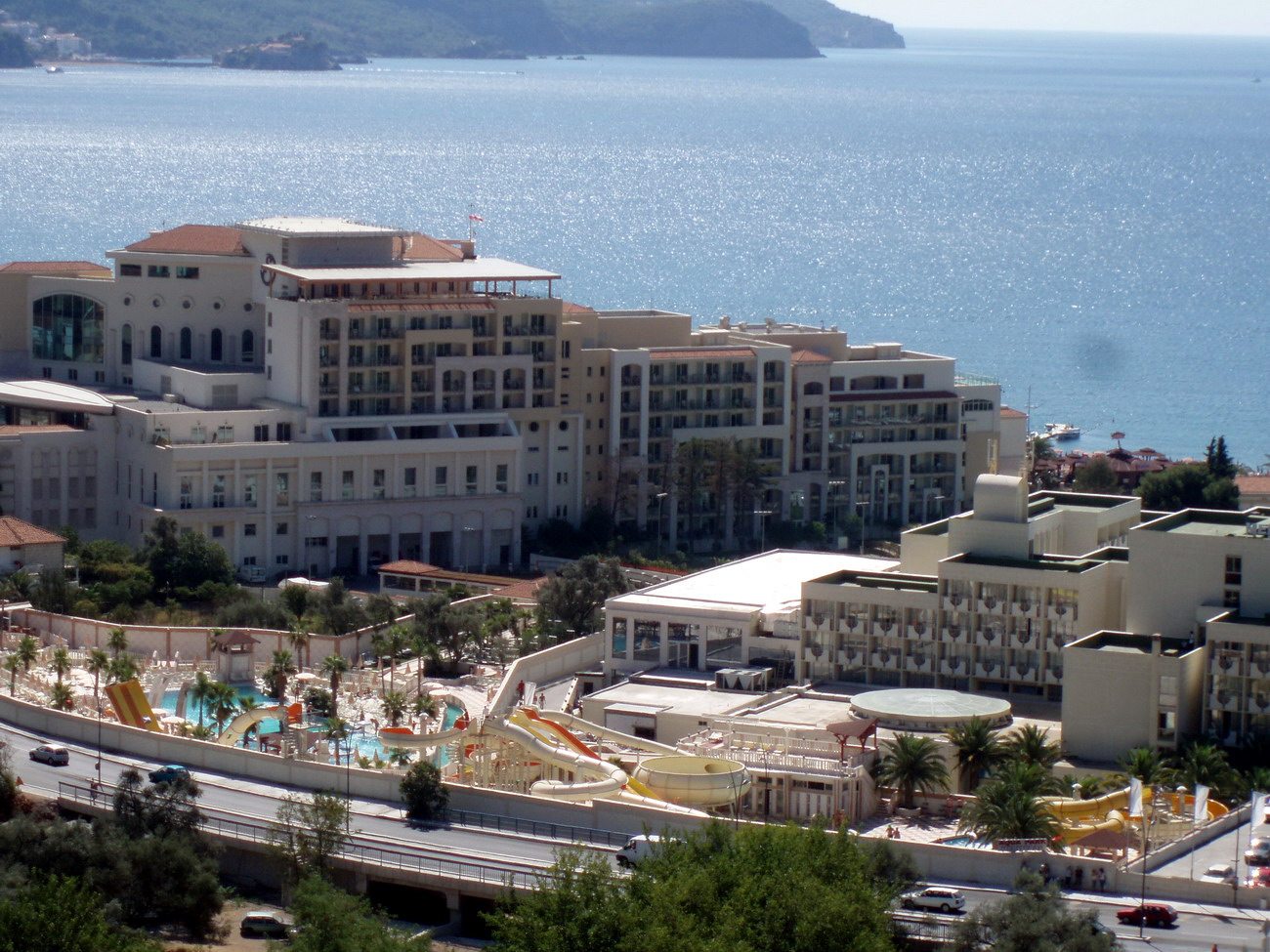
Hotel Splendid

== Morocco ==
=== Casablanca ===
- Hyatt Regency Casablanca
- Sheraton Casablanca Hotel & Towers

=== Tangier ===
- Hotel Continental, Tangier

== Mozambique ==
- Grande Hotel Beira, Beira
