= Hotel Continental (disambiguation) =

The Hôtel Continental is the former name of a hotel in Paris, France, now known as The Westin Paris – Vendôme.

Hotel Continental may also refer to:

- Hotel Continental, Hanko, Finland, now the Hotel Regatta
- Hotel Continental Saigon, Ho Chi Minh City, Vietnam
- Hotel Continental, Oslo, Norway
- Hotel Continental Sibiu, Romania
- Hotel Continental (Tangier), Morocco
- Hotel Continental (film), a 1932 American film
- Continental Hotel, Sorrento, Victoria, Australia

== See also ==
- Continental Hotels, Romanian hotel chain
- IHG Hotels & Resorts (InterContinental Hotels Group), British hotel chain
- InterContinental, Pan-Am subsidiary U.S. hotel chain
- Hotel Inter-Continental Kabul, Afghanistan, unaffiliated with the U.S. hotel chain
- The Continental (disambiguation)
