= The Continental =

The Continental may refer to:

== Arts and entertainment ==
- The Continental (1952 TV series), a 1952–53 television series on CBS
- The Continental: From the World of John Wick, a 2023 television series on Peacock
- "The Continental" (Saturday Night Live), a recurring sketch on the NBC program
- "The Continental" (song), a popular song and winner of the first Academy Award for Best Song in 1934
- "The Continental", a song by Prince from the Love Symbol Album
- The Continental, a 1987 film directed by John Godber and Martin Shardlow
- The Continental, a fictional hotel in the John Wick franchise

== Other uses ==
- The Continental (U.S. Supreme Court case), a U.S. Supreme Court case of 1872; see volume # 81, case # 345
- Hook Continental, a passenger train running between London's Liverpool Street Station and Harwich Parkestone Quay

== See also ==
- Continental (disambiguation)
- Hotel Continental (disambiguation)
