= Timeline of Sibiu =

The following is a timeline of the history of the city of Sibiu, Transylvania, Romania.

== Before the 17th century ==
- Antiquity – Roman fort called Cedonia
- 12th c. – Area settled by Hermann of Nuremberg.
- 1191 – Mentioned for the first time in the documents under the name Cibin and Cibinium when Pope Celestine III confirmed the existence of the free prepositure of the Saxons in Transylvania (due to the Cibin River that flows through the city)
- 1241 – Sibiu is sacked by the invading Mongols; Hungarian army loses a major battle on April 11
- 1292 – The first hospital in the Kingdom of Hungary was attested.
- 1324 – First Rathaus(town hall) is documented, current address Piaţa Mică 31.
- 1380 – The first documented school in the Kingdom of Hungary.
- 1438 – Town besieged by Turkish forces.
- 1442 – The Battle of Hermannstadt fought March 18–25 between the army of the Hungarian Kingdom under John Hunyadi and the Ottoman Turks
- 1494 – The first pharmacy in the Kingdom of Hungary.
- 1520 – Catholic church finished, it later became the Sibiu Lutheran Cathedral.
- 1534 – The first paper mill in the Kingdom of Hungary.
- 1544 – The first book in the Romanian language was printed in Sibiu, funded by John II Sigismund Zápolya. This was in Cyrillic letters.
- 1545 – Rathaus (town hall) in use.
- 1551 – Conrad Haas's experiment with rockets.
- 1570 – The Ottoman-dependent Principality of Transylvania was formed after the Ottoman conquest in Hungary.
- 1588 – Tower built on the Grosse Ring.

== 17th–19th centuries ==
- 1671 – Methane gas was discovered near Sibiu.
- 1699 – Town becomes capital of Principality of Transylvania.
- 1717 – Town's brewery is opened, first of the present territory of Romania.
- 1726 – Jesuit Church established.
- 1769 – The first hall for theater opens in the home of Baron von Möringer in Piața Mare (Blue House, 5 Piața Mare). It operated between 1769 and 1783
- 1782 – Franz-Joseph Müller von Reichenstein discovered the chemical element tellurium.
- 1787 – Brukenthal National Museum built as a Palace.
- 1788 – First theatre in Transylvania.
- 1789 - Annunciation Church, Sibiu built.
- 1795 – The first lightning rod in Transylvania and in Southeastern Europe was installed in Cisnădie (formerly Nagydisznód).
- 1817 – Brukenthal Museum opens.
- 1849 – Austrian-Hungarian-Russian conflict.
- 1861 – Transylvanian Association for Romanian Literature and the Culture of the Romanian People headquartered in Sibiu.
- 1867 – The Principality of Transylvania was incorporated into Hungary in the dual monarchy of Austria-Hungary
- 1872 – The first railway opened between Sibiu and Copșa Mică
- 1891 – Population: 21,465.
- 1896 – The first use of electricity in Austria-Hungary, and the first power line in Southeastern Europe.
- 1900 – Population: 26,077.

== 20th century ==
- 1904 – The second city in Europe to use an electric-powered trolley.
- 1905 – The Electric Tram is inaugurated(replacing the trolley)
- 1918 – Upon the Union of Transylvania with Romania, Sibiu became part of Romania.
- 1927 – Stadionul Municipal (stadium) opens.
- 1928 – The first zoo in Romania.
- 1940
  - University of Cluj relocates to Sibiu temporarily.
  - Sibiu Literary Circle active.
- 1941 – Saxons lost their historical majority in the population
- 1948 – Population: 60,602.
- 1959 – Sibiu Airport terminal in use.
- 1964 – Population: 102,959.
- 1977 – Population: 151,120.
- 1985 – Hotel Continental Sibiu in business.
- 1989 – The third city to take part in the Romanian Revolution.
- 1990 - Lucian Blaga University of Sibiu founded.
- 1993
  - Sibiu International Theatre Festival
  - Museum of Universal Ethnography opens.
- 1994 – Sibiu Stock Exchange established.
- 2000 – Klaus Iohannis becomes mayor.

== 21st century ==
- 2007
  - Sibiu International Airport renovated.
  - City designated a European Capital of Culture.
- 2011 – Population: 147,245; county 375,992.
- 2011 – The 17.5 km of motorway forming a partial beltway around Sibiu was fully completed on August 30.
- 2012 – Host of the NATO Military Committee Conference

== See also ==
- Other names of Sibiu
- Veges, a family originating from the Sibiu area

== Bibliography ==
- A. A. Paton (1861). "Herrmanstadt". Researches on the Danube and the Adriatic. Contributions to the modern history of Hungary and Translvania, Dalmatia and Croatia, Servia and Bulgaria. Leipzig: Brockhaus. hdl:2027/hvd.32044017982406.
- Charles Boner (1865), "Hermannstadt", Transylvania, London: Longmans, Green, Reader, and Dyer, OCLC 4572134
- David Kay (1880), "Principal Towns: Hermannstadt", Austria-Hungary, Foreign Countries and British Colonies, London: Sampson Low, Marston, Searle, & Rivington, hdl:2027/mdp.39015030647005
- Adressbuch der k. freien Stadt Hermannstadt [Directory of the Imperial Free City of Hermannstadt] (in German). Hermannstadt: W. Krafft. 1898.
- "Hermannstadt", Chambers's Encyclopaedia, London: W. & R. Chambers, 1901
- "Hermannstadt", Türkei, Rumänien, Serbien, Bulgarien [Turkey, Romania, Serbia, Bulgaria], Meyers Reisebücher (in German) (6th ed.), Leipzig: Bibliographisches Institut, 1902, hdl:2027/njp.32101064637836
- Corneliu Diaconovich [in Romanian], ed. (1904). "Sibiiu". Enciclopedia Română [Romanian Encyclopedia] (in Romanian). Vol. 3. Sibiiu: W. Krafft.
- "Hermannstadt", Austria-Hungary, Including Dalmatia and Bosnia, Leipzig: Karl Baedeker, 1905, OCLC 344268
- "Nagyszeben" . Encyclopædia Britannica. Vol. 19 (11th ed.). 1910. p. 152.
- Daniel Habit (2013). "Peripheral ECOCs between cultural policy and cultural governance: the case of Sibiu 2007". In Kiran Klaus Patel (ed.). Cultural Politics of Europe: European Capitals of Culture and European Union Since the 1980s. Routledge. pp. 127–140. ISBN 9780203081082.
