= Eddie Baxter =

American organist

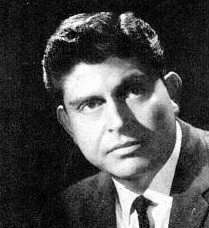
- Eddie Baxter, 1966

Background information
- Born: November 23, 1922; Colorado
- Died: August 21, 1998 (aged 75); Mission Viejo, California
- Genres: pop
- Occupation(s): organist, pianist
- Years active: 1930s – 1960s
- Labels: Dot; Imperial; Rendezvous

Eddie Baxter (November 23, 1922 – August 21, 1998) was an American organist who provided music for several TV programs and recorded several albums for various labels, most importantly for Dot.

Baxter was born in Colorado on November 23, 1922. By the age of ten he was playing piano for dancing classes. He moved to Los Angeles at age 13, and became a professional musician during his teenage years. He intended music as a hobby, enrolling in the pre-med program at UCLA. These plans were interrupted by World War II, which he spent in the Army Air Force. Following his discharge, he did not return to his studies but instead joined Glen Gray and the Casa Loma Orchestra. He then joined Frankie Masters where he added arranging duties to his pianist abilities. He began playing the organ, which diversified his career opportunities. He was the organist for The Continental and made an album with Renzo Cesana for Capitol Records. Through the early 1950s, he was the staff organist at NBC's KNBH which meant he played for award presentations, audience participation shows, game shows, variety shows, and even a space program. At night, Baxter played in nightclubs in both Los Angeles and Las Vegas. He became a spokesperson for Western Airlines and toured while promoting that air carrier. He then became Lowery Organ Company's resident artist, then subsequently was their representative in the Southern California territory. Later in life he resided in Sherman Oaks, California. Baxter died August 21, 1998, in Mission Viejo, California.

Baxter made a number of pipe-organ records. Some of his earlier efforts were not met with enthusiasm by the trade press, as Billboard called them "uninspiring" and gave them 2 stars. 1961 saw Baxter begin a series of LP records with Dot and these albums received much improved reviews from Billboard, which gave his albums 4 stars while noting he "played with feeling," maximizing focus on the melody while utilizing minimal production.

== Partial discography ==
- Speak Low (Rendezvous 1301) – 1957
- Temptation (Rendezvous 1302)
- This Love of Mine (Rendezvous 1303)
- Holiday for Pipes (Rendezvous 1305)
- Electronic Pipes (Rendezvous 1306)
- The Tasty Touch (Rendezvous 1303)
- Wedding Bells (Imperial 9111) – 1960
- Organ Festival (Dot 25277)
- Organ Songs We Love (Dot 25435) – 1962
- Great Organ Themes from Movies and TV (Dot 25436) – 1962
- The Fantastic Sounds of Eddie Baxter at the Lowery Organ (Dot 25551)
- More Fantastic Sounds! of Eddie Baxter (Dot 25607) – 1964
- Organ Blues 'N' Boogie (Hamilton 12136) – 1964
- Organ Sounds Indredible (Dot 25706) – 1966
- Organ Melodies of Love (Dot 25708) – 1966
- Super Organ (Concert E-130)
