= The Continental (Saturday Night Live) =

"Saturday Night Live" character created and portrayed by Christopher Walken

- Saturday Night Live character
- Walken as 'the Continental': Season 28, Episode 13
- First appearance: January 20, 1990
- Last appearance: February 22, 2003
- Portrayed by: Christopher Walken

In-universe information
- Gender: Male
- Nationality: Unspecified country from Continental Europe

"The Continental" is a recurring sketch on Saturday Night Live (SNL) featuring Christopher Walken. The first sketch aired on the eleventh episode of the fifteenth season, January 20, 1990.

== History ==
The sketch is a parody of Renzo Cesana, who starred in a 1952–1953 CBS series, The Continental. The series used a subjective camera, and Cesana spoke directly to women in the viewing audience. Cesana's show was subjected to many parodies, including Mad magazine's "The Countynental" (which was also the name used in a parody by Ernie Kovacs), Red Skelton's "The Transcontinental", and Floyd Vivino's "Ricardo Romantico."

The premise of the SNL sketch is that Walken is a "suave ladies' man" who in reality can't say or do anything to keep women from giving him the cold shoulder, typically due to a number of perverse actions that often border on sexual predation. For instance, he invites a woman to wash up in his bathroom. Once she is inside, it becomes obvious that the bathroom mirror is a two-way mirror when the Continental is seen lighting up a cigarette.

The Continental has both a periscope with which to "spy" on his upstairs neighbor and a collection of "erotic" Hummel figurines he acquired on eBay. These sketches are always shot from the woman's point of view, so we never see her face, just her gloved arms as she pushes him out of her way. Whenever he offers her a glass of champagne or, as he calls it, champagna [ʃɑmˈpɑnjʌ], she invariably ends up throwing it in his face. The character also has the catchphrase of "Wow! Wowie-wow-wow-wow!" which is usually said at some point when the woman has physically shown she has no interest in him, only for him to become even more aroused by her "tempestuousness".

In 2002, Walken was quoted as saying that he would like to do a Continental movie. "The problem with the Continental is that he never leaves his house. But it might be interesting to see the Continental go out and nothing works. He's a social catastrophe. I think that would be interesting."

== Phil Hartman ==
The voice-over at the beginning of the sketch is provided by Phil Hartman and has been used three times since his death in 1998.

== See also ==
- Recurring Saturday Night Live characters and sketches
