= Hyatt Regency Casablanca =

Hotel in Casablanca, Morocco

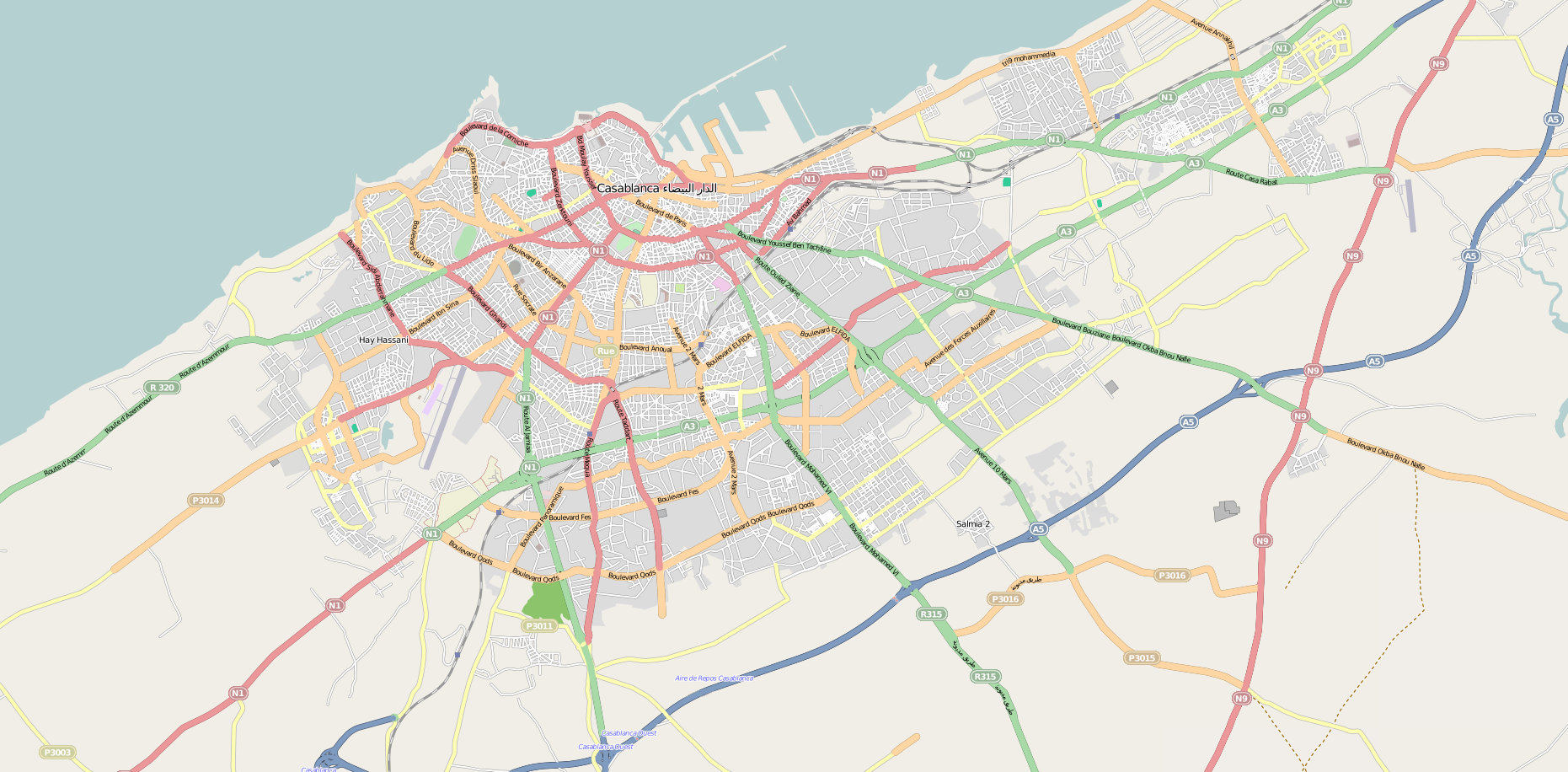
- Location within Greater Casablanca

General information
- Location: Place des Nations Unies, Casablanca
- Coordinates: 33°35′45″N 7°37′10″W
- Management: Hyatt Hotels Corporation

Other information
- Number of rooms: 255

The Hyatt Regency Casablanca is a luxury hotel in the Old Medina of Casablanca, Morocco, located just to the west of Sheraton Casablanca Hotel & Towers.

The hotel opened in 1973 as the Hotel Casablanca and joined Hyatt in the 1980s. It has 255 rooms, including 223 deluxe king and twin rooms, 11 junior suites, 19 executive suites and 3 royal suites, and 8 conference rooms accommodating from 20 to 400 people. Its restaurants, such as Cafe M, Dar Beida, Bissat and the outdoor Les Bougainvillées cater in Moroccan, fusion or Parisian cuisine. Dar Beida is a traditional Moroccan restaurant resembling an Arab tent and Bissat is located under a Moorish dome.

The King Rooms cover 31 square metres with a Simmons Beautyrest luxe king bed with plush duvet, marble bath and other luxury furnishings. The hotel also has an outdoor pool, a sauna, gym, two squash courts, a volleyball court, a basketball court and a hammam.

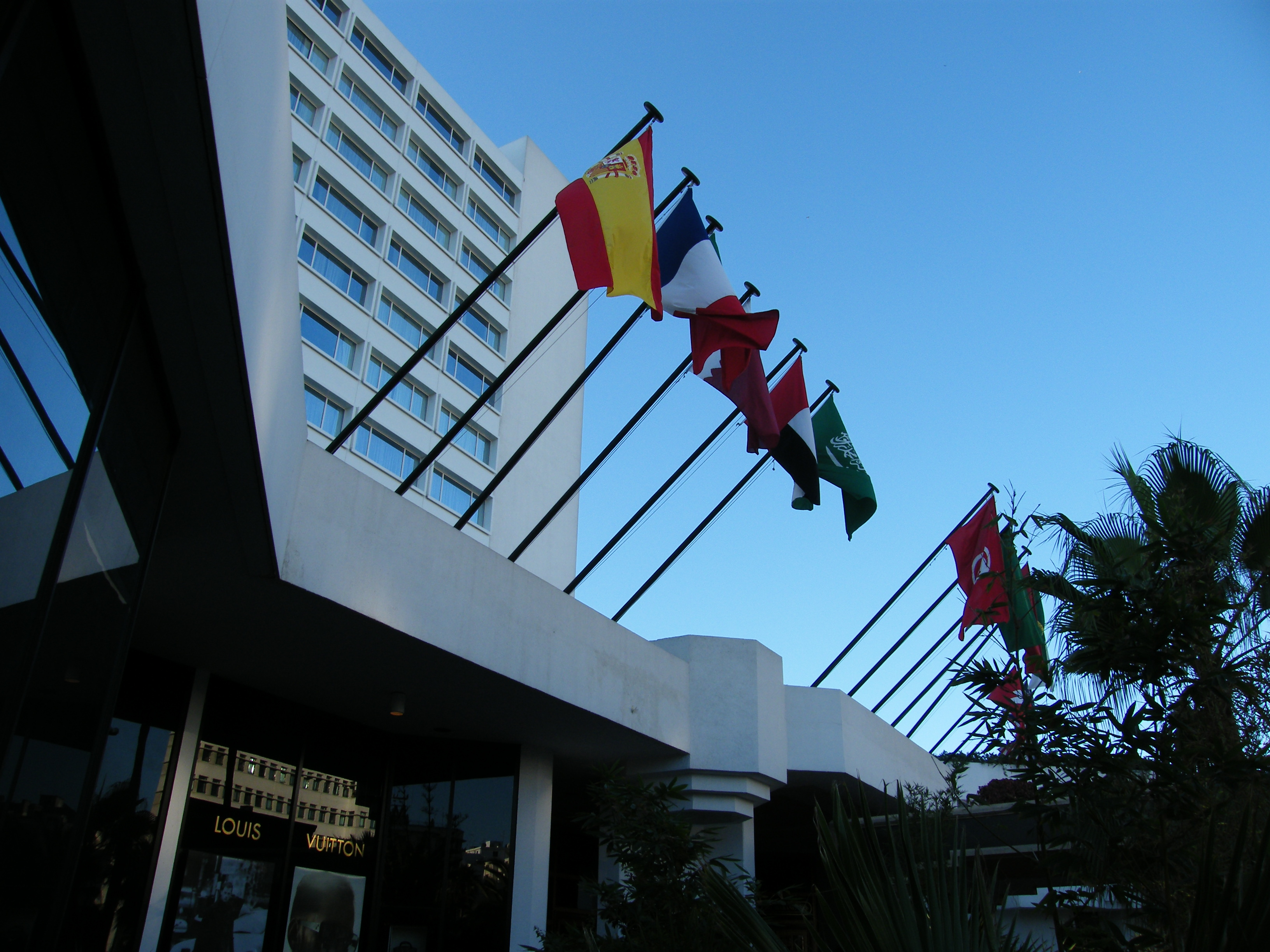

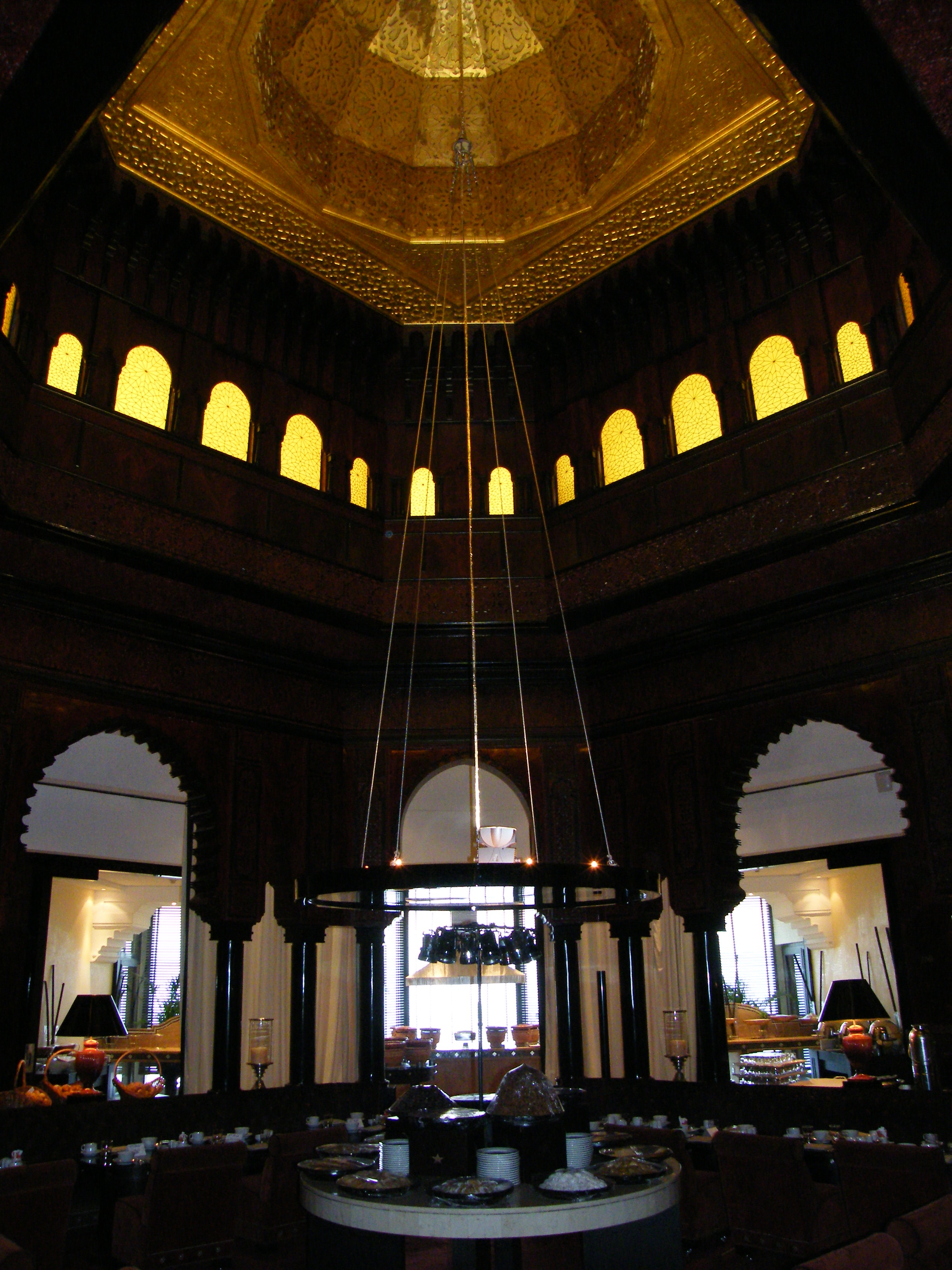

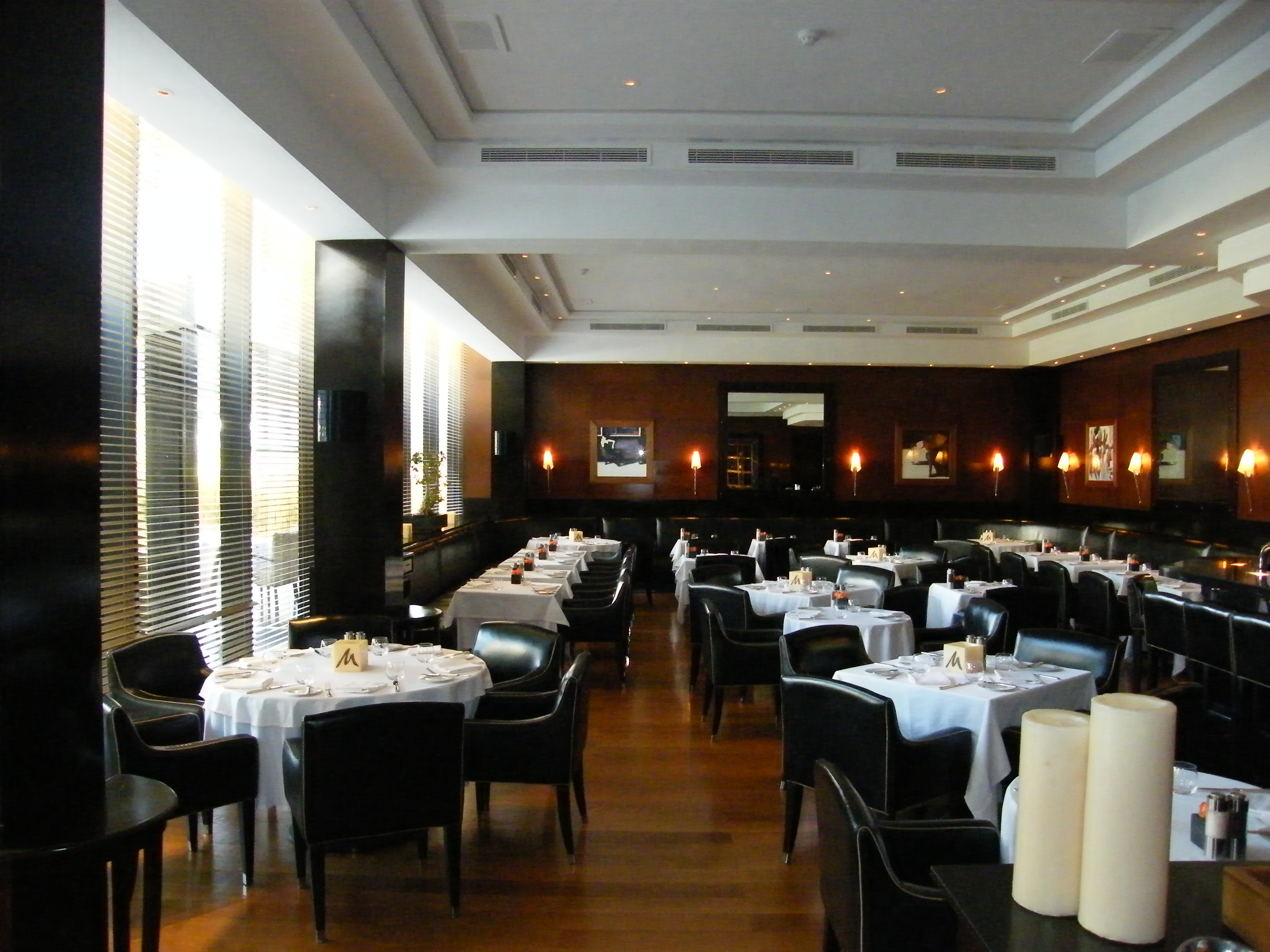

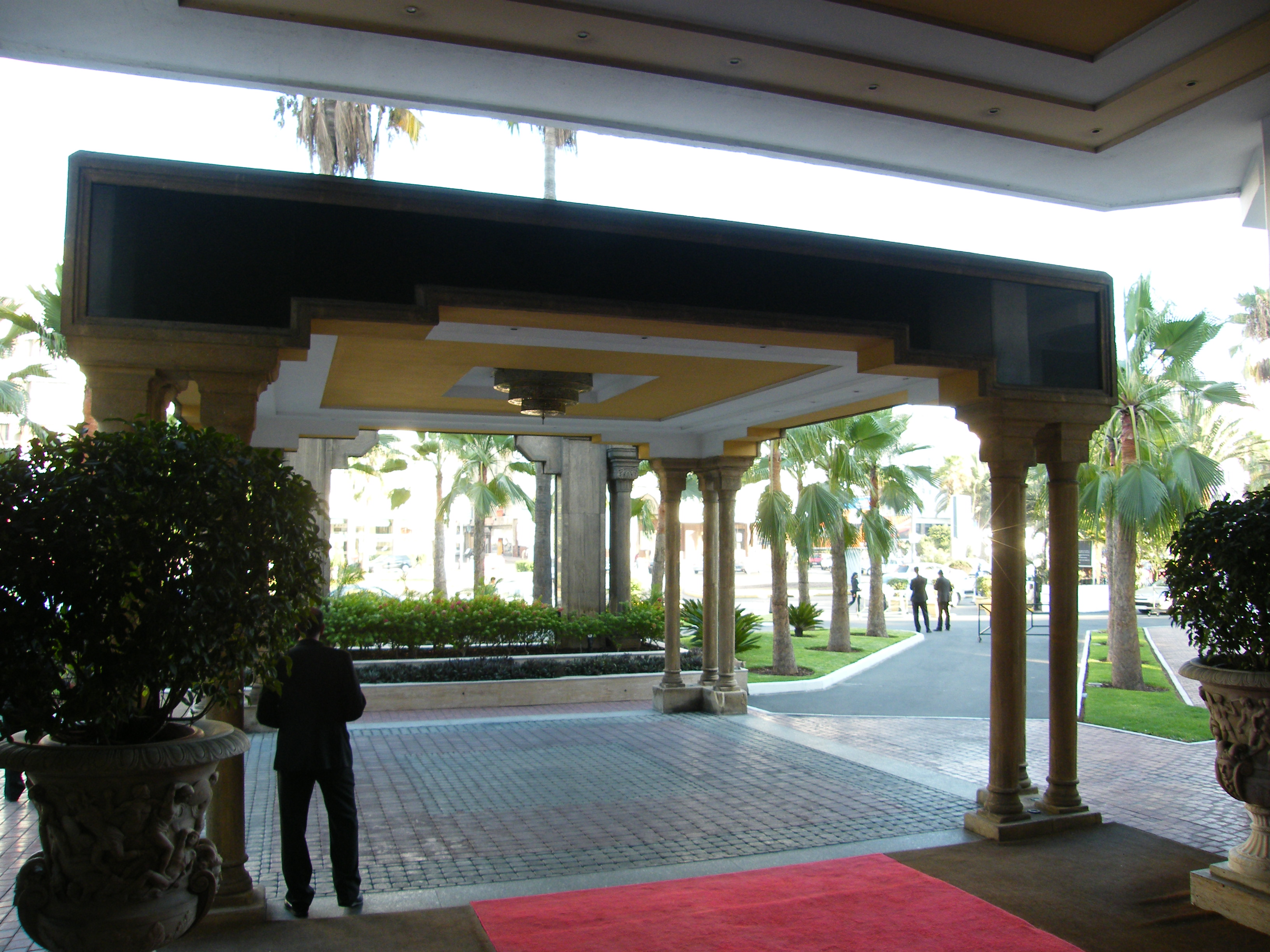
