= Kuhn & Komor =

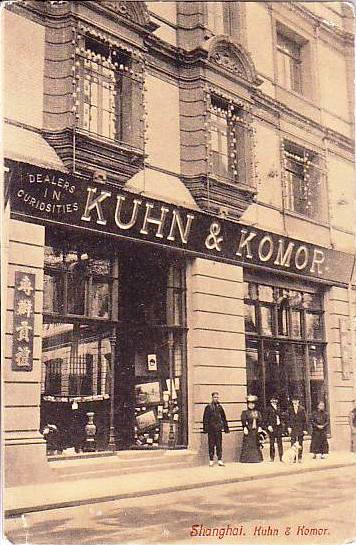
- Kuhn & Komor shop at the Shanghai Palace Hotel
- Industry: Jewelry and retail
- Founded: 1869; 157 years ago in Yokohama, Japan
- Founder: Moritz Montague Kuhn
- Headquarters: Shanghai, China
- Products: Sterling silver, china, crystal, stationery, and personal accessories

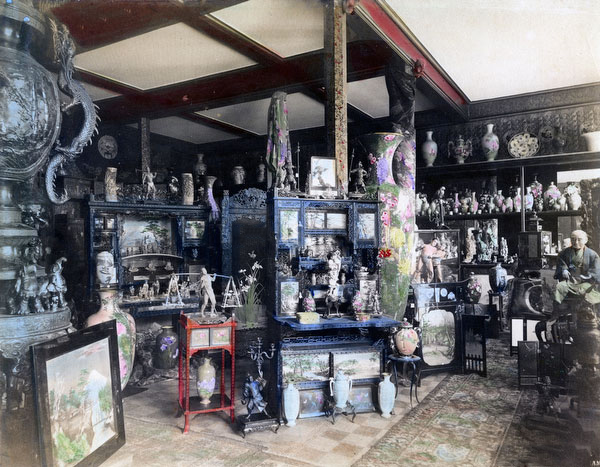
Interior of the shop in Yokohama

Kuhn & Komor (康茂洋行), also known colloquially as K&K, was a Hungarian multinational luxury jeweler and specialty retailer headquartered in Shanghai, China. K&K produced jewelry, sterling silver, china, crystal, stationery, and personal accessories. K&K was renowned in East Asia for its luxury goods, also being called the "Asprey of Asia."

== History ==
The Komor family was Jewish and originally came from Budapest, Hungary.

Moritz Montague Kuhn (d. 1901) founded Kuhn & Co in Yokohama in 1869, a shop filled with Curios, curiosities from the Far East (or souvenir shop). Siegfried Komor (1863-1935), the nephew of Kuhn, came to Japan in 1887 to work for his uncle, followed by the son of Kuhn, Arthur, who arrived in Japan in 1890. In 1894, Siegfried Komor and Arthur Kuhn founded Kuhn & Komor in Yokohama.

The company opened a shop in the Shanghai Palace Hotel in Shanghai. They later opened a shop on No. 37 Water Street (水町通り) in Yokohama. The company existed until 1913 when Siegfried Komor retired to Budapest and renamed Komor and Komor and continued until 1936 and failed to survive under Siegfried’s sons control with the outbreak of World War II brought it to an end.

Items by Kuhn & Komor receive high prices on auctions.
