= Peace Hotel =

Hotel in Shanghai, China

Fairmont Peace Hotel 上海和平饭店
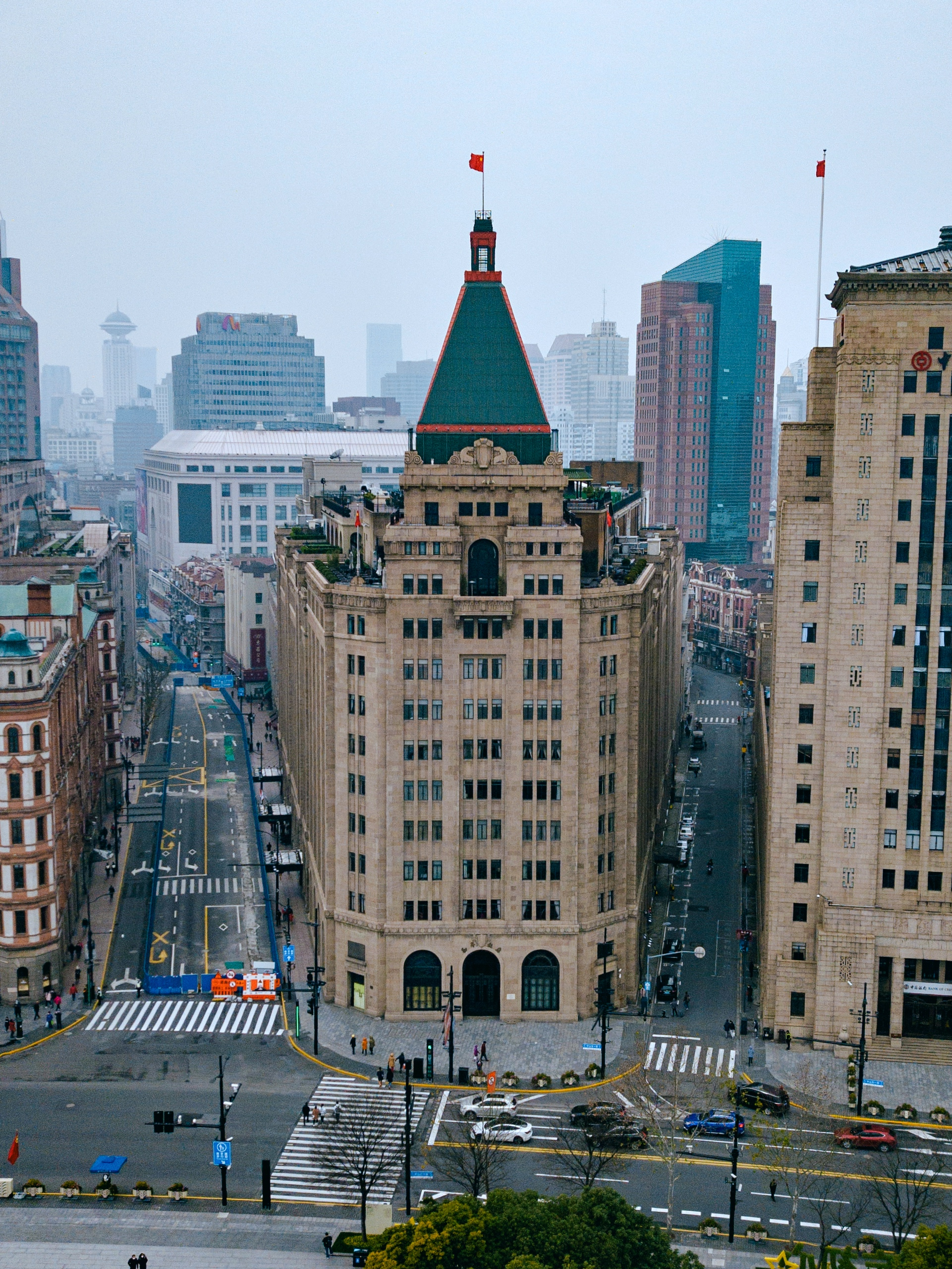
- Front view of The Fairmont Peace Hotel
- Interactive map of the Fairmont Peace Hotel 上海和平饭店 area

General information
- Architectural style: Art deco
- Location: 20 East Nanjing Road, Shanghai
- Coordinates: 31°14′27.9″N 121°29′04.5″E
- Opened: 1929
- Owner: Jinjiang International
- Operator: Fairmont Hotels and Resorts (North Building), The Swatch Group (South Building)

Technical details
- Floor count: 13

Other information
- Number of rooms: 270
- Number of suites: 39
- Number of restaurants: 6

Website
- www.fairmont.com/peace-hotel-shanghai/

Peace Hotel
- Simplified Chinese: 上海和平饭店
- Traditional Chinese: 上海和平飯店
Transcriptions
Standard Mandarin
- Hanyu Pinyin: Shànghǎi Hépíng Fàndiàn

The Peace Hotel (Chinese: 和平饭店; pinyin: Hépíng Fàndiàn; Shanghainese: Wubin Vaedi) is a hotel on The Bund in Shanghai, China, known as the Fairmont Peace Hotel run by Fairmont Hotels and Resorts of Canada. The hotel has two different buildings. The north building, completed in 1929 as Sassoon House, originally housed the Cathay Hotel. Across Nanjing Road, the south building was built as the Palace Hotel in 1908, and is today a residence and studio for artists, known as The Swatch Art Peace Hotel.

== North Building ==
The larger North Building was originally called Sassoon House. It was built by Sir Victor Sassoon, of the Sassoon family, which built a Shanghai business and real estate empire in the early 20th century. He was a British Sephardic Jew of Iraqi origin, educated at Harrow School and Cambridge University. His family owned the trading company "E.D. Sassoon & Co.", which managed extensive business interests throughout Asia.

Sassoon House was the first high-rise building built by Victor Sassoon, and one of the first tall buildings in the Far East, rising to 77m top the top of the tower, fifty feet taller than the next tallest building on the Bund. Sassoon bought a full city block on a prominent spot on the Bund, with long frontages on both sides. It was designed by architects Palmer and Turner, with a reinforced concrete structure. Construction began in 1926, and was completed in 1929.

The Cathay Hotel incorporated a high standard of luxury and modern amenities such as indoor plumbing, which made it a more esteemed establishment than other nearby hotels such as the Kadoorie family owned Majestic and Astor House Hotels. The Cathay featured a floor of rooms referred to as the "national suites," with each room decorated in a different foreign style. According to author Jonathan Kaufman, the Japan Suite featured tatami mats, Indian rugs and cushions were found in the India Suite, and Chinese furniture and ceramics in the China Suite.

The building occupies 4,617 square meters (49,697 square feet), and offers 36,317 square meters (390,913 square feet) of floor space. The building is ten stories in height, and the tenth floor is a penthouse, where Victor Sassoon once lived. The North Building is 77 meters (253 feet) high to the roofline, and 83 meters (272 feet) to the spire.

The builders followed a consistent art deco scheme, from exterior design to interior decor. Most of the building features granite facing, while the ninth floor and the roof are surfaced with terracotta. The eastern facade (facing the Huangpu River and the Bund) features a pyramidal roof with steep sides, and a height of about 10 meters (33 feet). The pyramid is faced with copper, which has corroded to light green.

Banks and shops leased the ground floor space until 1949. This space became the Shanghai branch of Citibank in 2002. The fourth through ninth floors once housed the Cathay Hotel.

After the Communist takeover in 1949, some of the offices were used by the Municipal Finance Committee. In 1952, the building was taken over by the Municipal Government. In 1956, it once again became a hotel under the name "Peace Hotel". During the Cultural Revolution, the hotel was used by the Gang of Four, most famously by Zhang Chunqiao as he headed the Shanghai Commune from headquarters in the Peace Hotel.

Its Old Jazz Band was recently the basis for a movie, "As Time Goes By" a film by Uli Gaulke. Its roof terrace restaurant overlooks the district of Pudong across the Huangpu. This hotel was also used as an inspiration for Vicki Baum's 1937 novel "Shanghai '37", also known as "Hotel Shanghai" and "Nanjing Road".

In 2007, the hotel closed for a three-year renovation of both the exterior and interior, including the guest rooms, the lobby, and the dining and entertainment venues. The North Building reopened in 2010, as the Fairmont Peace Hotel Shanghai. The hotel now offers 270 guestrooms and 39 suites, including Victor's Café, named for Sir Victor Sassoon. The eighth floor hosts the Peace Hall, plus several meeting rooms, and an outdoor terrace.

A low-rise extension has been added to the rear of the hotel, housing guestrooms, a swimming pool, and spa.

In May 2025, Jinjiang International, the hotel's owner and Accor, parent company of Fairmont, the hotel's manager, announced the Peace Hotel would undergo extensive renovations, during which it will remain open. At the conclusion of renovations, in 2027, the hotel will be moved to Accor's Raffles Hotels & Resorts luxury division and will be renamed Raffles Peace Hotel Shanghai.

== South Building ==
Separated from the North Building by Nanjing Road, the hotel business that occupies the South Building dates back to the 1850s, when it was known as the Central Hotel. In 1903, the hotel was renamed the Palace Hotel. The building that stands today was completed in 1908, and offered two elevators, the first building in Shanghai to do so. It was also once home to a Kuhn & Komor shop.

The hotel occupies 2,125 square metres (22,870 sq ft), with a floor space of 11,607 square metres (124,940 sq ft). It has a brick veneer, with its six stories reaching 30 metres (98 ft) in height. The exterior is in a Renaissance style. The hotel has eighteen artist residences and seven guest rooms.

In 1911, after the success of the Xinhai Revolution, Sun Yat-sen stayed at the hotel and advocated commitment to the revolutionary cause. During World War II, the building was occupied by the Japanese army; it was purchased postwar by a Chinese company, continuing operations until 1952, when it was confiscated and used by the Municipal Construction Department. In 1965 it resumed operations as a hotel, as a wing of the Peace Hotel.

Similar to its counterpart to the north, the South Building was renovated in preparation for the 2010 World Expo. It emerged as The Swatch Art Peace Hotel. It hosts artists from around the world who live and work for a limited time in apartments/workshops. The heritage facade and public rooms of the building have been restored.

== Gallery ==
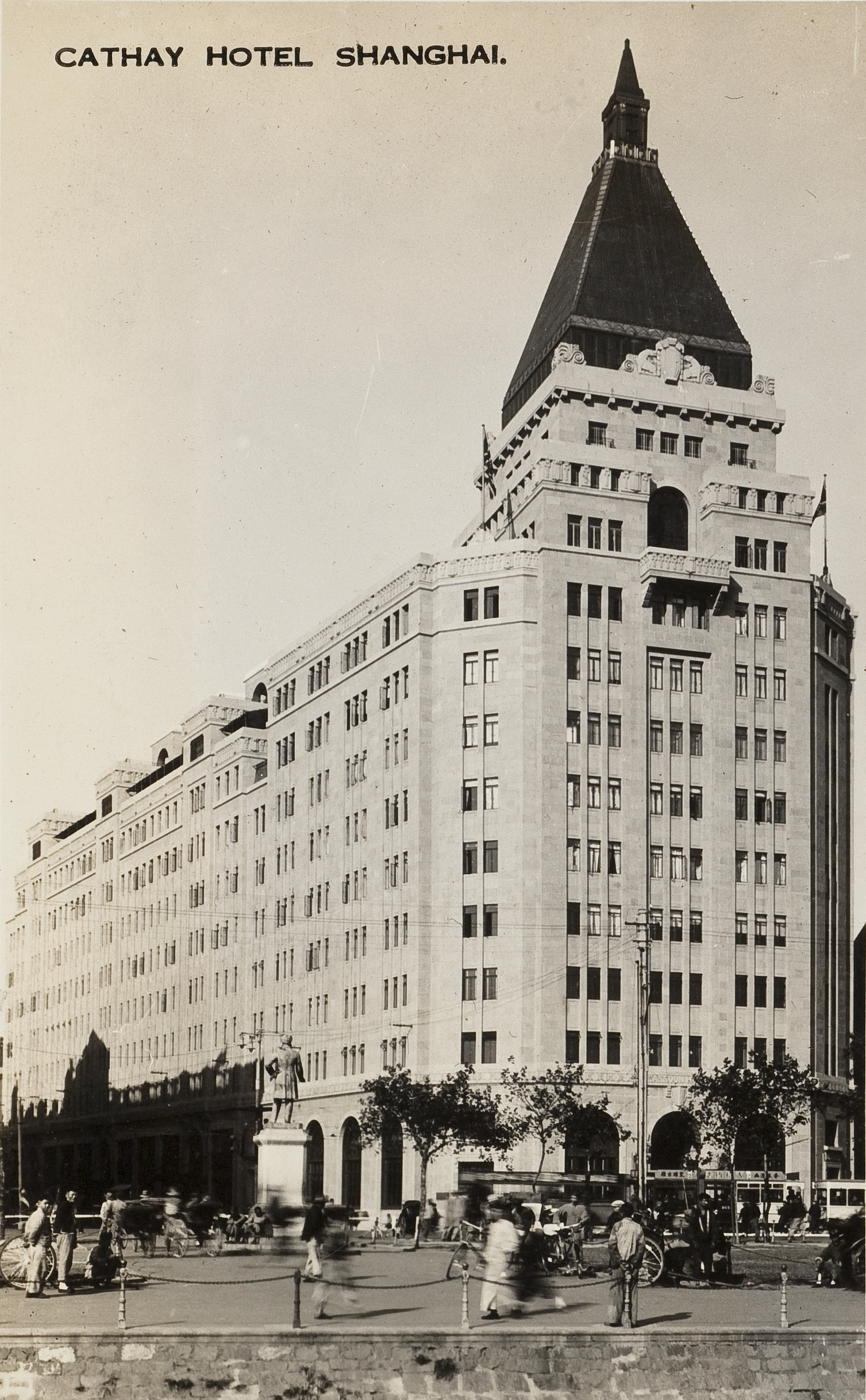
Cathay Hotel, 1933

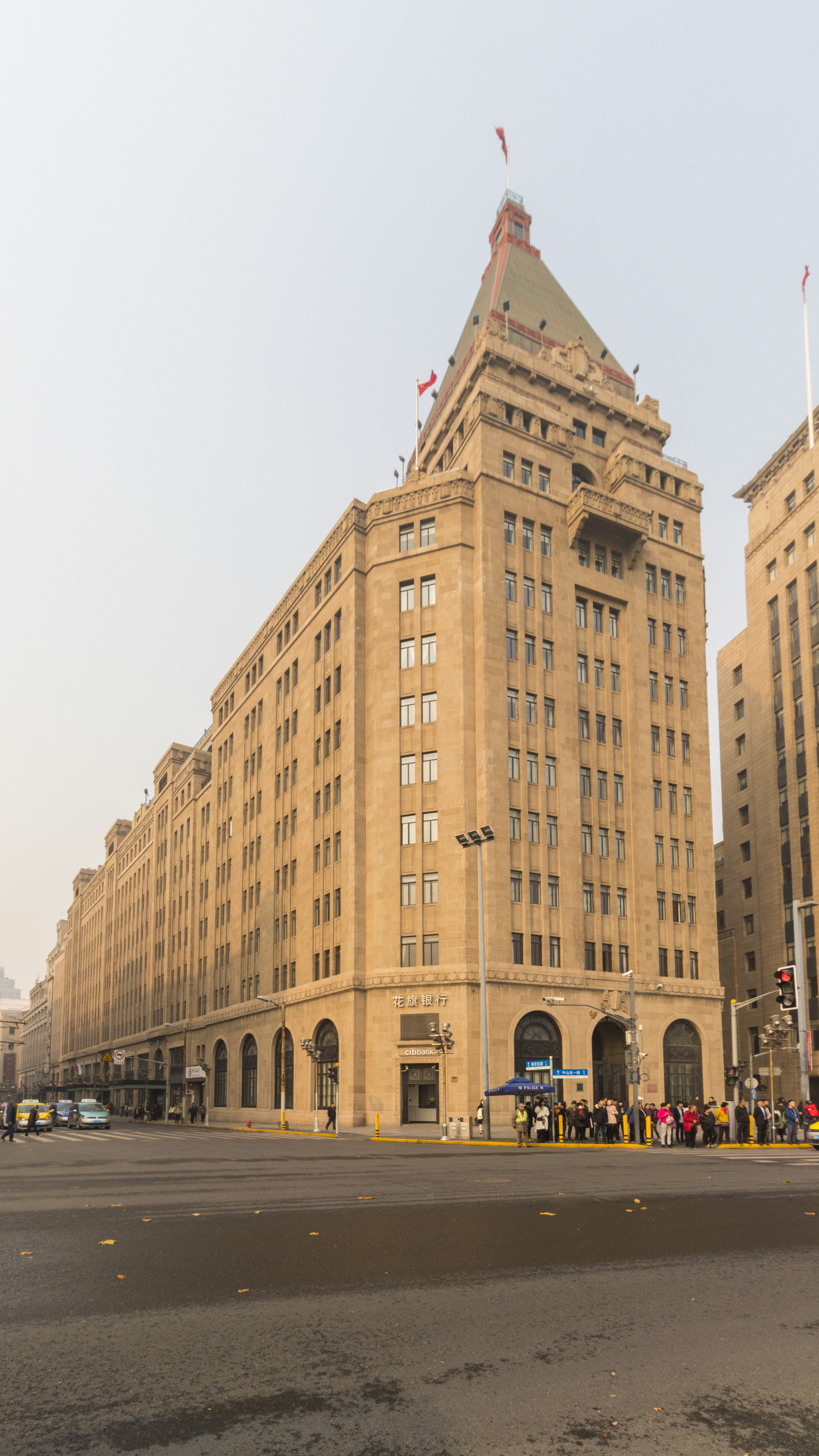
Peace Hotel, 2017

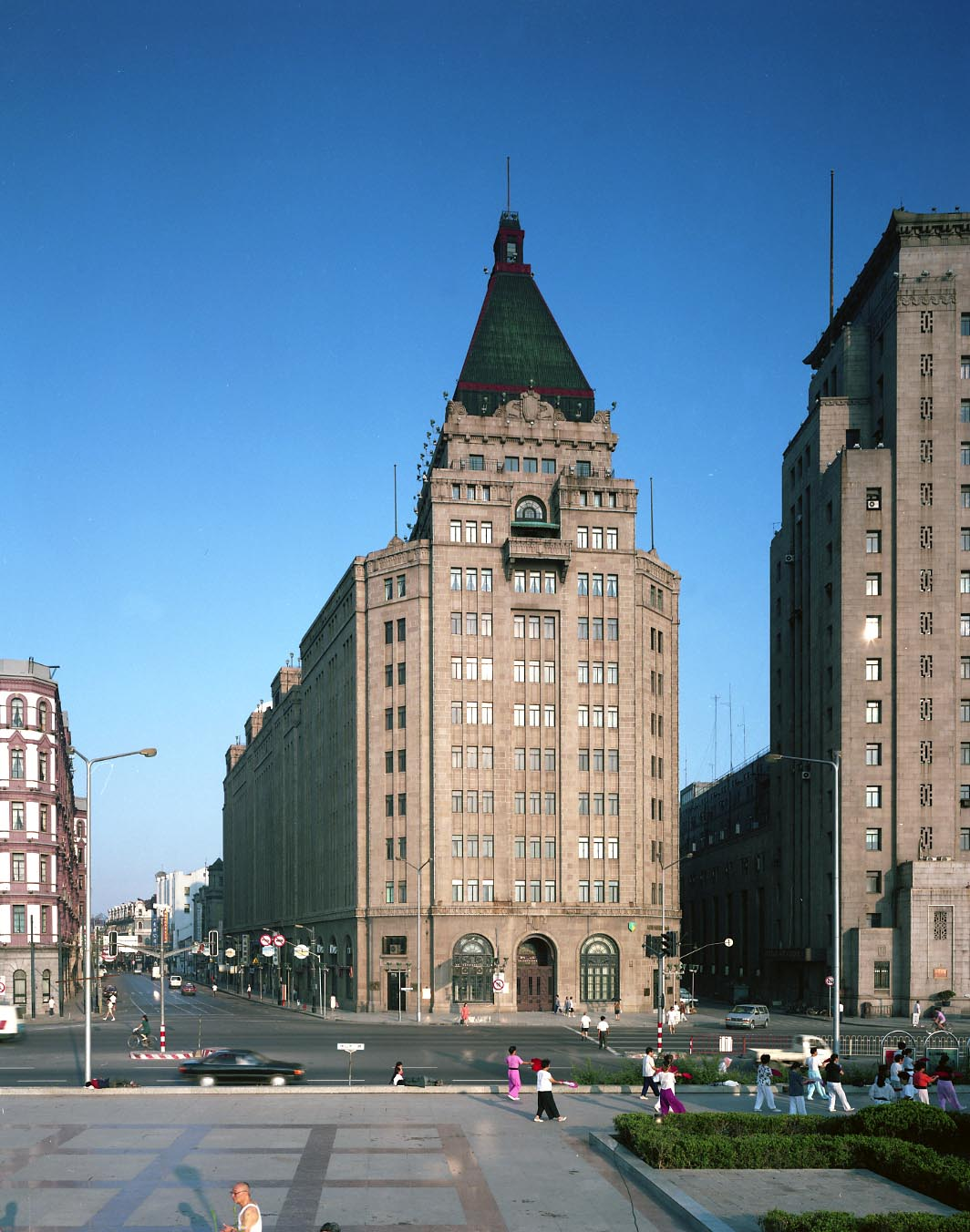
Peace Hotel, 1994

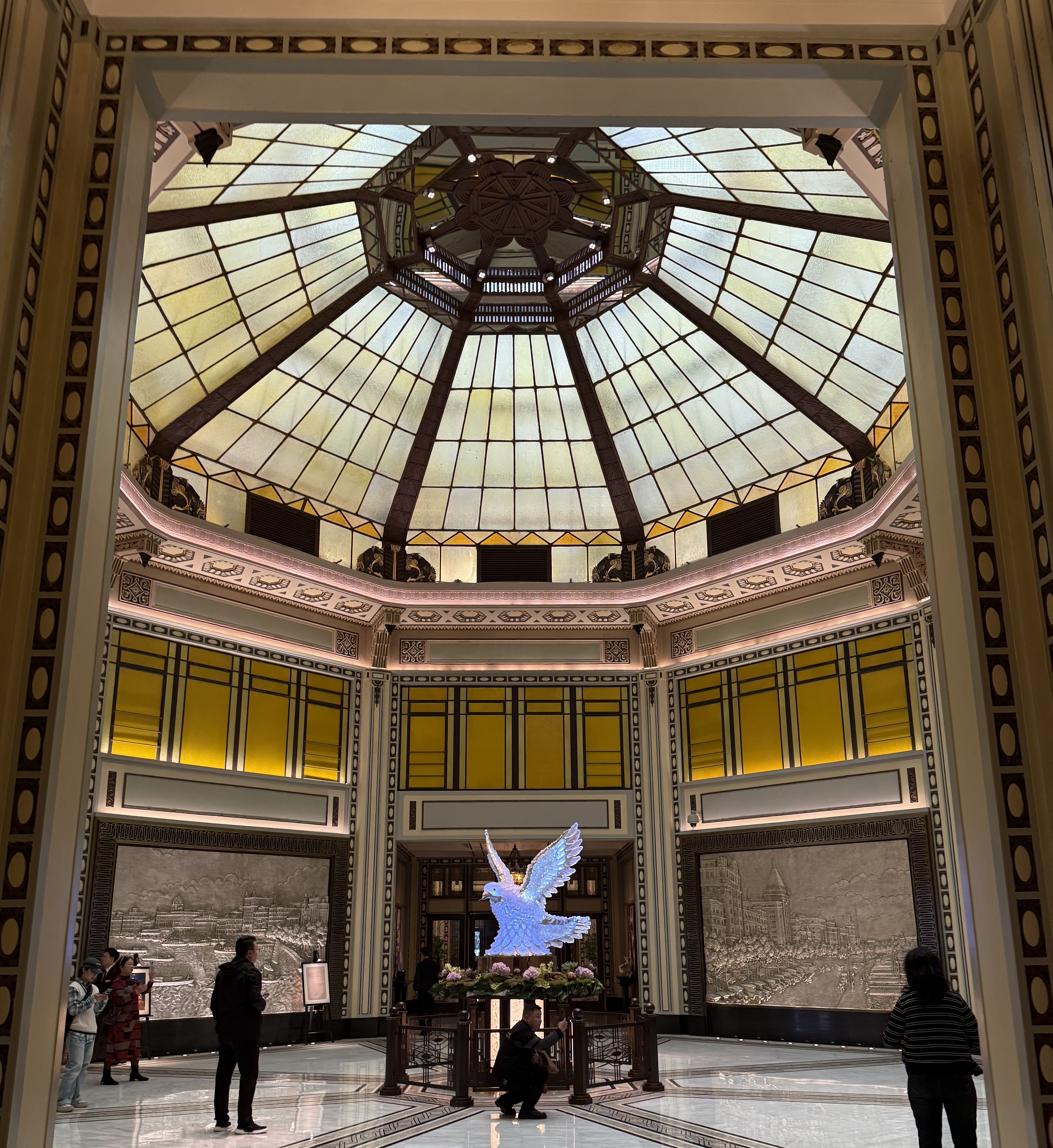
Peace Hotel rotunda, as renovated in 2010

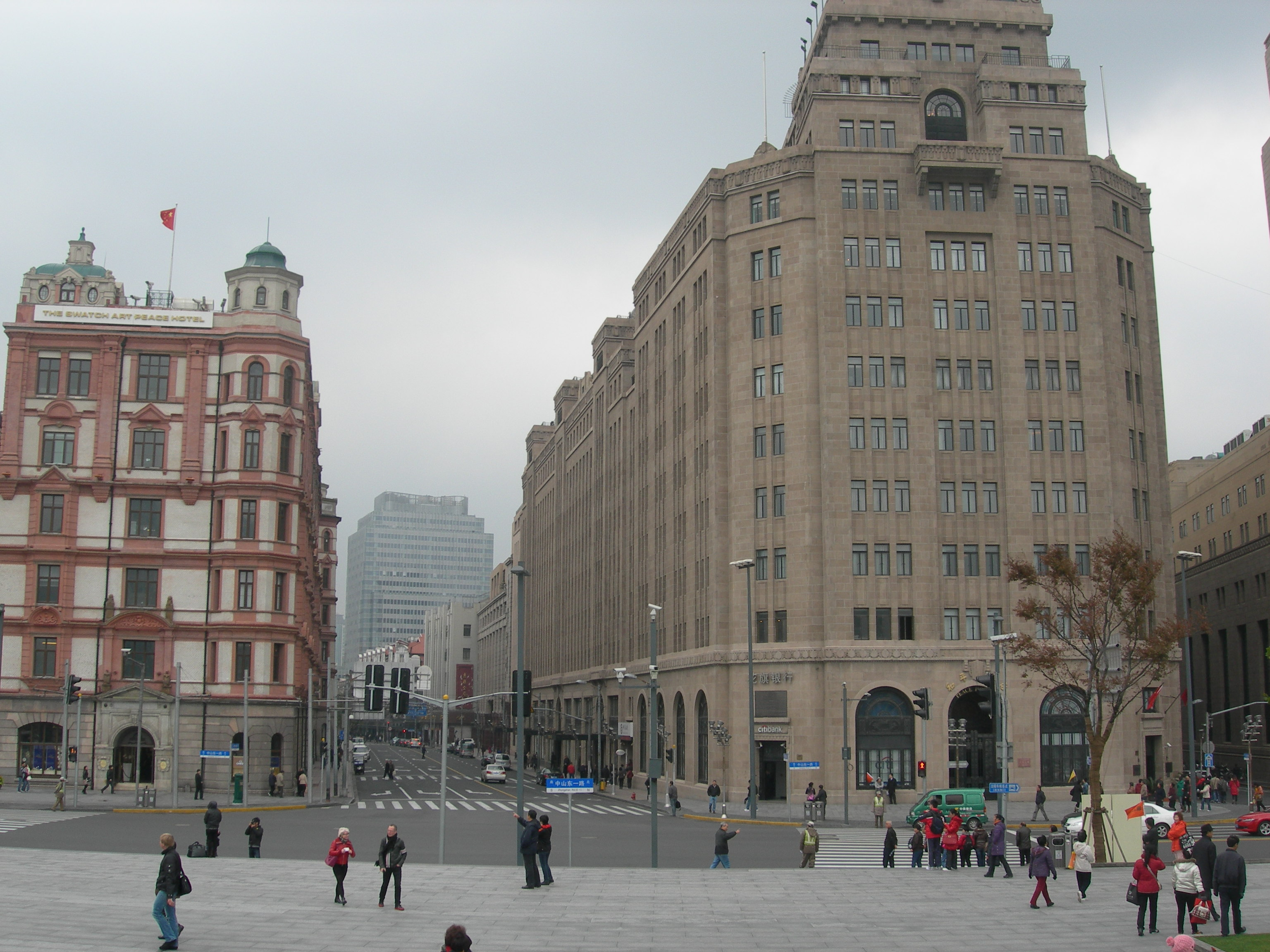
Palace Hotel on left, Peace Hotel on the right, 2010

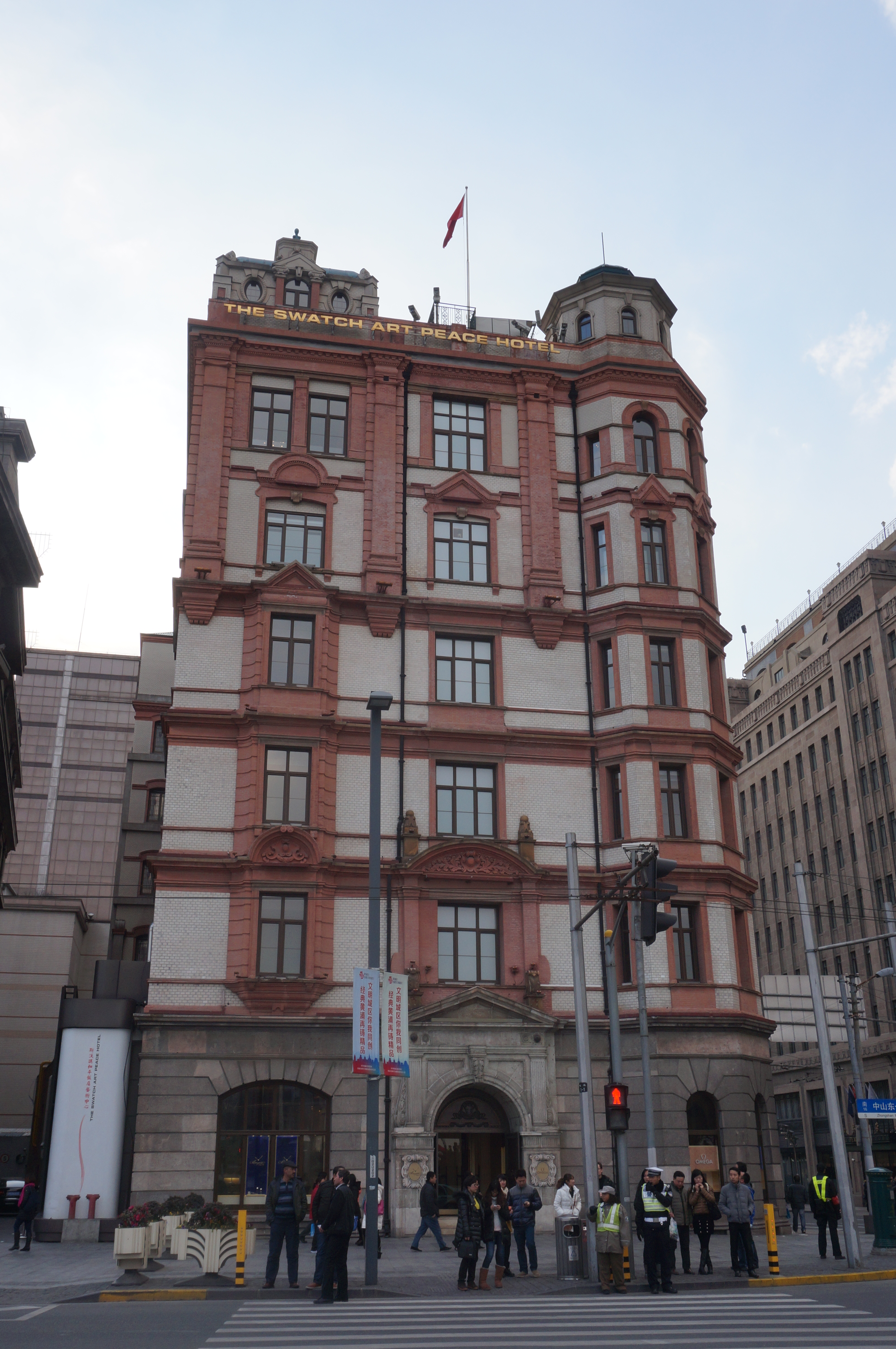
South Building (Palace Hotel), 2014

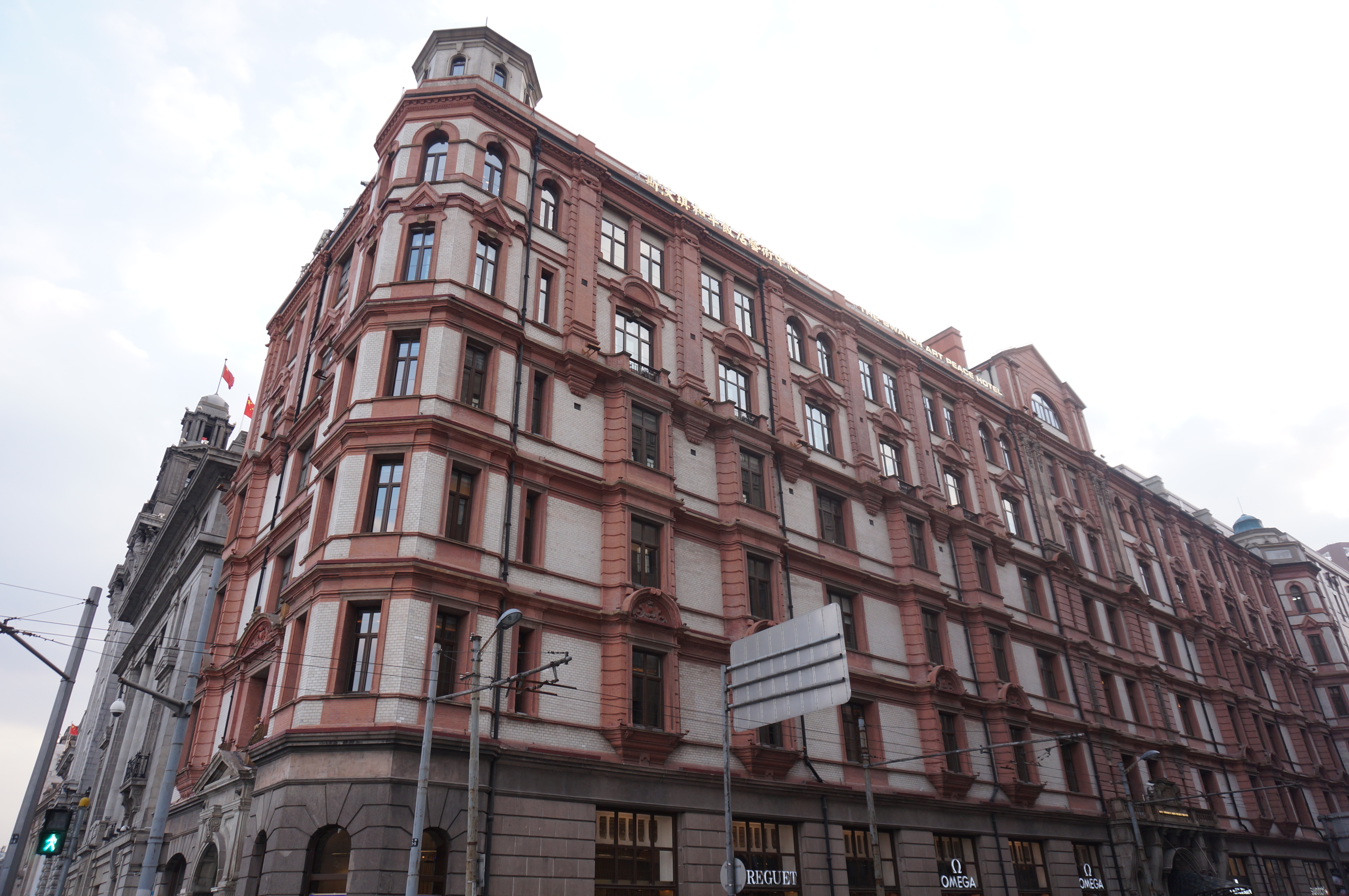
South Building (Palace Hotel), 2014

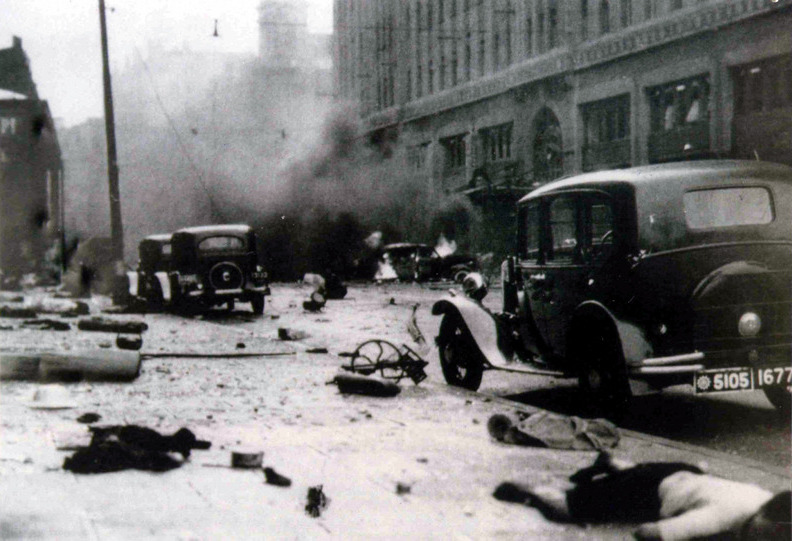
Bombing in Nanjing Road between the Palace and Cathay Hotels, August 14, 1937

== See also ==
- Private Lives, a play by Noël Coward written in the Cathay Hotel

Preceded by ?	Tallest Building in Shanghai; 1929 – 1934	Succeeded by Park Hotel
