= Continental Hotels =

Romanian hotel chain

- Type: Privately held company
- Industry: Hospitality
- Founded: April 1991
- Headquarters: Bucharest, Romania
- Number of locations: 12
- Services: Hotels
- Number of employees: 600+
- Website: continentalhotels.ro

Continental Hotels is the first Romanian hotel chain, founded in 1991. From the beginning, the target markets were both business and tourism. The company’s development subsequently aimed at covering the luxury, business and economy segment, by providing accommodation from 2 to 5 stars.

== Properties ==
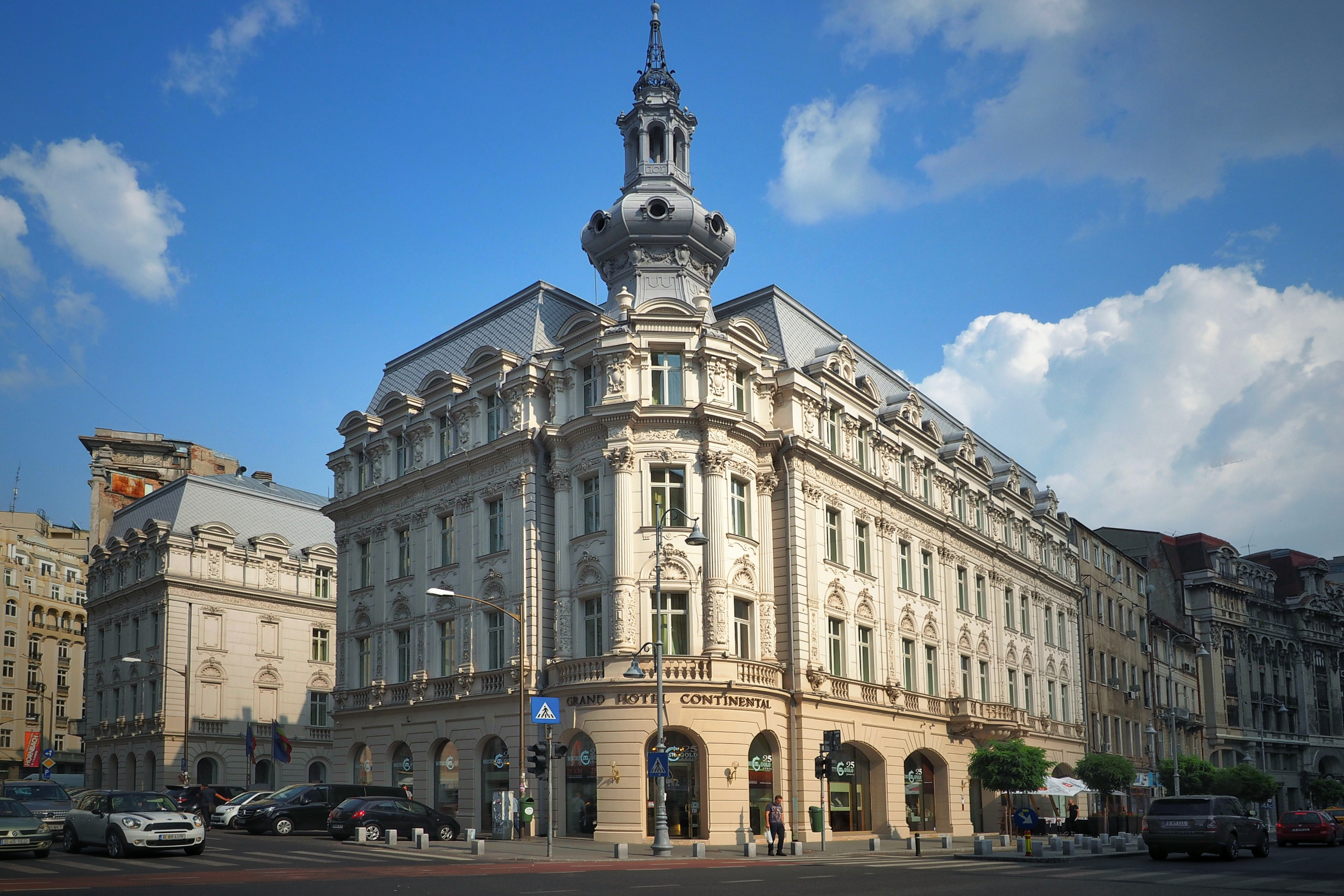
Grand Hotel Continental in Bucharest

As of 2024, the chain includes 12 two-, three-, four- and five-, star hotels and owns properties in major cities in Romania:

- Grand Hotel Continental - Bucharest
- Continental Forum - Bucharest, Arad, Constanta, Oradea, Sibiu & Targu Mures
- Continental - Drobeta Turnu Severin
- MyContinental - Bucharest, Sibiu & Suceava
- Hello Hotels - Bucharest
