= The Continental (1952 TV series) =

American TV series (1952–1953)

- Starring: Renzo Cesana
- Country of origin: United States
- Original language: English

Original release
- Network: CBS
- Release: January 22 – April 17, 1952
- Network: ABC
- Release: October 1952 – January 6, 1953

The Continental is an American television series that aired on CBS from January 22, 1952, through April 17, 1952, and on ABC from October 1952 through January 6, 1953. It starred Renzo Cesana in the title role.

== Synopsis ==
The CBS series used a subjective camera, as Cesana spoke directly to women in the viewing audience in a suave manner, with each episode a different romantic rendezvous, accompanied by lounge music played by Eddie Baxter on an electronic organ. Occasionally, Cesana would recite the lyrics to a song.

The ABC version had The Continental interacting with couples who were on their first dates.

In an era when advertisers and advertising agencies played major roles in program creation and sponsorship, the show began as a syndicated 15-minute radio show created, written and produced by agency owner Cesana on Los Angeles station KHJ in February 1951. It directly followed The Lonesome Gal, a nationally syndicated radio show in which host Jean King played records and spoke in a soothing monologue to male listeners. The Continental failed to attract an audience and was soon cancelled. Cesana convinced television station KNBH to air a video version, which went on the air twice weekly beginning in June 1951. The show was picked up briefly by the CBS network, where it debuted on January 22, 1952, and ended on April 17, 1952.

Cesana was back as the Continental on New York radio station WMGM in 1953. A package of 13 new quarter-hour television episodes of The Continental was syndicated in 1954.

== Production ==
The CBS version was shown on Tuesdays and Thursdays at 11:15 p.m., Eastern Time. The ABC version was on Tuesdays and Fridays from 11 to 11:15 p.m. E.T.

== Pop culture references ==
Despite the fact that the show was short-lived, The Continental has been satirized and referenced in the years following its cancellation:

- Issue #14 of Mad featured a parody, "The Countynental", by Harvey Kurtzman and Jack Davis.
- The 1954 Pepé Le Pew cartoon "The Cat's Bah" begins similarly to The Continental format, with a female interviewer who is not shown but whose presence is implied.
- Comedian Red Skelton performed a parody titled "The Transcontinental"
- Comedian Jerry Lewis mocked The Continental while also doing an impersonation of Marlon Brando on The Colgate Comedy Hour.
- The 1956 Popeye cartoon "Parlez Vous Woo" has Bluto pretending to be "The International", the suave television personality whom Olive Oyl prefers to stay home to watch rather than go out on a date with Popeye.
- The best-known reference is the recurring Saturday Night Live satire with actor/frequent host Christopher Walken as the title character in The Continental, a sketch series remarkably similar to the Mad version.
- Yahoo! Sports soccer blog Dirty Tackle has a recurring series in which Bulgarian player Dimitar Berbatov is... The Continental.
- The opening of the Season 8 episode "Mr Monk and the Critic" of Monk appears to pay homage to this format.
- On the comedy/variety program The Uncle Floyd Show, host Floyd Vivino frequently performed a parody skit as "Ricardo Romantico".
- Talia Shire lights up a cigarette along with an episode of "The Continental" in the film Old Boyfriends.

== Recordings ==
Cesana obtained a recording contract with Capitol Records during the run of The Continental, although he confessed to Time magazine, "I'm the only Italian living who can't sing." Recordings by Renzo Cesana, in which he recites song lyrics to musical accompaniment, appear as unnamed tracks at the end of several CDs in the Capitol Records Ultra-Lounge series, always unmentioned in the liner notes. Among them are "Violets for Your Furs" and "Walk the Lonesome Night."
