= Piața Mare =

City square in Sibiu, Romania

Coordinates: 45.7966°N 24.1517°E

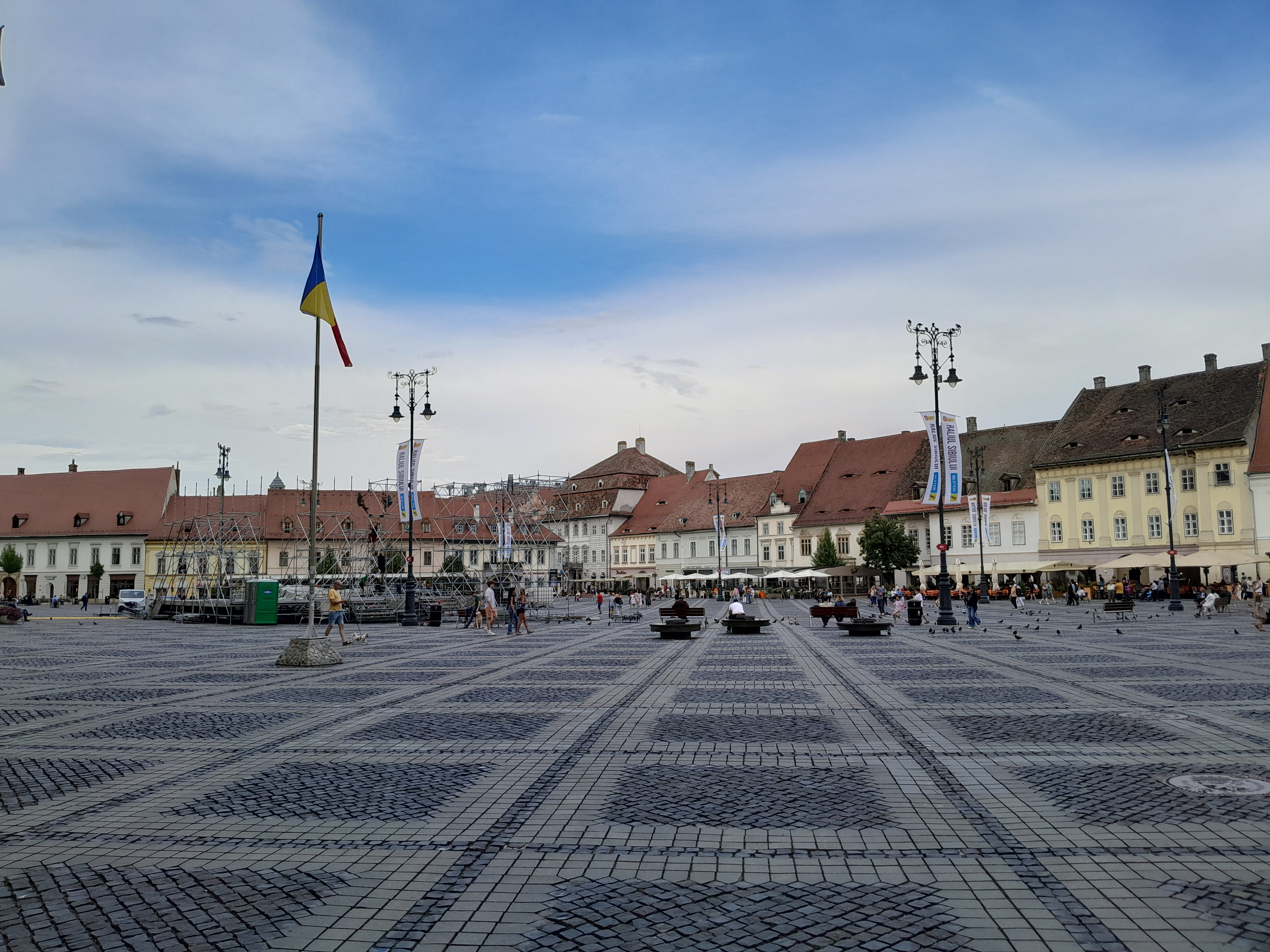
Piața Mare

Piața Mare (literally "Grand Square" in Romanian) is the central city square in Sibiu, Romania.

It has existed since 1366. In 2005 it was completely renovated.

== Buildings around the square ==
- Jesuit Church
- Brukenthal National Museum
- Council Tower of Sibiu
- Blue House, Sibiu
- Haller house
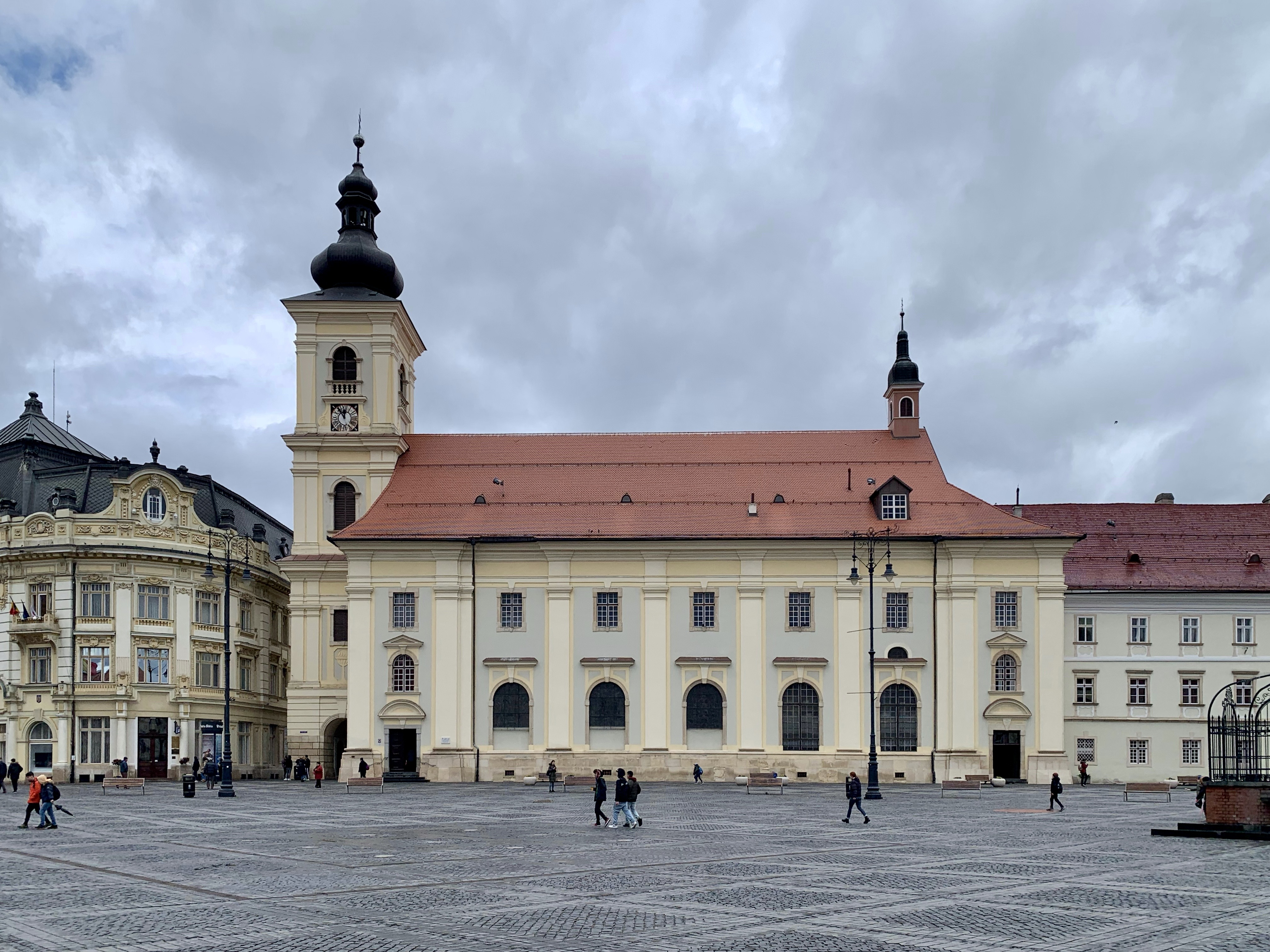
Jesuit Church

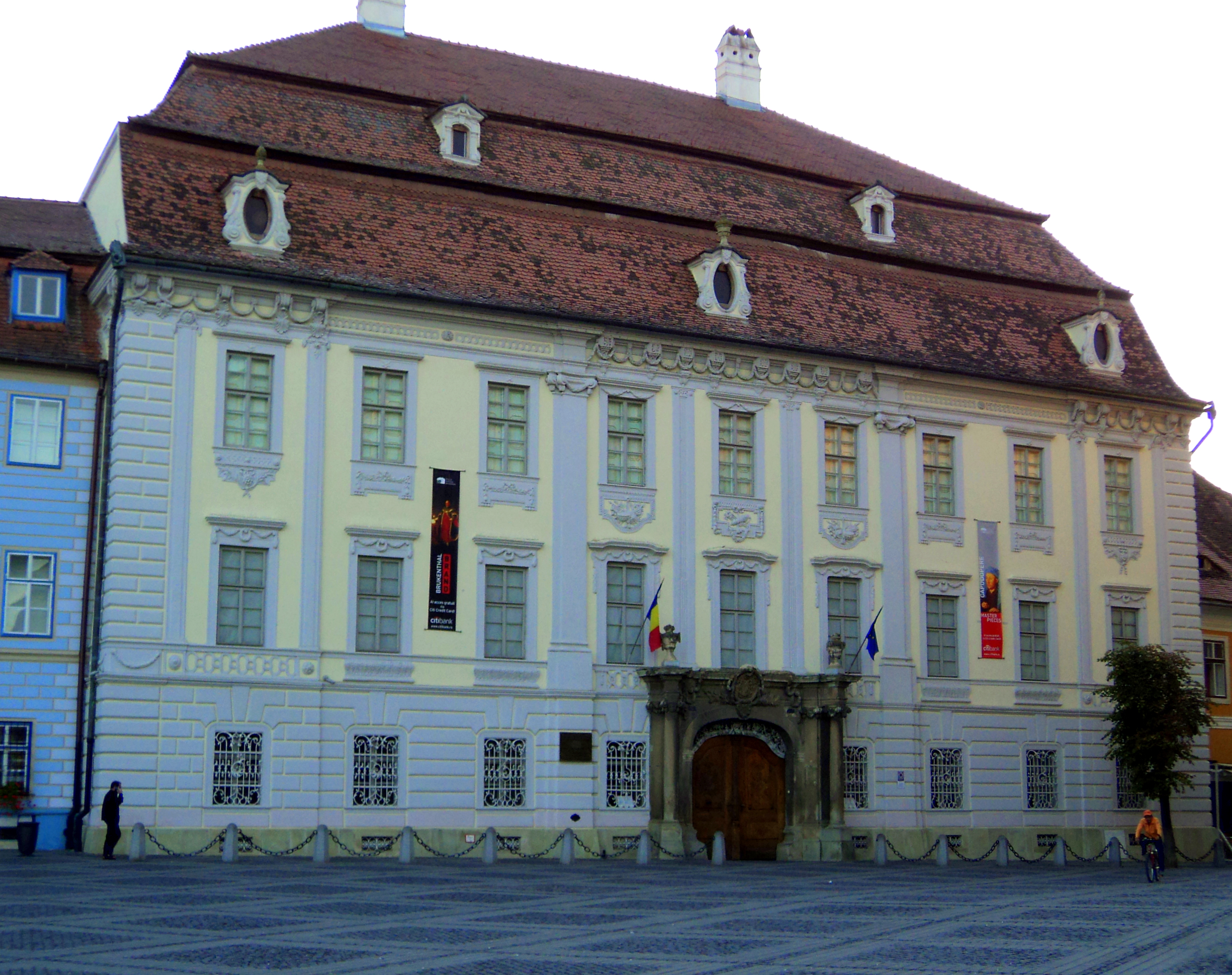
Brukenthal National Museum

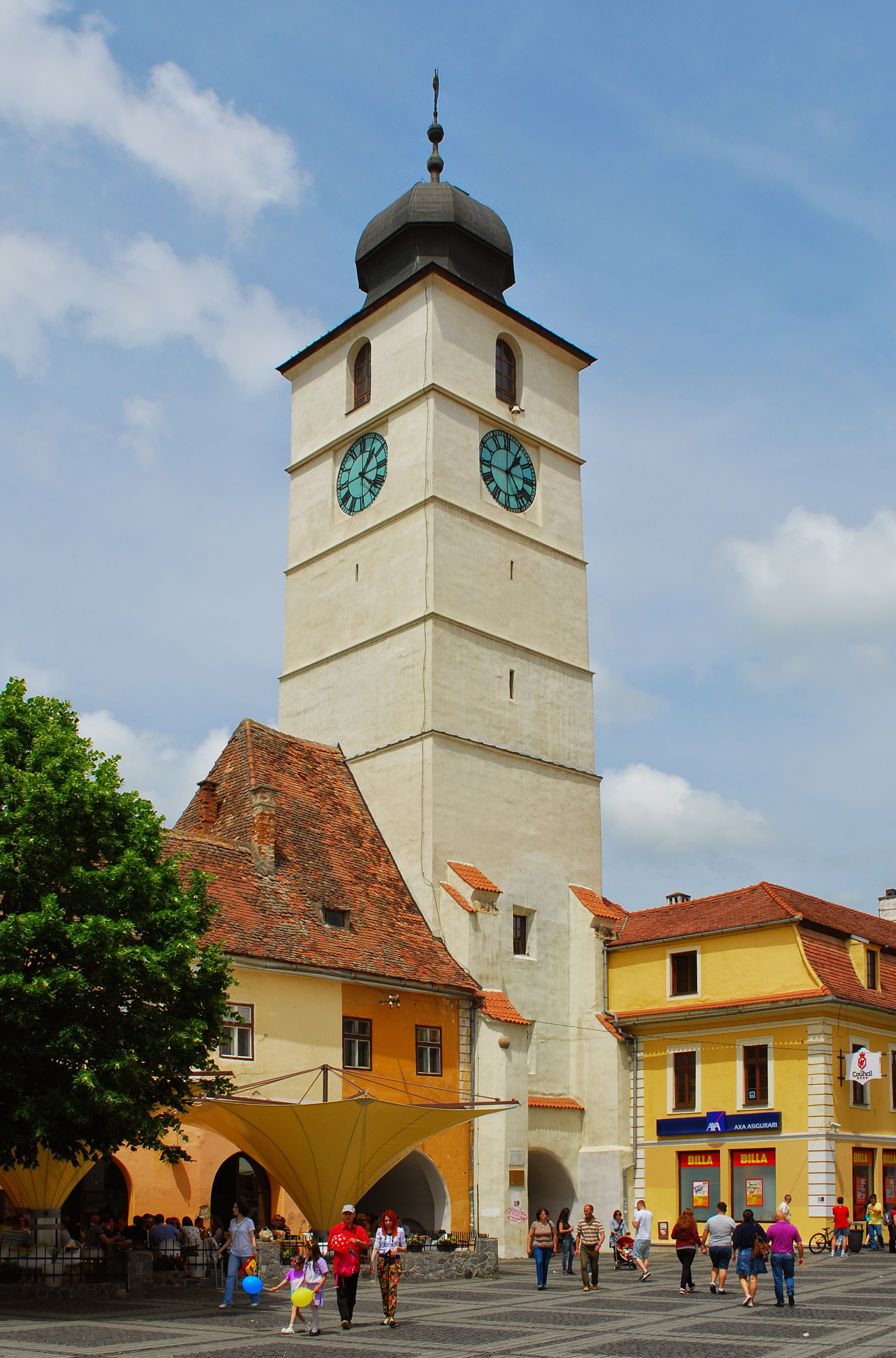
Council Tower of Sibiu

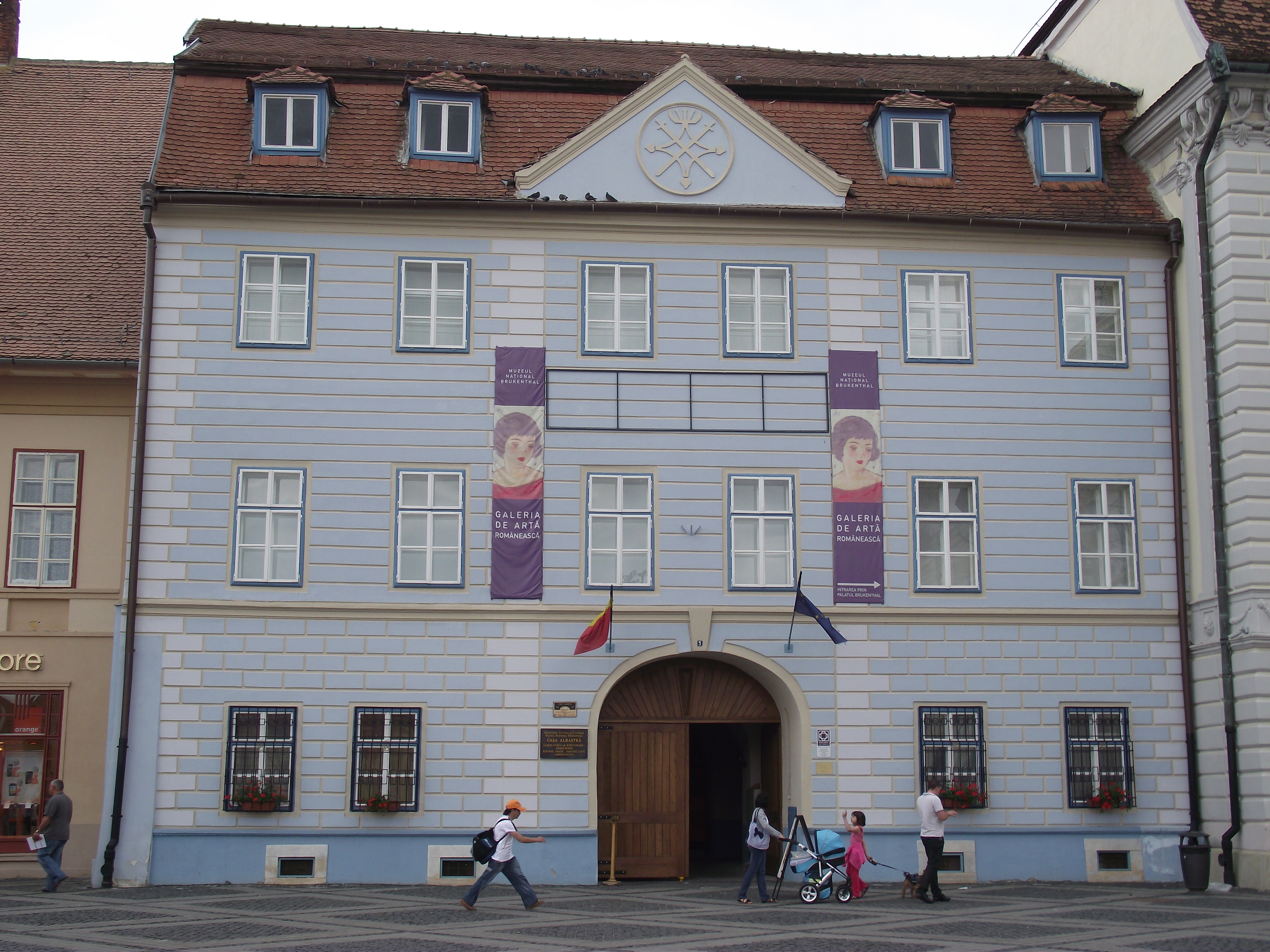
Blue House
