= Renaissance Kuala Lumpur Hotel =

Hotel in Kuala Lumpur, Malaysia

Coordinates: 3.1575°N 101.7053°E

Renaissance Kuala Lumpur Hotel & Convention Centre
- Interactive map of the Renaissance Kuala Lumpur Hotel & Convention Centre area

General information
- Location: Corner of Jalan Sultan Ismail and Jalan Ampang Kuala Lumpur, 50450 Malaysia
- Year built: 1996
- Opening: 20 October 2023
- Operator: Marriott International

Other information
- Number of rooms: 406
- Number of restaurants: 2
- Number of bars: 1
- Facilities: Club Lounge, Swimming Pool, Fitness Centre, Kids Club, Playground
- Parking: Available

Website
- Renaissance Kuala Lumpur Hotel

== History ==
The Renaissance Kuala Lumpur Hotel & Convention Centre opened in 1996 as part of Marriott International's Renaissance Hotels brand. It consisted of two towers with guest rooms, the East Wing and the West Wing. They were connected by a podium structure, containing the lobby, restaurants, meeting facilities, and a pool deck on the roof. An underground tributary of the Gombak river runs under the East Wing. The Renaissance Kuala Lumpur Hotel also houses the Mandara Spa.

In 2020, the hotel temporarily closed for an extensive renovation and repositioning. The East Wing was later rebranded as Four Points by Sheraton Kuala Lumpur, City Centre, while the West Wing continues under the Renaissance brand.

== Renovation and Dual-Brand Relaunch (2023) ==
In October 2023, the Renaissance Kuala Lumpur Hotel reopened after a major renovation that introduced redesigned rooms, updated public areas, and new family-oriented facilities.

The property became part of Malaysia's first dual-branded complex under Marriott International, sharing its address with the Four Points by Sheraton Kuala Lumpur, City Centre. The two hotels share facilities in the podium building.

== Facilities ==
Following the refurbishment, the hotel features 406 rooms and suites, two dining outlets, and a bar.

Leisure facilities include an outdoor pool with water slides, an indoor Kids Club, a fitness centre, and a large play area for children.

The convention centre offers a dedicated entrance and lobby, 52,000 sq ft of event space, including a 1,800-seat ballroom and 25 meeting rooms.

== See also ==
- Marriott International
