= Tanjung Sanctuary =

Tanjung Sanctuary Langkawi is a resort located in Langkawi, Kedah, Malaysia. The resort is located at Pantain Kok, which is on the west coast of Langkawi, and it covers 62-acre (0.25 km^{2}) of forest next to a large sandy beach, five private coves, fresh water streams and rocks.
