= Lilongwe Hotel =

Coordinates: 3°57′58″S 33°46′35″E

Lilongwe Hotel is a hotel located on the main city road in Area 3, Capital Hill, Bwaila West in Lilongwe, Malawi.

It is located near Lilongwe International Airport. The hotel has 90 rooms with bathrooms and radio, telephone, fax and satellite television facilities. The Cocktail Bar and Malingunde Bar are located in the hotel and the features live music seven days a week. International cuisine is served at the hotels' Malingunde Restaurant.The hotel is set in extensive gardens.
