= Datai Langkawi =

Resort in Malaysia

The Datai Langkawi
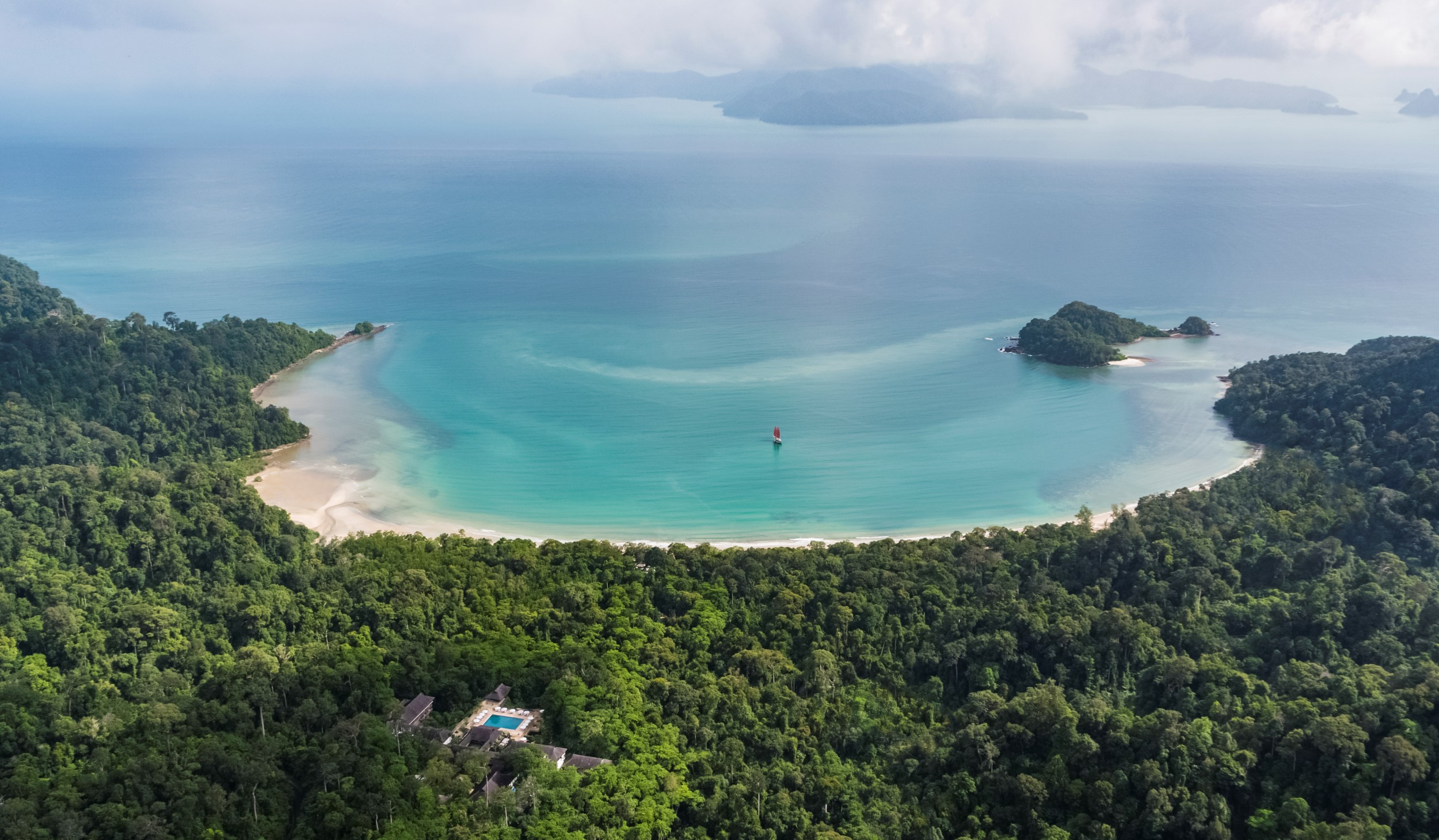
- The Datai Langkawi Aerial view

General information
- Address: Jalan Teluk Datai, 07000 Langkawi, Kedah, Malaysia
- Town or city: Langkawi
- Country: Malaysia
- Coordinates: 6°25′21.1″N 99°40′13.5″E
- Opened: October 1993
- Renovated: Sep 2017 until Sep 2018

Design and construction
- Architect(s): Kerry Hill and Didier Lefort

Other information
- Number of rooms: 121 (54 Rooms, 12 Suites, 55 Villas)
- Number of restaurants: 5
- Facilities: Spa, Nature Centre, Lab, Permaculture Garden, Watersports Pavilion, Holistic Pavilion, Health Club, Atelier, Boutique, Golf Course, Tennis Courts

Website
- https://www.thedatai.com/

The Datai Langkawi is a resort in Langkawi, Kedah, Malaysia. The resort overlooks the Datai Bay on one side and a rain forest on the other. The Datai Langkawi opened in October 1993.

== Management ==
When it opened, The Datai Langkawi was managed by General Hotel Management (GHM), a hotel management company based in Singapore. This resort was the first project of GHM which subsequently came under the management of Destination Resorts & Hotels Sdn. Bhd on 28 July 2011. The Datai Langkawi is currently managed by Datai Hotels and Resorts Sdn Bhd, a company incorporated to manage and operate hospitality properties in Malaysia and beyond.

== Refurbishment ==
The Datai Langkawi temporarily closed its doors on 4 September 2017 to embark on an extensive US$60 million renovation project. The Datai Langkawi appointed Didier Lefort to lead this project, the designer who worked with Kerry Hill on the original construction of the property. In September 2018, The Datai Langkawi was reopened initially with a soft launch period.
