= Hotel Continental (Tangier) =

Historic hotel in Tangier, Morocco

Coordinates: 35°47′15″N 5°48′34″W

- فندق كونتيننتال
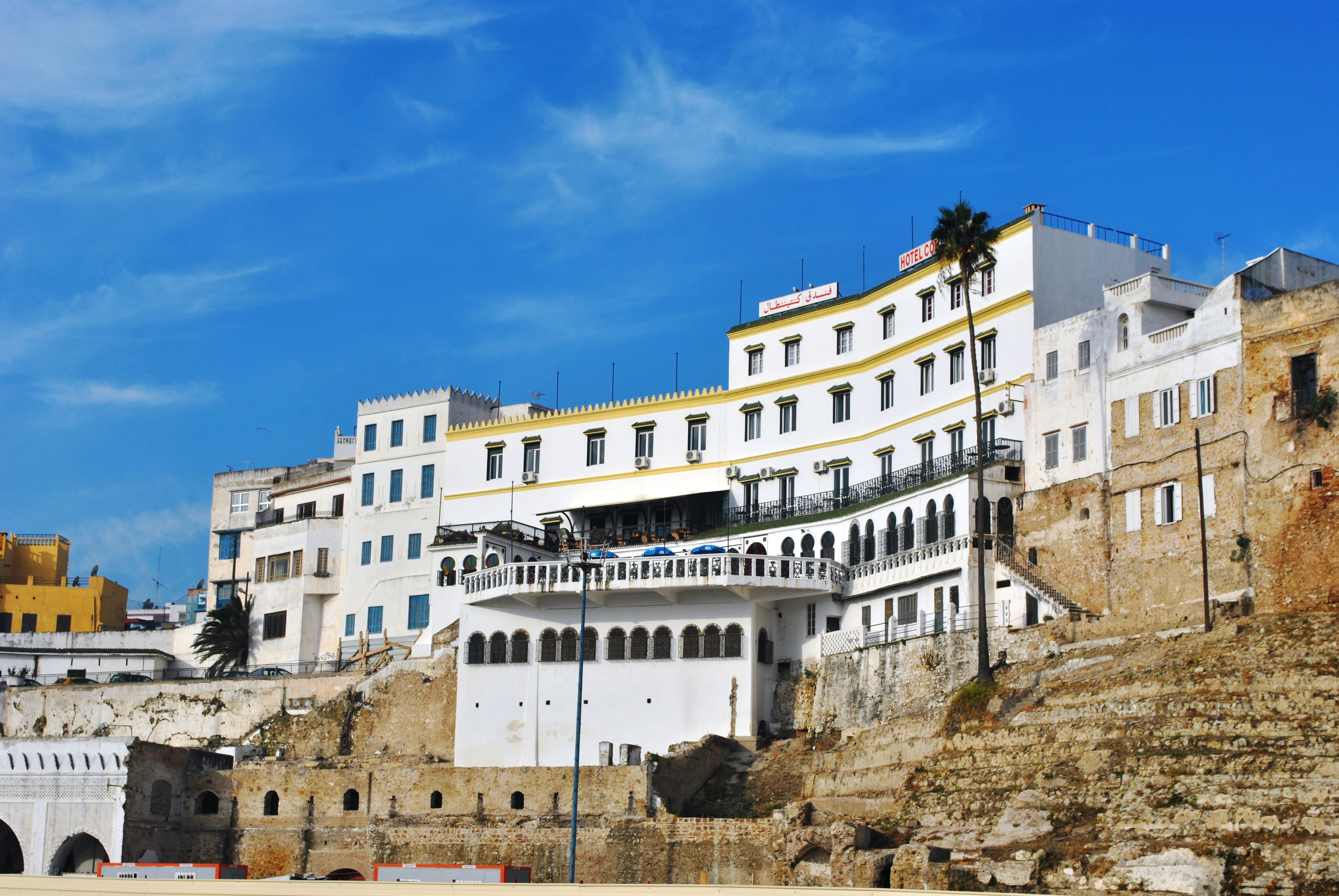

General information
- Type: Hotel
- Location: 36 Rue Dar Baroud, Tanger 90000, Morocco, Tangier, Morocco
- Opened: 1870

Other information
- Number of rooms: 56

Website
- https://hcontinental-tanger.com/

The Hotel Continental, built in 1870, is one of the oldest hotels in Tangier, Morocco. It was founded by the Ben Dahans, an old Jewish family of Tangier. The yellowing pages of the 19th-century guestbook refer to notable residents, Edgar Degas, Winston Churchill, and the Beat poets among them, and Bernardo Bertolucci's The Sheltering Sky was partly filmed here. It is located in the Medina area of the city and some of the rooms overlook the harbor.
