= Renzo Cesana =

Italian-American actor

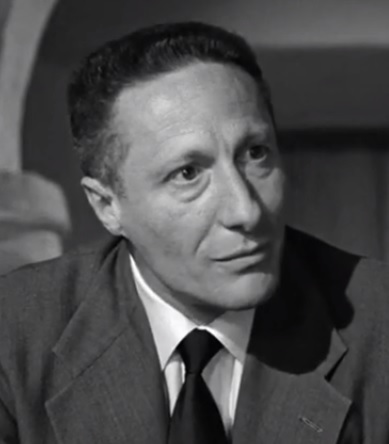
- Born: October 30, 1907; Rome, Italy
- Died: November 8, 1970 (aged 63); Hollywood, California, U.S.
- Occupation: Actor

Renzo Cesana (30 October 1907, Rome – 8 November 1970, Hollywood, California) was an actor, writer, composer, and songwriter most famed for his title role on the American television show The Continental. He was also known as Renato Cesana.

== Biography ==
Cesana was the grandson of Luigi Cesana, publisher of one of Rome's largest daily newspapers, Il Messaggero. He emigrated to America as a screenwriter in 1929, to adapt Metro-Goldwyn-Mayer "talkies" for Italian audiences. After a failed attempt at becoming a film star, he appeared on radio in San Francisco, then became the U.S. advertising director for a prominent Italian wine, eventually opening his own advertising agency. He returned to Italy to co-write and appear in childhood friend Roberto Rossellini's film Stromboli (1950), then returned to America in 1949 to begin a film and television acting career in Hollywood.

In an era when advertisers and advertising agencies played major roles in program creation and sponsorship, Cesana created The Continental as a radio program that he produced, wrote, and starred in for a Los Angeles station in 1951, where it directly followed The Lonesome Gal, in which a female disk jockey talked soothingly to male listeners. After a brief and unsuccessful run, Cesana convinced a local television station to broadcast a video version of The Continental, which was picked up by the CBS television network in 1952.

The program led to a recording contract with Capitol Records, in which the non-singer Cesana would recite the lyrics of romantic songs to a musical accompaniment. For instance, "Walk The Lonesome Night" was a big hit in which Cesana recited the lyrics along with a piano and a theater organ. It was released on the "Ultra-Lounge Vol. 7: The Crime Scene" as an extra track; but it received massive success when it was originally released.

In 1967, he appeared in That Girl, as Dr. Cessna – an "ink blot" interpreting personality analyst. On September 20, 1967, Cesana appeared in Bewitched, "Business Italian Style" (Season 4, Episode 3). He played an entrepreneur hoping to have Tate & Stephens Advertising Agency introduce Chef Romani Italian Foods to the American market.

He died of lung cancer at age 63 in Los Angeles.

== Filmography ==
Year	Title	Role	Notes
1950	Stromboli	The Priest	
1950	A Lady Without Passport	Asa Sestina, Deported Mobster	
1950	The Sound of Fury	Dr. Vido Simone	
1951	The Mark of the Renegade	Father Juan	
1951	The Light Touch	Father Dolzi	Uncredited
1952	California Conquest	Fray Lindos	
1958	Anna of Brooklyn	Il barone Trevassi	
1958	The Beautiful Legs of Sabrina	James	
1958	The Naked Maja	Bayeu	
1959	For the First Time	Angelo	
1959	The Moralist	The Police Commissioner	
1959	Hannibal		
1960	The Warrior Empress	Paeone	
1961	Francis of Assisi	Friar	Uncredited
1965	The Art of Love	Pepe de Winter	
1966	Three on a Couch	The Ambassador	
1972	Original: Do Not Project	Brother Dimension	(final film role)
