= Hotel MyContinental Sibiu =

Skyscraper hotels in Romania

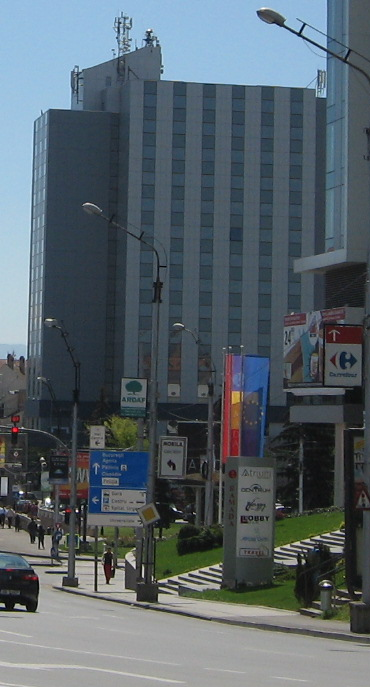

General information
- Status: Completed
- Location: Sibiu, Romania
- Coordinates: 45.79226570438383°N 24.147841978311234°E
- Construction started: 1982
- Opening: 1985

Height
- Roof: 58 m (190 ft)

Technical details
- Floor count: 13
- Floor area: 16,000 m^{2} (170,000 sq ft)

Hotel MyContinental Sibiu, formerly known as Hotel Ibis Sibiu Centre, and before that Hotel Continental, is a hotel building located in Sibiu. It has 13 floors and a surface of 16,000 m^{2}.
