= Casablanca Marriott Hotel =

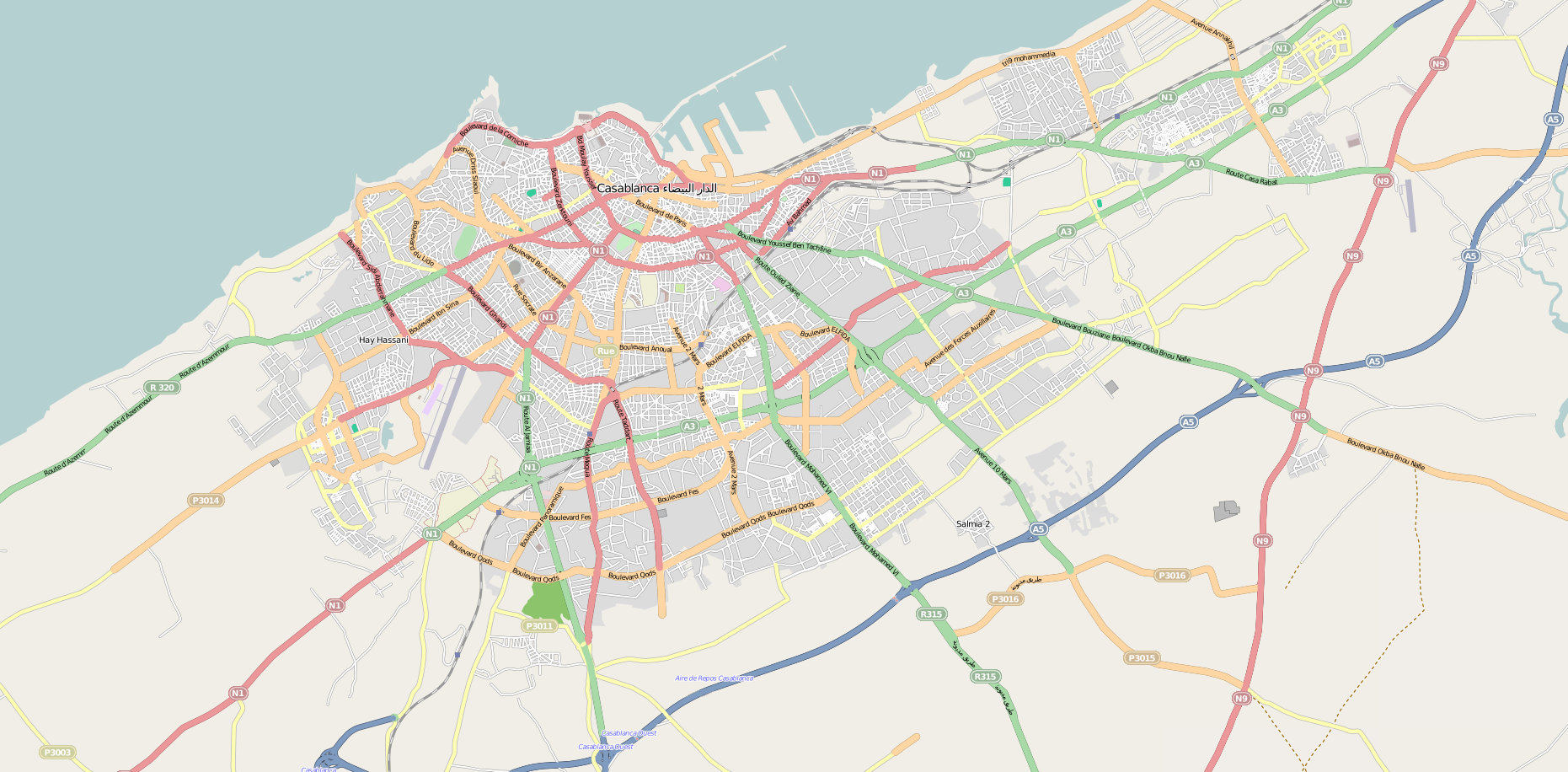
- Location within Greater Casablanca

General information
- Location: 100, Avenue des F.A.R, Casablanca, Morocco
- Coordinates: 33°35′46″N 7°36′42″W
- Operator: Marriott Hotels & Resorts

Technical details
- Floor count: 16

Other information
- Number of rooms: 286
- Number of restaurants: 3

Website
- www.marriott.com/en-us/hotels/cmnmc-casablanca-marriott-hotel/

The Casablanca Marriott Hotel is a five-star hotel in the Old Medina of Casablanca, Morocco. Operated by Marriott International under its flagship Marriott brand, the hotel has 286 rooms and is a notable business venue.

The hotel opened in 1989 as Sheraton Casablanca Hotel & Towers under Sheraton, then a part of ITT Corporation. In 2001, it had 306 rooms, 32 suites and 4 restaurants, so it is clear that several rooms have since been expanded as there are now 286. The Royal Suite was the finest and most expensive room of the hotel, followed by the Amiri Suite. The restaurants and bars of the hotel were El Andalous, Sakura, Dafra, Casbar Bar, Patio Bar and Caesar's Club. One of the hotel restaurants served Moroccan cuisine.

In 2020, the hotel was purchased by a joint venture set up by Actis and Westmont Hospitality Group in a deal valued at $50 million. It subsequently underwent a two-year renovation and was reflagged as a Marriott, which has been a sister brand of Sheraton since 2016, in November 2022.
