= Bridge of Lies =

Bridge of Lies Podul Minciunilor (ro) Lügenbrücke (de)
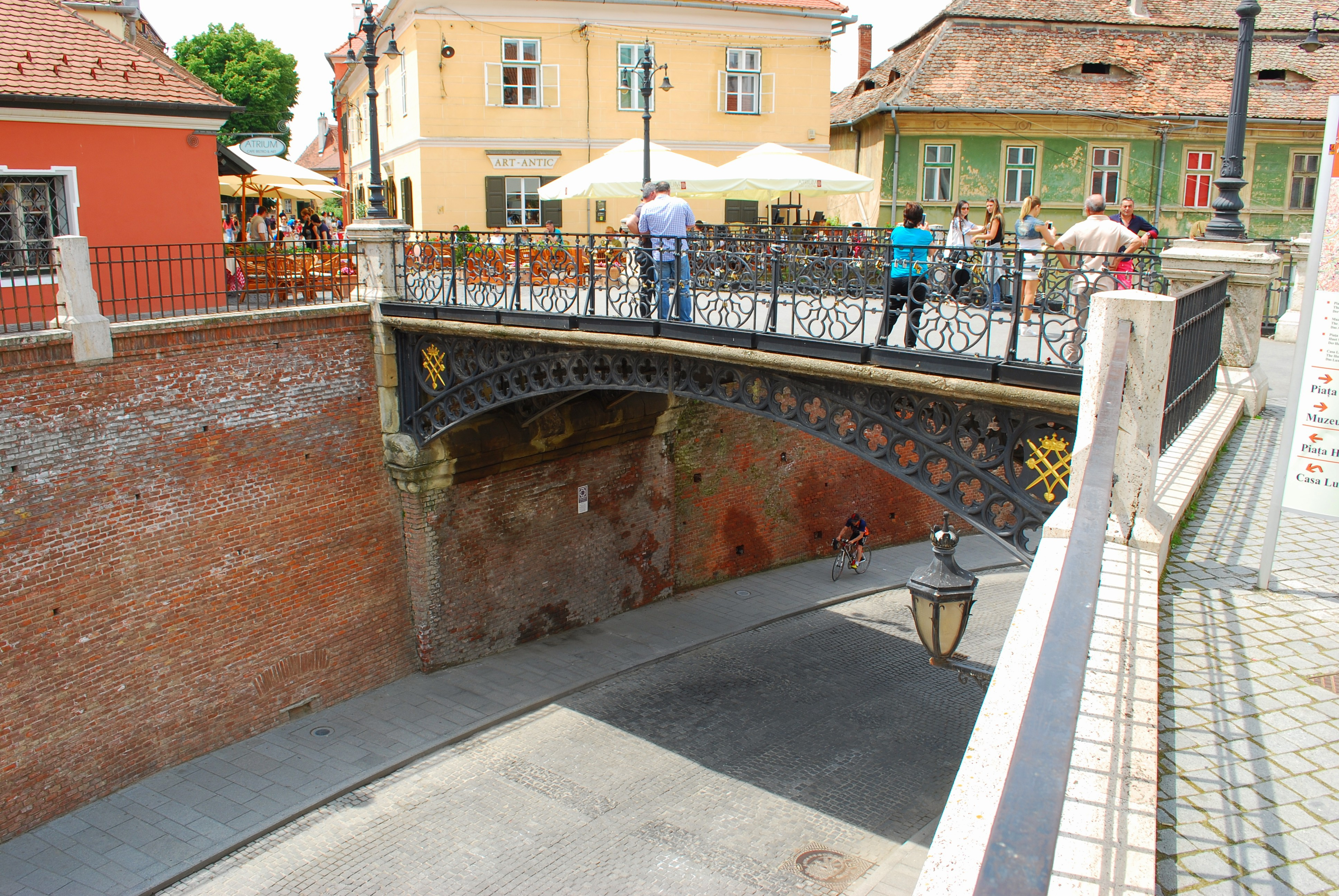
- Bridge of Lies in 2015
- Coordinates: 45.798408°N 24.150745°E
- Crosses: Strada Ocnei
- Locale: Sibiu, Transylvania, Romania

Characteristics
- Design: Arch bridge
- Material: Cast iron, stone
- Total length: 10.40 metres (34.1 ft)
- Width: 6 metres (20 ft)

History
- Construction start: 1859
- Construction end: 1860

Location
- Interactive map of Bridge of Lies

The Bridge of Lies (Romanian: Podul Minciunilor, German: Lügenbrücke) is a legendary pedestrian bridge located in the center of the Transylvanian city of Sibiu in central Romania. There are many legends surrounding the bridge because of its name. It is the first cast iron bridge built in what is today Romania.

Located in the Lesser Square of Sibiu, the bridge crosses Ocnei Street (Burgergasse) to connect the Lesser Square to the Huet Square.

== Legends ==
The Bridge of Lies has many legends surrounding it because of its name. The most popular one has it that the bridge will collapse when someone tells a lie while standing on it. Another legend says that the bridge was often crossed by merchants who were trying to fool their clients. The ones who were caught were tossed off the bridge. According to another legend, the bridge was a meeting place for boys attending the military academy and their girlfriends. The boys wouldn't show up, leaving their girlfriends to wait until realizing they have been lied to. One legend also has it that the bridge was often crossed by young lovers who swore each other eternal love. The girls swore that they were virgins, which often turned out to be a lie after the couples got married. As a punishment, they were thrown off the bridge, since it was the place where they had lied to their lovers. Another legend about the bridge talks about how there may have been a large lake underneath the bridge, in which freshwater mermaids lived. They would lie to their merman husbands to meet their mortal lovers on the bridge above. Then, they would jump off into the lake when finished.

Despite all the legends, its name has a different origin. The bridge was initially called Liegebrücke, German for lying bridge (lying as in "to lie down"), which sounds very similar to Lügenbrücke, meaning "bridge of lies". The legends have helped the latter spread among the city's people, which is how the bridge came to get its current name.

== Design and architecture ==
The bridge is sustained by four arches made of cast iron. They are decorated with Neo-Gothic motifs. On the southernmost arch stands the coat of arms of Sibiu, while on the northernmost one stand the inscriptions 1859 and Friedrichshütte respectively, the latter being the name of the foundry that delivered a part of the bridge's components.

The rails are made out of eight panels with circular shapes and Gothic decorations.

== Gallery ==
The bridge as seen from Strada Ocnei

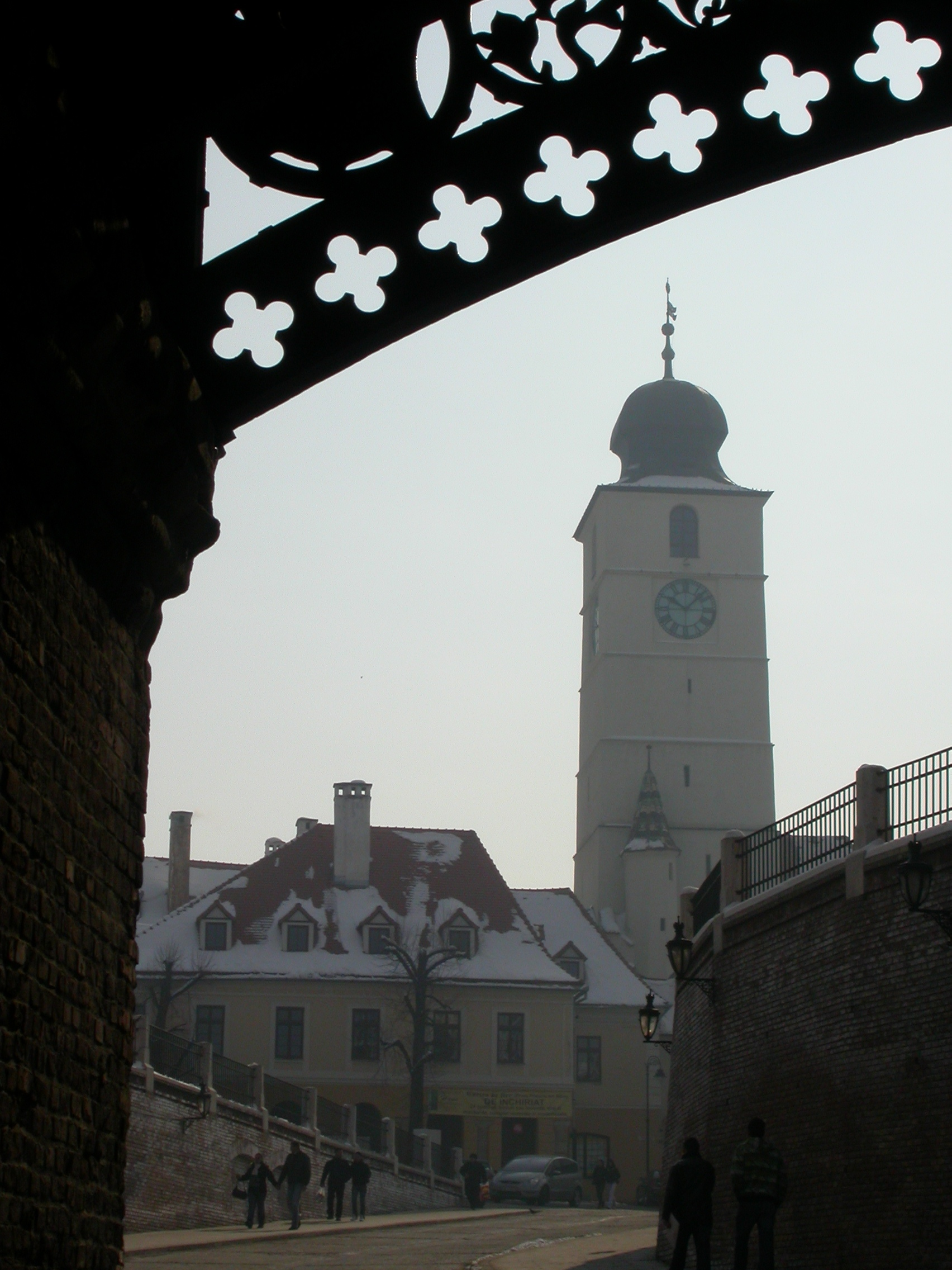
Neo-Gothic decoration on the arches. The Council Tower is in the background

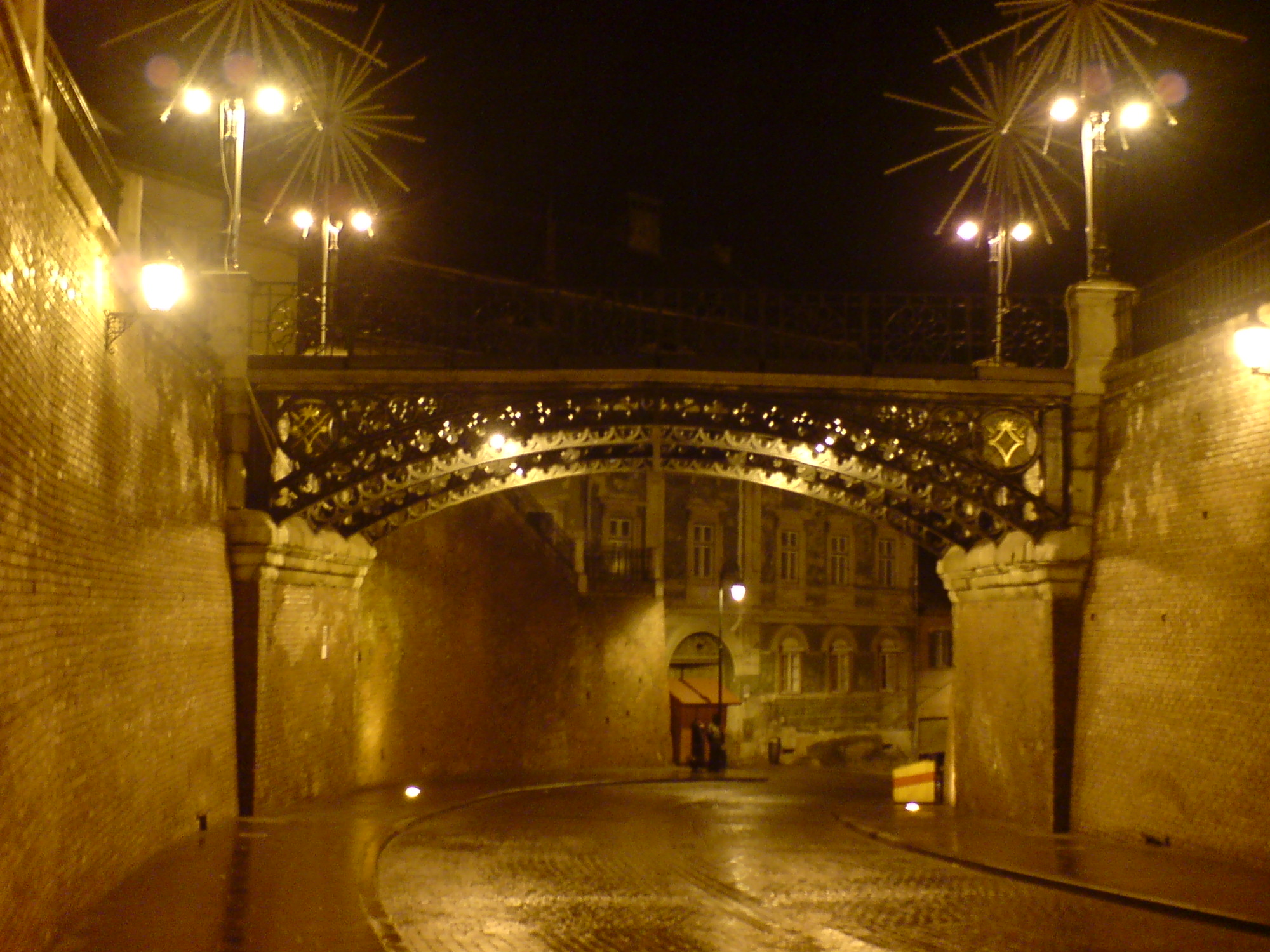
At night

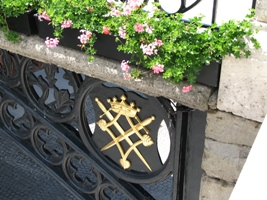
Coat of arms of Sibiu

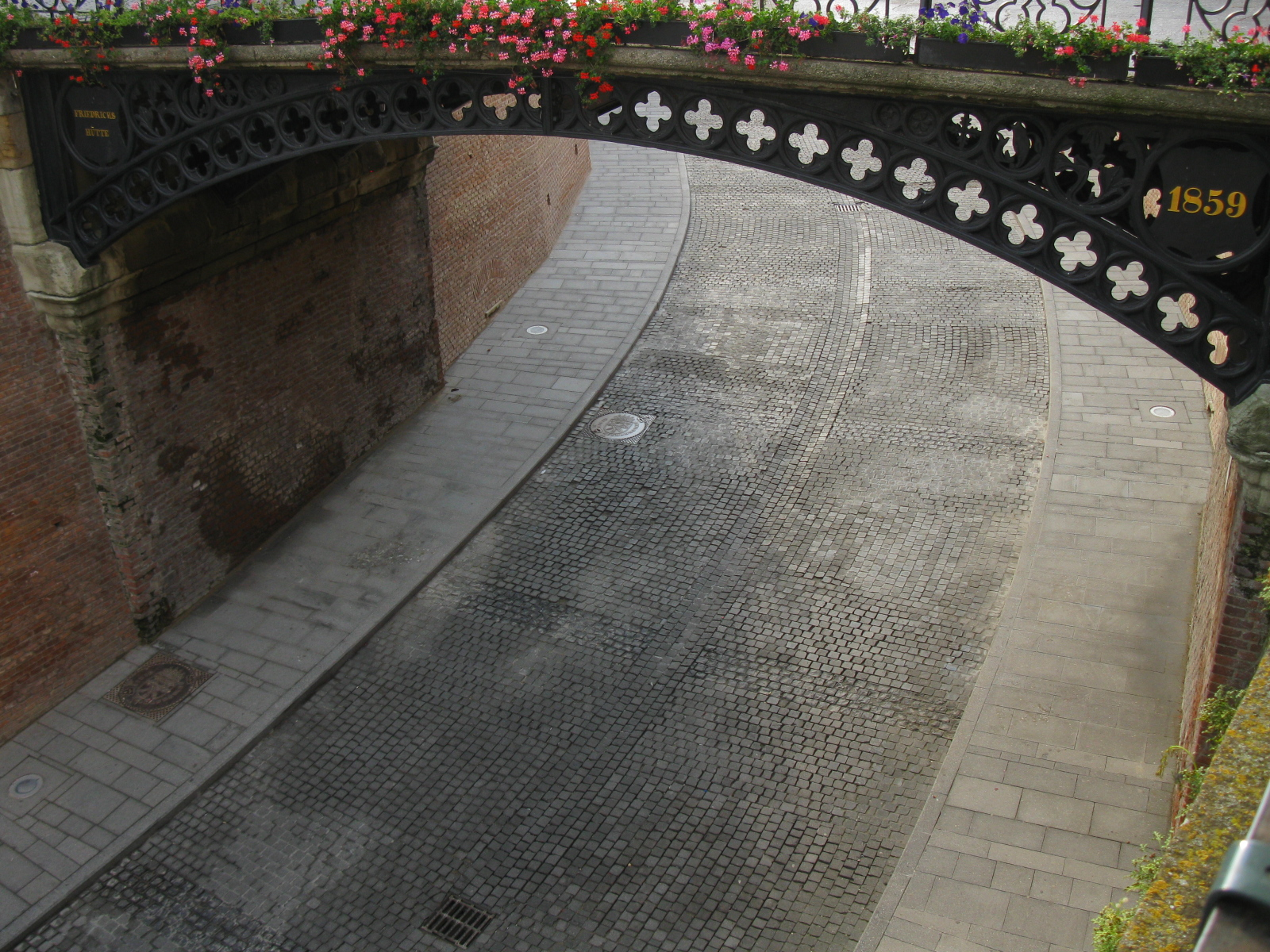
northernmost arch

== See also ==
- Bridge of Sighs – another bridge with legends regarding its name
- Eyes of Sibiu
- Council Tower of Sibiu
- Sibiu Lutheran Cathedral
