= Brukenthal National Museum =

Museum in Sibiu, Romania

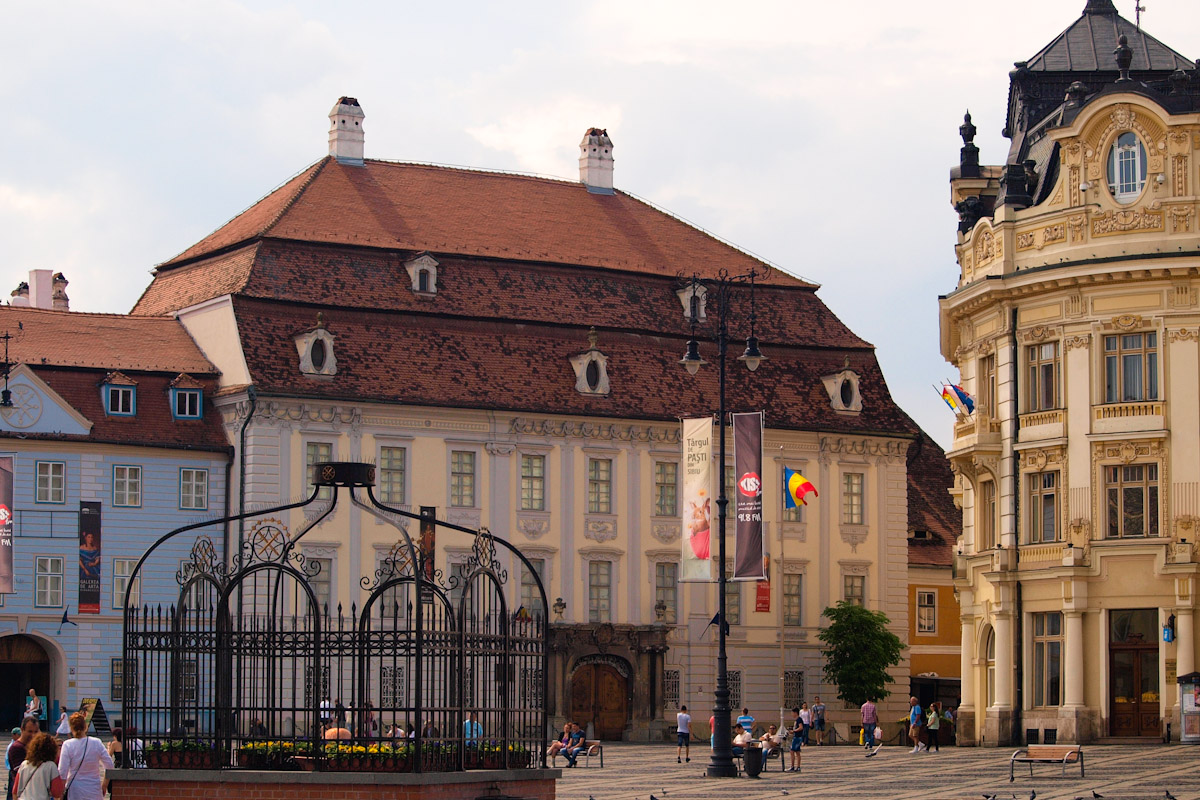
- Brukenthal National Museum, Sibiu
- Interactive fullscreen map
- Location: Sibiu, Transylvania, Romania
- Coordinates: 45°47′47″N 24°09′02″E

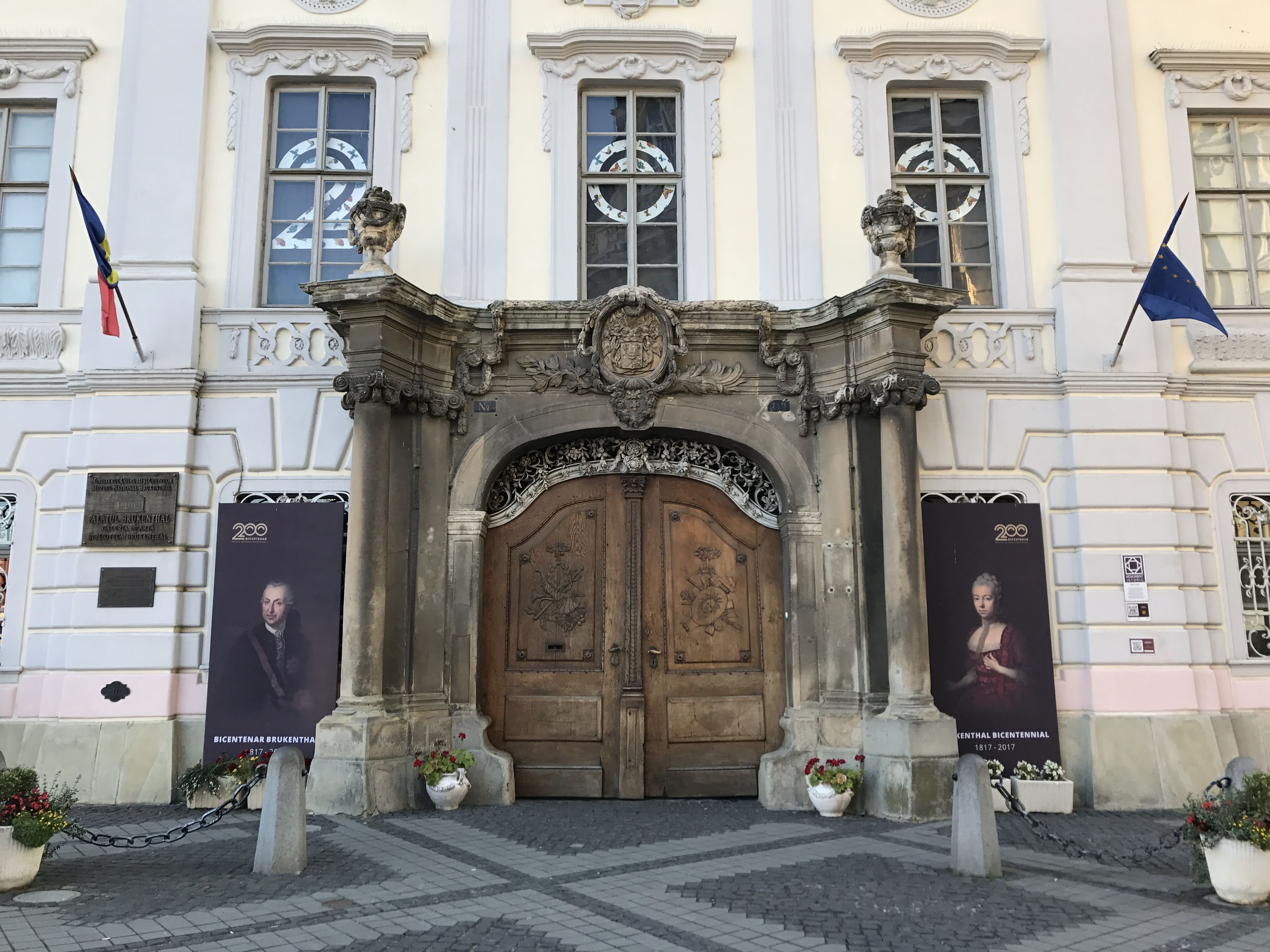
Entrance to the museum

The Brukenthal National Museum (Romanian: Muzeul Național Brukenthal; German: Brukenthalmuseum) is a museum in Sibiu, Transylvania, Romania, established in the late 18th century by Samuel von Brukenthal (1721-1803) in his city palace. Baron Brukenthal, governor of the Grand Principality of Transylvania established his first collections around 1790. The collections were officially opened to the public in 1817, making the museum the oldest institution of its kind on the territory of modern-day Romania.

Today, in its extended form, it is a complex comprising six museums, which, without being separate administrative entities, are situated in different locations around the city and have their own distinct cultural programmes.

== The Art Galleries ==
The Art Galleries are located inside the Brukenthal Palace and include about 1,200 works belonging to the main European schools of painting, from the 15th to the 18th century: Flemish-Dutch, German and Austrian, Italian, Spanish and French Schools. The Galleries also include collections of engravings, books, numismatics, and minerals.

== Gallery ==
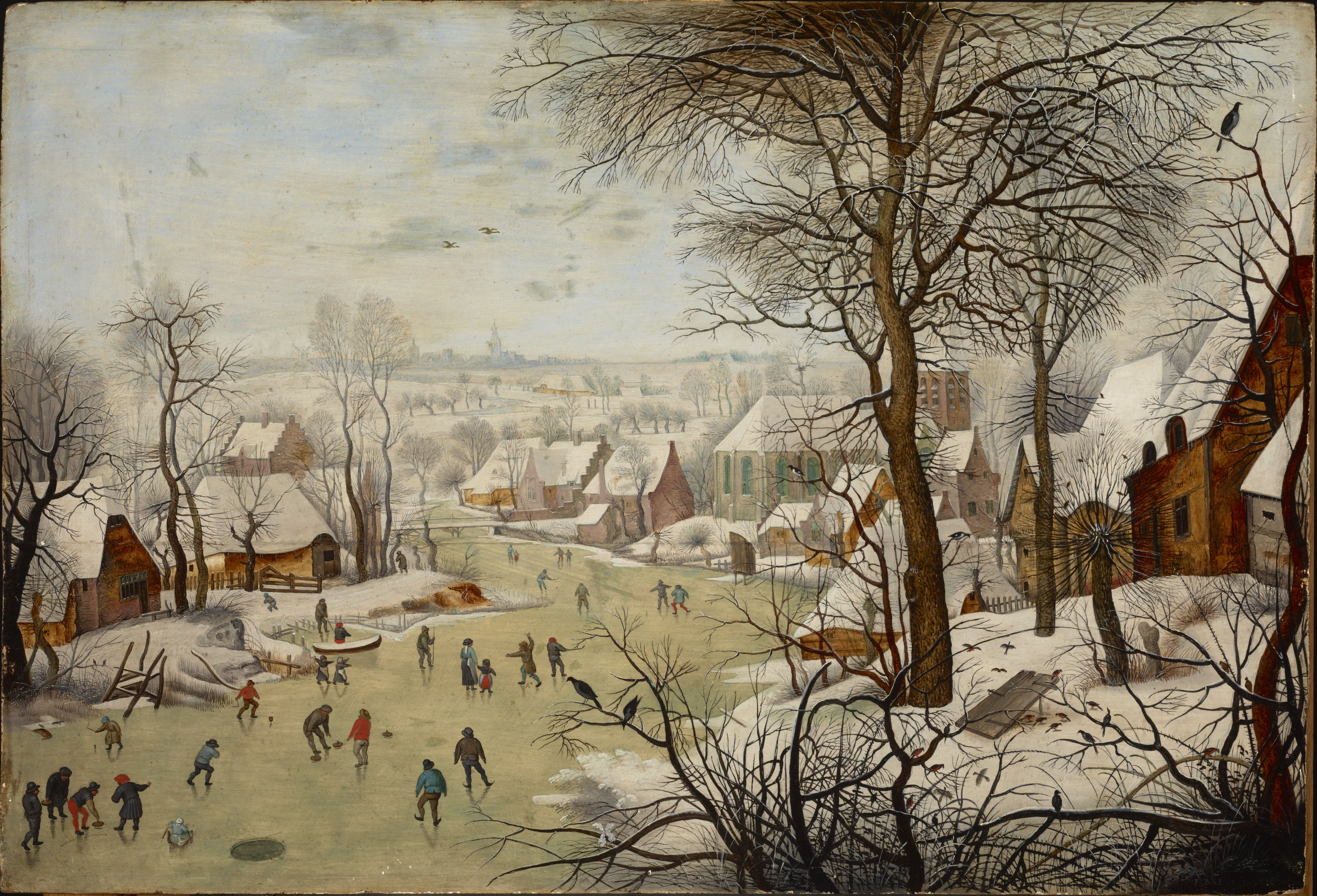
Winter Landscape with Bird Trap by Pieter Brueghel the Younger
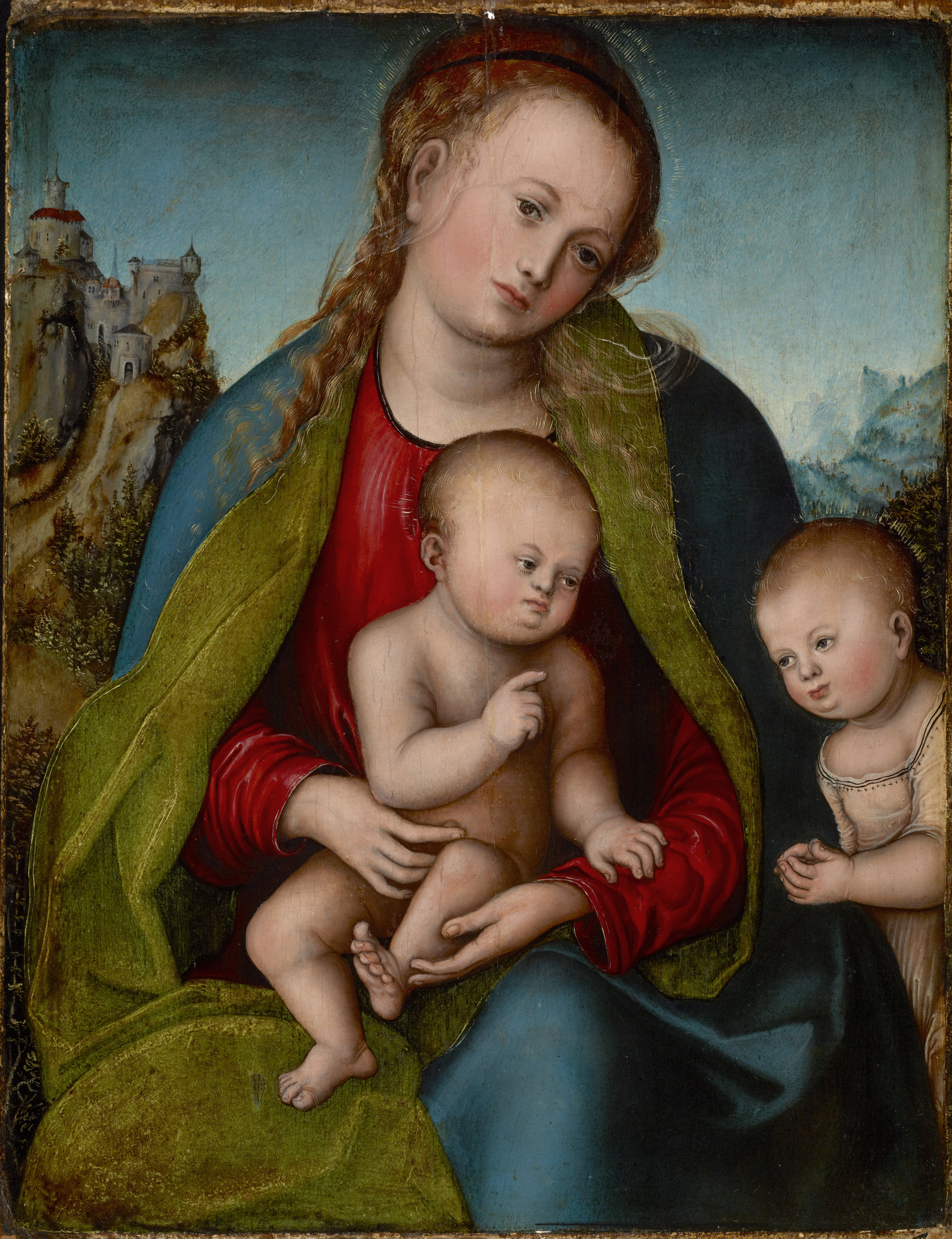
Madonna and Child with the Infant John the Baptist by Lucas Cranach the Elder

== The Brukenthal Library ==
The Brukenthal Library is also located inside the Brukenthal Palace. It comprises approximately 300,000 library units (manuscripts, incunables, rare foreign books, old Romanian-language books, contemporary books and specialised magazines) including the highly illuminated 16th-century Brukenthal Breviary, a book of hours.

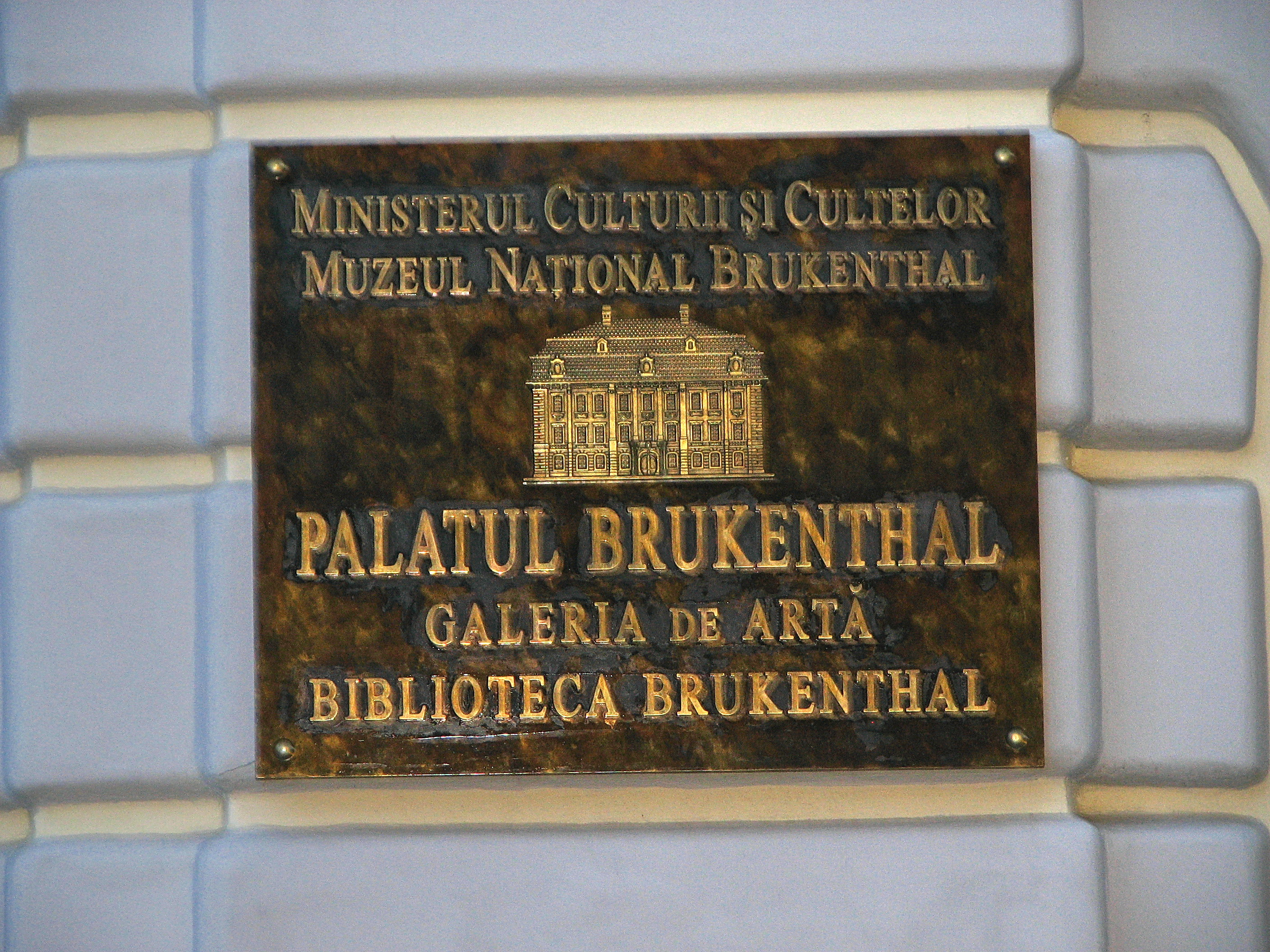
Entrance plaque.

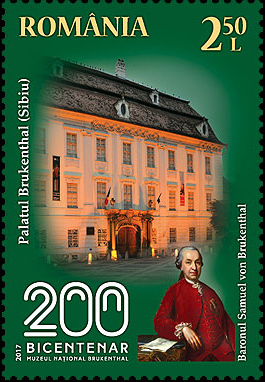
A 2017 stamp dedicated to the 200th anniversary of the museum

== The Museum of History ==
The Museum of History is part of a building which is considered to be the most important ensemble of non-religious Gothic architecture in Transylvania. The museum initially focused its activities on representing the historic characteristics of Hermannstadt (Nagyszeben, present Sibiu) and its surroundings, but in time it has come to reflect the entire area of Southern Transylvania.

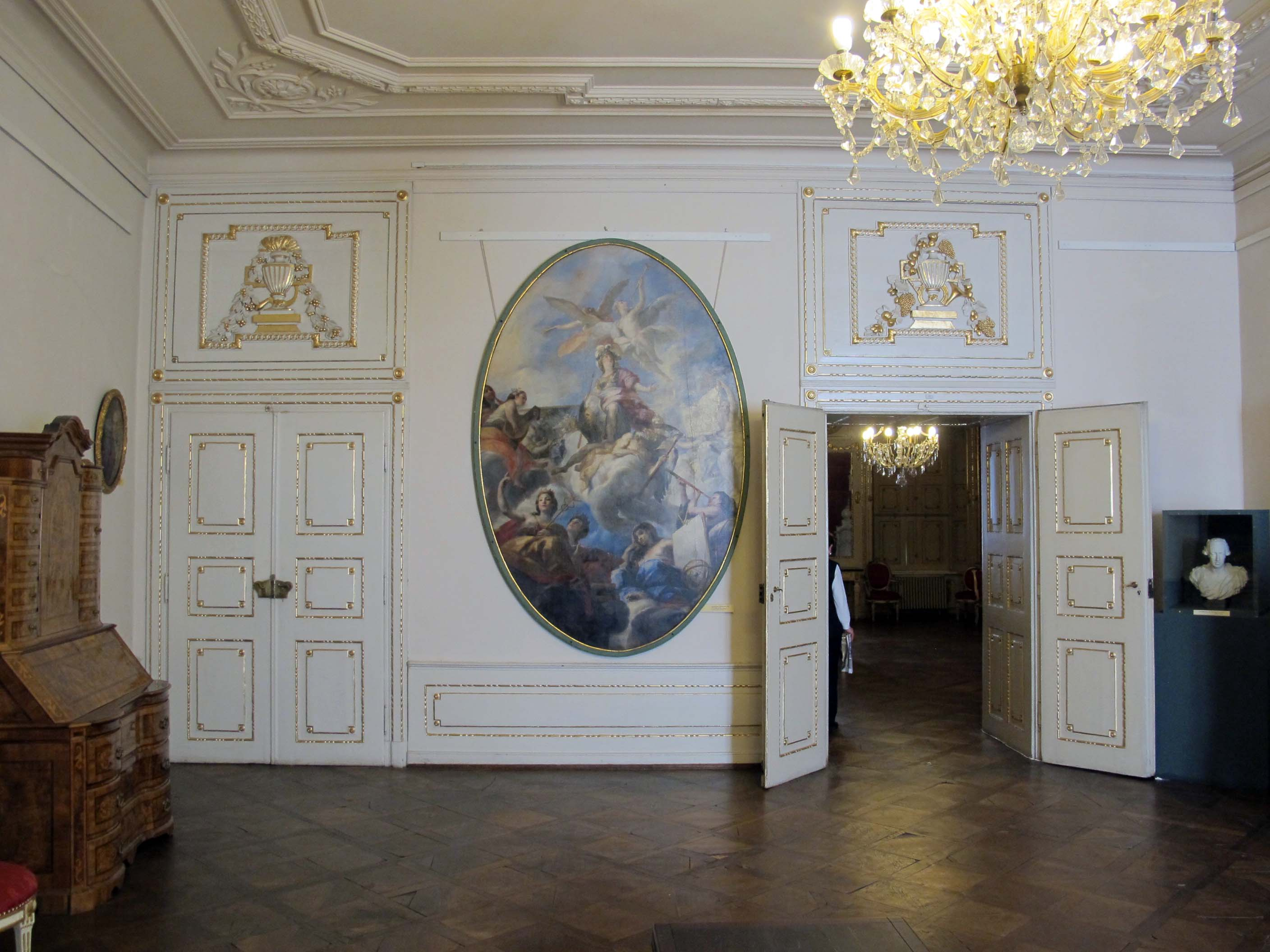

== The Museum of Pharmacology ==
The Museum of Pharmacology is located in an historical building dated 1569, where one of the oldest pharmacies in present-day Romania was located. It is the basement of this house where Samuel Hahnemann invented homeopathy and developed his version of treatment. Some of his phials and plans are on display. The furniture is in Viennese style. The exhibition is organized on the structure of a classical pharmacy that includes two laboratories, a homeopathic sector and a documentation sector. It contains over 6,000 ancient medical instruments and dispensing tools from the time when Sibiu was home to more chemists than anywhere else in Transylvania. At the front, a reconstructed shop is decked out with wooden counters and stacks of glass jars creating the atmosphere of an 18th-century apothecary. A valuable collection of wooden pharmaceutical jars, marked with paint, is also featured.

== The Museum of Natural History ==
The Museum of Natural History began to take shape in 1849, through the foundation of the Transylvanian Society of Natural Sciences (German: Siebenbürgischer Verein für Naturwissenschaften), which had as members important local and foreign figures in science and culture. The collections of the museum comprise over 1 million exhibits (including mineralogy-petrography, palaeontology, botany, entomology, malacology, the zoology of the vertebrates, amphibians, reptiles, as well as ichthyology, ornithology, and the zoology of mammals).

== The Museum of Arms and Hunting Trophies ==
The Museum of Arms and Hunting Trophies reflects the evolution in time of weapons and hunting tools. Important is as well the collection of trophies belonging to the collections Witting and A. Spiess, the last one comprising 1,058 items acquired in 1963. Opened for the public in 1966 in Spiess House, the exhibition contains now over 1,500 units. Some traditional hunting procedures are also exhibited, including contemporary engravings. Aspects of the animal life and suitable times for hunting them are also presented here.

== See also ==
- Samuel von Brukenthal National College
- Eyes of Sibiu
- Council Tower of Sibiu
