= Jesuit Church, Sibiu =

Church in Sibiu, Romania

Coordinates: 45.7971°N 24.1512°E

Jesuit Church
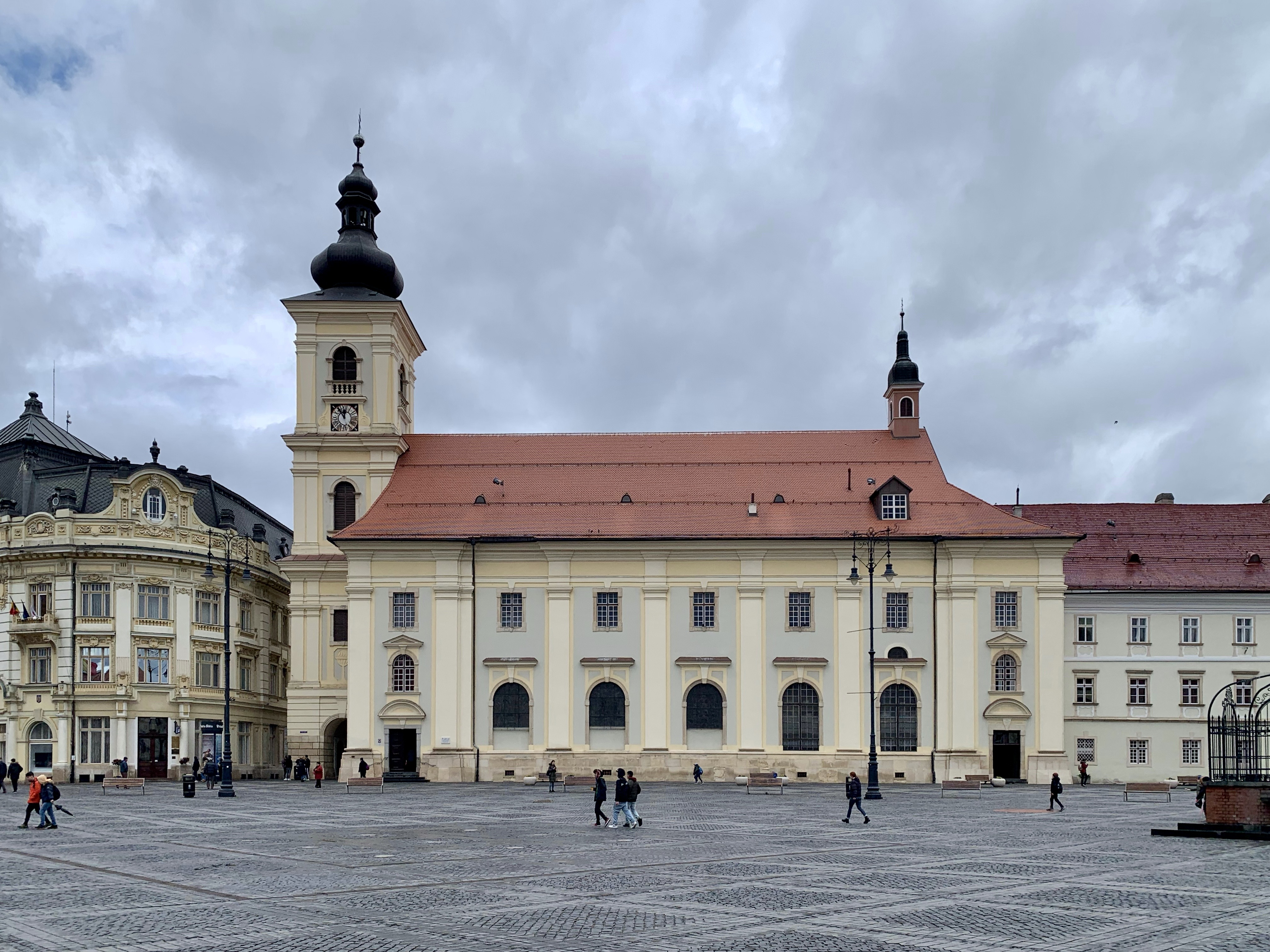
- Jesuit Church in Sibiu, Romania as seen from the Big Square

Religion
- Affiliation: Roman Catholic Archdiocese of Alba Iulia
- Year consecrated: 1733

Location
- Location: Sibiu
- Interactive map of Jesuit Church

Architecture
- Type: Church
- Style: Baroque
- Groundbreaking: 1726
- Completed: 1733

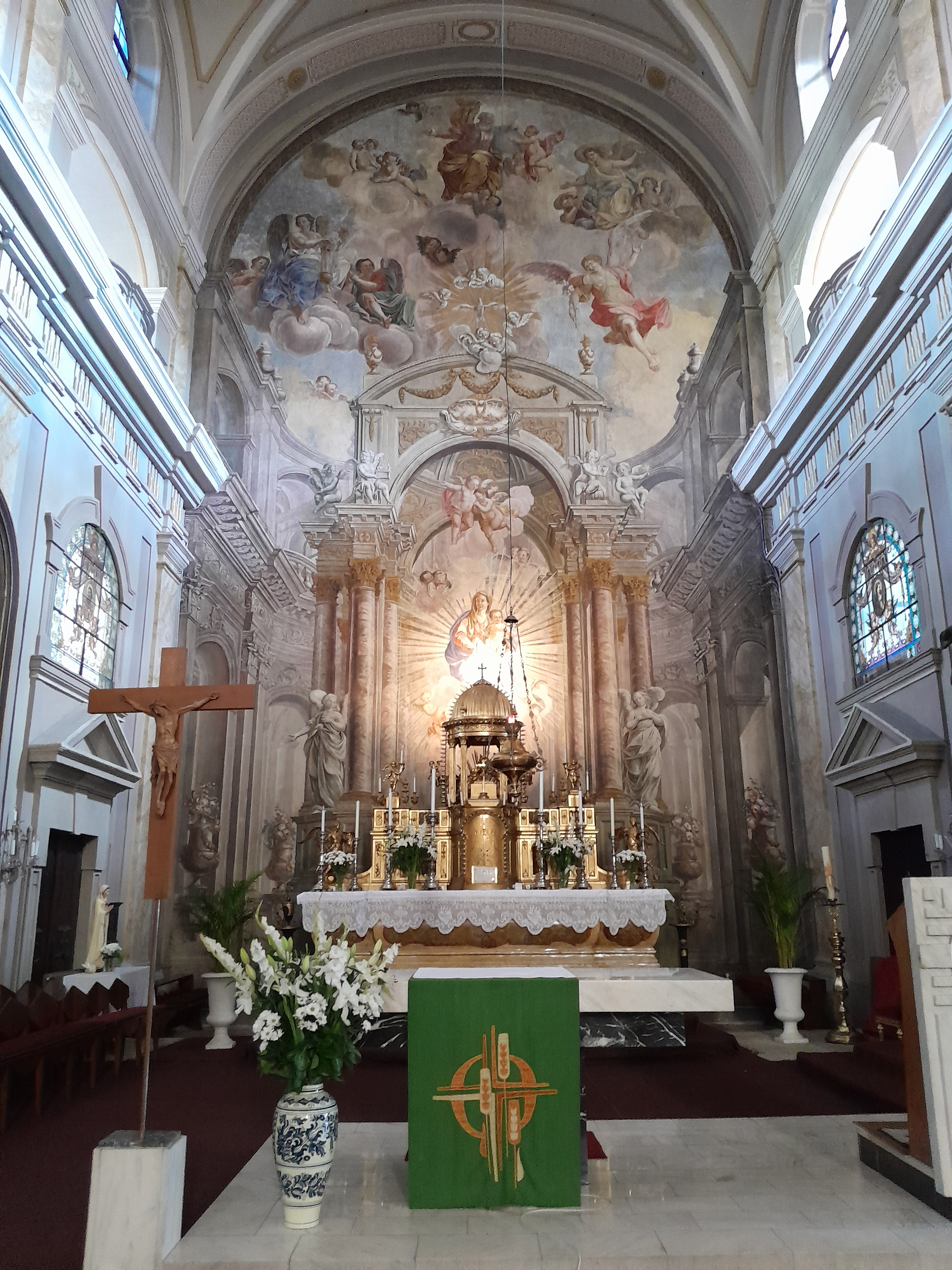
Interior

Jesuit Church (Romanian: Biserica Iezuiților), otherwise the Church of the Holy Trinity (Biserica Sfânta Treime), is a Roman Catholic church located at 3 Piața Mare, Sibiu, Romania. Immediately adjacent to Brukenthal Palace, it is one of the most notable baroque churches in Transylvania.

The church is listed as a historic monument by Romania's Ministry of Culture and Religious Affairs.

Carmen Iohannis, the wife of president Klaus Iohannis, sings in the choir of this church.

== See also ==
- Eyes of Sibiu
- Gheorghe Lazăr National College, the former Jesuit Gymnasium of Sibiu
- Sibiu Lutheran Cathedral
- Council Tower of Sibiu
- List of Jesuit sites
