= Sibiu Lutheran Cathedral =

Church in Sibiu, Romania

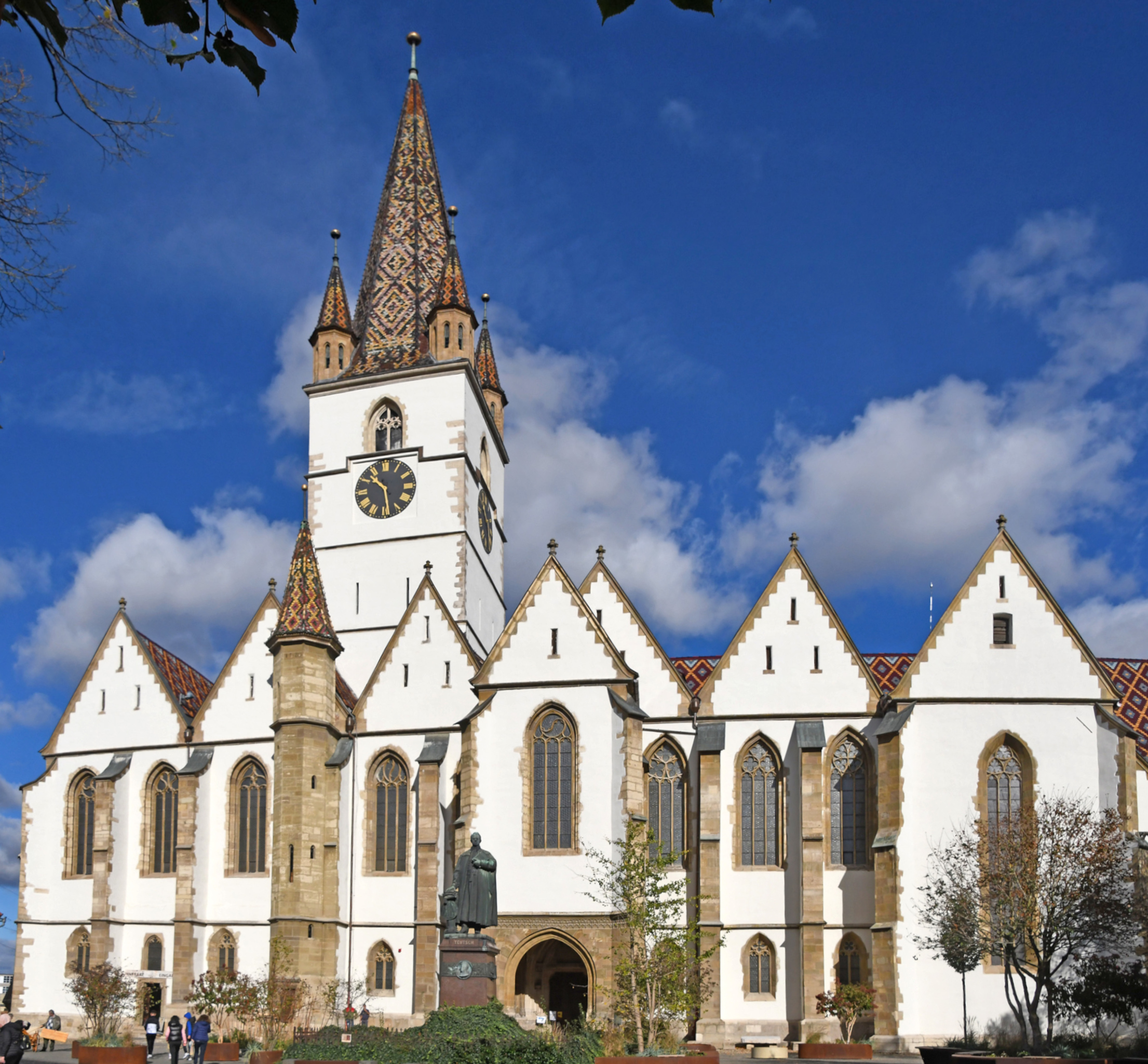
- View of the main facade of the Evangelical Lutheran Cathedral in Sibiu/Hermannstadt

Religion
- Affiliation: Evangelical Church of Augustan Confession in Romania
- Region: Sibiu
- Ecclesiastical or organisational status: Cathedral
- Status: Active

Location
- Location: Huet Square, Sibiu, Romania
- Interactive map of Sibiu Lutheran Cathedral
- Coordinates: 45.7978°N 24.1498°E

Architecture
- Type: Church
- Style: Gothic
- Groundbreaking: 1371
- Completed: 1520

Specifications
- Direction of façade: South
- Height (max): 73.34 metres (240.6 ft)

The Lutheran Cathedral of Saint Mary (German: Evangelische Stadtpfarrkirche in Hermannstadt, Romanian: Biserica Evanghelică din Sibiu) is the most famous Gothic-style church in Sibiu (German: Hermannstadt), Transylvania, central Romania. Its massive 73.34 m high steeple is a landmark of the city. The four turrets situated on top of the steeple are said to have been a sign to let foreigners know that the town had the right to sentence to death. It belongs to the Lutheran, German-speaking Evangelical Church of Augustan Confession in Romania.

== History ==
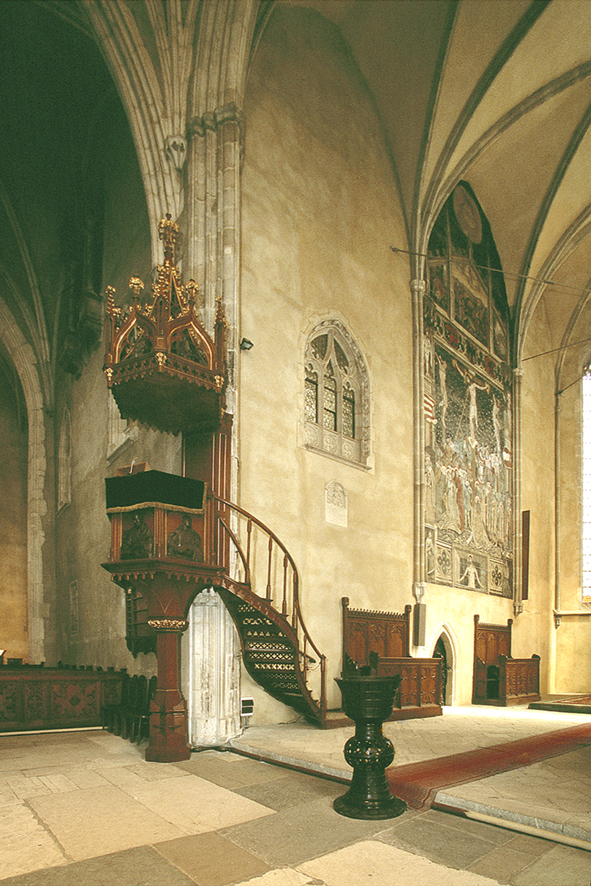
The pulpit and baptismal font of the cathedral. The Rosenau Fresco can be seen in the background.

The Sibiu Lutheran Cathedral was built in the 14th century on the location of another 12th-century romanesque church. Originally, it was the Catholic parish church of St. Mary. However, in the middle of the 16th century, it became a Lutheran parish, as Johannes Honter converted the Transylvanian Saxons to Protestantism. For three centuries, it served as a burial place for the mayors, earls and other personalities from Sibiu. This practice was banned in 1796 but one exception was made in 1803, when baron Samuel von Brukenthal was laid to rest in the crypt.

The cathedral had electric lighting and heating installed in 1910. A renovation was completed in 2021.

== Structure and organs ==
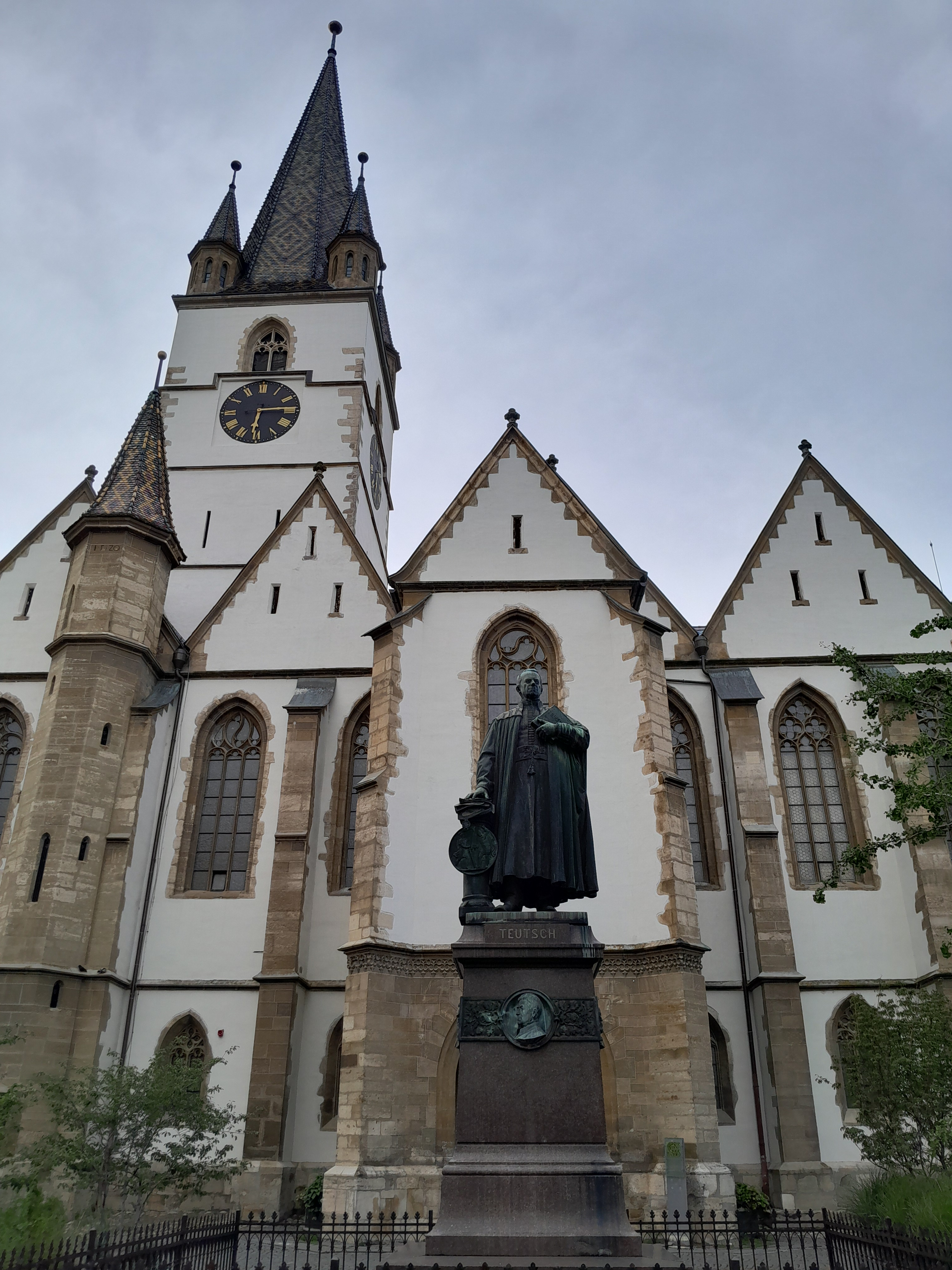
Cathedral in 2025

The Lutheran Cathedral houses two large organs. The first organ is said to have been brought to the church in 1350, however, the current Sauer Organ was built from 1914 to 1915. With 78 registers, the Sauer Organ is the largest instrument in Transylvania.

On the south balcony is the Hahn Organ, built in 1748 by Transylvanian organ builder Johannes Hahn. Originally, this instrument was built for the parish church in Boarta, and it was housed at the Samuel von Brukenthal National College until being moved to the Cathedral in 1948. It was restored in 1988 and 2008.

The nave of the cathedral houses several notable epitaphs, including that of Samuel von Brukenthal. Also of interest is a large fresco, dating to 1445, which depicts scenes from the life, passion, and ascension of Jesus Christ. This fresco is named the Rosenau Fresco after its creator, the artist Johannes von Rosenau. The cathedral's bronze baptismal font is said to have been made using a molten Ottoman cannon.

== Burials ==
- Mihnea cel Rău
- Samuel von Brukenthal

== See also ==
- Eyes of Sibiu
- Council Tower of Sibiu
- Jesuit Church, Sibiu
- Paul Wiener
