= Council Tower of Sibiu =

Tower in Sibiu, Romania

The Council Tower of Sibiu (Romanian: Turnul Sfatului, German: Hermannstädter Ratsturm) is a tower situated between the two main squares of the Historic center in Sibiu, the Great Square (Piața Mare) and the Small Square (Piața Mică).

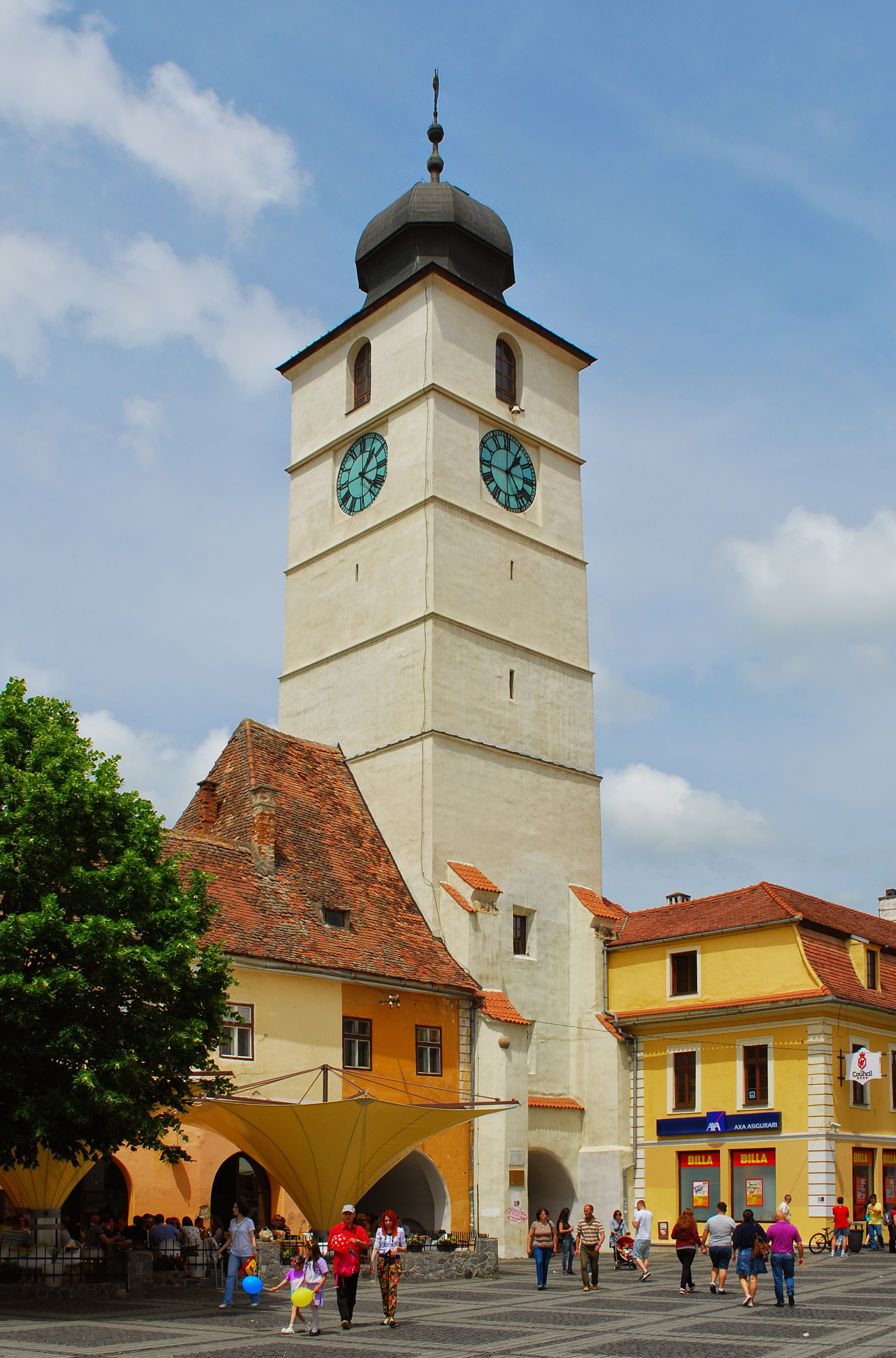
Council Tower of Sibiu

It was built in the 12th century, but was also rebuilt multiple times, with its architecture getting changed.

In the course of history, the tower played different roles, being used, among others, as a wheat storage or as an observation point in case of fire. Nowadays, it is used for exhibitions.

The Council Tower is considered the most iconic building of Sibiu, which was the European Capital of Culture in 2007. Being the city's symbol, it is often found on Sibiu souvenirs or any kind of advertisement relating to the city.

== See also ==
- Eyes of Sibiu
- Sibiu Lutheran Cathedral
- Jesuit Church of Sibiu
- Bridge of Lies
