= Eyes of Sibiu =

Eyebrow dormers

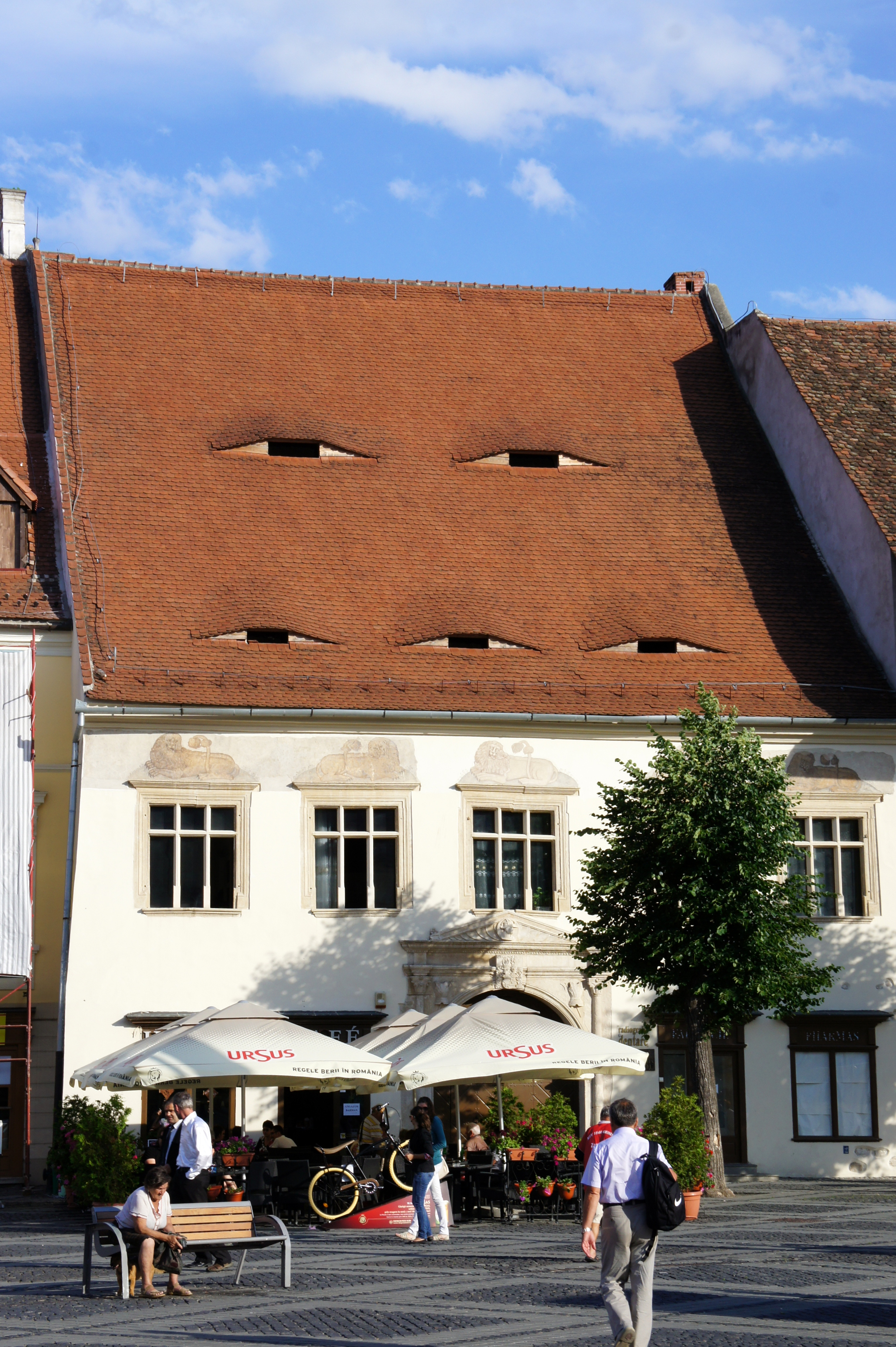
Haller House, Piața Mare, Sibiu

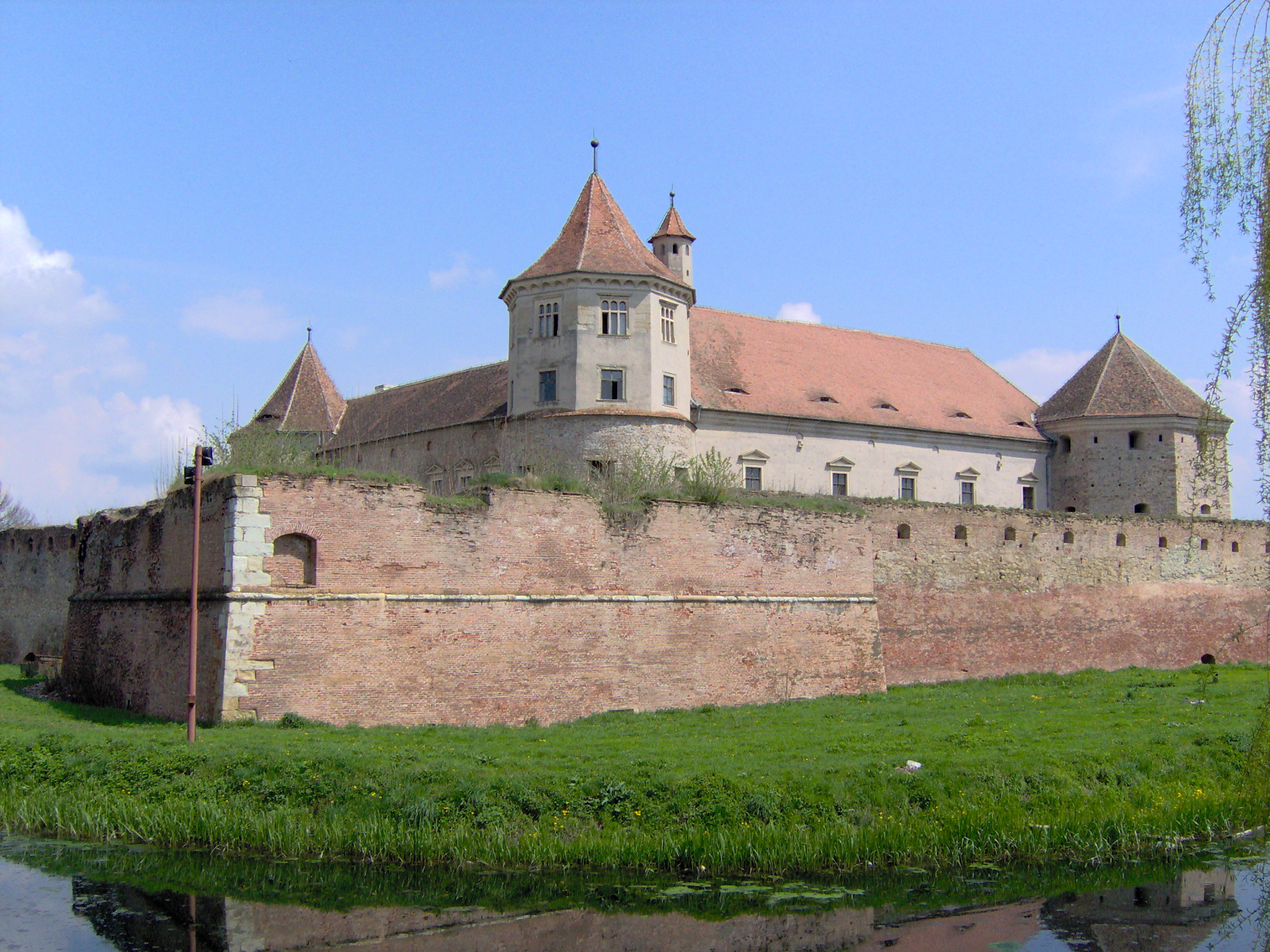
Sibiu eyes on the Făgăraș Citadel, an example outside of Sibiu County

The Eyes of Sibiu (German: Augen von Hermannstadt, Romanian: Ochii din Sibiu) are the iconic eyebrow dormers on the roofs of Sibiu's houses. Sibiu lies in Transylvania, a historical region of Romania. The eyes, which are a symbol and a tourist attraction of the city, have given Sibiu the nicknames of The City with Eyes, The City Where Houses Don't Sleep and the portmanteau Seebiu. They vary in shape – most of them are trapezoid-shaped, others have rounded or elongated forms.

In Romanian, they are called Ochii Sibiului, while in German they are known as die Augen von Hermannstadt, Hermannstadt being the German name of Sibiu.

== History ==
Although the eyes originate from as early as the 15th century, most of them were built in the 19th century. They were most likely invented by a local of Sibiu, because they are widespread in the city and its surroundings. They are an element of Baroque architecture. Some of them were even built as late as the 20th century, after Sibiu became part of the Kingdom of Romania.

== Purpose ==
There are legends, according to which the eyes were built to frighten the people, making them believe they are being watched. Their real purpose was to act as a ventilation system for the houses' attics. Nowadays, the eyes have become one of Sibiu's most famous symbols, making them a tourist attraction.

In 2017, the eyes became a symbol of Romania's anti-corruption fight, being used by the organisation Vă vedem din Sibiu ("We see you from Sibiu").

== Spread ==
Apart from Sibiu itself, the eyes have also been built in the city's surroundings. Most of them are found in the Sibiu County. Some of them can also be found in other nearby places, like the cities of Brașov and Făgăraș, both located in the Brașov County.

Additionally, some examples which are probably unrelated can also be found in the city of Timișoara in western Romania. Similar eyebrow dormers can also be found on traditional rural Romanian houses or on cule in the historical region of Oltenia.

== Gallery ==
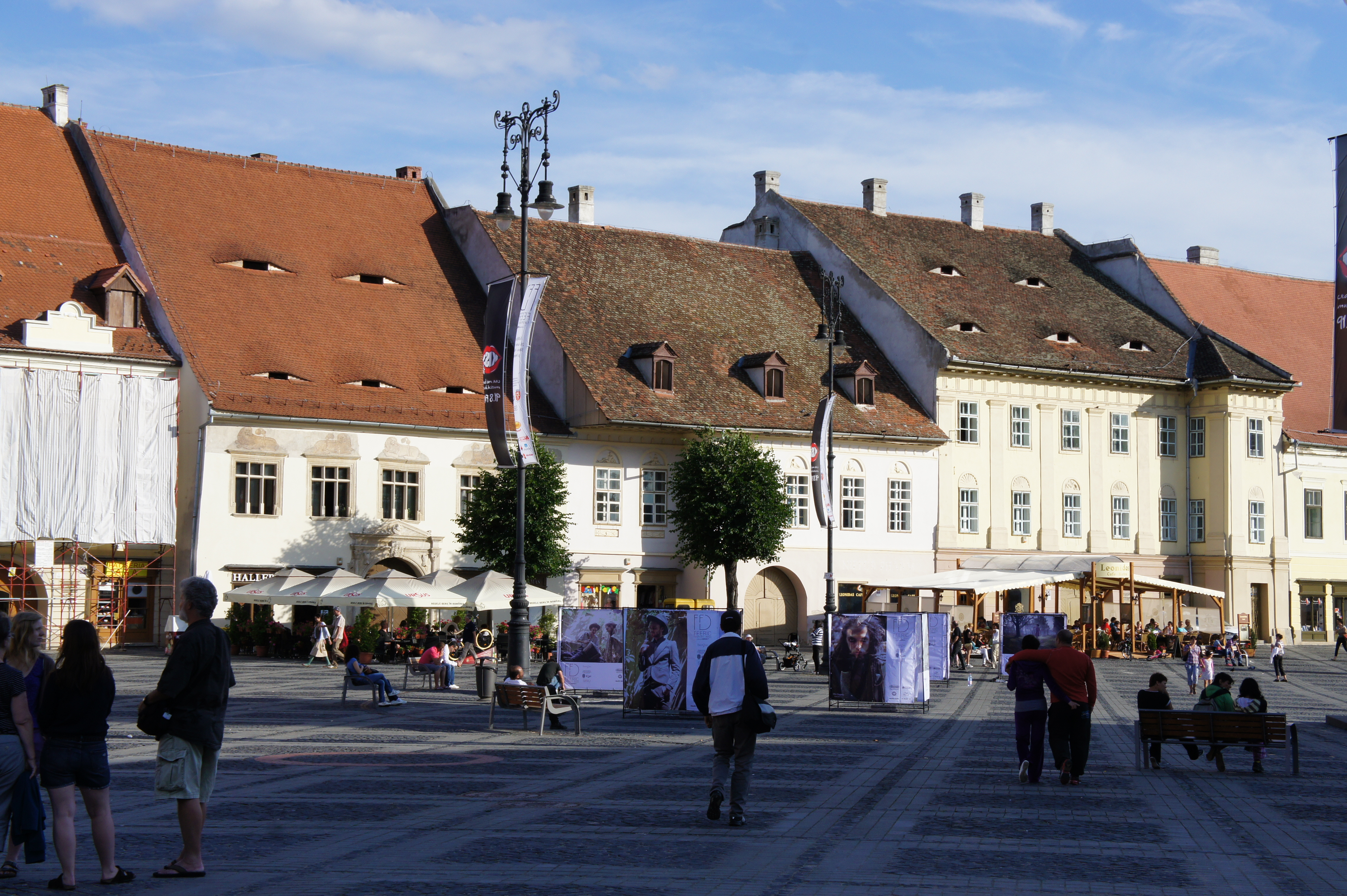
The Piața Mare in Sibiu

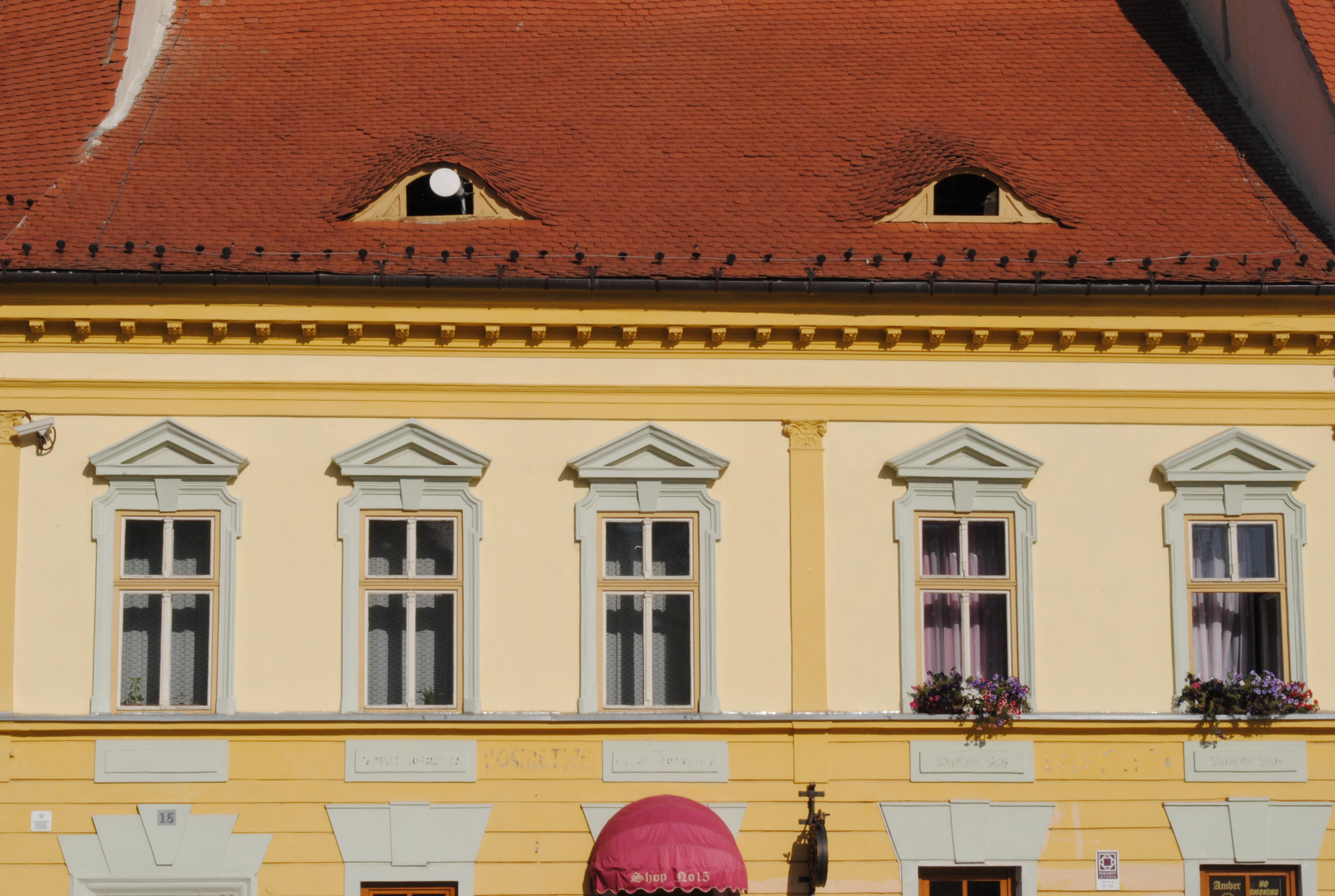
A rounded version of the eyes, Grand Square of Sibiu

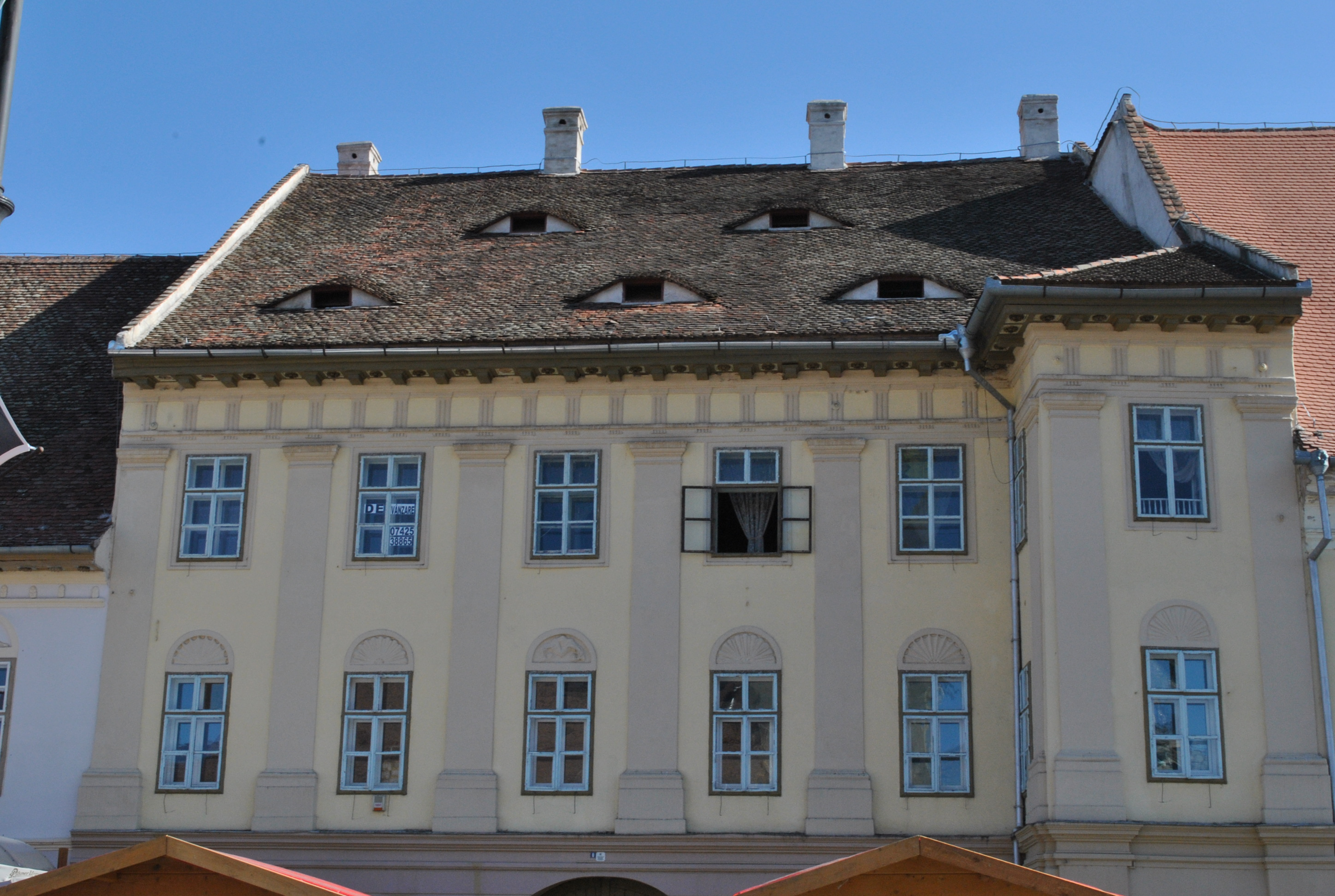
Hecht House (Casa Hecht), Grand Square of Sibiu

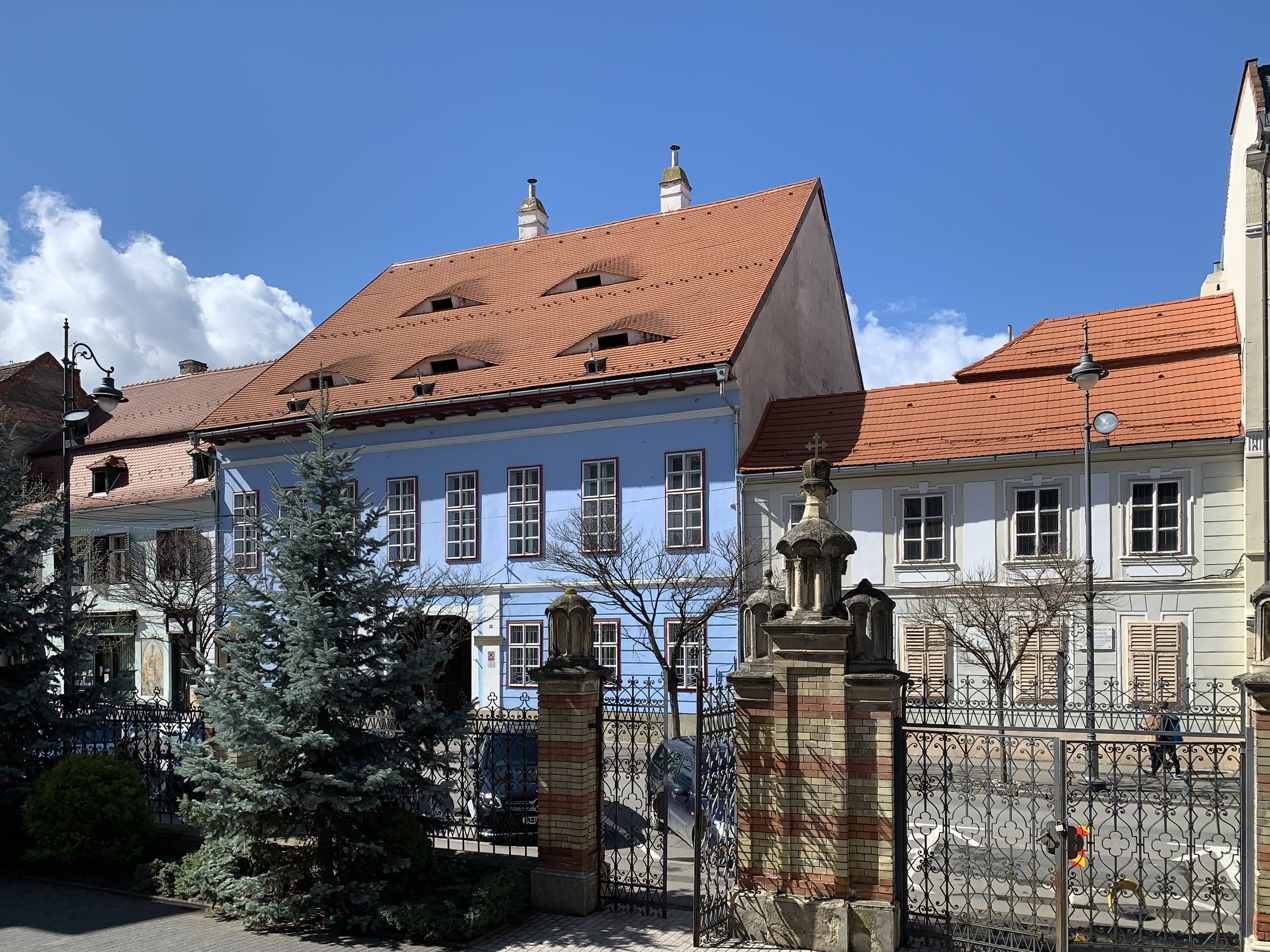
Building of Orthodox Metropolitan See of Transylvania, Sibiu

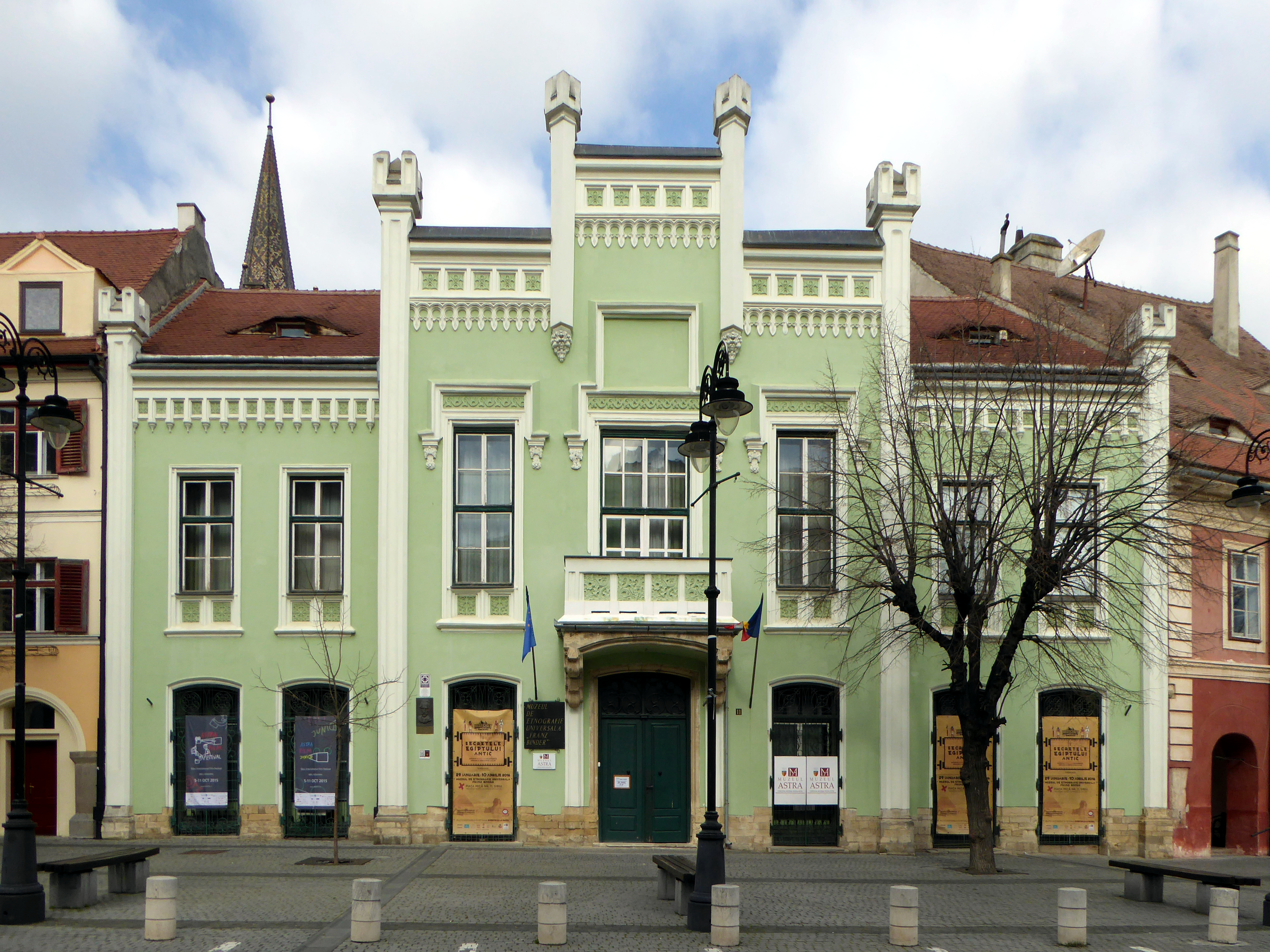
Neo-Gothic Hermes House (Casa Hermes), Lesser Square (Romanian: Piața Micul) of Sibiu

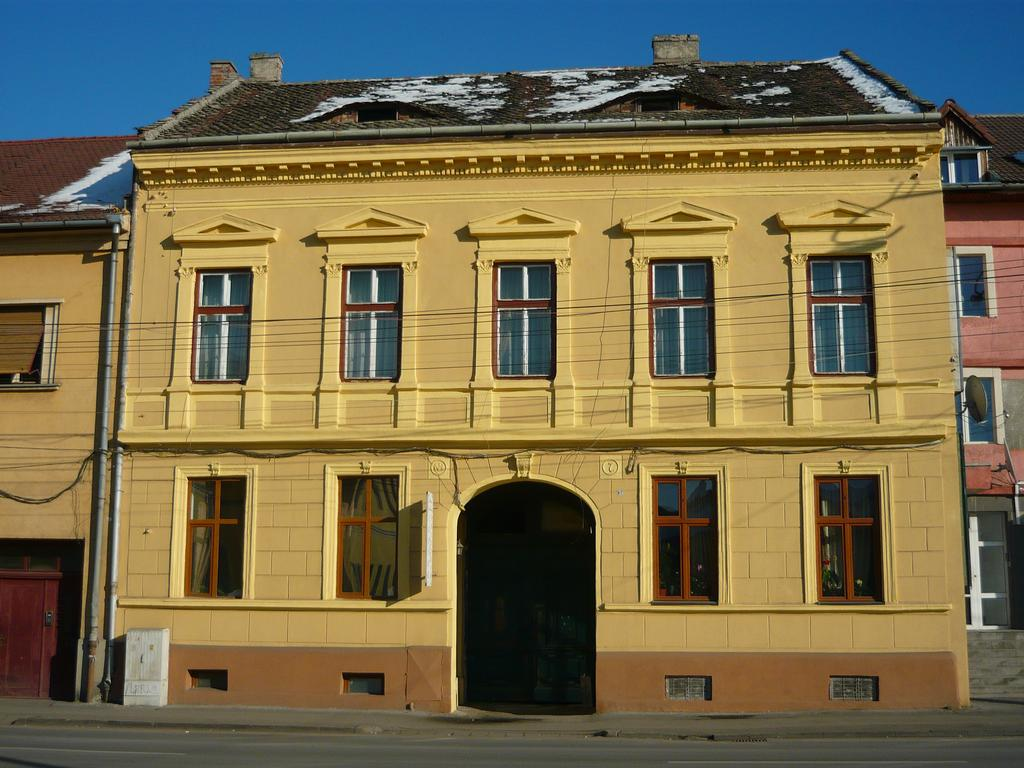
Neoclassical building with eyes (Sibiu)

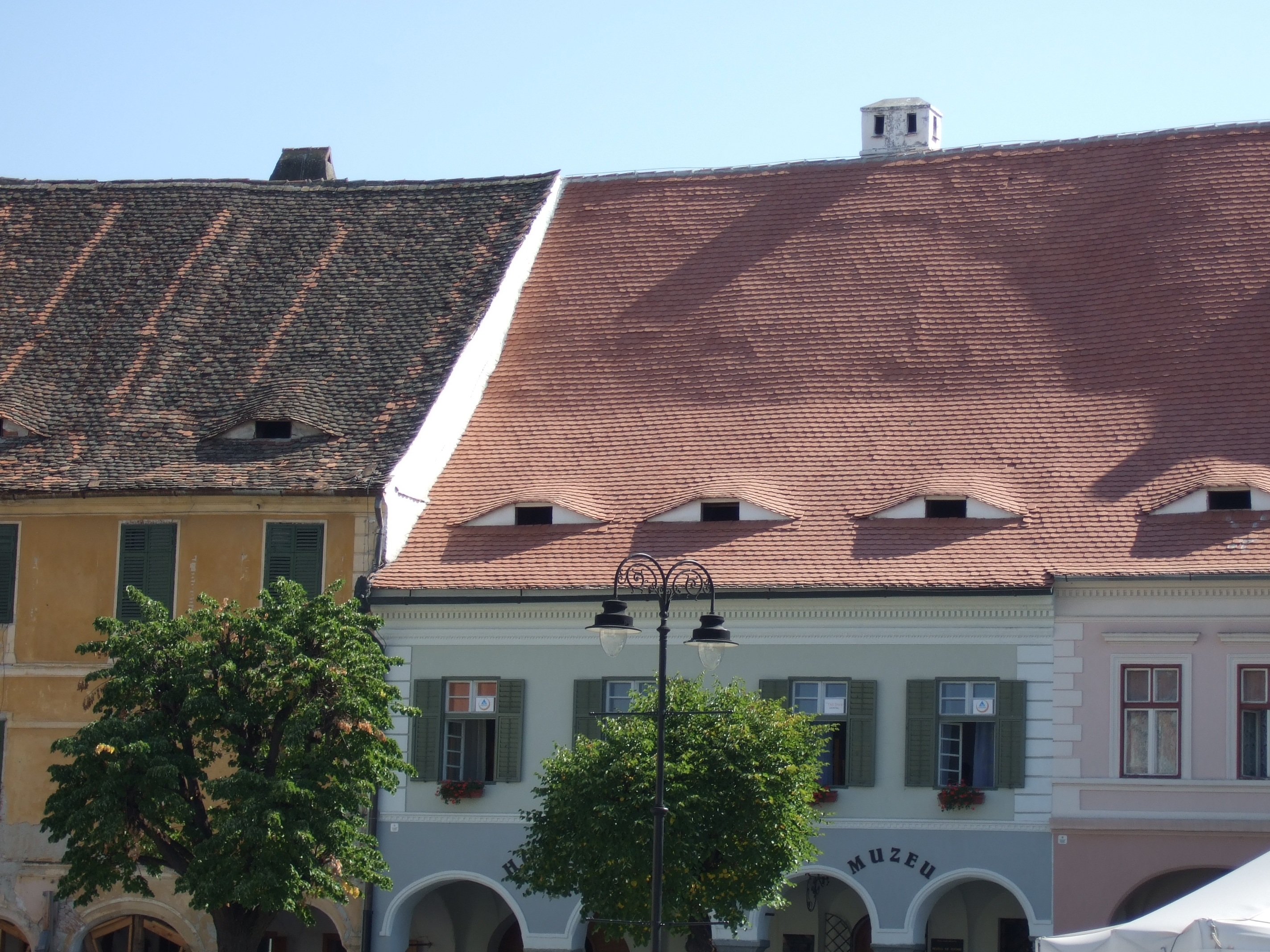
Houses in the Lesser Square

Lesser Square seen from the Council Tower (2024). The Lutheran cathedral is in the background.

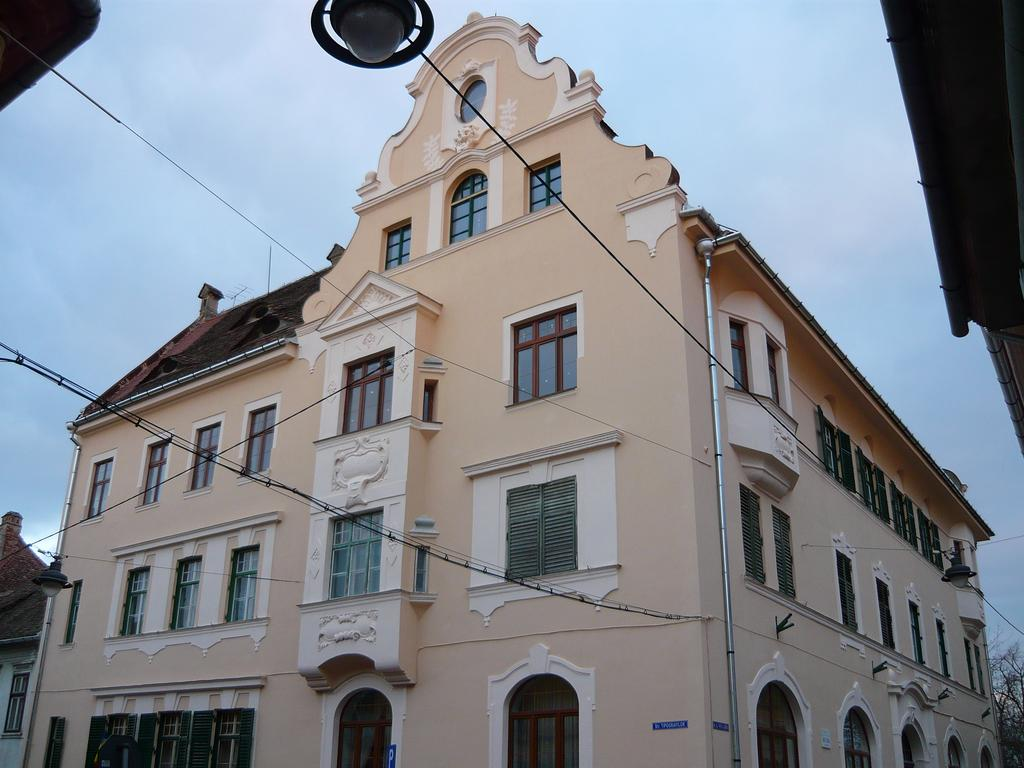
Art Nouveau house on Strada Cetății, Sibiu, with rounded eyes

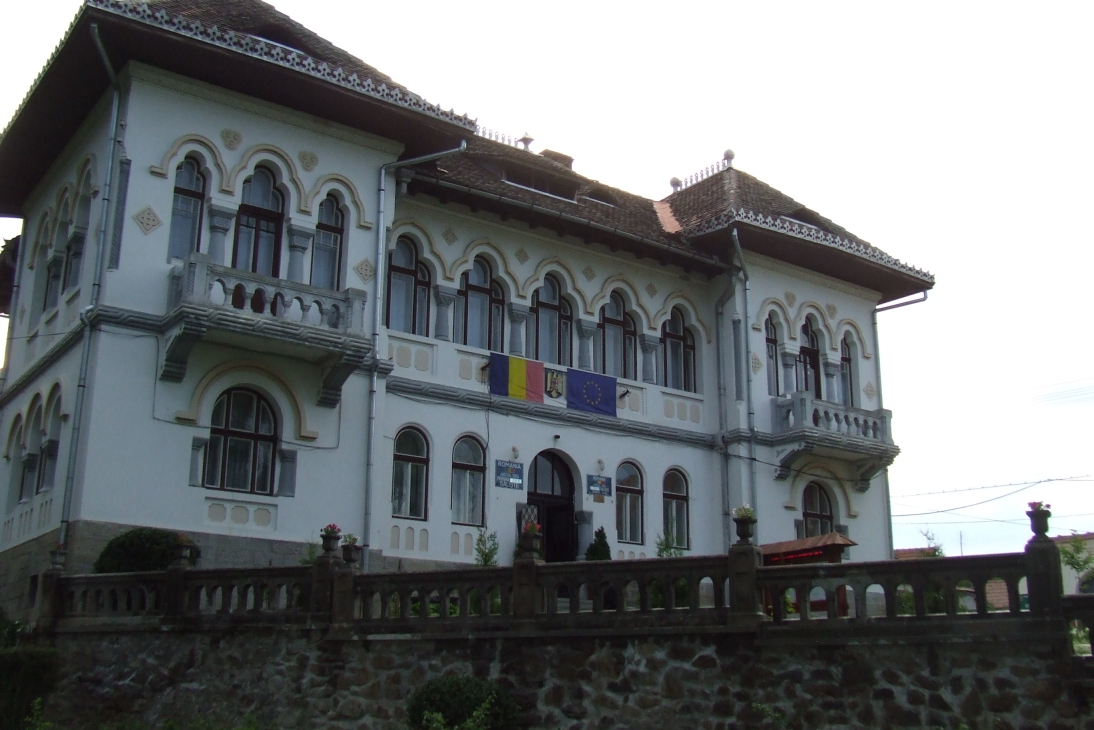
Eyes in Săliște. The building is Neo-Romanian, so it was most likely built in the 20th century, but has preserved the tradition of having eye-shaped roof windows.

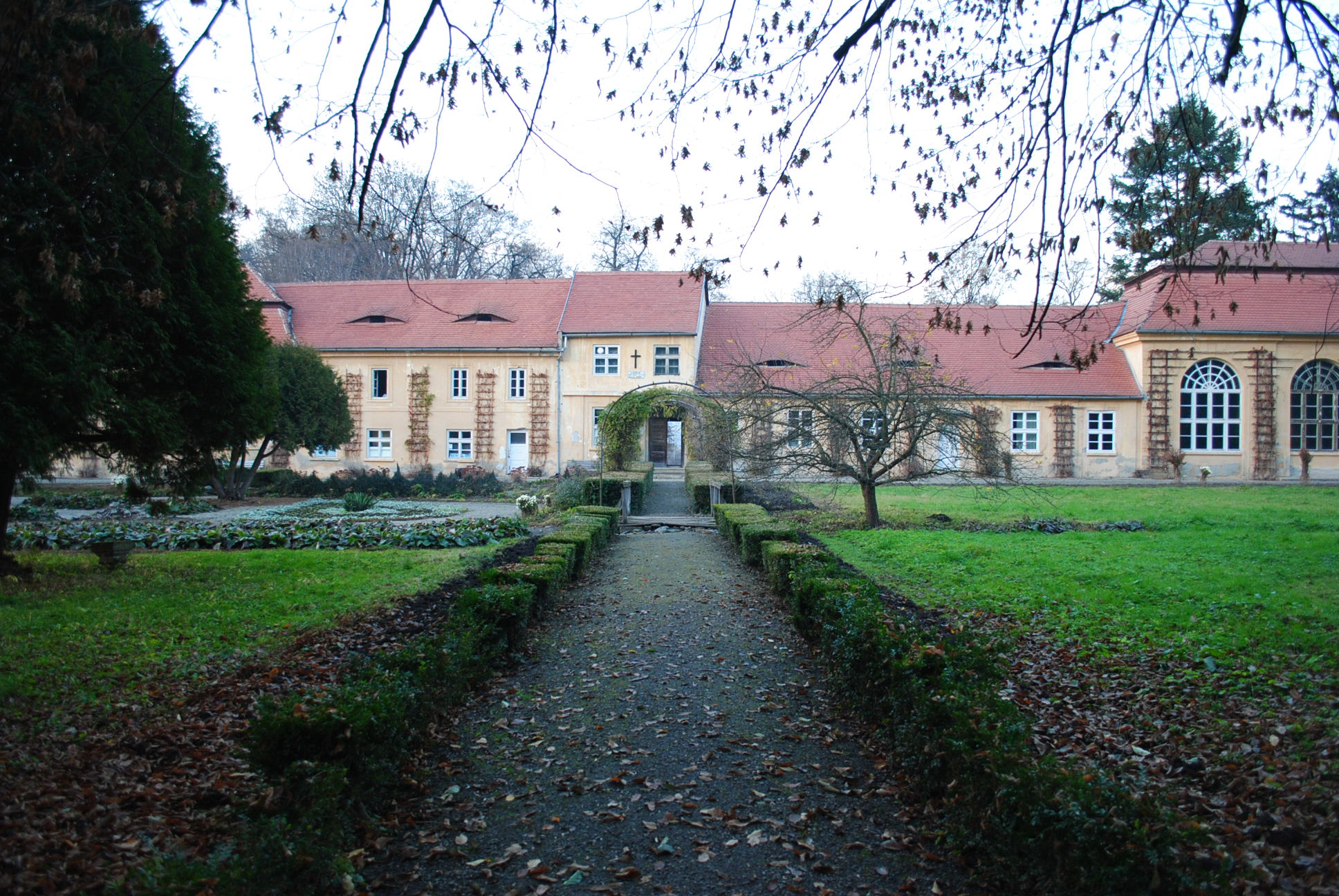
Brukenthal Castle in Avrig (Sibiu County)

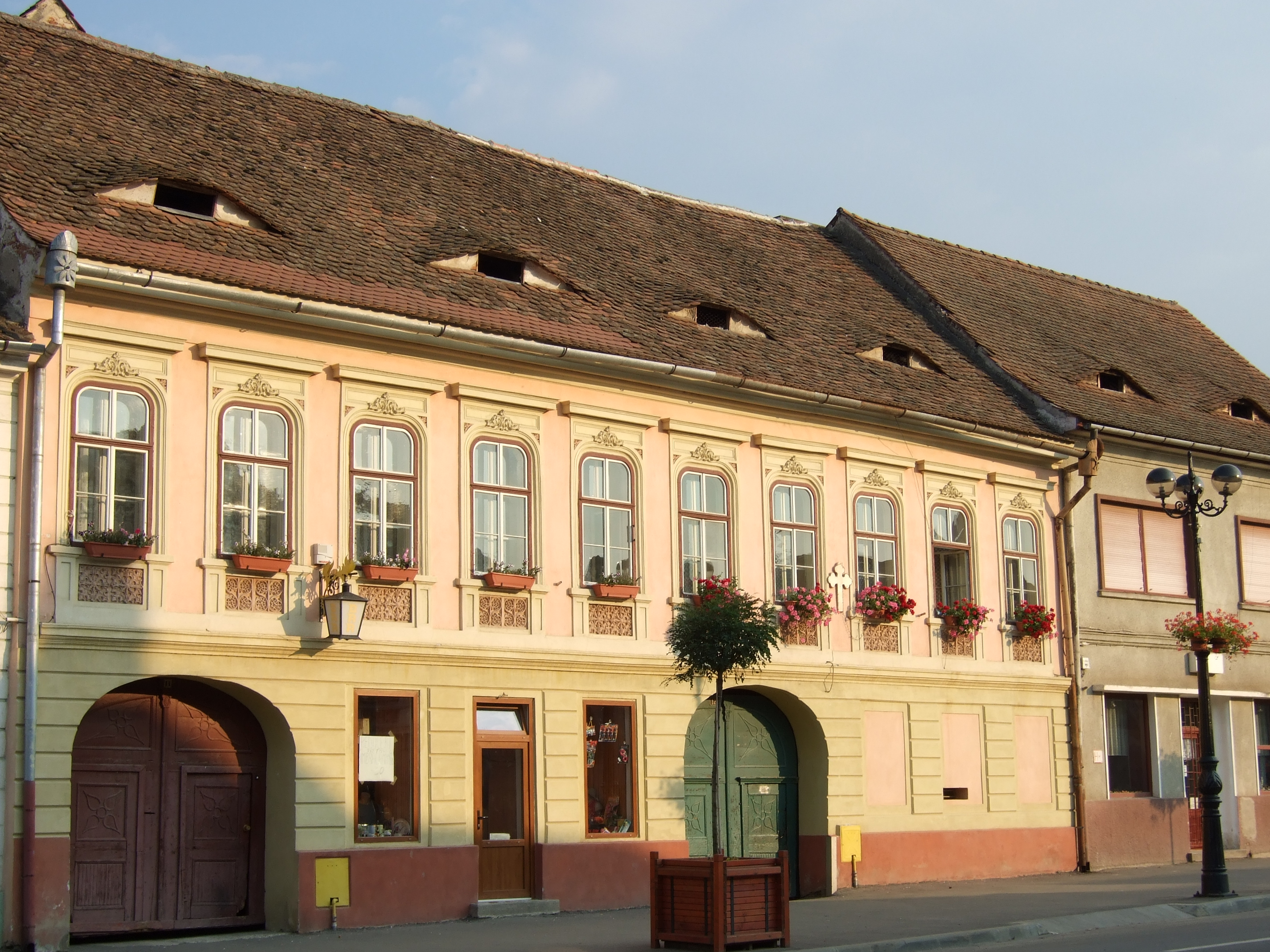
Cisnădie (Sibiu County)

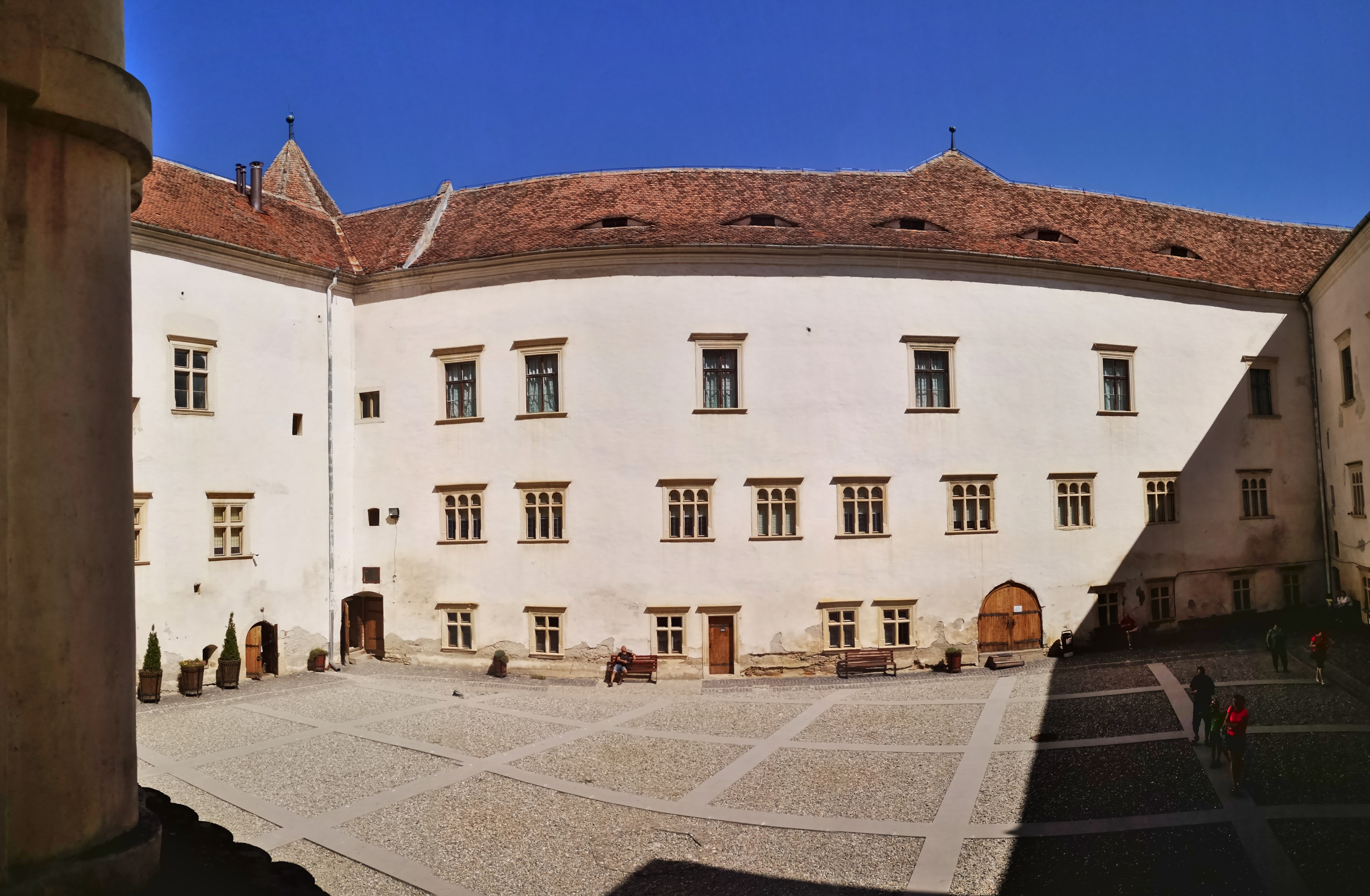
Interior of the Făgăraș Citadel (Brașov County)

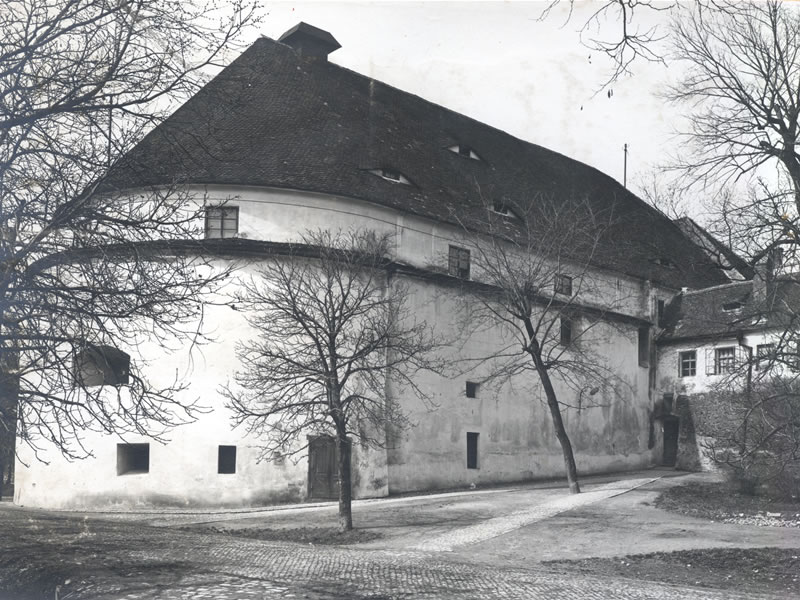
The old roof of the Thick Tower (Sibiu)

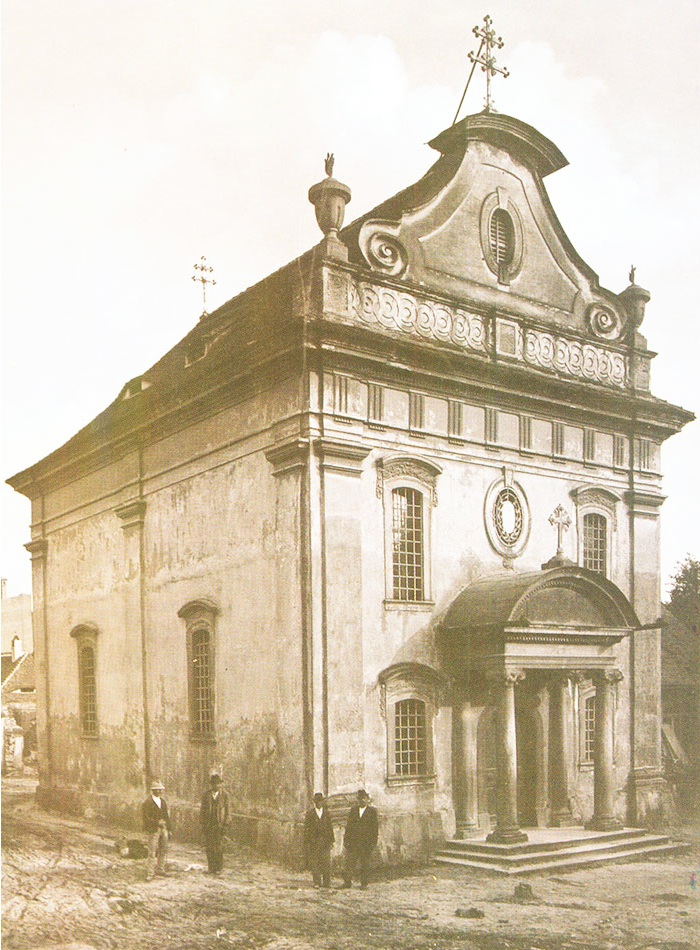
Eye on the old Orthodox cathedral (Sibiu)

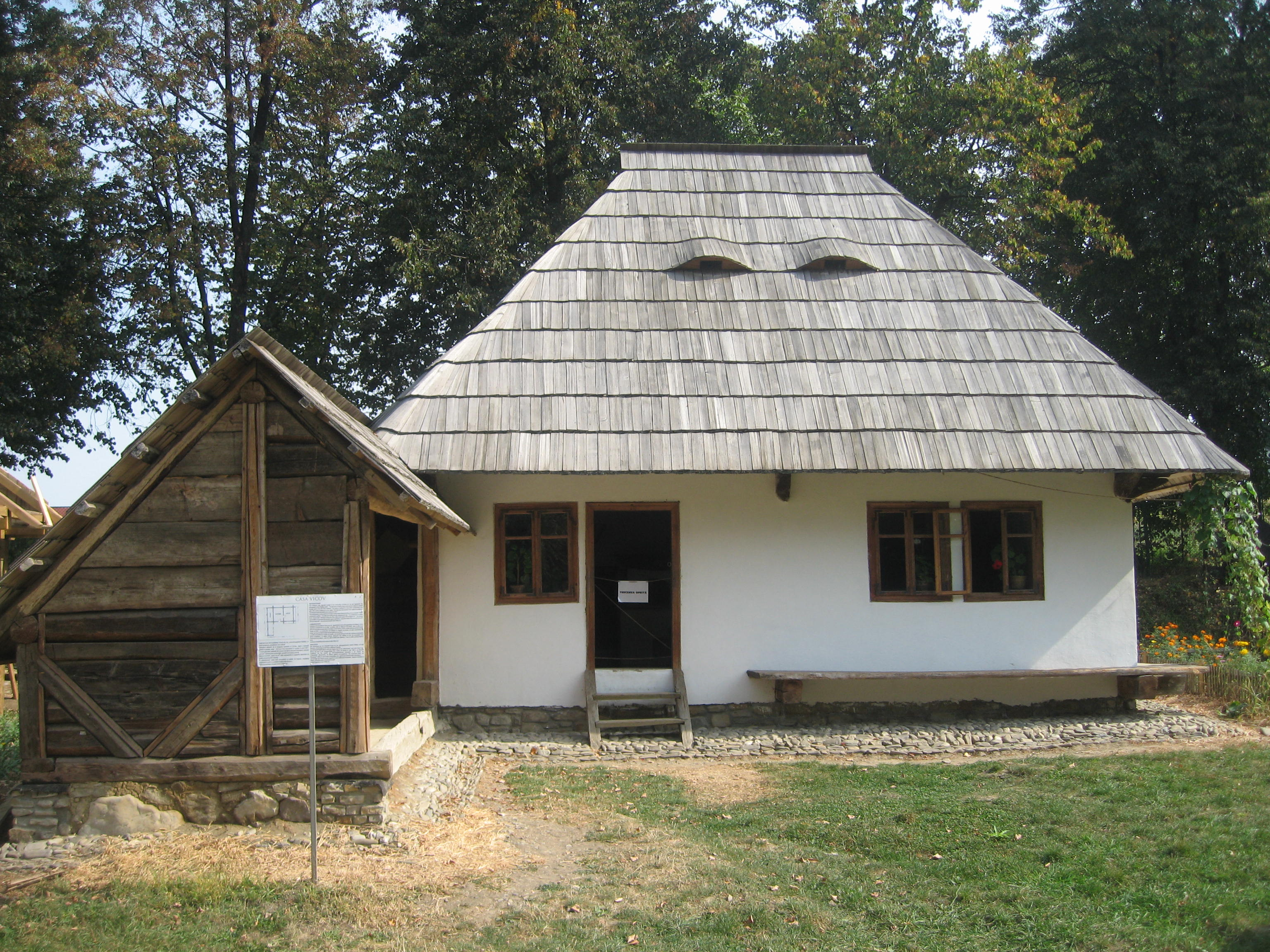
Traditional Romanian house from Vicovu de Jos at the Bukovina Village Museum in Suceava (also with eyes on its roof)

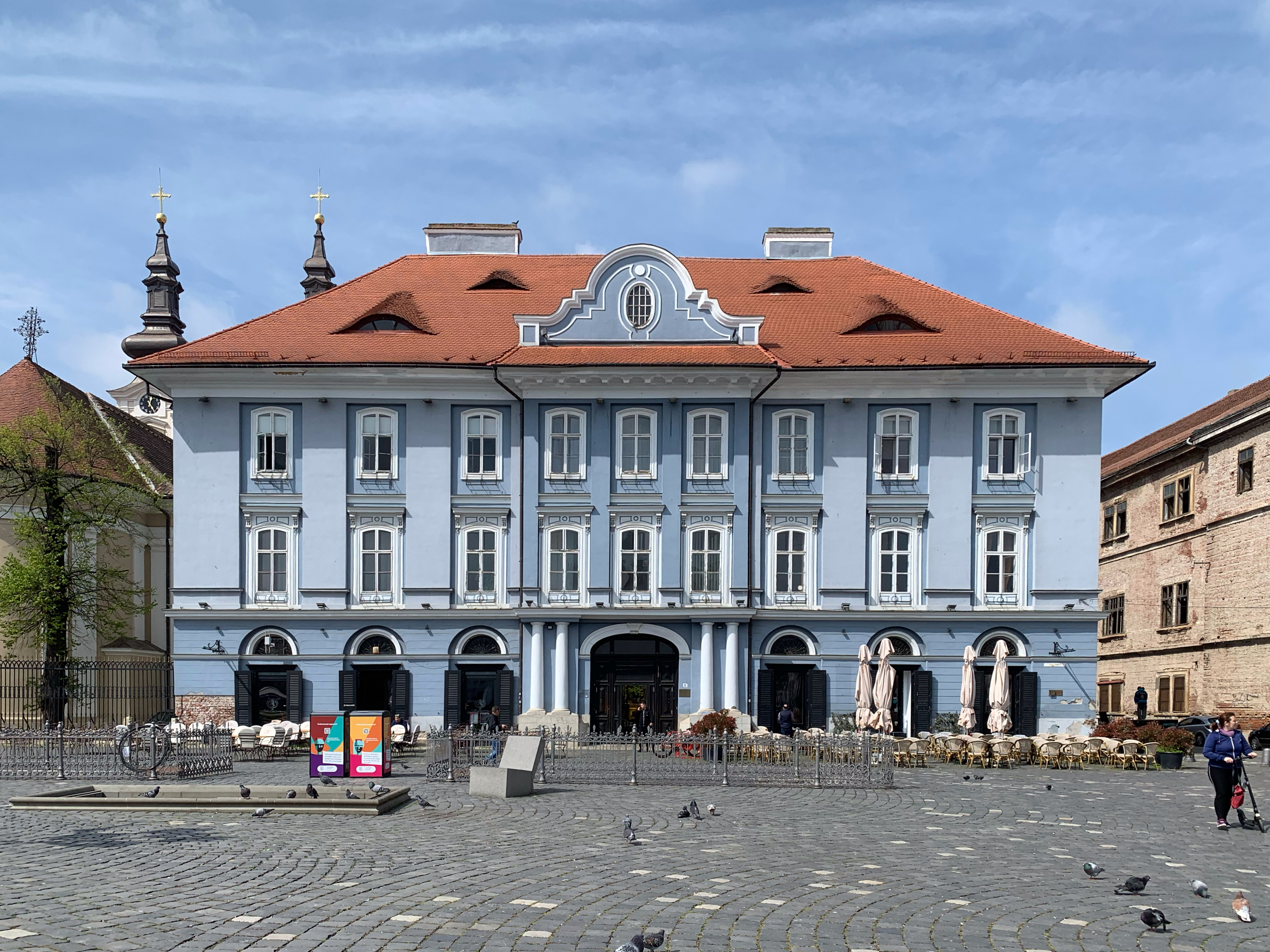
Serbian Community House, with eyebrow dormers in Timișoara

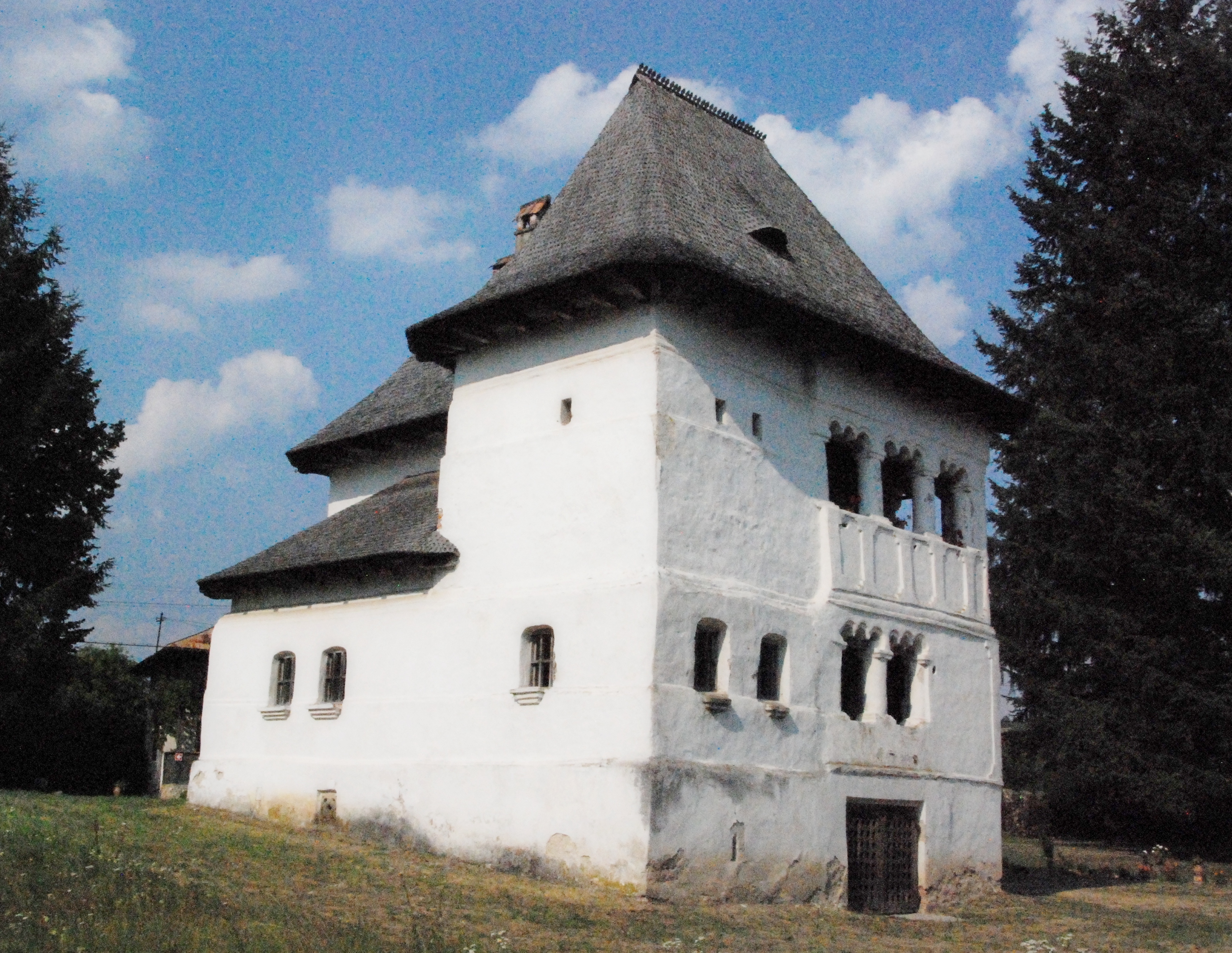
Culă from Oltenia with eyebrow dormers

== See also ==
- Council Tower of Sibiu
- Sibiu Lutheran Cathedral
- Pareidolia
