= Continental =

Continental may refer to:

== Places ==
- Continental, Arizona, a small community in Pima County, Arizona, US
- Continental, Ohio, a small town in Putnam County, US

== Arts and entertainment ==
- Continental (album), an album by Saint Etienne
- Continental (card game), a rummy-style card game
- Continental (film), a 2013 film
- Continental Singers, a Christian music organization

== Companies ==
- ContiGroup Companies or Continental Grain
- Continental AG, a German automotive parts and technologies manufacturer
- Continental Airlines, a former American airline
- Continental Electronics, an American radio transmitter manufacturer
- Continental Films, a German-controlled French film company during the Nazi occupation of France
- Continental Illinois, a defunct large bank
- Continental Mortgage and Loan Company (later known as Continental, Inc.), the former name of HomeStreet Bank
- Continental Motors, Inc., a Chinese manufacturer of aircraft engines
- Continental Oil Company, the original name for ConocoPhillips
- Continental Records, a former American record company
- Grupo Continental (Honduras), a group of companies in Honduras

=== Automobile ===
- Continental Automobile Company, a defunct American automobile manufacturer in Grand Rapids, Michigan (1933–1934)
- Continental Automobile Manufacturing Company, a defunct American automobile manufacturer in New Haven, Connecticut (1907–08)
- Continental Motor Car Company (Chicago), a defunct American automobile manufacturer in Chicago, Illinois (1907)
- Continental Motor Car Company (Springfield), a defunct American automobile manufacturer in Springfield, Illinois (1903)
- Continental Motors Company, a defunct American automobile engine manufacturer (1900s-1960s)
- Continental tire, a method of affixing a spare tire to many personal luxury vehicles

== Automobile models ==
- Bentley Continental, several generations of luxury automobiles since 1952
- Continental Mark Series, a series of popular personal luxury cars produced by the Lincoln Motor Company
- De Vaux Continental, by the Continental-De Vaux Company
- Lincoln Continental, a series of luxury cars by Lincoln
- Rolls-Royce Phantom II Continental, a version of the Rolls-Royce Phantom II

== Television stations ==
- Televisión Continental, a defunct Peruvian television station
- TV Continental, a defunct television station in Rio de Janeiro, Brazil

== Buildings ==
=== United States ===
- 333 South Wabash, formerly Continental Center III, Chicago, Illinois
- Continental and Commercial National Bank, Chicago, Illinois
- Continental Bank Building, New York City, New York
- Continental Bank Building (Salt Lake City), Utah
- Continental Building, Los Angeles, California
- Continental Center (Columbus, Ohio), Columbus, Ohio
- Continental Center (New York City), New York City, New York
- Continental Center 1, Houston, Texas
- Continental Center II, Houston, Texas
- Continental Life Building, St. Louis Missouri
- Continental Trust Company Building, Baltimore, Maryland
- Memorial Continental Hall, Washington DC
- Mercantile Continental Building, Dallas, Texas
- Metropolitan Tower, formerly Continental Center 1, Chicago, Illinois
- The Continental NYC, New York City, New York

=== Elsewhere ===
- Continental, a former name of the Gulliver, Kyiv, Ukraine
- Continental Engineering Corporation Tower, Taipei, Taiwan

== Other uses ==
- Continental, a group in the Sri Lankan grading system for cinnamon quills
- Continental (brand), a brand of foods used by Unilever in Australia
- Continental (currency), paper money issued by the US government during the American Revolution

== See also ==
- Continental Army, the unified command structure of the 13 colonies fighting Great Britain during the American Revolution
- Continental Can Company (1904–76), a United States metal container manufacturer
- Continental climate, the seasonal northern climates
- Continental Europe, the de facto land mass
- Continental cuisine or Continental cuisine, European/Western-style food/cuisine
- Continental glacier, wide spread mass of glacial ice
- Continental knitting, a method of left-hand knitting
- Continental philosophy, a 20th-century school of philosophy based mostly on texts by French and German philosophers
- Continental stitch or tent stitch, a needlepoint stitch worked on canvas
- Continental tire, an upright, external spare tire mounted behind an automobile's trunk compartment
- The Continental (disambiguation)
- Hotel Continental (disambiguation)
- Transcontinental (disambiguation)
- Intercontinental (disambiguation)
