= Panamericana Televisión Arequipa =

- Type: Relay station of Panamericana Televisión
- Country: Peru
- Broadcast area: Arequipa

Programming
- Picture format: 1080i HDTV

Ownership
- Owner: Panamericana Televisión Inversiones S.A.C.

History
- Founded: January 1959; 67 years ago
- Launched: August 15, 1959; 66 years ago
- Founder: Gustavo Quintanilla Paulet

Links
- Website: www.panamericana.pe

Availability

Terrestrial
- Analog VHF: Channel 2 (Arequipa)
- Digital VHF: Channel 2.1 (Arequipa)

Panamericana Televisión Arequipa is a relay station of Panamericana Televisión and the first television station outside of Lima. The station was founded in 1959 as Televisora Sur Peruana and, within a few years, was acquired by Panamericana.

== History ==
Televisora Sur Peruana was founded in 1959 by the National University of San Agustín (UNSA). Gustavo Quintanilla Paulet, a local Coca-Cola manager, gave impulse to the project. A closed-circuit test broadcast was done in January 1959 at the municipal theater, where television sets were installed in the street. Later, on August 15 at 7:30pm, the station started broadcasting, becoming the fourth in Peru overall (after Panamericana, América and TV Perú) and the first outside of Lima. Its launch was attended by president Manuel Prado Ugarteche and was presented by Gladys Zender, who won the Miss Universe 1957 pageant. Its early programs were conferences and academic dialogues from UNSA students, a news bulletin with static photos and a cooking show sponsored by a brand of olive oil. Later, the station started including live zarzuelas and telenovelas, the first telenovela being El secreto de Sor Teresa, directed by Alfredo Cano. The station had a commercial agreement with CBS, which provided it with American TV series, such as The Lone Ranger, I Love Lucy, Perry Mason, among others. It gained a competitor in 1962, Televisión Continental, on channel 6.

In 1966, the station, which had also gained offices in Tacna, Juliana and Cusco, was acquired by Panamericana Televisión, becoming a relayer of the Lima station, except for news bulletins. As of 1974, it had lost its ratings to the competitor, an América affiliate, due to the fact that Panamericana did not provide local programming. News programs from Lima came on a one-week delay.
