= Transcontinental =

Transcontinental may refer to:

- "Transcontinental", a song by the band Pedro the Lion from the album Achilles Heel
- Transcontinental (company), a Canadian printing, publishing, and marketing company
- The Transcontinental, a South Australian weekly newspaper
- Trans Continental Airlines, original name of Express.Net Airlines

== See also ==
- Continental (disambiguation)
- Intercontinental (disambiguation)
- Pluricontinentalism
