= Intercontinental =

Intercontinental is an adjective to describe something which relates to more than one continent.

Intercontinental may also refer to:

- Intercontinental ballistic missile, a long-range guided ballistic missile
- Intercontinental Broadcasting Corporation (IBC), Philippine broadcasting company
- InterContinental Hotels Group (IHG), a British multinational hospitality company
  - InterContinental, a hotel brand and subsidiary of IHG
- Intercontinental Cup (disambiguation), various sports competitions
- WWE Intercontinental Championship, an American-owned professional wrestling championship
- IWGP Intercontinental Championship, a Japanese-owned professional wrestling championship
- Intercontinental (horse) (born 2000), thoroughbred racehorse
- Intercontinental (album), a 1970 album by Joe Pass

== See also ==
- Pluricontinentalism
- Transcontinental (disambiguation)
- International (disambiguation)
- Multinational (disambiguation)
- Continental (disambiguation)
- Global (disambiguation)
