= Personal luxury car =

American car classification

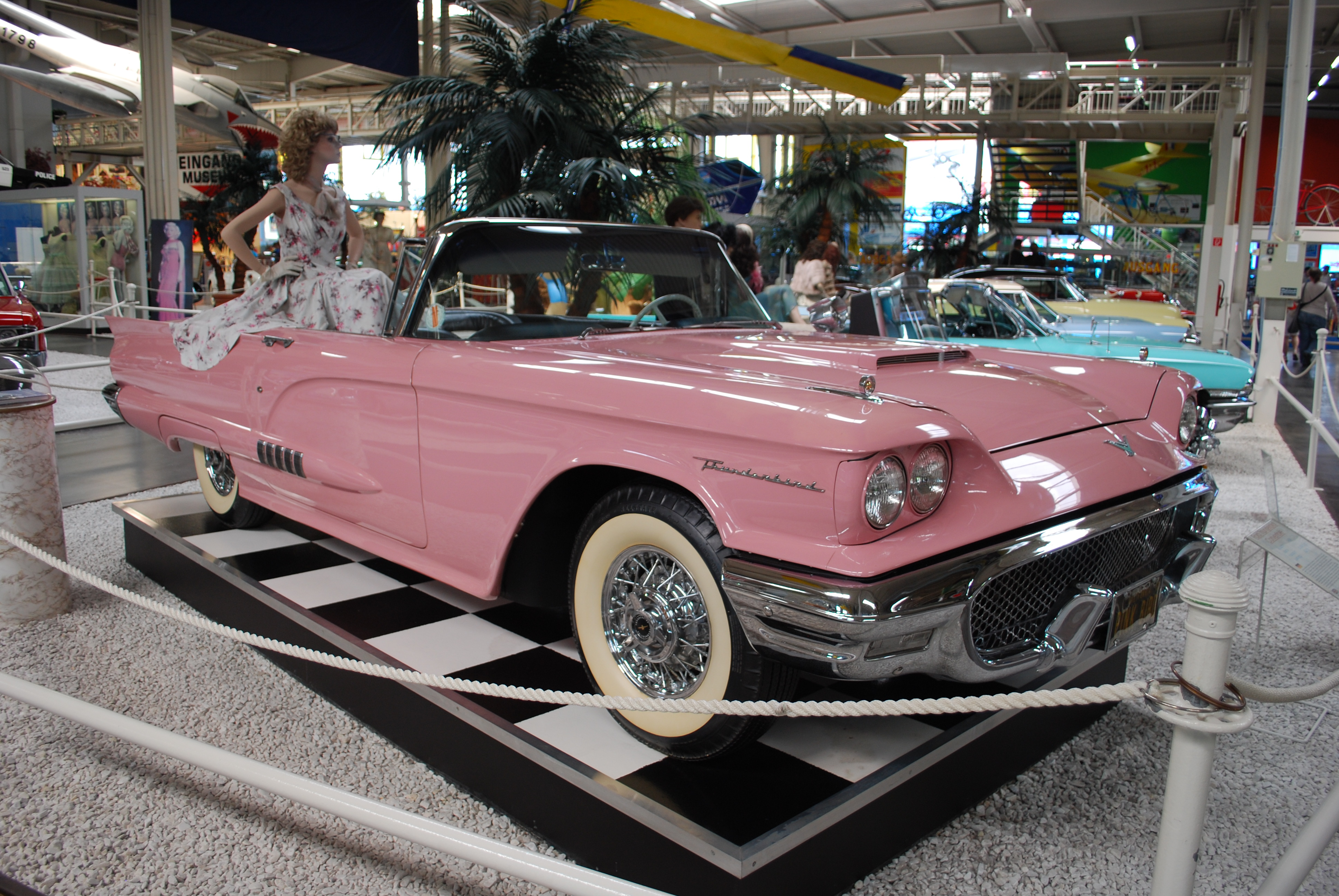
1958 Ford Thunderbird

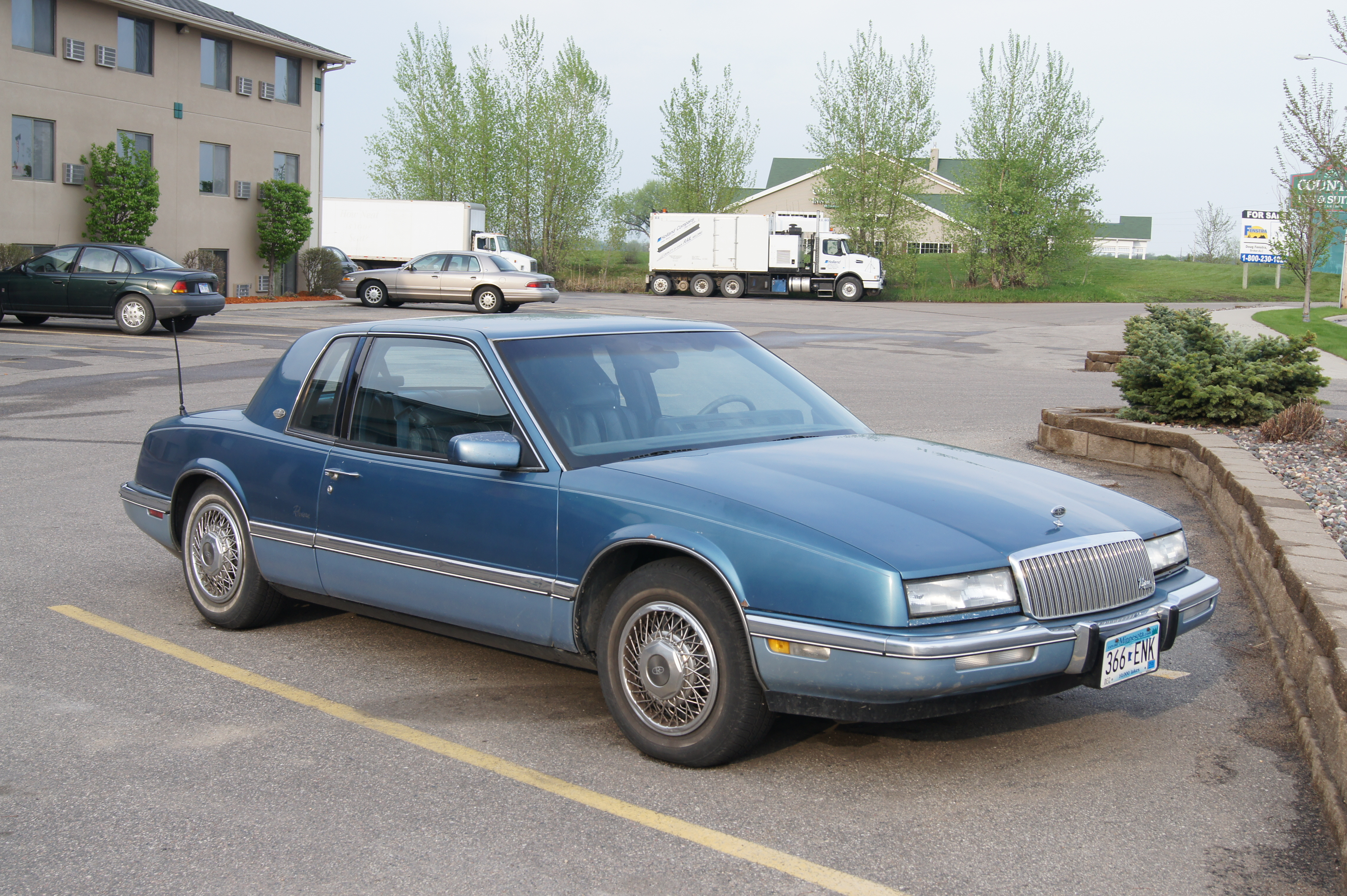
1989–1993 Buick Riviera

Personal luxury car is a North American car classification describing somewhat sporty, sophisticated mass-market coupés that emphasized comfort over performance. The North American manufacturers most often combined engineering, design, and marketing to develop upscale, distinctive "platform sharing" models that became highly profitable.

Although luxury coupes had been produced in North America for several decades, the beginning of the "personal luxury car" market segment is generally considered to have started in 1958. It was the success of the Ford Thunderbird (second generation) when it was redesigned from a two-seat car to a four-seat vehicle. These changes shifted the Thunderbird's emphasis from sporting to comfort and luxury, and sales increased by 50 percent. The Thunderbird was sold for eleven generations up until the 2005 model year.

The longest-running nameplate of the personal luxury car was the Cadillac Eldorado, which had a 50-year production run that began in the 1953 model year. Initially, it designated ultra-premium, low-volume versions of lower-priced Cadillac models, including the hand-built four-door 1957 Eldorado Brougham. According to Hemmings Motor News, Cadillac first entered the "personal luxury car" market in 1967, with a smaller high-volume model.

Before the late 1970s, personal luxury cars were typically large, rear-wheel-drive vehicles powered by large V8 engines. As a result of the downsizing trend in the American automotive industry during the late 1970s, many personal luxury cars were produced as mid-size cars with six-cylinder engines and front-wheel drive. By the 2000s, the personal luxury market had diminished as consumers migrated to other market segments.

== Characteristics ==
Personal luxury cars are mass-market vehicles that combine sports car and luxury car characteristics, typically featuring two-door coupés or convertibles with a small rear seat not intended for regular use by adults. Personal luxury car designs emphasize comfort and convenience, often highly equipped with interior features that were either optional or not available on other models.

In contrast to the European grand tourer sporty luxury car, where high-speed performance was key, the American personal luxury car typically blunted performance by mating large engines to heavy vehicles. The cars were usually mass-produced and often shared major mechanical components with other models from the manufacturer to reduce production costs.

== History ==
=== 1950s ===
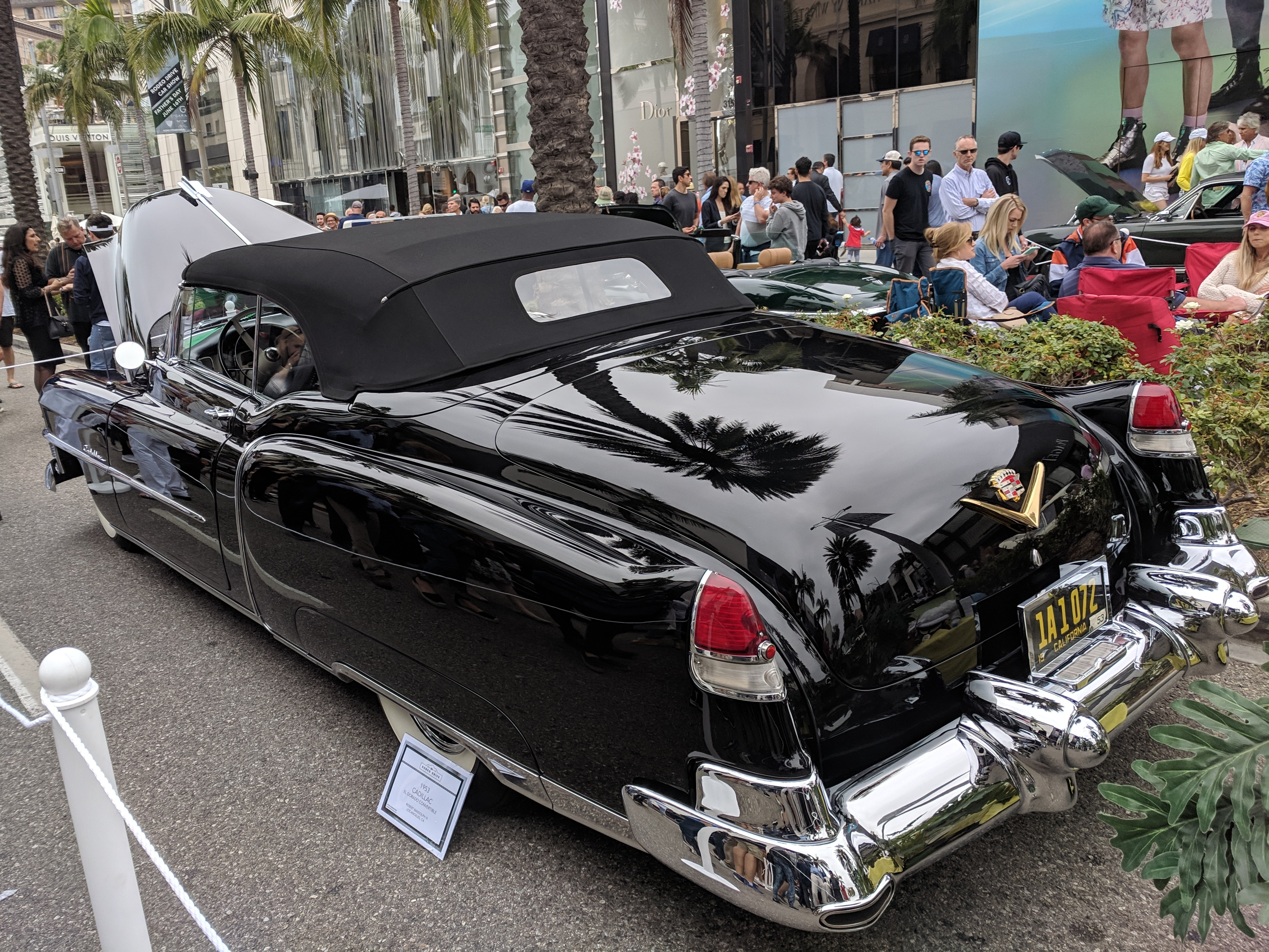
1953 Cadillac Eldorado

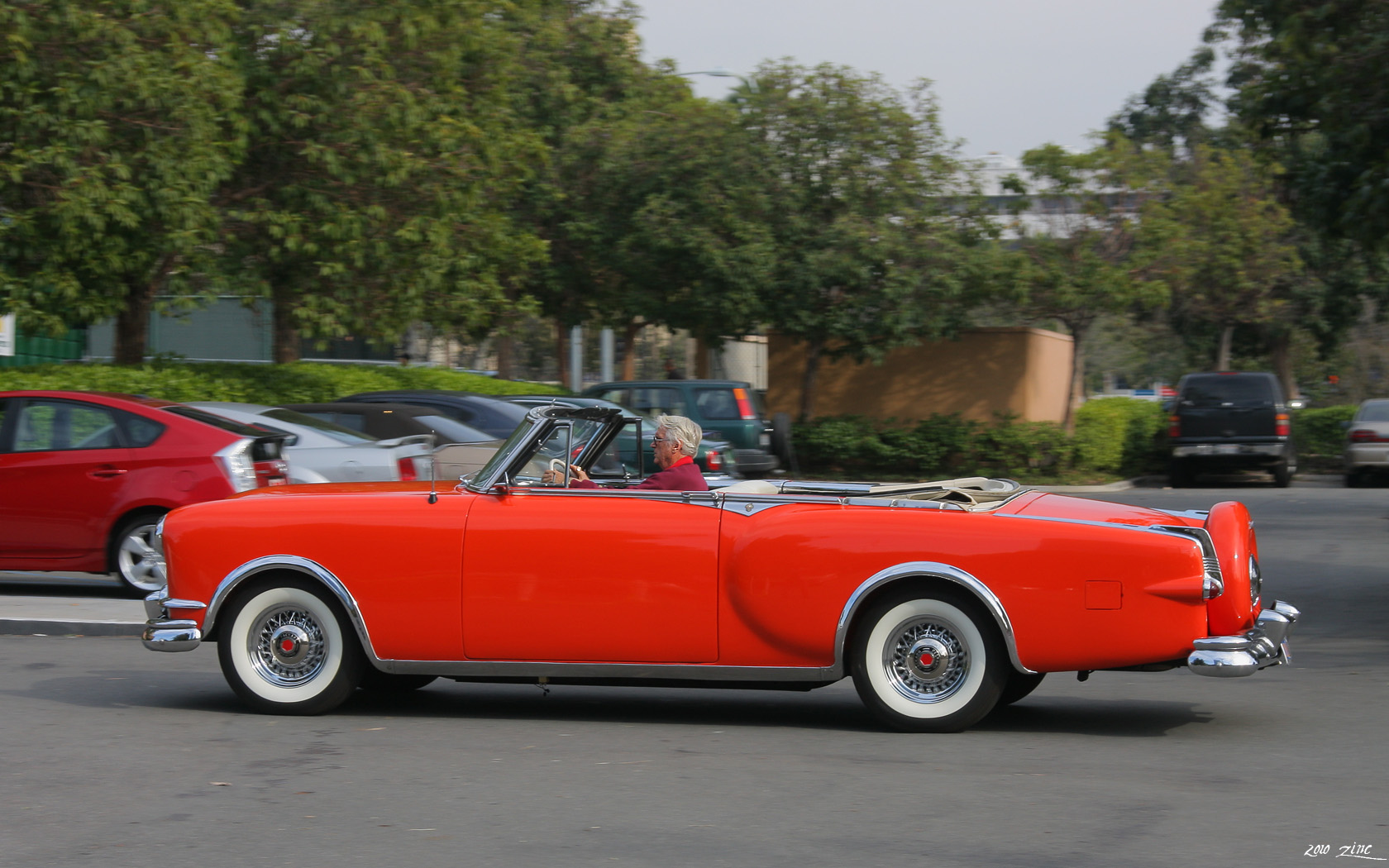
1953 Packard Caribbean convertible

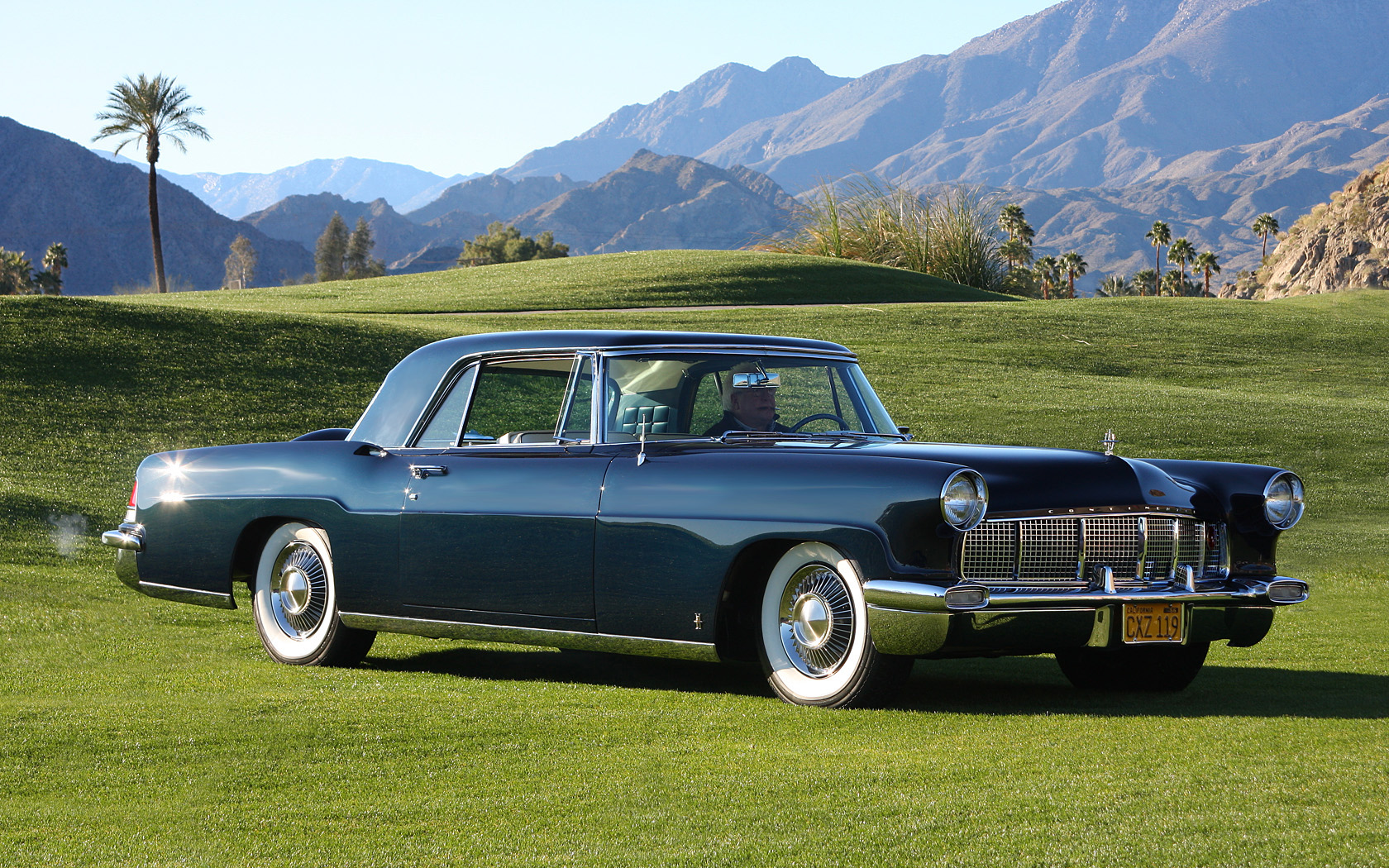
1956 Continental Mark II

==== Niche market ====
The initial luxury cars of this category during the 1950s in the United States were expensive, niche market, low-volume vehicles. Described as "quasi-custom" models, marketers at the time promoted them as "sports cars." This connoted "anything with a convertible top, lots of performance, a few unique styling touches, and a top-of-the-line price tag.

These included the Cadillac Eldorado, Buick Roadmaster Skylark, Oldsmobile 98 Fiesta, Imperial Newport, Chrysler New Yorker, Chrysler 300 and Chrysler Windsor, Packard Hawk, and Packard Caribbean. All models had two-door convertible or hardtop body styles, built on a platform shared with far less expensive models. The Eldorado represented 0.5% of Cadillac's total sales in 1953, with 1,690 Buick Skylarks, 458 Oldsmobile 98 Fiestas, and 750 Packard Caribbeans sold. The styling of 1950s luxury cars has been described as a "baroque excess".

An example is the Continental Mark II introduced for the 1956 model year. With a price of approximately US$10,000 (equivalent to $118,421 in 2025), the cost was comparable to a Rolls-Royce Silver Cloud, and 3,012 Mark IIs were sold from 1955 until 1957. It was produced in the two-door hardtop body style with extensive standard equipment for the time that included power steering, power brakes, power windows, power seats, power vent windows, leather interior, and a tachometer. The only option was air conditioning for $595.

==== Mass market ====
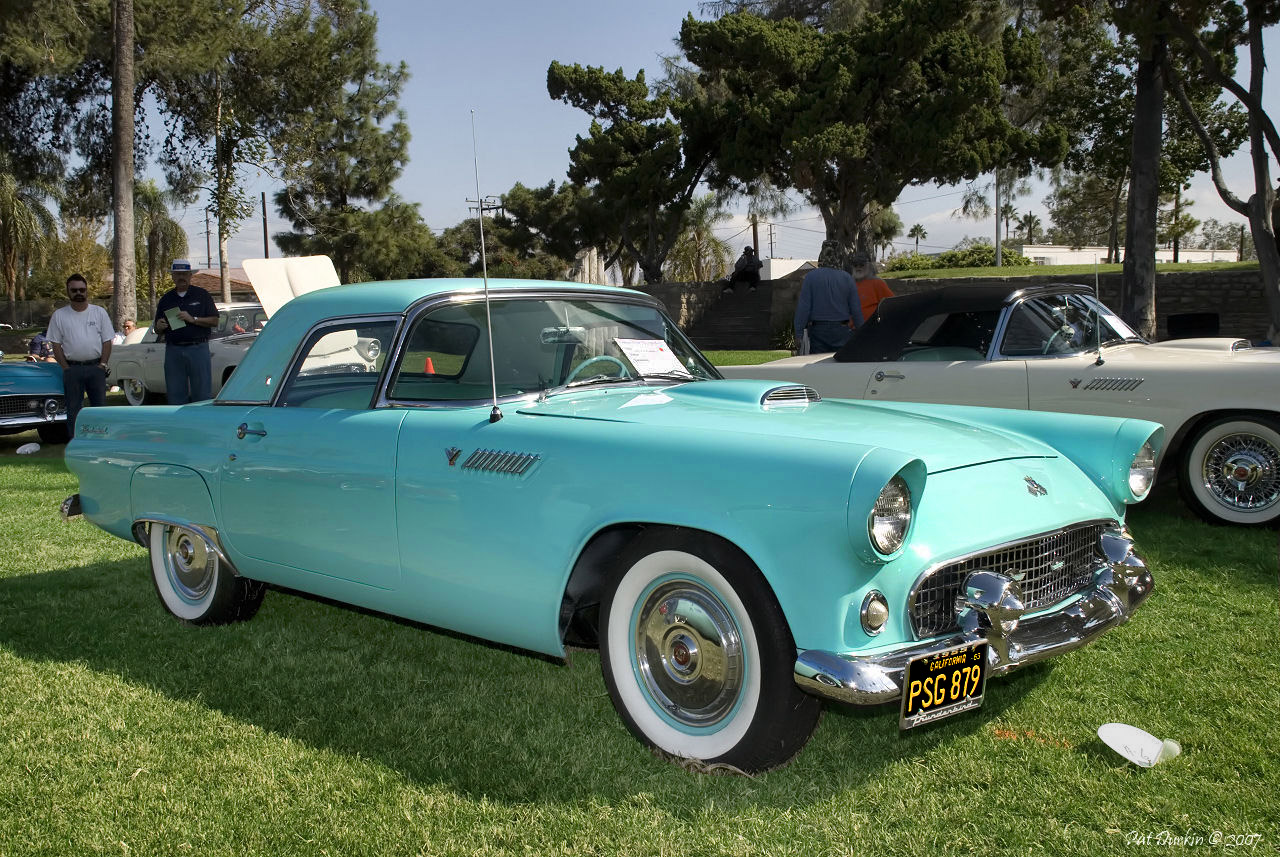
1955 Ford Thunderbird

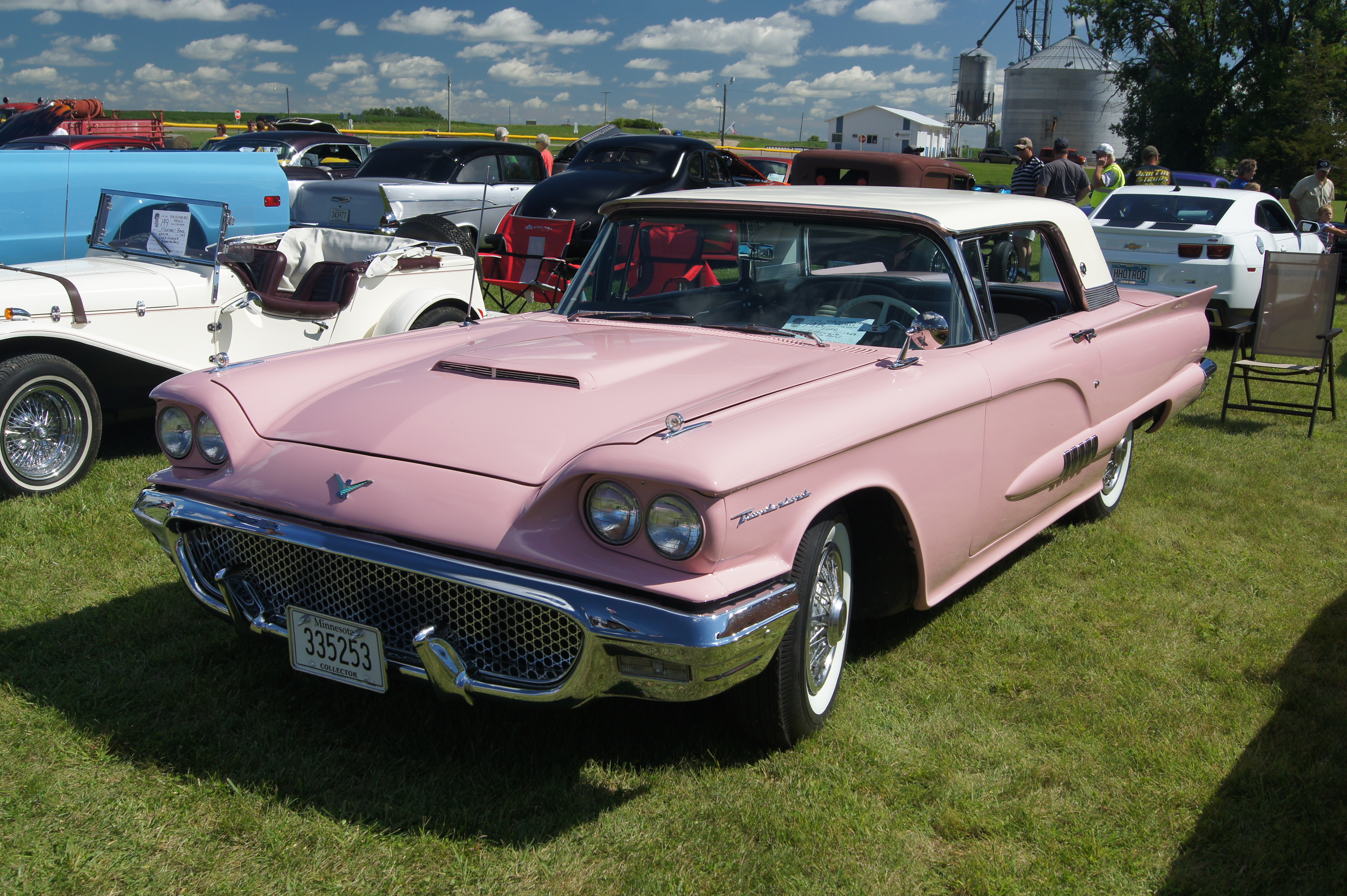
1958 Ford Thunderbird

The Ford Thunderbird, released in 1955, was marketed as a personal car and is often credited with playing a key role in the creation of the personal luxury car segment.

In the early 1950s, both Ford and General Motors were developing competitors to address what they perceived as the growing popularity of the European sports car niche in the North American market. The result was the Ford Thunderbird, Studebaker Speedster, and the Chevrolet Corvette.

The first-generation Thunderbird was a two-seat car with a V8 engine, a suspension designed for comfort instead of handling, and available in either convertible (folding soft-top) or roadster (removable hardtop) body styles. The Thunderbird was able to reach a top speed of 200 km/h (124 mph), which is similar to many European grand tourers of the era. The Thunderbird's sporty luxury format, with more features, proved vastly more popular with American car buyers than the spartan Corvette sports car by selling 16,155 units in 1955, compared with 674 Corvettes, 809 Chrysler 300D, and 2,200 Studebaker Speedsters. This market signal set the stage for further development.

The 1958 Ford Thunderbird became the first volume personal luxury car. The redesign added a rear seat in response to Ford's market research that the two-seat layout of the first generation was limiting sales. The convertible/roadster body style was replaced by two models, a fixed hardtop and convertible. Sales totaled 198,191 over three model years, approximately four times that of the earlier two-seat model. The Thunderbird received the 1958 Motor Trend Car of the Year award.

=== 1960s ===
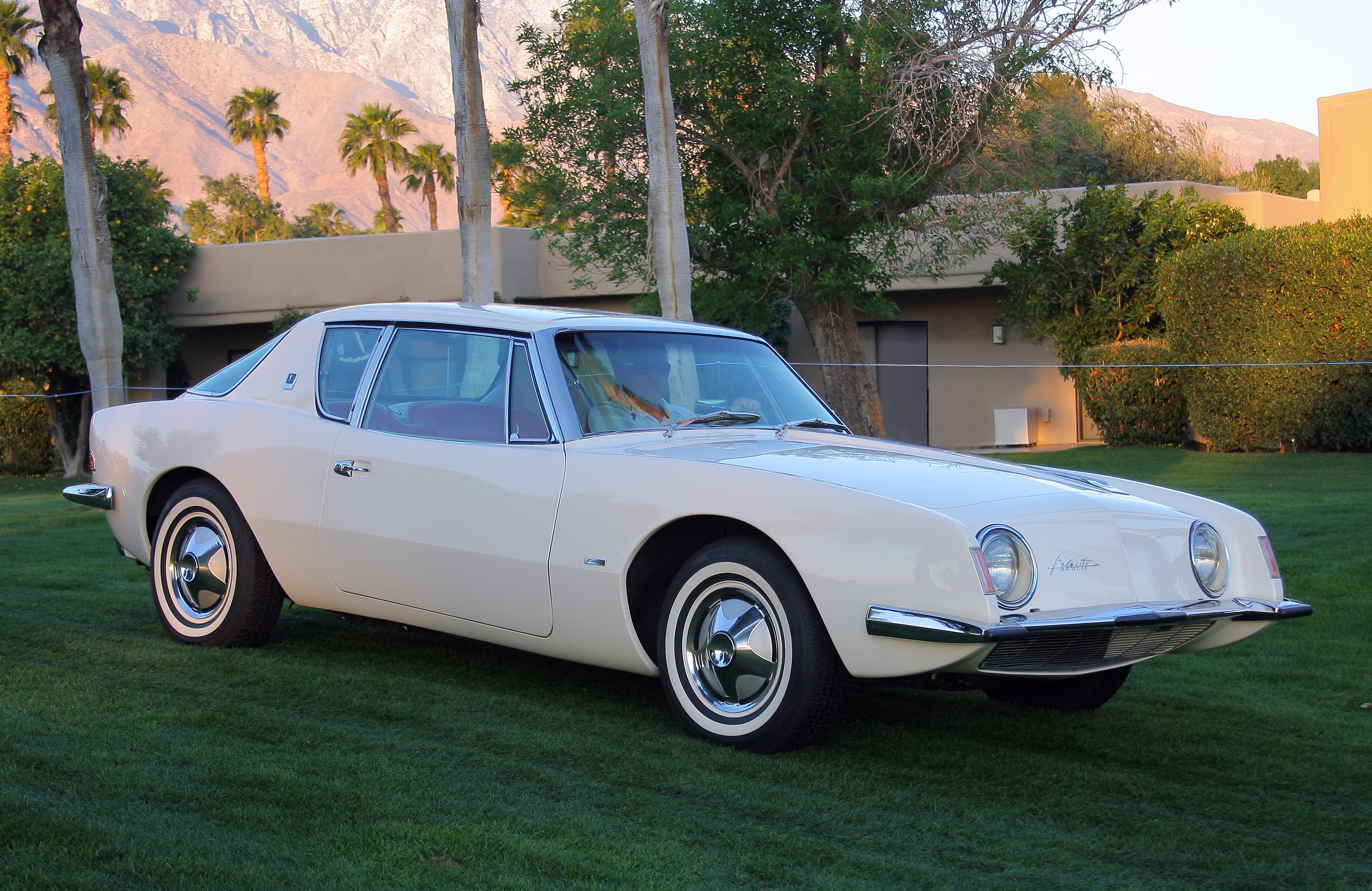
1963 Studebaker Avanti

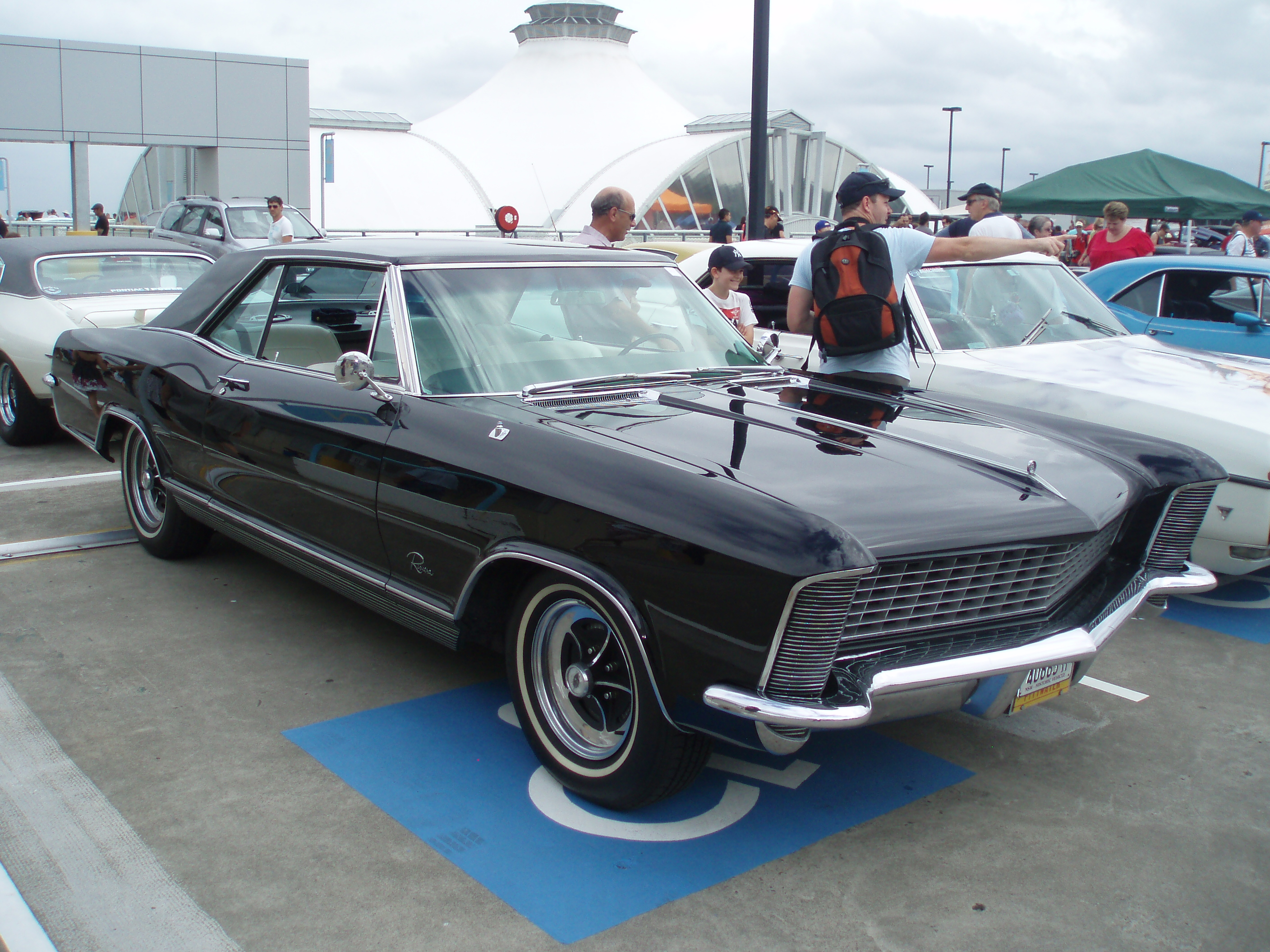
1965 Buick Riviera

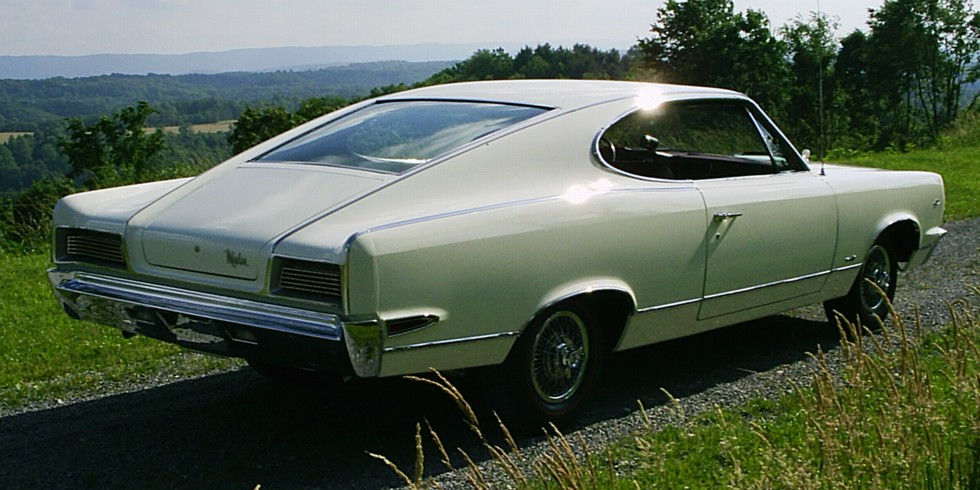
1967 AMC Marlin

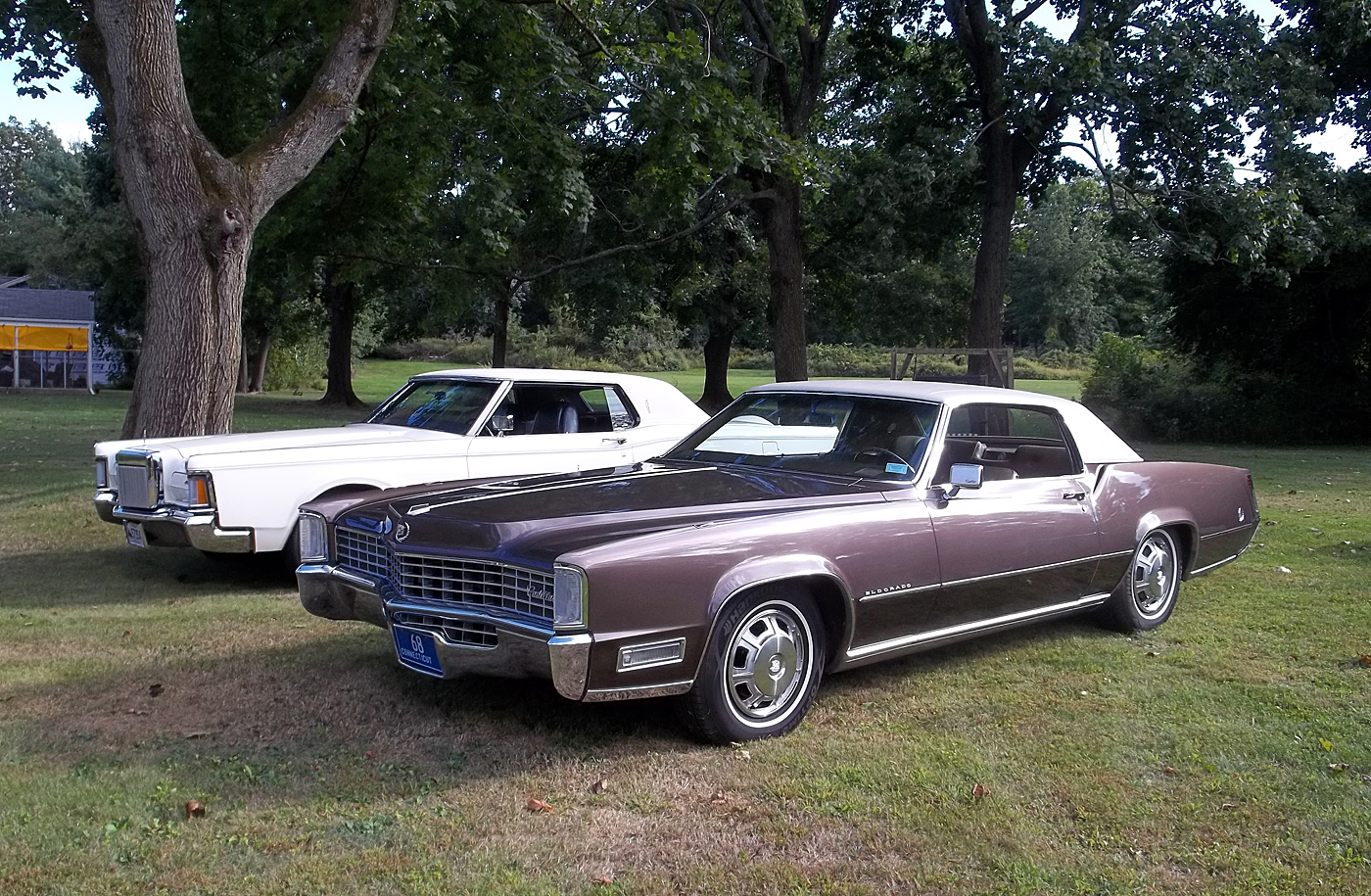
1968 Cadillac Eldorado (foreground) and 1971 Continental Mark III

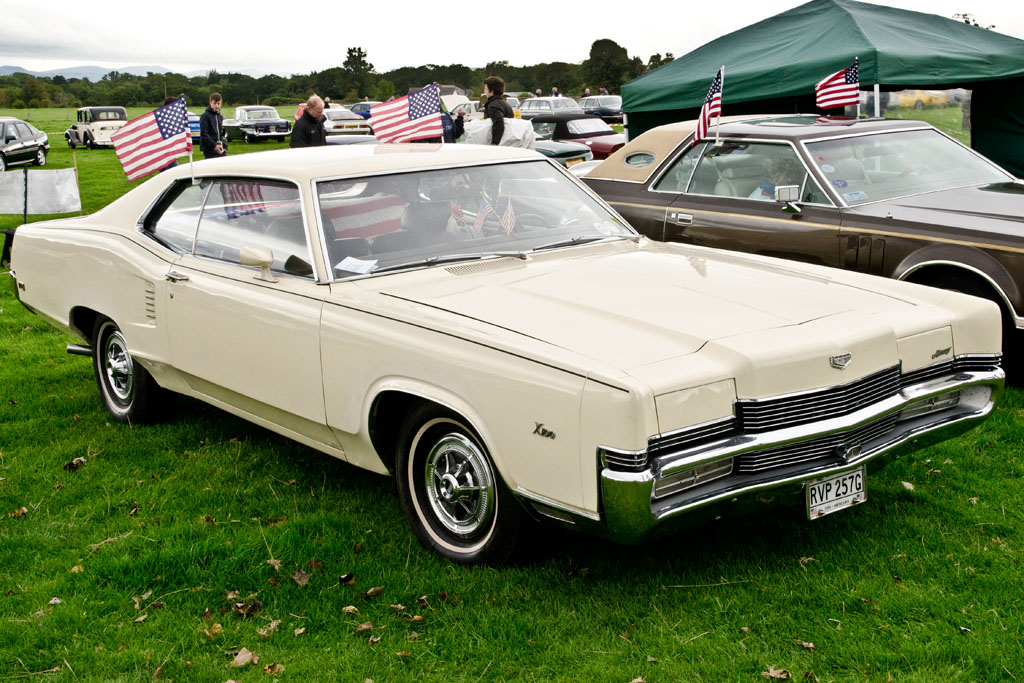
1969 Mercury Marauder

Two competitors inspired by the continued marketplace success of the four-seat Thunderbird appeared for model year 1963, both shown at the October 1962 Paris Motor Show. Both followed the close coupled four-seater coupe with powerful engine formula, laid down by the 1958 Thunderbird.

The first was the Studebaker Avanti. The Avanti featured a fiberglass body, an optional supercharged engine, and front disc brakes. It was marketed as "America's only four-passenger high-performance personal car". The company built 4,647 Avantis before Studebaker ended Avanti Production for the 1964 model year.

The second was the 1963 Buick Riviera, which began life as the Cadillac LaSalle XP-715 concept car. However, General Motors management was not interested in the XP-715 concept for Cadillac and offered it up to a competition between interested divisions. Buick won based on its marketing presentation. Total sales for the 1963–1965 model years were 112,244.

American Motors' first personal luxury car was the intermediate-sized 1965 Rambler Marlin. The Marlin was described as "unusual, distinctive and in a class by itself". Its design feature is the fastback roofline that terminates at the rear bumper. It was renamed as the AMC Marlin for 1966 to focus it on the personal luxury market.

The Dodge Charger was introduced in 1966 and is similar in size to the AMC Marlin. The models like the Charger were still classified as "specialty cars" as they were not muscle cars but included premium trim and special features.

The 1966 Oldsmobile Toronado became the first front-wheel drive personal luxury car. The Toronado provided the platform for the Cadillac Eldorado (eighth generation) to switch to a smaller sized, high-volume front-wheel drive layout the following year.

Up until 1967, personal luxury cars were grouped with muscle cars and pony cars as the "specialty cars" classification. Rather than marketing to broad income classes as with their standard models, each of these car classes was targeted by the automakers to smaller and more specific market niches while offering long lists of options to satisfy consumer demands for individuality.

For 1967, the AMC Marlin was increased in size but still considered an intermediate, a "larger 3+3 family coupe designed to appeal to the market's trend toward bigger cars with more appointments." Also for 1967, the Ford Thunderbird (fifth generation) was released, moving further upmarket and with a four-door pillarless hardtop body style being added.

The Continental Mark III two-door coupe was introduced for the 1969 model year as the flagship vehicle of Ford Motor Company and as a successor to the 1956 and 1957 Continental Mark II. The Mark III was based on the chassis of the Ford Thunderbird (fifth generation) to lower development costs. Styling features of the Mark III included hidden headlamps (with retractable body-colored covers), a Rolls-Royce-style grille, and a simulated spare tire on the trunk lid. The Mark III was the first American-made vehicle with radial tires as standard equipment.

In what would become a three-decade rivalry, the 1969 model year Mark III sold 30,858 cars for the extended 1969 model year (although 7,770 were built in 1968), while Eldorado sold 23,333 units that year.

The Mercury Marauder (second generation) was available for 1969 and 1970 as its model line of personal luxury cars in base and X-100 trim. The Marauder utilized Ford's redesigned XL hardtop's wheelbase that was 3-inch (76 mm) shorter than other full-sized Mercury models and included a 429 cu in (7.0 L) V8 engine. It featured hidden headlamps, a flying buttress-style roofline with available matte-black rear and trunk lid finish, rear fender skirts as well as five-spoke aluminum wheels with white wall bias-ply tires.

Additionally, for the 1969 model year, the Pontiac Grand Prix (third generation) was downsized from a full-size to a mid-size coupe in an attempt to reverse the declining sales of the Grand Prix model. Smaller than the Cadillac Eldorado and Oldsmobile Toronado, it was nimbler and more performance-oriented than the Ford Thunderbird and Buick Riviera. Sales reached over 112,000 units, almost quadruple the 32,000 full-sized models built in 1968.

=== 1970s ===
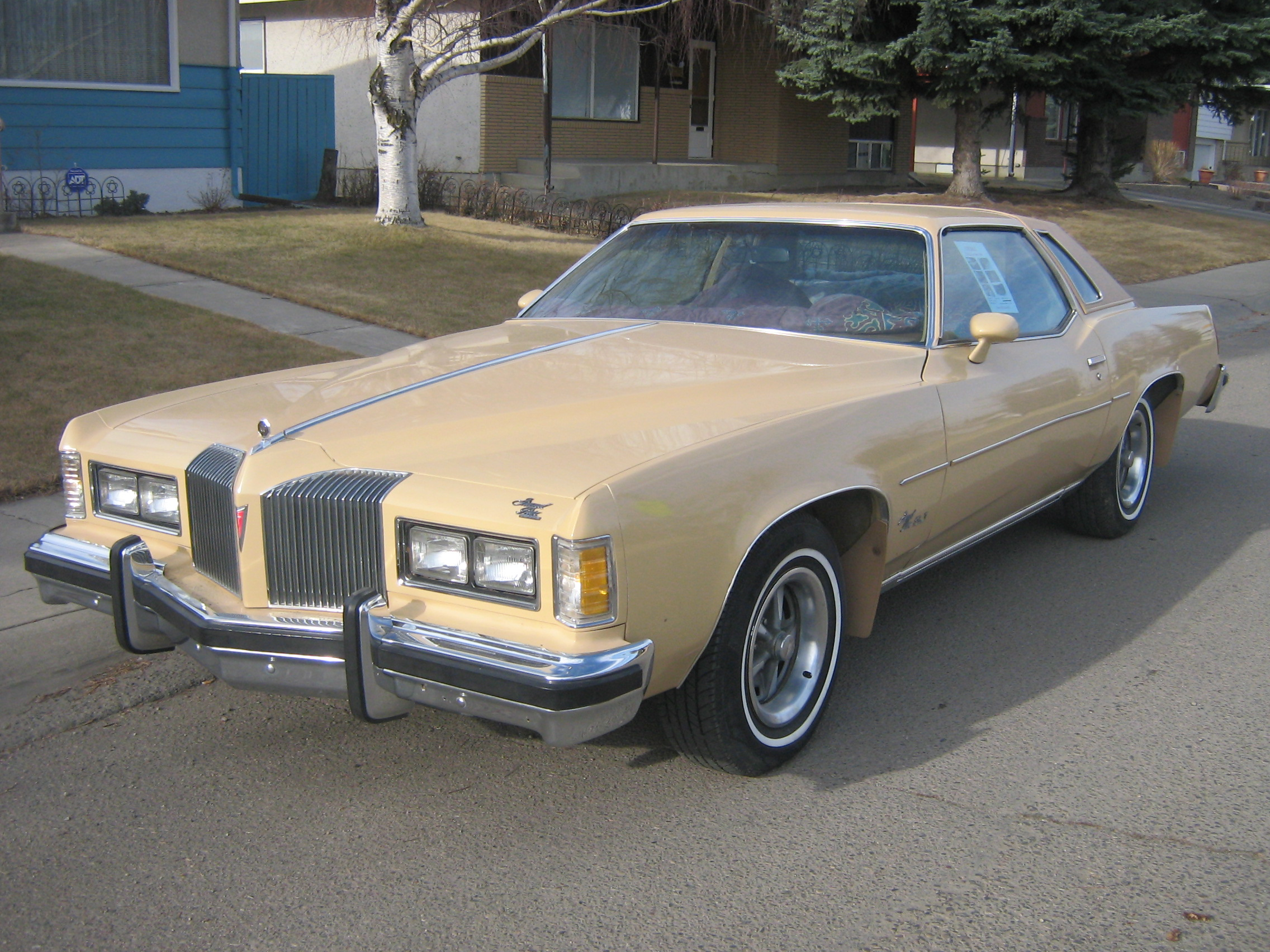
1976 Pontiac Grand Prix

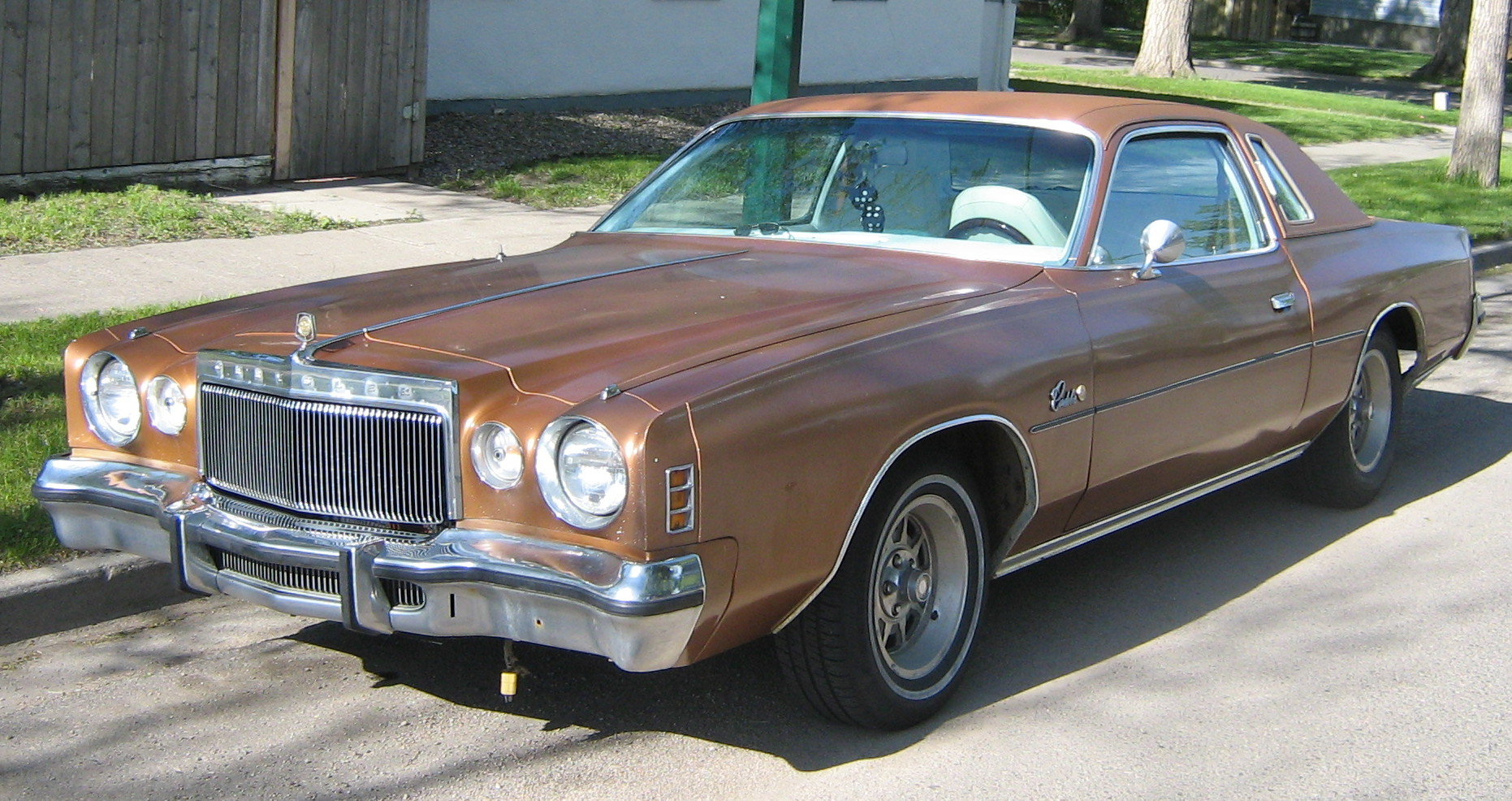
1976 Chrysler Cordoba

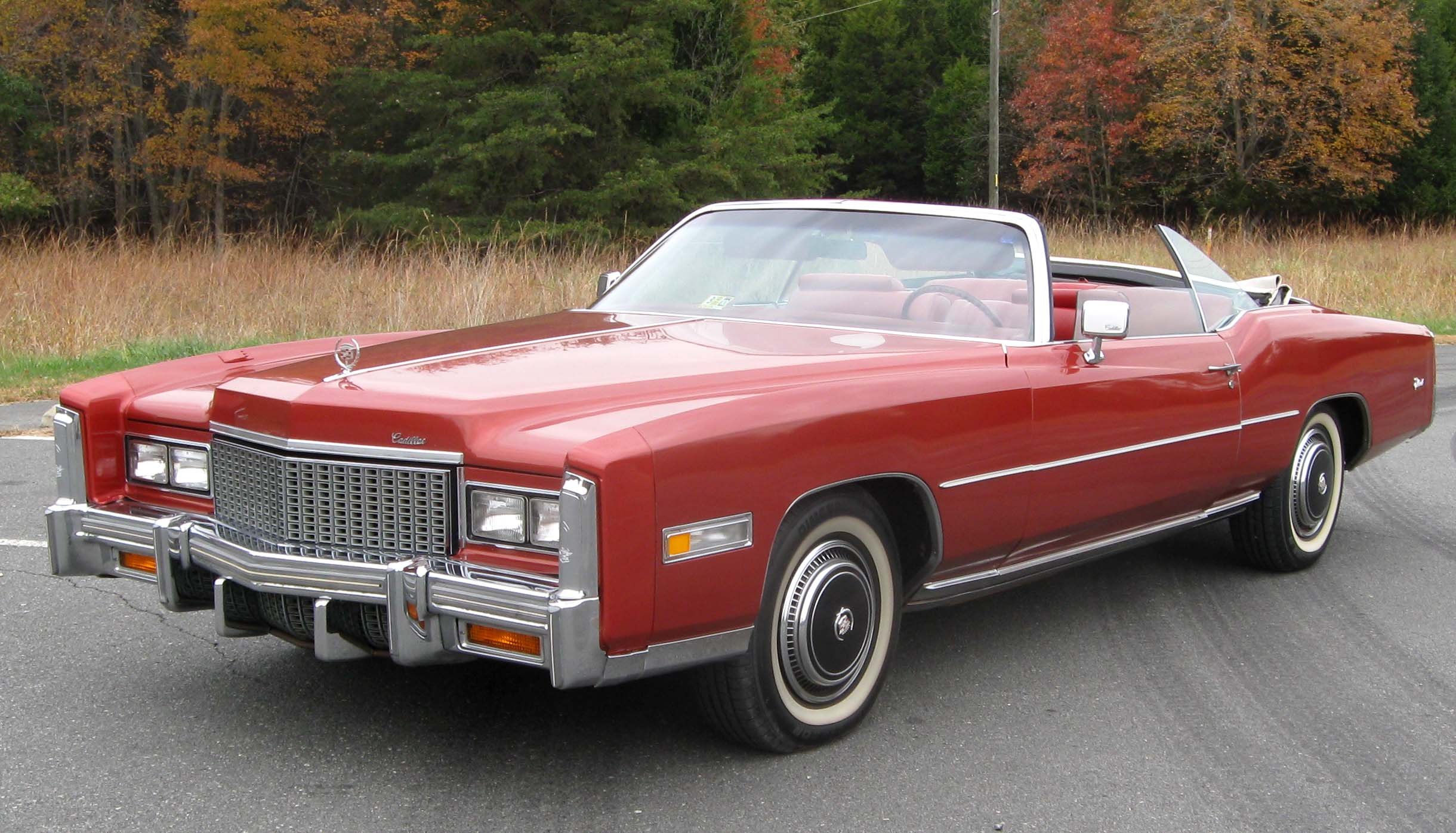
1976 Cadillac Eldorado

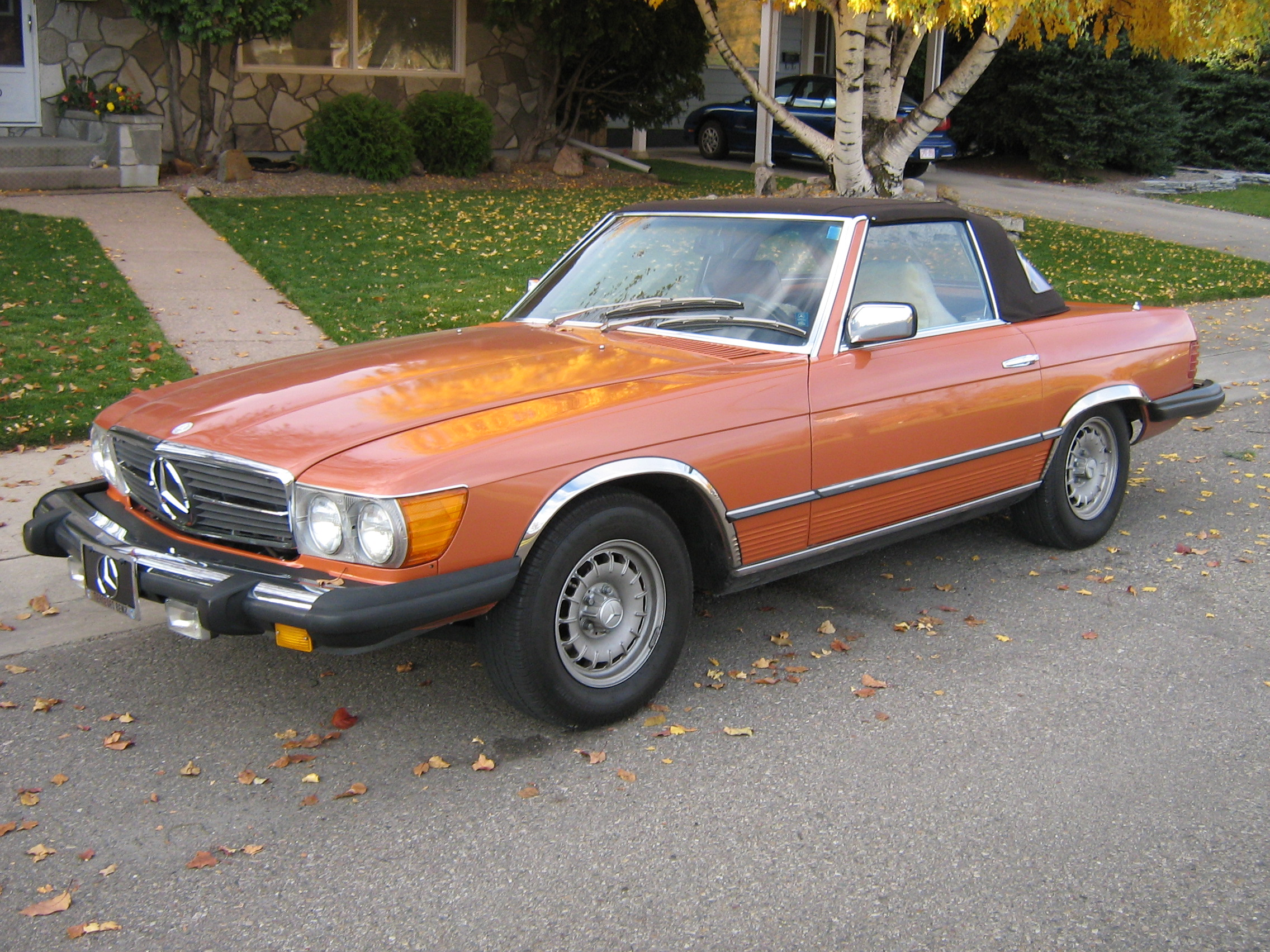
1974–1980 Mercedes-Benz 450SL

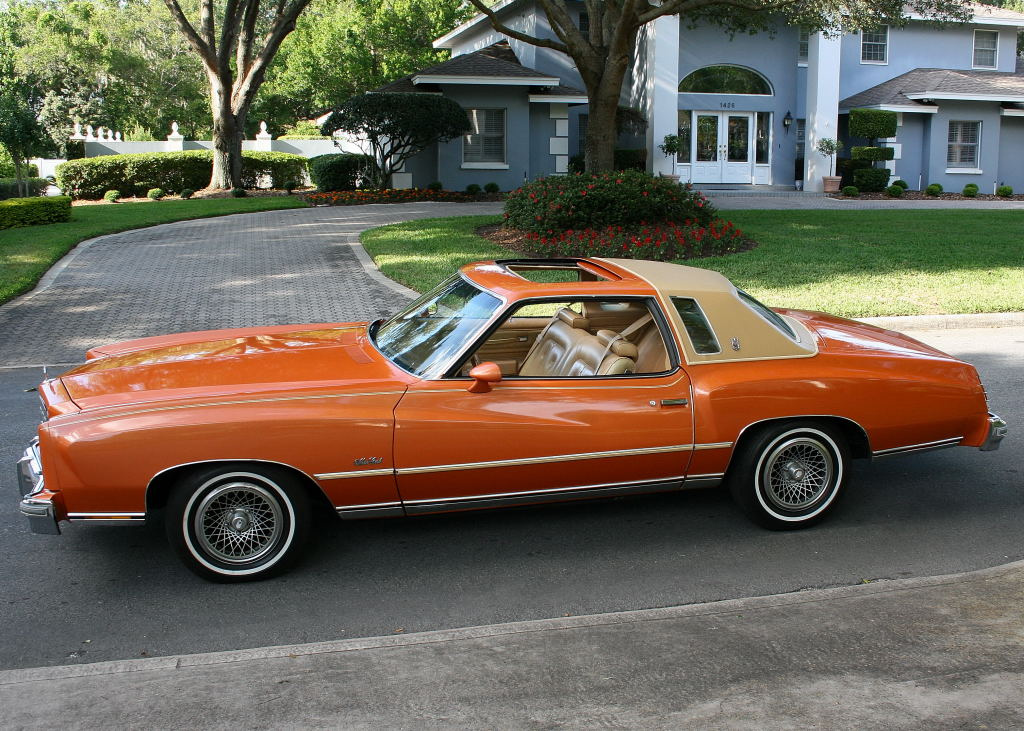
1977 Chevrolet Monte Carlo

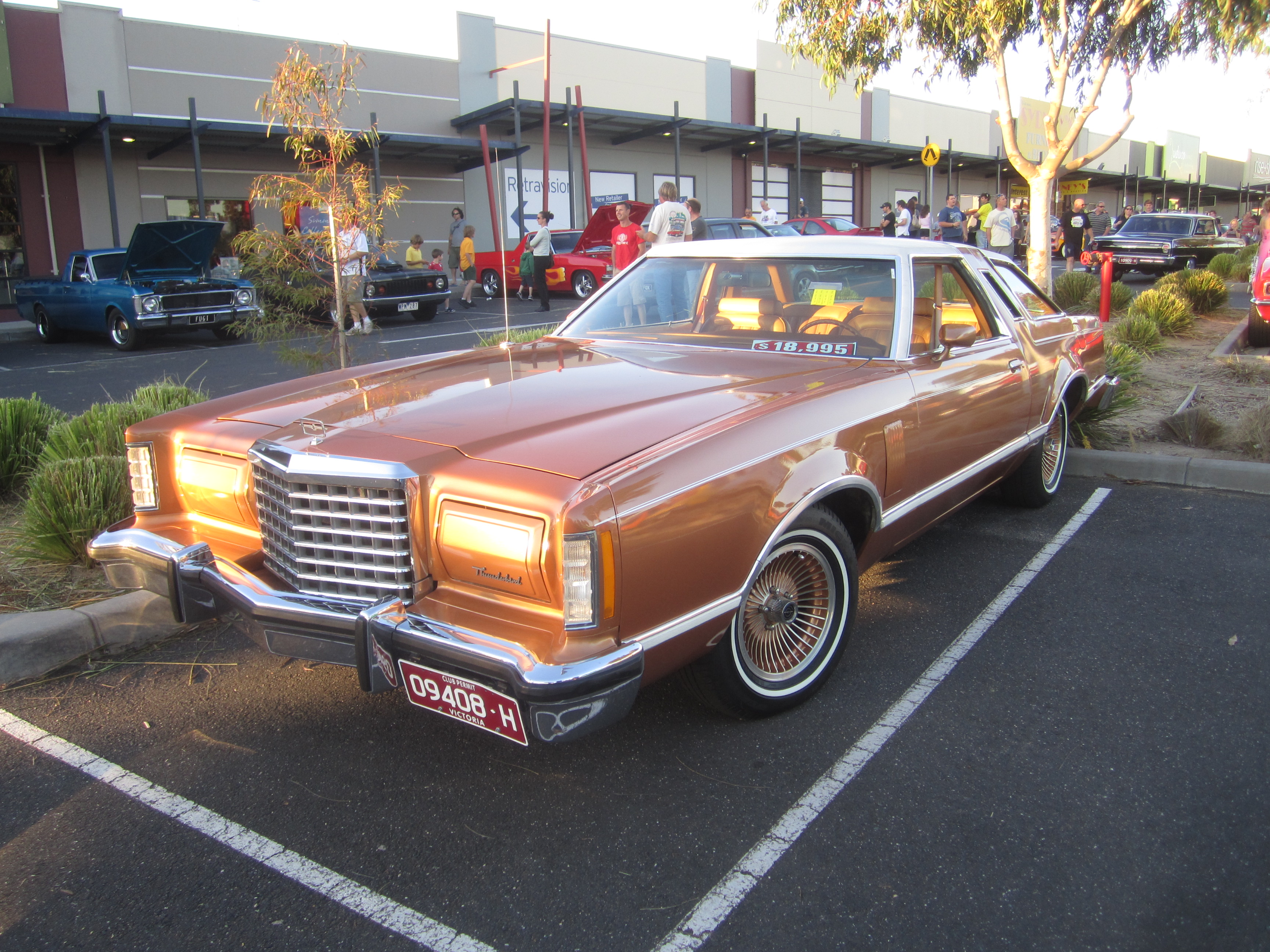
1977 Ford Thunderbird

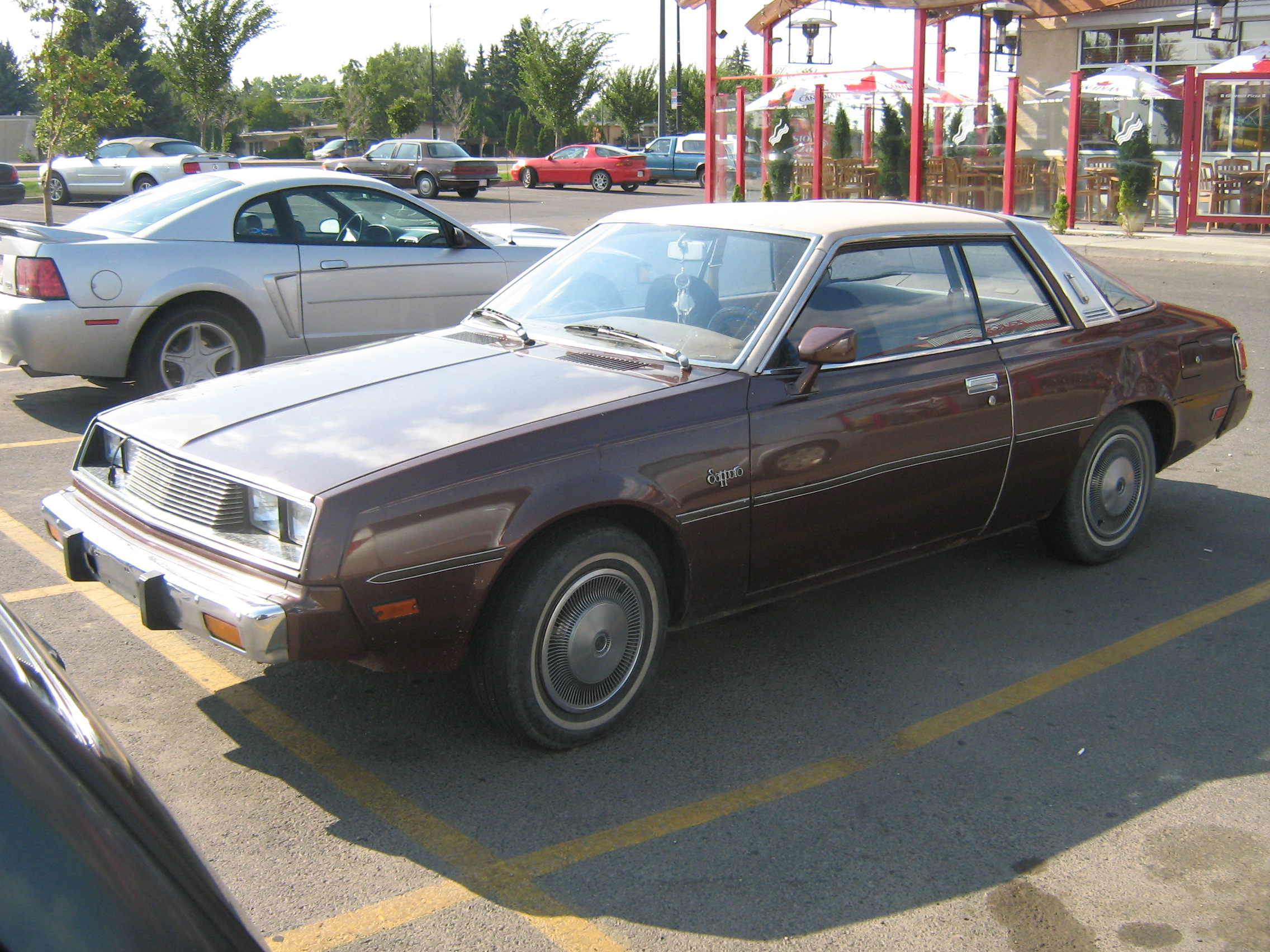
1978–1980 Plymouth Sapporo

Due to rising insurance costs and emissions standards in the early 1970s, the muscle car's decline coincided with a strong upswing in the personal luxury segment as American buyers shifted emphasis from performance to comfort. Offsetting this, the 1973 and 1979 oil crises impacted upon demand for cars with relatively poor fuel economy. The 1970s personal luxury models were marketed based on luxury, not performance. They were conventional in design and shared many parts with lesser models.

Due to the success of the 1969 Pontiac Grand Prix, other GM divisions followed suit and introduced similar cars in 1970. The Chevrolet Monte Carlo— considered an upscale vehicle for GM's lowest-priced division— was slightly shorter than the Grand Prix due to being built on the Chevrolet Chevelle platform. The Monte Carlo was marketed as providing "elegance and prestige", however, some reviewers found it more similar to Chevrolet's more utilitarian models. The coupe model of the downsized Oldsmobile Cutlass Supreme was introduced for 1970 and was sold alongside the larger Oldsmobile Toronado. The base prices of the Monte Carlo and Cutlass Supreme were lower than that of the Grand Prix. However, all three models were priced similarly when ordered with the same level of equipment. Nonetheless, it is claimed that Chevrolet and Pontiac "took personal luxury cars to the masses". The introduction of the Monte Carlo and Cutlass Supreme did cut into the Grand Prix's dominance, and sales dropped 40%.

The 1972 Ford Thunderbird (sixth generation) was redesigned with a significant increase in size over its predecessor, becoming larger than most other personal luxury cars. The 1974 Mercury Cougar XR-7 was upsized to an intermediate platform (shared with the Ford Torino and Mercury Montego). This was because the Mustang had been downsized to become the subcompact Mustang II for 1974, leaving the Cougar XR-7 without a platform-mate. The Cougar XR-7 was marketed from 1974 through 1976 alongside the Ford Elite, styled to resemble the Thunderbird, and marketed at a lower price. The Cougar XR-7 was priced higher than the Elite and included more standard features, but sold about 60,000 units compared to almost 125,000 Elites during the 1975 model year.

Foreign manufacturers capitalized on this American consumer trend. For example, Mercedes-Benz introduced the 450SL and SLC models. Total production was 237,287 (SL) and 62,888 (SLC), and North America was the key market for these models, with 2/3 of production officially sold there - before additional cars from the grey market. Mercedes-Benz were coy in their American ad copy about the car being a sports car, advising potential buyers "Spoil Yourself" and asking "How can a 2-seater weighing 3,500 pounds loaded down with an automatic transmission and luxury power amenities be considered a sports car?." The 450SL addressed the same market niche as the 1955-57 two-seat Ford Thunderbird personal car, which had similar categorization issues.

The mid-size Chrysler Cordoba was introduced in 1975 as the company's first coupe explicitly produced for the personal luxury market (despite the company declaring earlier that there would "never be a smaller Chrysler"). The Cordoba used vintage styling cues such as Rolls-Royce-style radiator grilles, opera windows, and vinyl roofs. By 1975, other models that had entered the personal luxury car segment included the AMC Matador (second generation), Buick Regal, and Dodge Charger (fourth generation). The two highest-selling personal luxury cars for 1975 were the Chevrolet Monte Carlo and the Chrysler Cordoba.

During the mid-1970s, luxury features became more common in compact and subcompact cars. The 1978 Plymouth Sapporo coupe (a rebadged Mitsubishi Galant Lambda built in Japan) was marketed as a personal luxury car, featuring a vinyl roof with stainless steel targa band, velour interior, "luxury" wheel covers with whitewall tires, and various power accessories.

For the 1977 model year, the Ford Thunderbird (seventh generation) was downsized to an intermediate-size platform (based on the Ford LTD II), shedding nearly 10 inches (254 mm) of length and 900 lb (408 kg) of weight. It was repositioned as the replacement for the Ford Elite and sold alongside the closely related Mercury Cougar (fourth generation). The Thunderbird was assembled using a mix of body, interior, and trim parts from the previous year's Ford Elite, Mercury Montego, and Mercury Cougar, plus unique styling for the rear bodywork. This generation became the best-selling in the history of the Ford Thunderbird. Helped by a $2,700 price reduction from 1976, over 318,000 sold in 1977 and 352,000 in 1978 (the best single sales year in Thunderbird history), followed by 295,000 in 1979.

The 1978 Buick Regal, Chevrolet Monte Carlo, Oldsmobile Cutlass Supreme, and the Pontiac Grand Prix were among the first of the personal luxury cars to be radically downsized, resulting in weight reductions of more than 900 pounds (408 kg) and exterior dimensions similar to compact cars (e.g., the Chevrolet Nova, Ford Granada, and Dodge Dart).

For 1979, Cadillac Eldorado (tenth generation), Buick Riviera (sixth generation), and Oldsmobile Toronado (third generation) were downsized to an intermediate-sized front-wheel-drive platform, resulting in a 20 in (508 mm) reduction in length in the case of the Eldorado. Engines were also downsized, with V6 engines available in the Riviera and Toronado models for the first time. The Riviera was named the 1979 Motor Trend Car of the Year. Sales more than doubled to 52,181 for 1979 and reached 48,621 units for the similar 1980 models.

=== 1980s ===
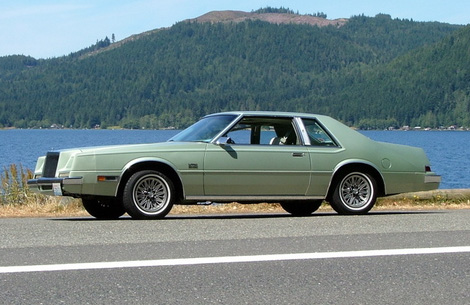
1981 Imperial

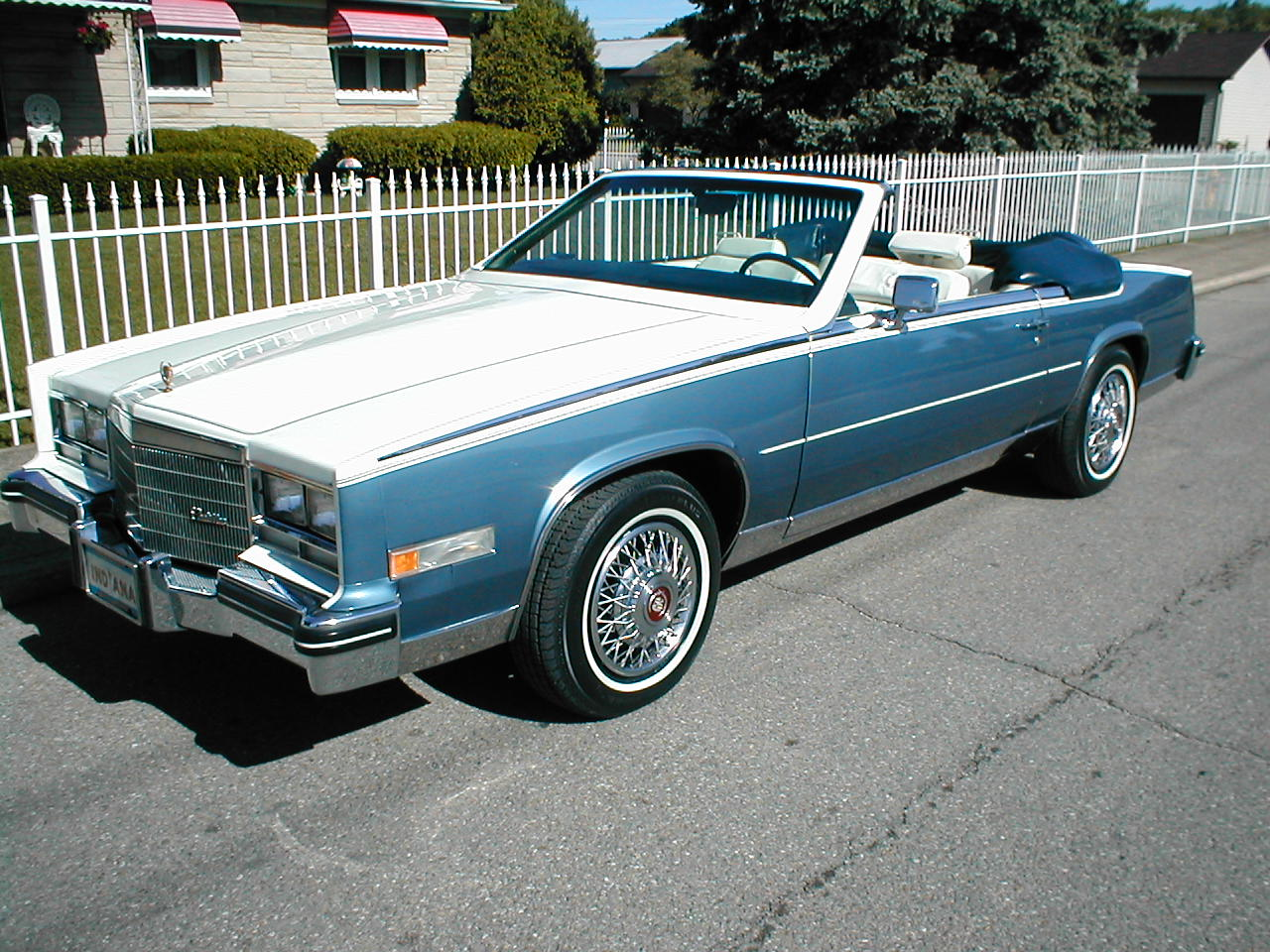
1985 Cadillac Eldorado Convertible

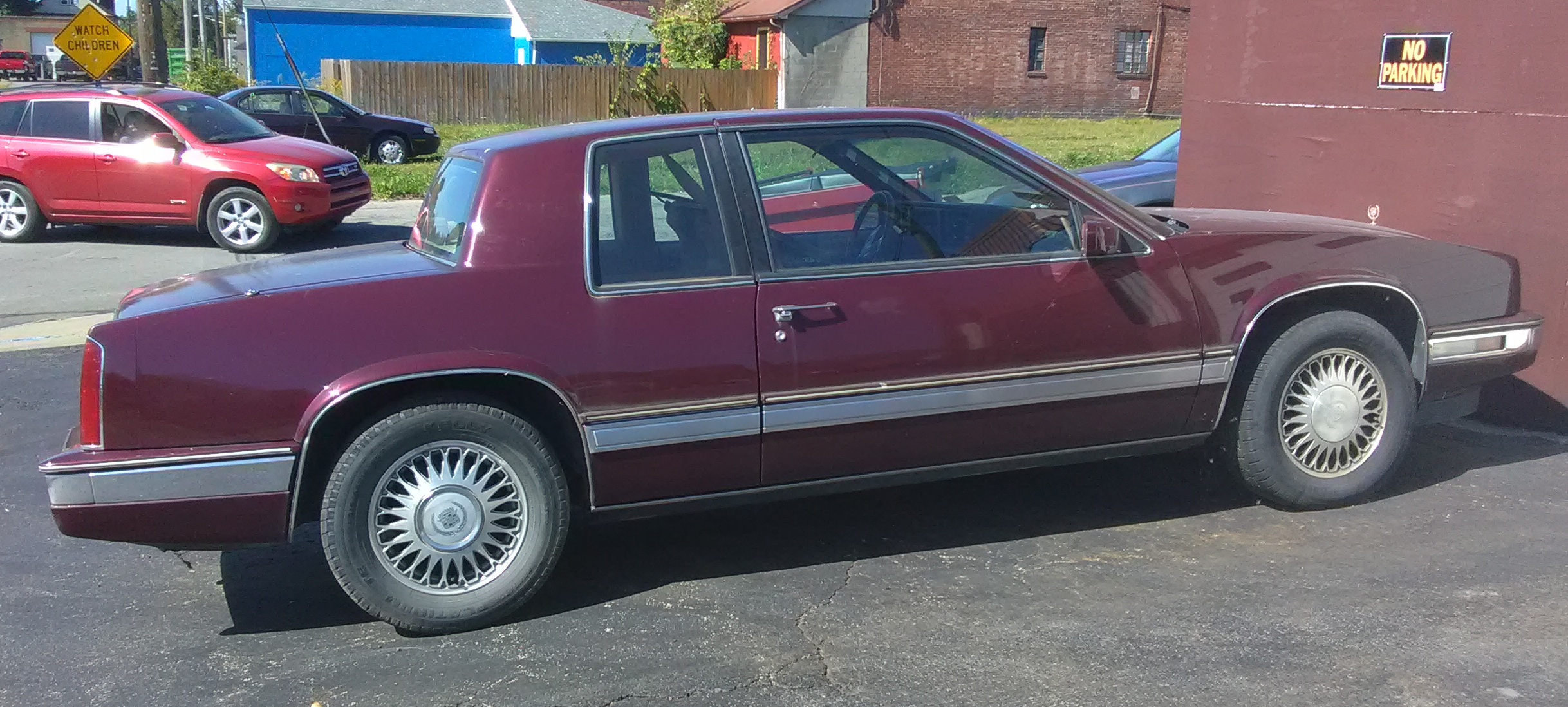
1986 Cadillac Eldorado

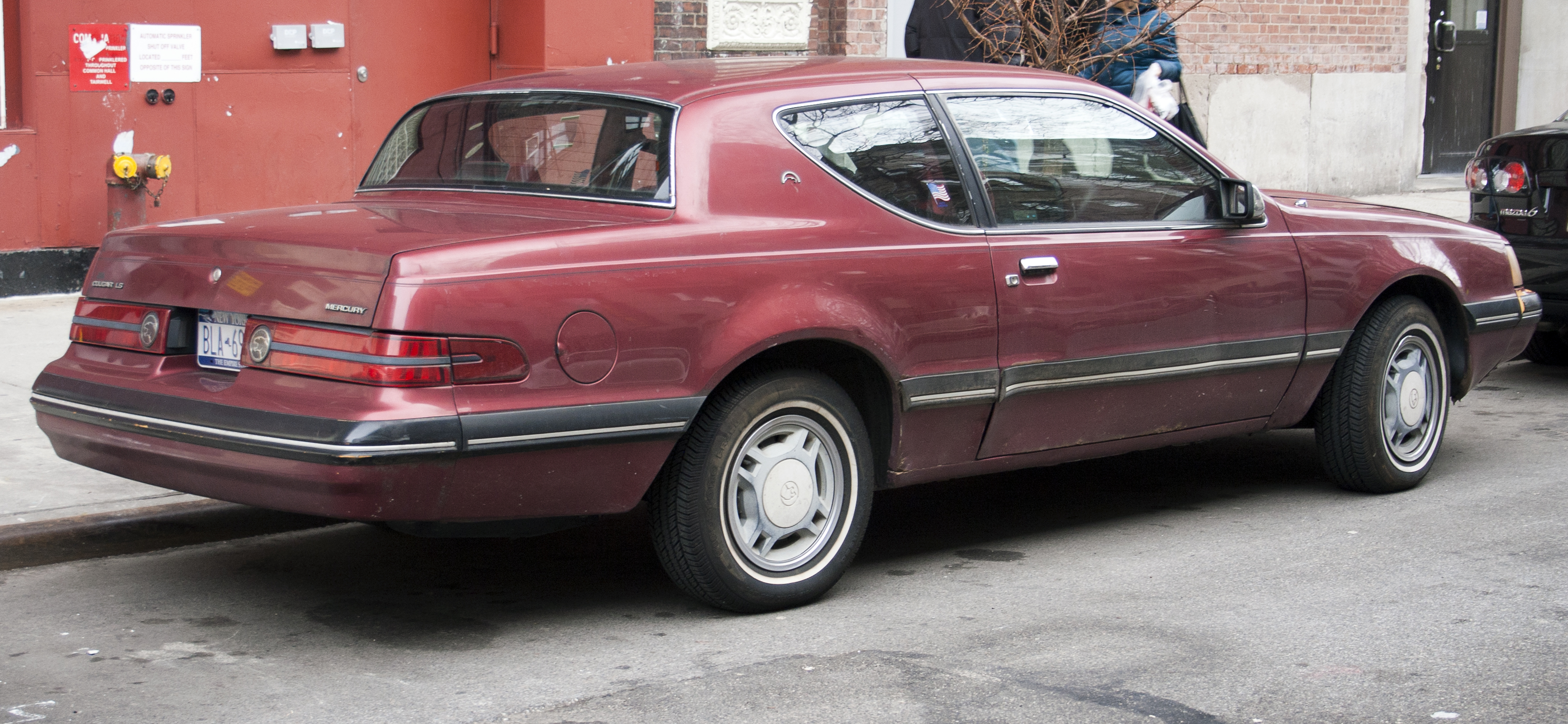
1987–1988 Mercury Cougar

Throughout the 1970s, American-built personal luxury cars had grown larger and more luxurious, resulting in heavier cars. However, engine power output decreased because of the use of six-cylinder engines or detuning the V8 engines to comply with increasingly strict vehicle emissions standards. Along with the reduced straight-line performance, the cars also had poor fuel economy. They also needed to meet the rising corporate average fuel economy (CAFE) regulations set by the United States Secretary of Transportation through the National Highway Traffic Safety Administration.

The 1981 Imperial (sixth generation) by Chrysler Corporation marked a key milestone in the decline of the personal luxury car. The 318 cu in (5.2 L) V8 engine produced only 140 hp (104 kW), Reaction in the motoring press was especially vicious, with Car and Driver referring to this Imperial as an outmoded all-frosting automobile. Sales were poor. The Imperial was built on the Chrysler Cordoba (second generation) chassis, a car with declining sales that was discontinued in 1983.

The 1980 model year Ford Thunderbird (eighth generation) and Mercury Cougar (fifth generation) were downsized to a mid-size car and described by some as "stodgy-looking". Sales fell, resulting in extensive revisions for the 1983 model year. While remaining a personal luxury coupe, the redesign of the Thunderbird and Cougar introduced an aerodynamic body design to Ford vehicles in North America and experienced increased sales.

In 1981, sales of the Continental Mark VI were down 50%.

For the 1984 model year, the Continental Mark VII was downsized to a mid-size classification, with aerodynamic styling based on the Ford Fox platform shared with the Ford Thunderbird and Mercury Cougar.

For 1986, General Motors drastically downsized the Cadillac Eldorado (eleventh generation), Buick Riviera (seventh generation), and Oldsmobile Toronado (fourth generation) by 13–16 in (330–406 mm). With an Eldorado Coupe unit sales drop of 72% in 1986, an unusual case for such a decline in annual sales. The base price of the 1986 Eldorado increased by approximately 16% to $24,251, and production was reduced to about a quarter of what it had been just two years earlier. The Riviera and Toronado used Buick's 232 cu in (3.8 L) V6 engine, while Cadillac continued to use their 250 cu in (4.1 L) V8 engine. Similarly, the 1986 Riviera's base price increased substantially to $19,831, and sales plummeted to 22,138 for 1986, only 15,223 for 1987, and 8,625 for 1988 (although the 1988 introduction of the Buick Reatta coupe may have cannibalized some Riviera sales that year).

The final year of production for the rear-wheel-drive Oldsmobile Cutlass Supreme (fourth generation) was 1988, during which 27,678 were built.

For the 1988 model year, GM moved the Buick Regal, Oldsmobile Cutlass Supreme, and Pontiac Grand Prix to versions based on its front-wheel-drive W-body platform. The Chevrolet Monte Carlo was discontinued after a short 1988 model year run (replaced by the 1990 Chevrolet Lumina mid-size coupe). With the discontinuation of the Chevrolet Celebrity and Pontiac 6000, the Regal, Cutlass Supreme, and Grand Prix moved from the personal luxury segment to the conventional mid-size segment and were also offered in the four-door sedan body style.

=== 1990s ===
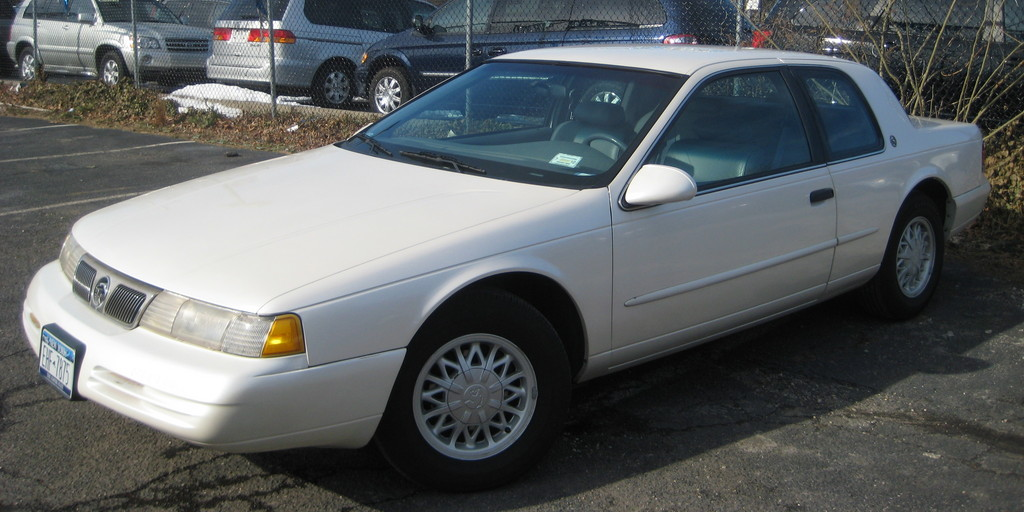
1995 Mercury Cougar XR7

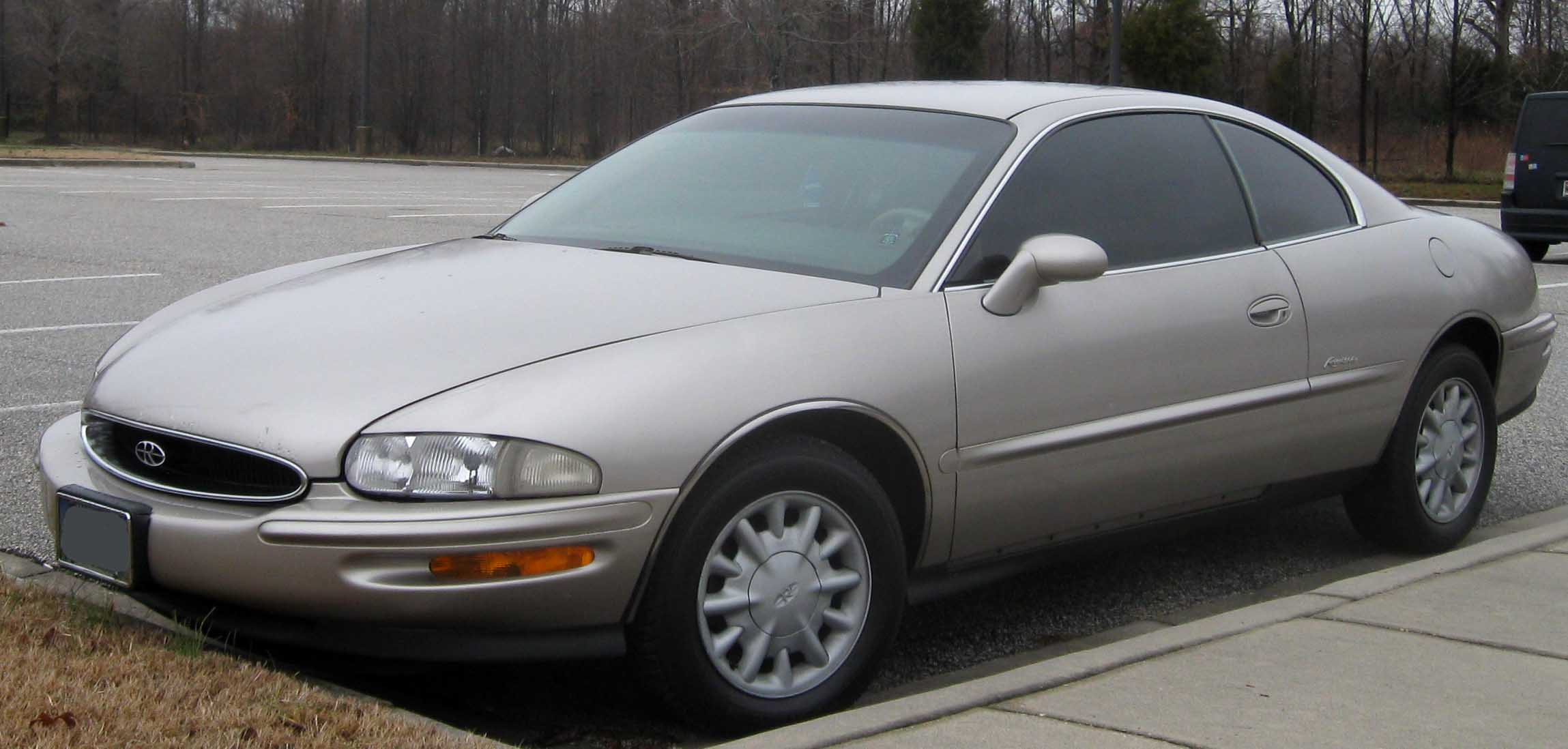
1995–1999 Buick Riviera

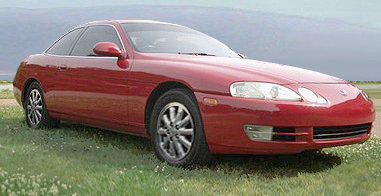
1991 Lexus SC 400

In the early 1990s, the trend towards four-door sedans and SUVs caused the market for personal luxury cars to decline even more. The Oldsmobile Toronado was discontinued in 1992. The Ford Thunderbird and Mercury Cougar were discontinued after the 1997 model year (although the Cougar nameplate was revived for 1999 as a mid-size sport compact).

The Lincoln Mark VIII, introduced for 1993, was discontinued in 1998, thereby ending the Mark series. The total production of Mark VIII was slightly more than 126,000 units. General Motors ended production of the Buick Riviera in 1998, with 1,956 cars produced in the final model year.

Toyota launched the Lexus luxury brand in North America in 1989. A key product was the uniquely designed 1991 Lexus SC personal luxury coupe, to compete with the Cadillac Eldorado and Lincoln Mark. In 2001, the model was replaced by a smaller convertible.

For the 1995 model year, the Chevrolet Monte Carlo was re-introduced and built on the front-wheel drive GM W-body platform. It was the two-door coupe version of the updated Lumina four-door sedan replacing the previous year's Lumina two-door coupe.

=== 2000s ===
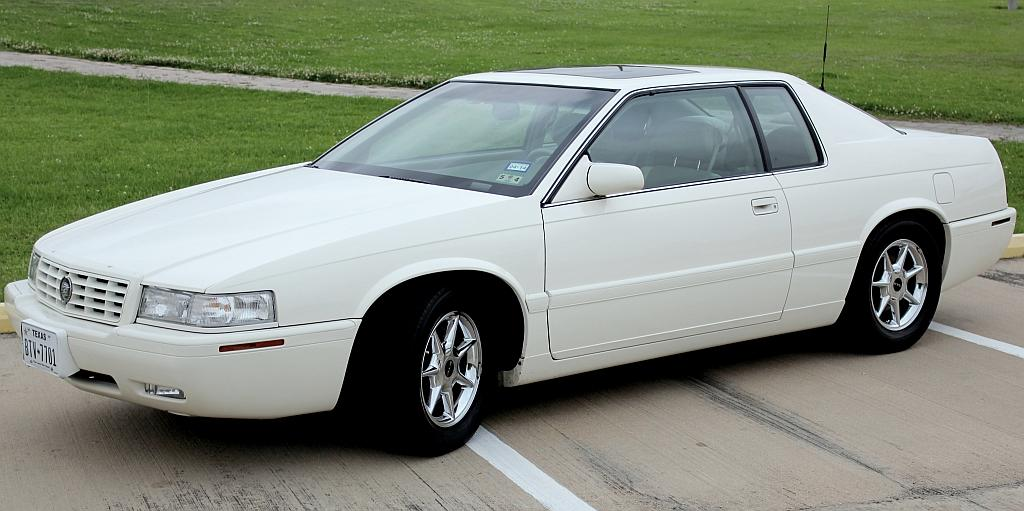
2002 Cadillac Eldorado

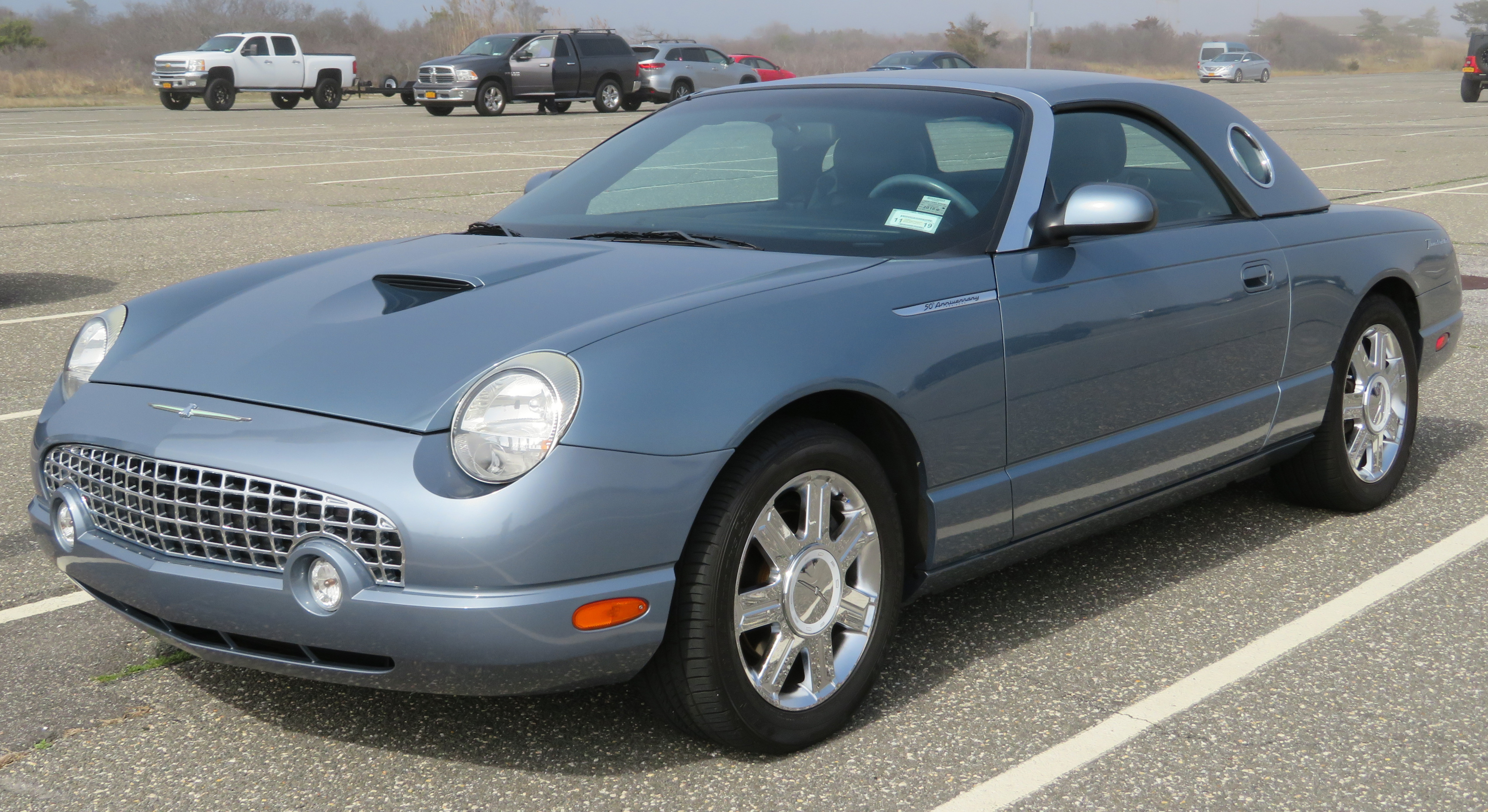
2005 Ford Thunderbird

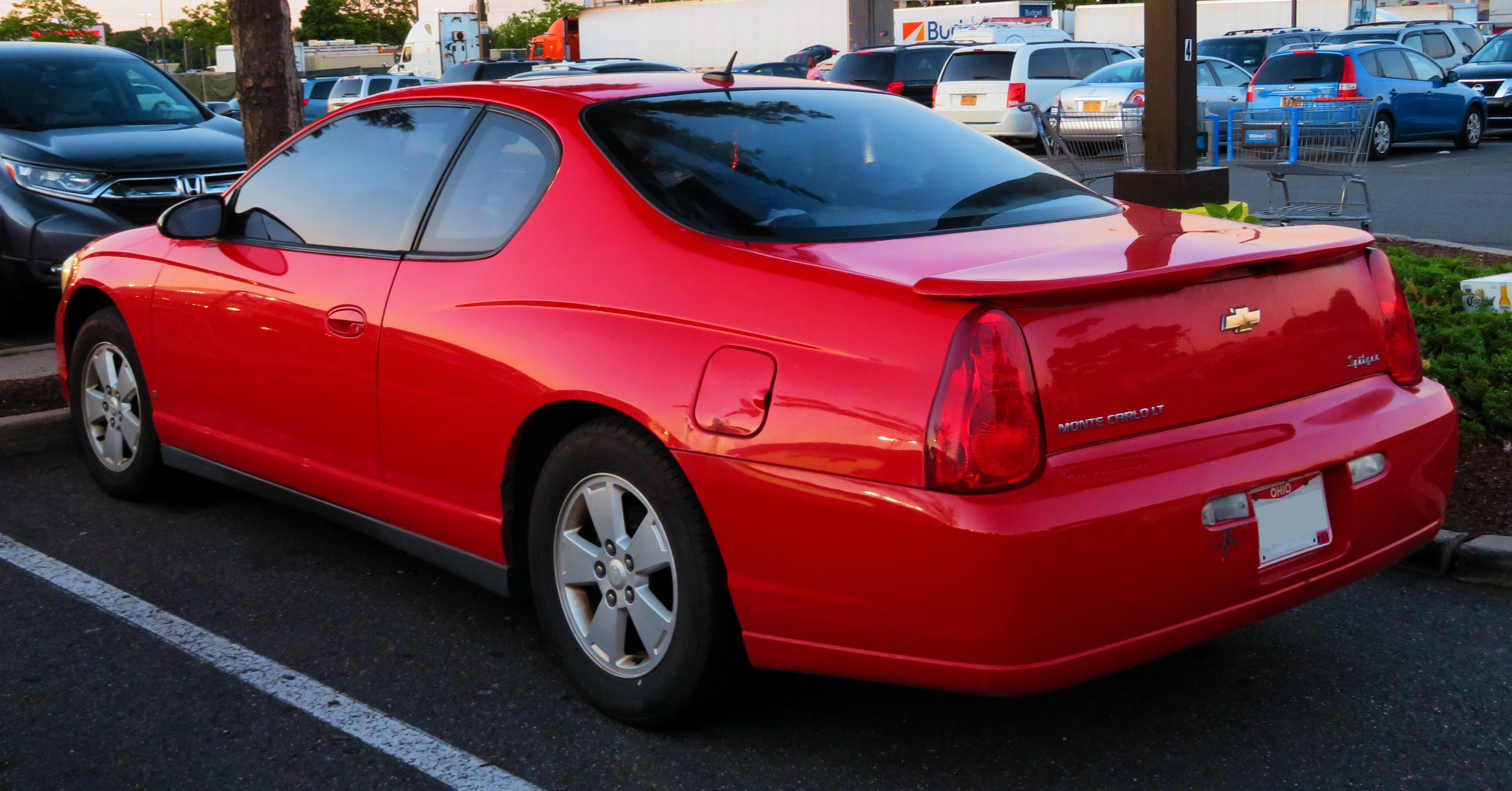
2006 Chevrolet Monte Carlo

In 2001, General Motors announced that the Eldorado's 50th model year (2002) would be its last. To mark the end of the nameplate, a limited production run of 1,596 cars was produced in red or white—the colors available on the original 1953 convertible. Production ended on April 22, 2002. The Lansing Craft Centre was retooled to build the Chevrolet SSR.

The Ford Thunderbird (eleventh generation) was introduced for the 2002 model year. It retained the traditional rear-wheel drive layout and was based on the Ford DEW platform. With styling cues from the original 1955 through 1957 Thunderbirds, it was part of an early-2000s retro styling trend that included the Volkswagen New Beetle, Chrysler PT Cruiser, Plymouth/Chrysler Prowler and Mini Hatch. It was initially well received by the automotive press, garnering accolades such as the Motor Trend Car of the Year and a nomination for the North American Car of the Year in its first year. However, many publications did not regard the Thunderbird's revival that highly. It garnered a place on Car and Driver magazine's 2009 list of "The 10 Most Embarrassing Award Winners in Automotive History". Sales did not meet Ford's expectations and the Thunderbird was discontinued in 2005.

The 2000 Chevrolet Monte Carlo (sixth generation) was also influenced by the retro trend, incorporating styling cues from its 1970s and 1980s predecessors. The Monte Carlo was the final American personal luxury car in production when it was discontinued at the end of the 2007 model year.

Coupes available in the mid-2020s that fit the classic definition of a personal luxury car include the Rolls-Royce Spectre and eight-generation Dodge Charger, with options for the Charger including leather interior, larger leg room, and engines rated above 500 hp.

== See also ==
- Coupé
- Convertible
- Grand tourer
- Luxury car
- Malaise era
- Muscle car
