= Continental Automobile Manufacturing Company =

Defunct American motor vehicle manufacturer

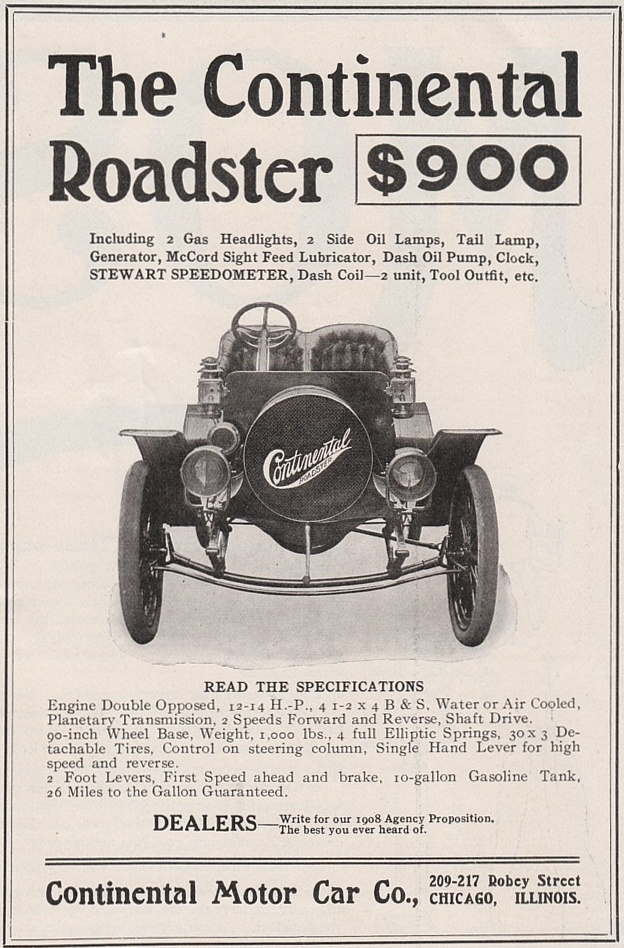
1907 Continental advertisement from The Automobile.

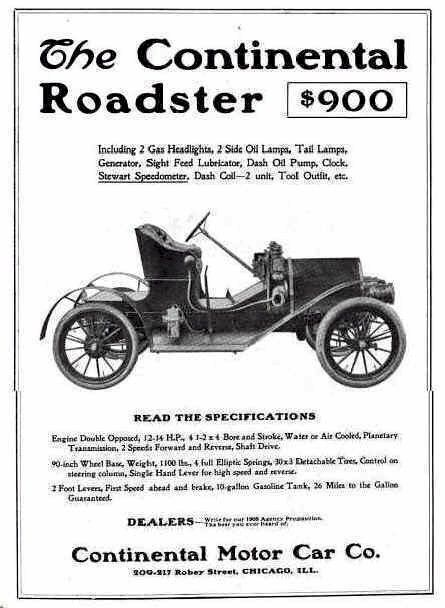
1907 Continental advertisement

This Continental car was built by the University Automobile Company located in New Haven. It was renamed the Continental Automobile Manufacturing Company in 1908. Chief engineer was C. S. Johnson. There is no known connection with other Continental automobiles.

The New Haven-built Continentals had front-mounted four-cylinder engines. Pictures indicate that power was brought to the rear wheels by a pair of chains. These cars are easily recognizable by their perfectly round radiator and barrel-shaped hood. There was a large script reading "Continental" and "New Haven" in the underlining.

The model line-up for 1907-1908 was as follows:

Model	Engine	Horsepower (Note: Continental used A.L.A.M. horsepower, which does not correspond with modern bhp or kW.)	Wheelbase	Coachwork	Price
A	4 cyl.	25	100 in (250 cm)	Runabout	$2,400
B	4 cyl.	30	112 in (280 cm)	Tonneau	$2,700
C	4 cyl.	35	120 in (300 cm)	Touring	$3,000

A Continental runabout driven by Johnson at the Yale University Automobile Club spring 1907 meet went 60mph. Three Continentals participated in the 1907 Glidden Tour, C.S. Johnson among them. He did not finish the tour as he was arrested for speeding and the collision with a trolley in Dayton (Ohio).
