= Continental Bank Building (Salt Lake City) =

Historic building in Salt Lake City, Utah, U.S.

- U.S. National Register of Historic Places
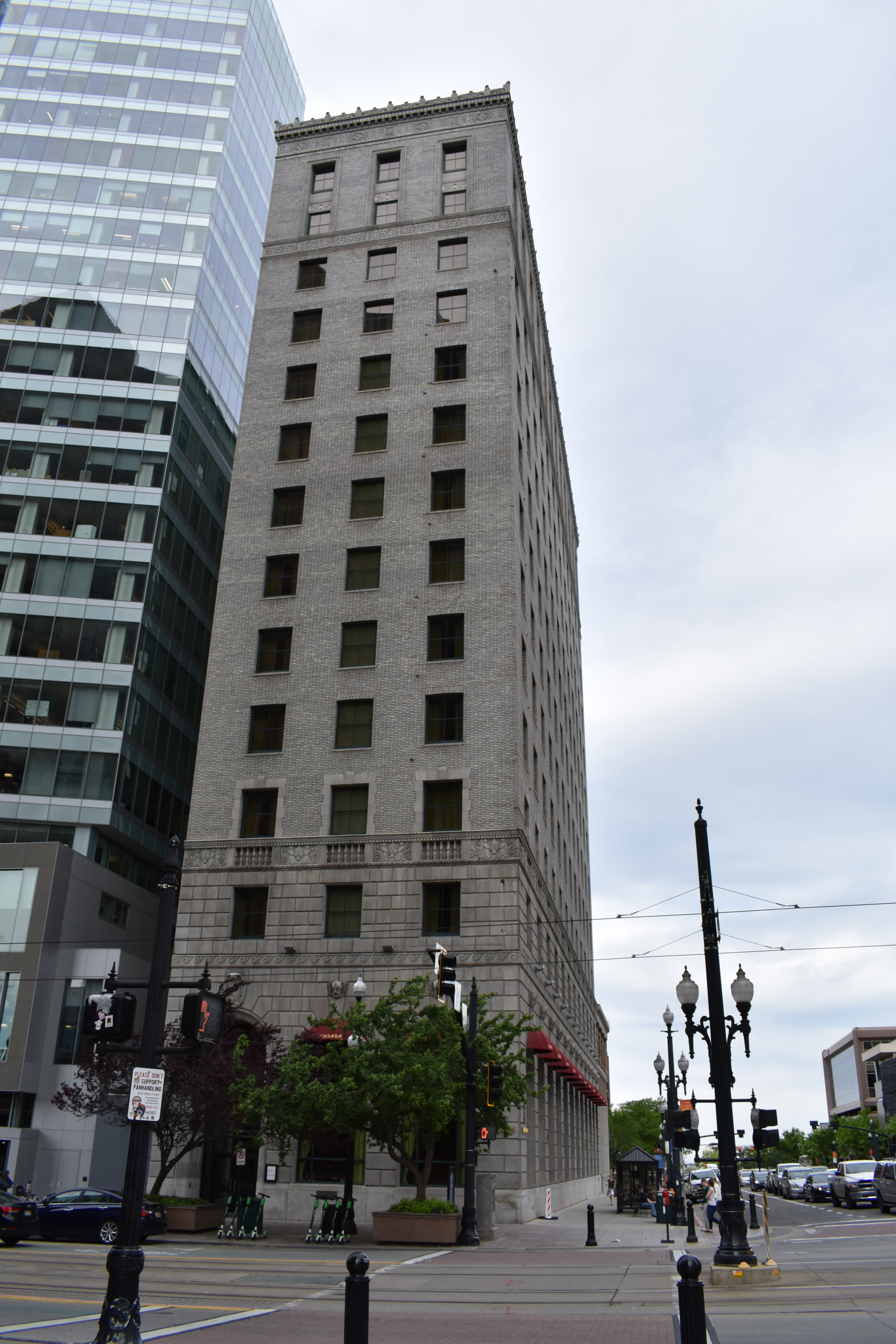
- Continental Bank Building, May 2019

- Location within Utah Location within the United States
- Location: 200 South Main Street, Salt Lake City, Utah; United States
- Coordinates: 40°45′53″N 111°53′27″W
- Area: less than one acre
- Built: 1923
- Architect: George William Kelham
- Architectural style: Late 19th And 20th Century Revivals, Second Renaissance Revival
- MPS: Salt Lake City Business District MRA
- NRHP reference No.: 82004850
- Added to NRHP: December 27, 1982

The Continental Bank Building (now known as the Hotel Monaco) is a historic 13-story commercial building in downtown Salt Lake City, Utah, United States, that is listed on the National Register of Historic Places (NRHP).

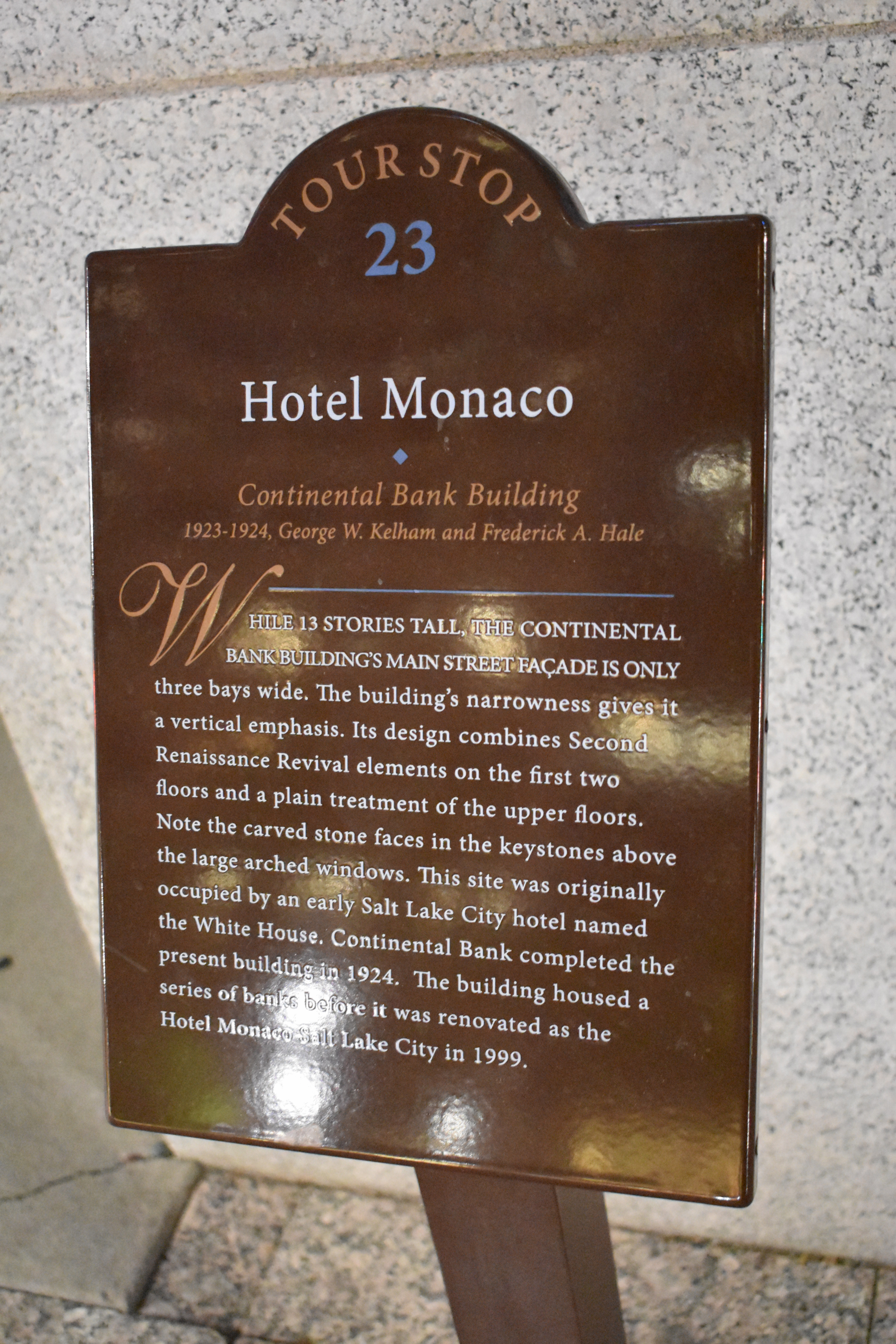
Hotel Monaco sign in the building, May 2019

== Description ==
The building was constructed in 1923. The facade is eclectic, showing Second Renaissance Revival elements at the first two floors and utilitarian features above, and the building includes a modest, classical cornice.

Designed by George W. Kelham in 1922, the building was constructed on the former site of the National Bank of the Republic after a merger of banks controlled by James E. Cosgriff. After Cosgriff's death in 1938, his son, Walter E. Cosgriff, eventually became president of the bank. The building became home to Kimpton Hotel Monaco in 1999.

The Continental Bank Building was added to the NRHP December 27, 1982.

== See also ==
- National Register of Historic Places listings in Salt Lake City
