= HomeStreet Bank =

American bank

HomeStreet Inc.
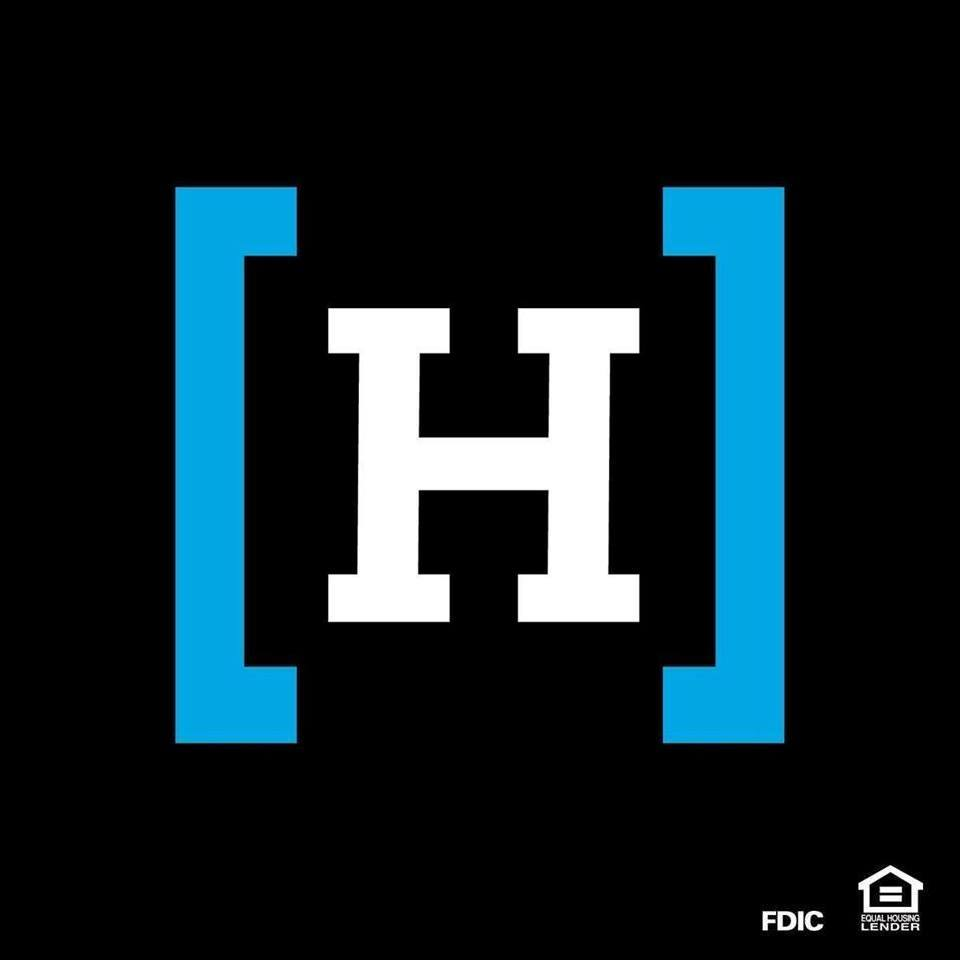
- Type: Public
- Traded as: Nasdaq: HMST
- Industry: Commercial banking
- Founded: 1921; 105 years ago, in Seattle, Washington, United States
- Headquarters: 601 Union Street; Seattle, Washington, United States
- Number of locations: 67
- Key people: Mark Mason (chairman and CEO)
- Products: Checking accounts Savings accounts Retirement accounts Mortgage loans Personal investing Private banking Business loans
- Revenue: ▲US$264.32 million (2019)
- Net income: ▲US$17.51 million (2019)
- Total assets: $6.8 billion (December 31, 2019)
- Number of employees: 1,071 (December 31, 2019)
- Website: homestreet.com

HomeStreet, Inc., d.b.a HomeStreet Bank, together with its subsidiaries, provides various financial services primarily in Washington, Oregon, California, and Hawaii.

Currently headquartered in Seattle, Washington, the company was founded as Continental Mortgage and Loan Company in 1921 by W. Walter Williams. After its name changed to Continental Savings Bank in 1986, its name changed again to HomeStreet Bank in May 2000.

After the 2008 financial crisis, the bank suffered heavy losses. In 2012, in order to satisfy regulatory capital requirements, it raised $89 million in an IPO, ending four generations of control by the Williams family.

In 2018, it won a court case following its attempt to stop a hedge fund placing its own candidates on the board. In November, it was announced that the bank would acquire the San Marcos, California retail branch and business lending team of Silvergate Bank, expecting to complete these transactions in the middle of the following year.

On March 24, 2020, HomeStreet suspended its $27 million stock buyback plan during the COVID-19 pandemic.

On September 2, 2025, it was reported that the firm completed the merger of its operations with those of Mechanics Bank, whose name and banking corporation remained after the transaction.

== Sponsorships ==
- Seattle Seahawks
- Miss Madison, an H1 Unlimited hydroplane
- Seafair

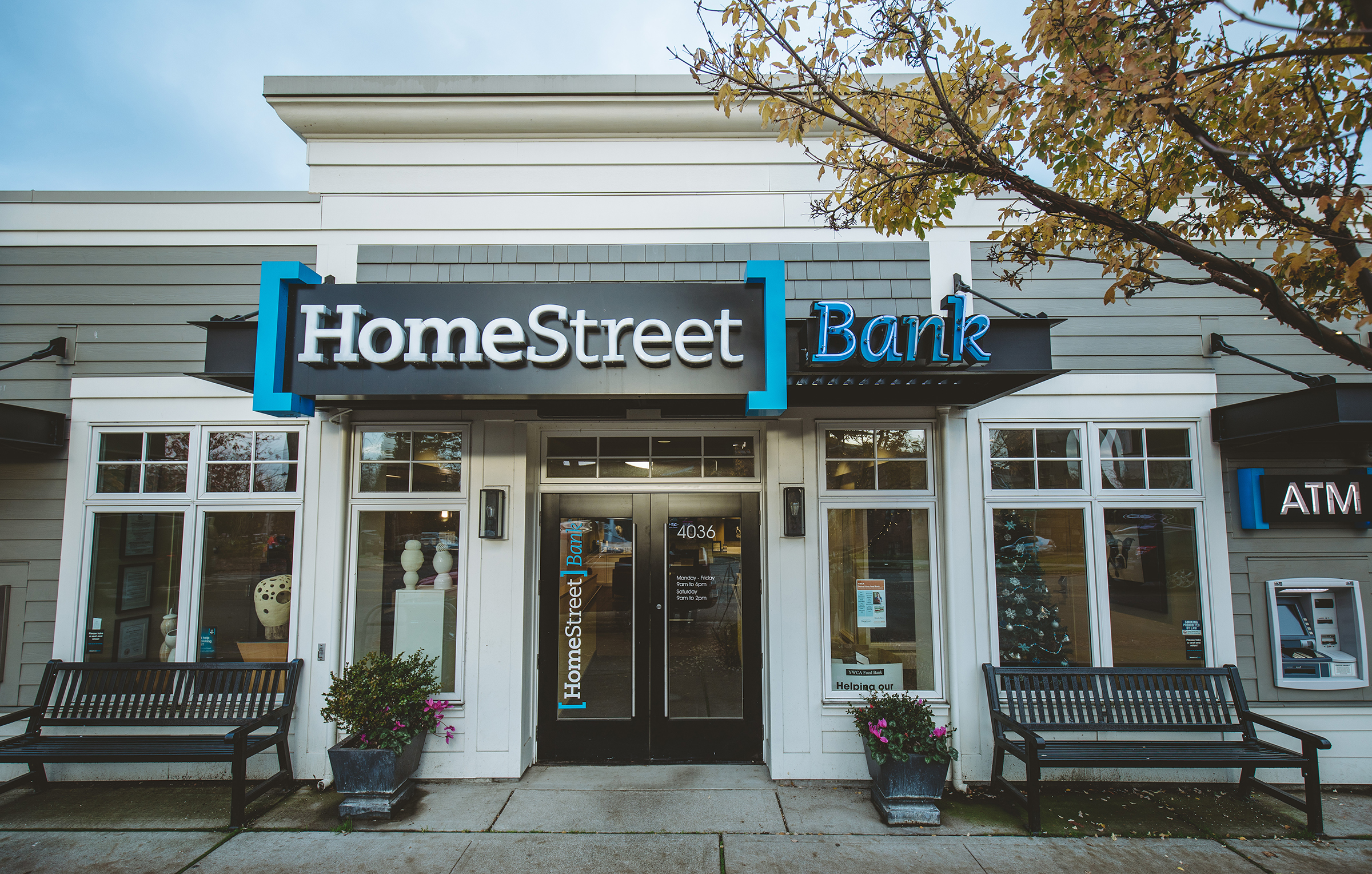
Madison Park location in Seattle, WA
