= Televisión Continental =

Peruvian television channel

- Type: Television network
- Country: Peru
- Broadcast area: Arequipa, Cusco, Puno, Moquegua, Tacna

Programming
- Picture format: 4:3 SDTV

Ownership
- Owner: Radio y Televisión Continental

History
- Launched: November 10, 1962; 63 years ago

Availability

Terrestrial
- Analog VHF: Channel 5 (Arequipa)

Televisión Continental was a Peruvian over-the-air television station broadcasting from the city of Arequipa, with coverage in several provinces in the south of the country. It signed on in 1962, broadcasting on channel 6, but after experiencing decays due to increased competition, it moved to channel 5 in 2002 and gradually became a relayer of ATV. At its apex, it had 32 relay stations.

== History ==
Compañía Peruana de Radiodifusion S.A., a conglomerate of radio stations, launched Radio Continental in Arequipa on October 11, 1940, run by brothers Antonio and Enrique Umbert, then shareholders of said company. Important journalists and announcers such as Humberto Martínez Morosini, Zenaida Solís, Eduardo San Román, among others, passed through this station, who would later move to Lima.

Televisión Continental was launched on November 10, 1962, owned by Antonio Umbert, on VHF channel 6 of Arequipa and became the second channel in the city, after the launch of Televisora Sur Peruana on channel 2 (today Panamericana Televisión Arequipa). In addition, it becomes an affiliate station of América Televisión and retransmits programming from that channel, as well as making its own productions.

The expansion to the rest of southern Peru began in 1964, with the installation of repeater stations in Espinar (Cusco) and Toquepala (Tacna), until there were almost 30 repeaters in 1993.

When the dictatorship started in 1971, its programming was a mirror of América Televisión, except for a news bulletin and a local entertainment program. A study conducted in 1974 said that, out of the two channels available there, Continental stood out as the most-watched, with the Panamericana affiliate (channel 2). At the time, its local news bulletins aired at 12:45pm and 4pm, while at 8pm it relayed the network news from Lima.

In 1979, Continental Television began color broadcasts. In 1989, a percentage of the channel was sold to businessman Julio Vera Abad, also known for having been the owner of the Lima television stations ATV and Uranio 15. That year, the station started airing Noticiero del Sur, directed by journalist Juan Carlos Tafur. In 1990, a US$700,000 debt was approved; later in 1991, the Umbert brothers left América Televisión's shareholder structure, causing the beginning of its downfall.

Since 1993, the channel went into decline for various reasons, such as the sale of 42% of Compañía Peruana de Radiodifusión to the Mexican group Televisa. As consequence, Televisión Continental was separated from América Televisión, although it continued to relay its programming until 1996, when it acquired its own frequency for Arequipa on channel 13. In addition, the National University of San Agustín, which co-produced some slots on both channel 6 and channel 2, stopped participating in these channels because it founded its own production company (TV UNSA) in 1993 and in 1996 it began broadcasting on UHF channel 45 of Arequipa. With the end of its relations with América, Continental removed all of the network's programming at the end of the broadcast day for July 20, 1996, América's relay started the following day.

The appearance of América's relay station led to a widespread frequency change in Arequipa, Televisión Continental was studying the possibility of moving to channel 5.

The channel began to go through financial problems. Its programming, starting in 1996, consisted of pirated montages of subscription television channels, live signals from international channels such as C-SPAN, Deutsche Welle, Clara Visión, infomercials from Quality Products, some original programs such as Noticiero Continental, Deporte Total and slots from independent production companies. Of the 30 repeaters it had at the regional level, only three remained in Arequipa, Punta de Bombón and Moquegua.

In 2002, Radio y Televisión Continental was divided into two companies:

- Bicolor Radio: In the hands of the Umbert family; controlled Radio Continental 740 AM.
- Continental Television: Which would pass into the hands of the ATV Group with the television licenses, since Julio Vera Abad acquired part of Continental in 1989.

The building that housed the station, located on Independencia Avenue, was sold to a well-known institute to pay off part of its large debts. The license of Radio Continental 93.5 FM was transferred to Corporación Universal of the Capuñay family and since 2017 it has been owned by the RPP Group. Previously, Radio Corazón was broadcast on this frequency and Radio Oxígeno is currently broadcast.

=== Later events ===
The Ministry of Transportation and Communications ordered the change of frequency from channel 6 to channel 5, which caused Andina de Radiodifusión to install a new transmitter through which it would begin its transmissions as a repeater, except for a daily half-hour news service.

Local production as well as advertising was limited to early morning hours, from the new Radio Continental location, a smaller location located in the Arequipa Public Charity Building. This practice continued until 2011, when Grupo ATV acquired channel 9 (today ATV Sur), ceasing regional production on channel 5 and moving the entire operations center of Grupo ATV to the Cayma location.

Televisión Continental S.A.C. It moved its tax domicile to Lima; under that company name some ATV Group programs are produced.

Radio Continental continues to broadcast in Arequipa on 740 AM, currently owned by the Arequipa politician, journalist and businessman Marcio Soto Rivera.
