= Valea Aurie =

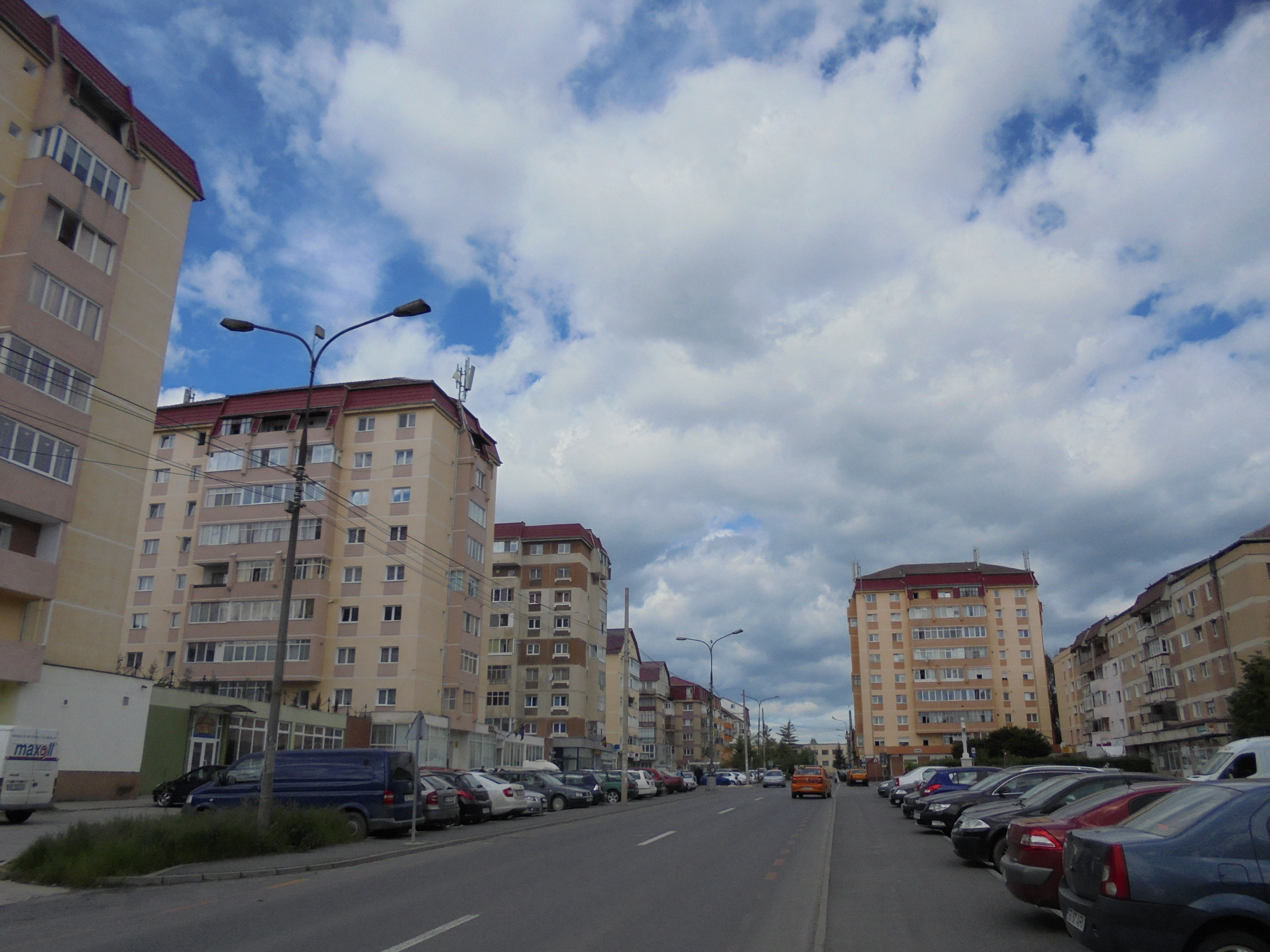
Ludoș Street, Valea Aurie district

Valea Aurie is a residential district of Sibiu, Romania, situated in the south-western part of the city.

The name of the district was given by an inn with the same name, that was located in this region.
