= George Puflea =

Austro-hungarian early aviator

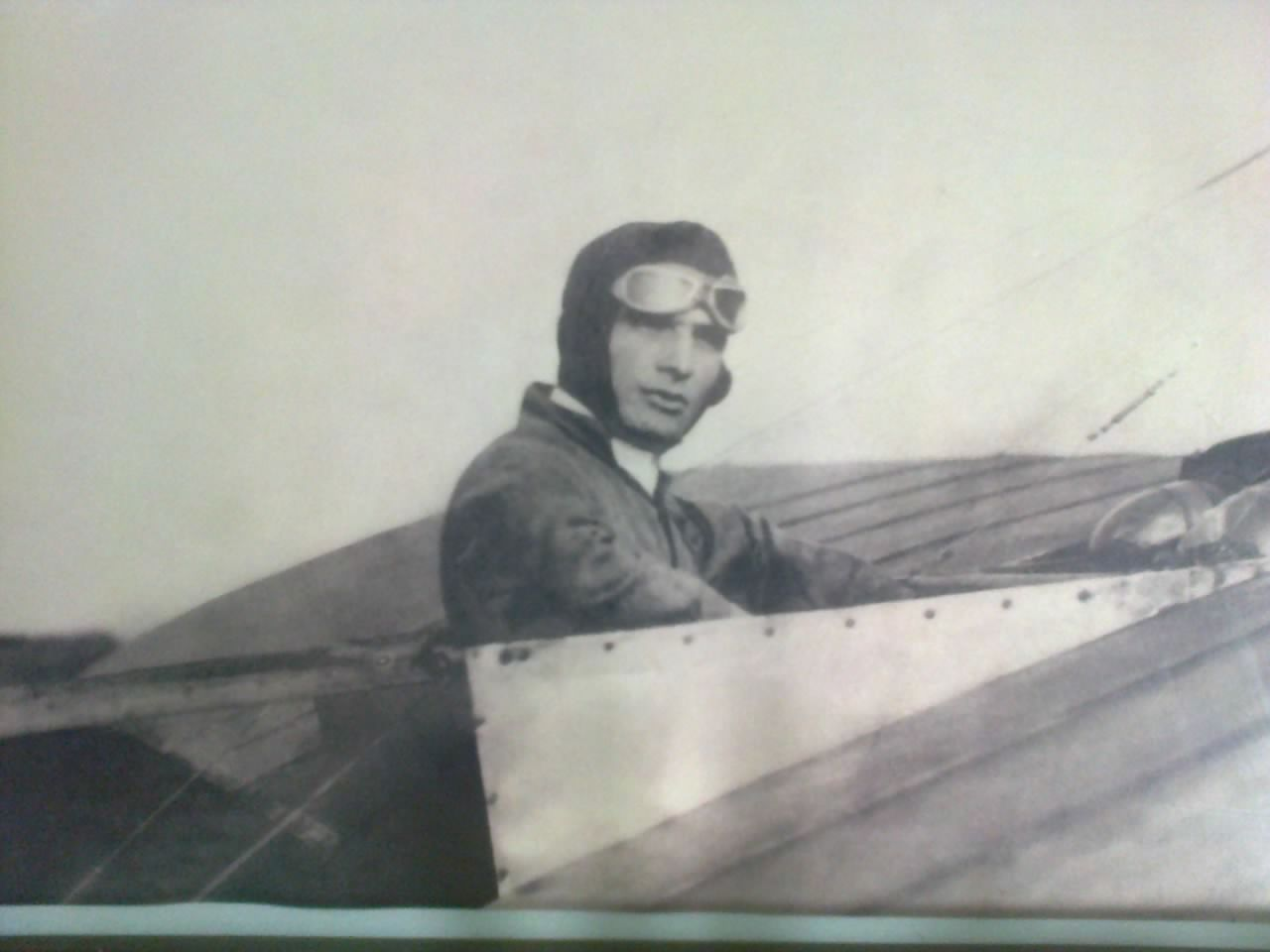
George Puflea aboard a Blériot XI

George Puflea Crăciun was an early aviator. Born in modern-day Romania, he flew in the First Balkan War, in the Mexican Revolution, in the First World War and in early American and Mexican civil aviation. He was also known under his name in Spanish, Jorge Puflea.

== Biography ==
Puflea was born in 1883 in Mediaș, in the Austro-Hungarian Nagy-Küküllő County (in present-day Romania). He became an aviator in France, and took part in the First Balkan War. With Francisco Santarini he traveled to New York City, United States, where he obtained the aviator license number 256 from the Aero Club of America in 1913 at the Moisant Aviation School in Long Island, New York, where he also worked as chief pilot and instructor.

In 1914 he traveled to Mexico invited by Alberto Salinas Carranza, and joined the Constitutionalist Army, fighting in the Puebla campaign and in the Battle of El Ebano, where he carried out observation and bombarding missions, and propaganda distribution activities over enemy troops. He also fought in the Campeche and Yucatán campaign in 1915, in the Battle of Blanca Flor, amongst others. There he also performed exhibition flights.

He was founding instructor of the Escuela Nacional de Aviación, later renamed as Escuela Militar de Aviación of the Mexican Air Force when it was founded, on November 15, 1915. In 1916, he traveled to Europe, where he took part in World War I.

After that war, he moved to El Paso, Texas, United States, where he distributed Ansaldo and Lincoln aircraft. He also lived in Ciudad Juárez and in Chihuahua, Mexico, where he worked as pilot for the State Government. In multiple occasions he tried to establish a regular air flight service between El Paso, Chihuahua and Mexico City, however it is unknown if the service started operations, or the commercial success it might have had.

In 1925, he tried to set a non-stop flight record in Mexico, between the cities of Chihuahua and Mexico City, accompanied by Eddie Stinson. It is not clear if he succeeded setting that record.

He married the Mexican Juliana Treviño González, sister of the General Jacinto B. Treviño, who was the Commander in Chief of the Northeast Army Corps, under whose command he served in the El Ébano combats. With her he had two sons, Jorge Luis Alfonso and Roberto Francisco.

Later, he held different positions in the Aviation affairs of the public administration. During the thirties he was an air services inspector, and assistant to the Commander of the Mexico City Central Airport. In the forties he was also Commander of the Veracruz air field. Once retired, he moved to Albuquerque, New Mexico, where he died, during the early sixties.

In some publications his surname is spelled Pufflea, Paflea, or Buflea.

== Armed conflicts he served in ==
- George Puflea was a pilot during the First Balkan War, with the Austro-Hungarian Army.
- He served in the Mexican Revolution with the Air Fleet of the Northeast Army Corps of the Constitutionalist Army.
- In World War I, he fought in the Austrian Army, on the Russian and Italian fronts.

== Career as instructor ==
- Puflea was chief pilot and instructor in the Moisant Aviation School in New York State during 1913-1914.
- Also, between 1915 and 1916 he was founding instructor of the Escuela Nacional de Aviación, later renamed as Escuela Militar de Aviación of the Mexican Air Force.
- During the First World War, between 1917 and 1919 Puflea was flight and aerobatics instructor in Park Field, Memphis, Tennessee.
- During the Second World War, he was instructor of the Escuela Militar de Aviación, the "Air Force Academy" in Guadalajara, Mexico.

== Records ==
- George Puflea was, with Leonard Bonney, the first instructor that taught in the Escuela Nacional de Aviación, later renamed as Escuela Militar de Aviación of the Mexican Air Force, at the time of its foundation on 15 of November 1915.
- Puflea achieved what is recognised as the first long range flight in Mexico, flying from El Paso, Texas to Mexico City, stopping over in the cities of Chihuahua, Torreon, Saltillo, Monterrey, San Luis Potosí (or maybe Querétaro) in November 1920. This was also the first flight between the United States and Mexico.
- He was also the first pilot that, on January 1, 1921, flew from Mexico City to Tampico in the first test flight of the then incipient Compañía Mexicana de Transportación Aérea, later renamed Mexicana de Aviación, which was the first airline in Mexico with scheduled flights for passenger and postal services.
- Puflea attempted a record non stop distance flight, between the cities of Chihuahua and Mexico City, in June 1925. The results of the mission remain unknown.

== Flight partners ==
- Leonard Bonney. He flew with George Puflea during the El Ebano Battle. He was also his fellow instructor in the Mexican Escuela Nacional de Aviación.
- Edward F. Niles. Partner of Puflea in the Campeche and Yucatán Campaign in 1915.
- Alberto Salinas Carranza. Supervisor and flight partner of Puflea in the Air Fleet of the Constitucionalist Army. He was also his commander in the Escuela Nacional de Aviación.
- Edward "Eddie" Stinson. Accompanied Puflea in his record non stop distance attempt Chihuahua – Mexico City, in 1925.
- L. A. Winship. Winship accompanied Puflea in the first United States – Mexico flight, in 1920. Some other sources cite Gardner as Puflea's partner in this flight.
