= Emilio Carranza =

Mexican aviator (1905–1928)

- Carranza in the 1920s
- Born: December 9, 1905; Ramos Arizpe, Coahuila, Mexico
- Died: July 12, 1928 (aged 22); Tabernacle Township, New Jersey, U.S.
- Cause of death: Plane crash
- Burial place: Panteón de Dolores, Mexico City

Captain Emilio Carranza Rodríguez (December 9, 1905 – July 12, 1928), was a Mexican aviator and national hero, nicknamed the "Lindbergh of Mexico". He died on the return part of a historic goodwill flight from Mexico City to the United States. He crashed in New Jersey shortly after take-off from New York.

== Early life and background ==
Carranza was born in Villa Ramos Arizpe, Coahuila, Mexico, on December 9, 1905. His father was Sebastian Carranza who was an attache at the Mexican consulate in New York. His mother was Maria Dolores Rodriguez Gomez. As a child he lived for some time in San Antonio, El Paso, and Mexico City. He was fluent in English. He attended the Military Academy at Mexico City and graduated in 1924 with honors. He married Maria Luisa Corbala in 1928 four months before taking the flight to the USA. Following his death, He left a wife and unborn child. The child, Emilio Carranza Jr. was born after his crash. The child died at age 6 of an appendicitis. He was the great-nephew of President Venustiano Carranza of Mexico and his elder second cousin was Mexican aviator Alberto Salinas Carranza, whom he called "uncle." At age 18, he took part against the Yaqui rebellion in Sonora and helped to put down the de la Huerta rebellion.

== Aviation career ==
=== Aviation records ===
Carranza was known to have set a number of aviation records. In 1927 he made the first non-stop flight from Mexico City to Ciudad Juárez (1200 miles). While in Sonora, he crashed and his face had to be reassembled with platinum screws. At age 22, on May 24–25, 1928, he set the record for the third-longest non-stop solo flight by flying 1,575 miles (3000 km) from San Diego, California, to Mexico City in 18.5 hours. His safe arrival completed the longest non-stop flight by a Mexican. He was greeted by Plutarco Calles, then President of Mexico.

=== US Goodwill Flight ===
==== Washington DC ====
In 1928, he became a national hero when he was selected to undertake a goodwill flight from Valbuena Airfield in Mexico City to Washington, D.C., in response to the previous year's flight between the two capitals by Charles Lindbergh. He received the airplane on May 20 from the factory. After a number of short practice flights in Tampico, to test gasoline and maintaining altitude, Emilio was ready for his distance flight. Flying his plane The Mexico Excelsior, a Ryan Brougham similar to the Spirit of St. Louis, Carranza reached Washington, D.C., on June 12, 1928, after a forced landing in Mooresville, North Carolina due to fog.

The goodwill flight was partially financed by Charles Lindbergh who contributed $1,200. The American Syrian Federation also contributed financial assistance to pay for the flight. However, the bulk of the money for the good-will flight came from a public collection of $25,000 in Mexico.

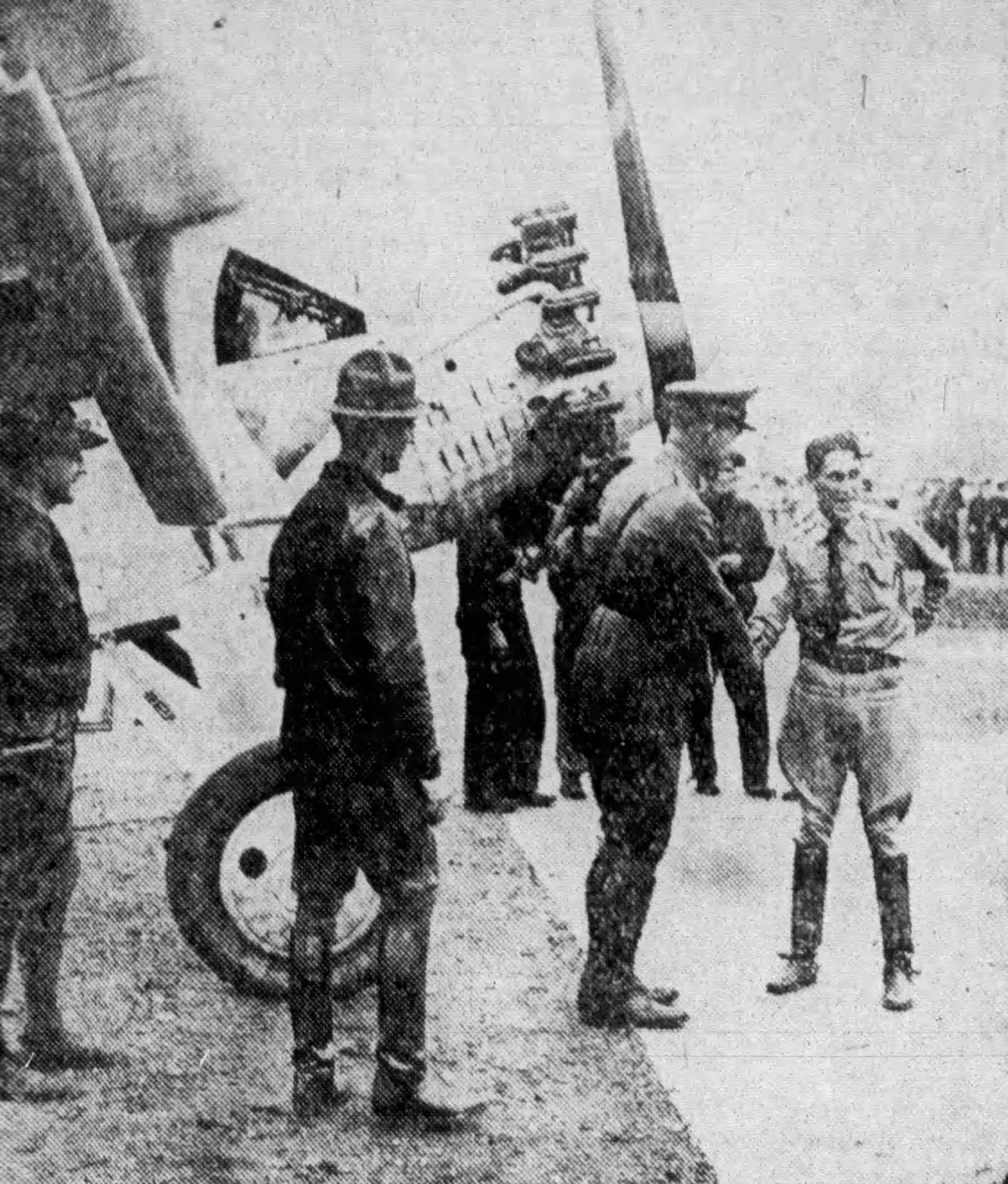
Carranza being greeted by Major H. C. Davidson at Bolling Field

At Bolling Field, he was greeted by Acting Secretary of State Robert Olds, Mexican Ambassador Miguel Téllez, other dignitaries and spectators. The next day, he had lunch with U.S. President Calvin Coolidge, who hosted the aviator at the Pan American Union. According to The New York Times, the two had to have lunch there because The White House larder was empty due to the first family's impending departure for a vacation. While in Washington, he placed a wreath on the Tomb of the Unknown Soldier.

==== New York ====
Flying to New York, he was escorted by an air squadron from Bolling Field. Carranza landed at Roosevelt Field on Long Island. A crowd of people, 200 soldiers, 12 motorcycle policemen, and a military band were on hand to greet him. He was honored in New York City by Secretary of Commerce Herbert Hoover and New York City mayor Jimmy Walker. Mayor Walker gave him the key to the city. Mayor Walker also later invited Carranza to a firemen's ceremony where he requested Carranza do the honor of presenting medals to the firefighters for their heroic work. He was honored at a lunch at the Garden City Hotel given by the Nassau County official Reception Committee. A luncheon was also held at the Bankers Club for Carranza and 200 guests given by the Mexican Chamber of Commerce.

He then flew to West Point where he also reviewed the troops, an honor infrequently given to a visiting official with the rank of just Captain. When at West Point, he presented a picture of the Mexican Military Academy at Chapultepec. Following West Point, he flew to Lowell, Massachusetts, to dedicate a new field there. He went at the request of Edith Nourse Rogers who was responsible for the lifting of an embargo of aviation products to Mexico. He then returned to New York City.

He was also honored at a reception given by the American Syrian Federation in Brooklyn. At the reception, he was given a wrist watch and a scroll offering good wishes. He stated at the dinner that Mexican Syrians had contributed a third of the money to pay for the expenses of his flight. He was also honored with a luncheon on Governors Island and then that evening was honored at a dance at Hotel McAlpin. Those in attendance at the Luncheon were his father Sebastian Carranza, General Pedro Caloca, Robert Lee Bullard, and Hugh A. Drum among others. Due to violent weather, he was urged to remain in New York by Charles Lindbergh and others.

==== Return flight and crash ====
Carranza took off after dark during a break in thunderstorms in the New York region. He reported before taking off that he would fly towards Washington and then steer a compass course from there. While flying over the Pinelands of southern New Jersey amidst thunderstorms, he crashed in the woods. Investigators from Fort Monmouth conducted the accident probe to determine what happened. They were able to determine the engine throttle was closed and the spark lever was in the advanced position. This showed he was attempting to land.

John H. Carr, and his family were out picking huckleberries when they discovered his body and the wreckage the next day. His corpse was wrapped in canvas from the plane's fuselage and taken to a garage behind Buzby's General Store in Chatsworth where it was placed in a makeshift coffin. His casket, accompanied by United States Army officers, was draped with an American flag from Mount Holly Post 11 of the American Legion, and then taken to New York City. The flag hangs today in Mexico's School of Aviation. Many personal assets were looted from the crash site during the investigation. Three days later some medals, rings and clothing were turned into the local police. These items were eventually turned over to the airman's family. The Mexican government rewarded John Carr with $500 (approximately equivalent to $9,000 in 2024) for finding and quickly reporting the location of the plane and body.

There is a story that on July 12 Carranza received a telegram from Mexican War Minister Joaquín Amaro ordering his immediate return to Mexico City "or the quality of your manhood will be in doubt." According to the legend, the telegram was found at the crash site in the pocket of the aviator's flight jacket, but the telegram no longer exists. The story's proponents do not cite any primary source that confirms the telegram's existence.

Contemporary news reports contradict the story. According to the July 13 edition of The New York Times, Carranza departed after receiving a report via telegram from the US Weather Bureau, but it is unclear whether the weather report prompted his departure. Airport officials said he announced a delay so that spectators would leave the field. There was also an unsubstantiated statement from Senator Thomas Heflin that there was a report of a plot to kill Carranza.

Authorities initially identified Carranza's body from the Weather Bureau telegram found in his flight jacket pocket, according to news reports. Authorities described to reporters the belongings found on his body, but made no reference to a telegram from Minister Amaro. The news reports are contrary to the Amaro telegram story published on the 50th anniversary of the aviator's death, which states that the Minister's telegram was found in Carranza's jacket pocket.

==== Body repatriation and final resting place ====
United States President Coolidge offered the battleship Florida to return the body. President Calles of Mexico, declined the offer and the body was returned to Mexico via train transport amid full military honors. The military guard were dispatched from Governors Island. When transferred to the train at Penn Station, the coffin was led by six black horses in a caisson with 10,000 troops marching to a muffled drum beat down Broadway. It was estimated that 200,000 people lined the route to see the coffin draped procession. Every Mexican military officer was ordered to wear crape on his sword hilt and a black brassard on his arm in honor of Carranza. National flags were flown at half-staff for a week.

Carranza's remains were interred at the Rotunda of Illustrious Persons in a procession of 100,000 marchers. Military officers linked arms to keep clear the view for the family. An airplane formation flew overhead. He was posthumously promoted to General.

In 1929, Edward T. M. Carr, Superintendent of the Southern Division of the Long Branch Railroad, on a goodwill tour, stopped in Mexico City to deliver to Mexico City officials a pine tree from the scene of the crash. It was planted adjacent to his grave site.

== Legacy ==
=== Carranza memorial ===
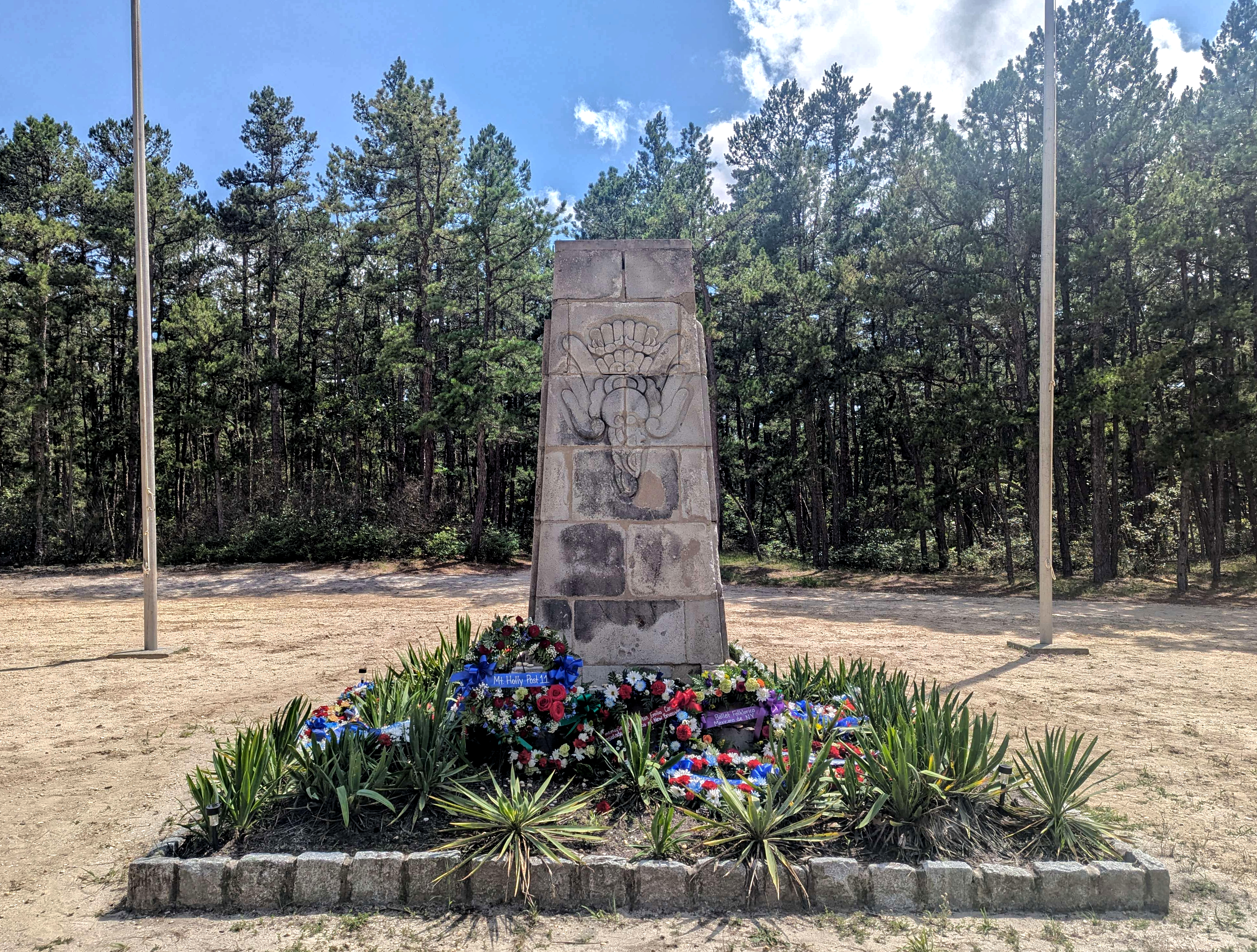
The Tabernacle, New Jersey, Carranza memorial during the annual ceremony in 2025

In 1931, a 12 ft (3.6 m) monument in the Wharton State Forest in Tabernacle Township, New Jersey was erected, and marks the site of his crash 39°46′38.6″N 74°37′56.6″W. The monument was installed with funds donated by Mexican schoolchildren and depicts a falling eagle of Aztec design. Each year in July, on the Saturday nearest the anniversary of his crash (second Saturday in July) at 1:00 p.m. he is honored at the monument site by members of the American Legion Medford post 526 accompanied by an entourage from the Mexican consulates in New York City and Philadelphia. Originally drawing thousands, attendance at the annual memorial has been reduced to a smaller gathering of people.

The donated monolith was created with each side representing a symbol of Carranza and his love of aviation. The monument was funded by the children of Mexico who saved their coins to create this obelisk-looking statue. The stones for the monument were quarried from granite mined near his home and each block represented a different Mexican State.

Constructed in the form of a giant pylon, with squared tapered sides, the image of an Aztec eagle is carved on one side. On the other side, there is an arrow, pointing skyward. Another side has an inscription. It shows some deterioration and some letters in the message are missing. The message states "Messenger of Peace... The (p)eople of Mexico Hope that your high ideal(s) will be rea(l)ized... Homage of the children of Mexico to the aviator captain Emilio Carranza who died tragically on July 13, 1928 in his good will flight". In the final side, there are embedded footprints which represent the famed aviator's final walk on the planet. The Monument was crafted and shipped from Mexico.

=== Additional memorials ===
A memorial was planned near the spot where Carranza landed in Mooresville, North Carolina, during his flight to Washington D.C. A committee was established to design the memorial. However, the memorial was never built.

=== Annual ceremony ===
There is an annual ceremony for Carranza held at the Air Force Academy in Mexico City.

=== Carranza Memorial Park ===
Following the crash in 1928, a small marker was placed where the aviator's body was found. Following the monument placement in 1931, a park was created to memorialize the aviator in 1933. The park originally comprised 10 acres. However, it was absorbed into Wharton State Forrest. There is a monument sign close to the monument which state:s "Monument - Captain Emilio Carranza fell to his death while returning to Mexico on a good will flight in 1928. Pennies of Mexican Children".

Introduced June 24, 1999, by Senator Leonard T. Connors Jr and Diane Allen Senate bill No. 2025 establishes the "Emilio Carranza Memorial Commission"; it additionally appropriates $95,000. The focus of the bill was to primarily provide for the restoration and maintenance of the Emilio Carranza memorial monument.

On July 8, 2005, the memorial which was vandalized was restored. Two men were charged in connection to the monument vandalization which was spray-painted in May 2005 with "white power" and "Die all Wetbacks". There was also a swastika. The work was performed by T. Scott Kreilick, whose Pennsylvania-based conservation company have also restored headstones at the U.S. Military Academy at West Point and New York City's botanical garden.

In 2007, documentary filmmaker Dr Robert A. Emmons Jr. completed and premiered a feature-length documentary (Goodwill: The Flight of Emilio Carranza) which detailed the life of Carranza and the role of the American Legion Post 11 as well as the town of Chatsworth, New Jersey's involvement in his recovery and memorial. According to Emmons Jr: "Goodwill, the documentary film, presents Carranza's life and the legacy he has left in both Mexico and the United States of America. The film goes further as it investigates the differences between Carranza's legacy in these two nations brought on by social, political, and historical factors. Finally, the film is meant to bring another layer to Carranza and Lindbergh's goal of establishing a lasting goodwill between these two nations."

In April 2009, J&J Video Producers of Chicago premiered their documentary film titled "FLYING WITH EMILIO". The documentary details the life of Emilio Carranza and the continued role of the American Legion Post 11 of Mount Holly, NJ's involvement in his recovery and their annual Memorial Service.

On July 11, 2015, the 87th annual Tribute was attended by Commander of the Mexican Air Force, Lt. Gen. Carlos Antonio Rodriguez-Munguia and Maj. Gen. Victor Aguirre-Serna who presented a wreath. A portrait and model of his airplane were on display during the ceremony.

=== Postage stamps ===
A year following his death Mexico issued in July 1929 commemorative postage stamps to mark Emilio Carranza's Goodwill Flight: 20c brown and blue black, 50c brown red & blue black, 1p blue black & brown, 5c olive green & black, 10c black & brown red, and 5c violet & dark green stamps.

For the 20th anniversary in July 1947, Mexico issued a 10 peso commemorative stamp.

On the 50th anniversary of his death in August 1978, Mexico issued an Air Mail stamp.
