= Michael Weiß (politician) =

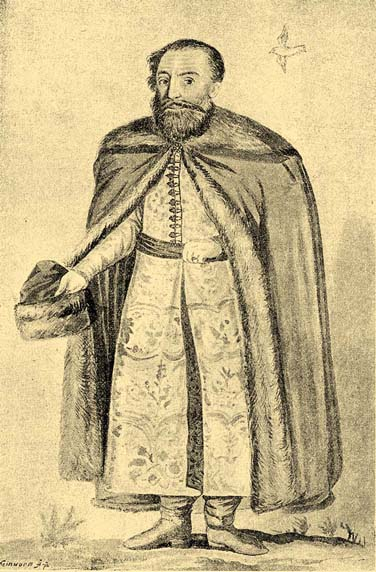
Michael Weiss—17th century drawing

Michael Weiß (also spelled Michael Weiss, born in 1569, in Medgyes (German: Mediasch, today Mediaș, Romania), deceased 16 October 1612, in Barcaföldvár (German: Marienburg, today Feldioara, Romania) was a Transylvanian Saxon politician and historian. He is mostly known for being the mayor of Brassó (German: Kronstadt, modern-day Brașov, Romania).

== Biography ==
He was born in Medgyes as the son of mayor Johannes Weiß and his wife, Gertrude Wolf, both of whom would die of the plague in 1586. He went to the local elementary school, then, in 1583, aged 14, he attended the courses of the Jesuit school of Kolozsvár (German: Klausenburg, today Cluj-Napoca, Romania). During the two years spent there, Weiß learned Hungarian and progressed enough as to be able to write poems in this language.

Shortly, he began his political career as secretary of Count Ferdinand von Hardeck (Ferdinand Graf zu Hardegg, or Hardeck), the imperial commander of Szathmár, and then by working for the Hungarian chancellor office in Prague. He was noticed by Emperor Rudolf II, who ennobled him in 1589, at age 20.

In 1590 he returned to Transylvania. He became a member of the Assembly of the one hundred in 1591, and in 1594 was chosen to represent Brassó in the Transylvanian Diet (the political and constitutional organ of the principality). In 1600 he became a member of the city Senate. As representative and senator of Brassó, the voivodes István Bocskay, Sigismund Rákóczi and those of the Báthory family sent Weiß in several diplomatic missions, including to domnitor Radu Șerban of Wallachia.

Michael Weiss described Șerban as being "wealthy, cunning, and very skilled in the craft of war". In 1606, the Wallachian prince invited him to take part in several hunting and fishing trips for two weeks. During this time it appears they have discussed political issues of common interest, the results of which will be seen five years later.

When Gabriel Báthory wanted to subdue Brassó, Weiss led the resistance fight, having as ally Șerban. On October 16, 1612, a battle took place at Barcaföldvár, in which the Brassó army was defeated. Weiss was caught and killed. He was beheaded and his head was taken to Nagyszeben (German: Hermannstadt, today Sibiu, Romania) and presented to Gabriel Báthory as proof of victory.

== Legacy ==
=== In memoriam ===
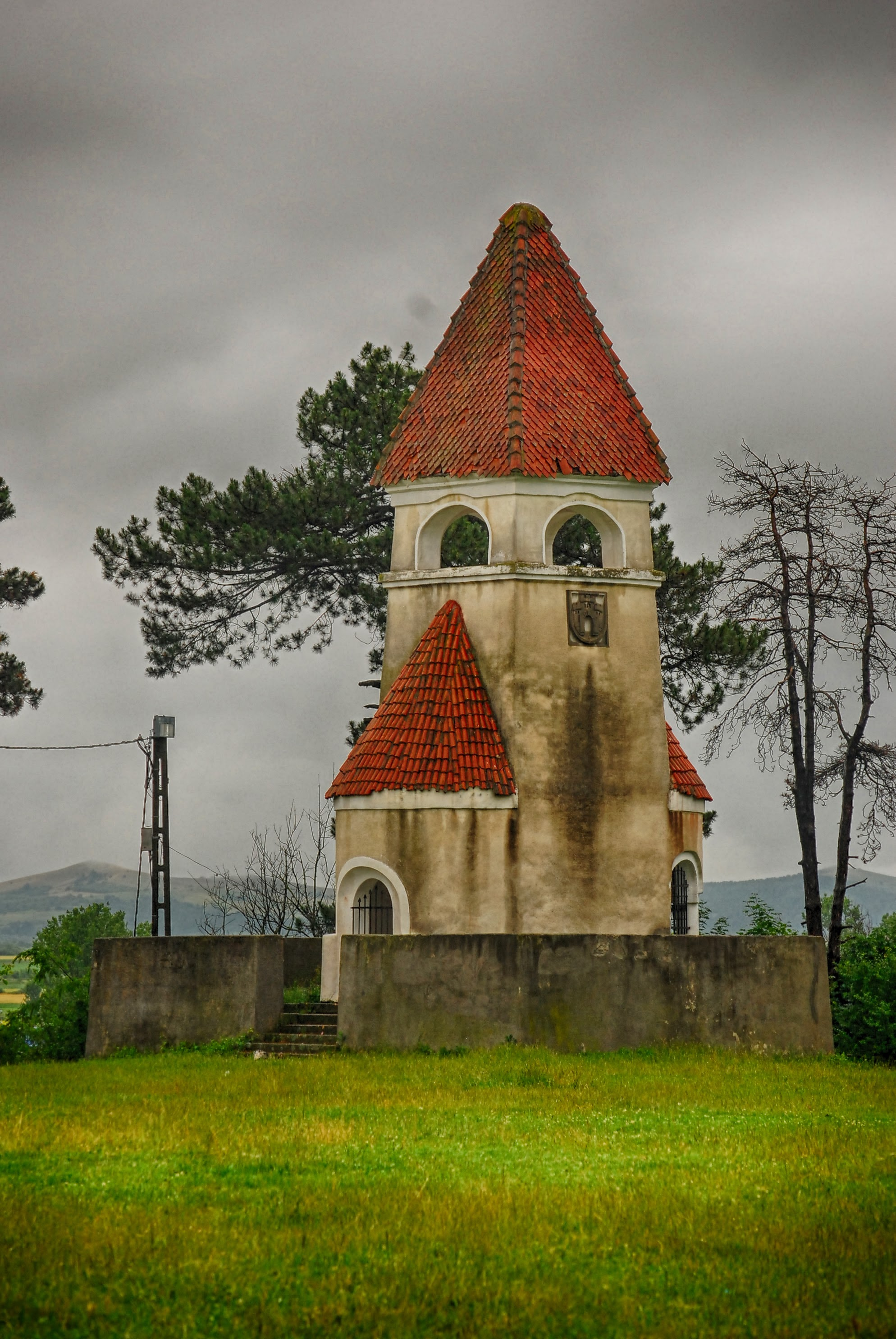
Monument to the Saxon students fallen in 1612 in Feldioara

In 1887, Nonnengasse (Nun Alley) was named after its former mayor.

On the list of historical monuments created by the Ministry of Culture, at number 976, code LMI 2004 BV-IV-m-A-11919, is The Monument of Saxon Students fallen in Battle in 1612. Built between 1912 and 1913, it commemorates the 39 young students that died near Barcaföldvár during the battle where Weiss lost his life.

After 1989, DFDR Brașov has reinstated the tradition of commemorating and honouring predecessors through a celebration at the forementioned monument.

=== Literary works ===
Besides the poems written in his youth, Michael Weiß has left behind a few writings of importance with regard to his contemporary Brassó and Transylvania.

- Liber annalium raptim scriptus per Mich. Weyss Mediensem, senatorem Republicae Coronensis, translatable as "The book of haste chronicles by Michael Weiß of Medgyes, Senator of the Republic of Brassó", a journal later published by Eugen von Trauschenfels, with a preface signed by A. Kurz.
- Brevis consignatio tumultum bellicorum ab anno Chr. 1610, usque completum annum 1613 ambitione et inquietudine Gabrielis Báthori Principis motorum, translatable as "Brief writings of the tumultuous war of 1610, then added in 1613 by ambition and restlessness of Prince Gabriel Báthori", with an anonymous addition to the events of 1613.

It is also worth mentioning that all the documents of the Weiß family have been donated to the patrimony of Johannes Honterus high-school of Brassó.
