= Trausch =

Trausch is a German surname, which is a variant of Trauschke, and derived from the Old Slavic drugu, meaning "companion". Notable people with the surname include:

- Pierre Trausch (b.1937), Luxembourgian, former Vice President of CGFP
- Gilbert Trausch (1931–2018), Luxembourgian, Historian
- Dominique Trausch (1900-1945), Luxembourgian, Catholic Priest and Martyr
- Eugen von Trauschenfels (1833–1903), Austro-Hungarian writer

== See also ==
- Stade François Trausch, a football stadium in Mamer, Luxembourg
