= Paul Traugott Meissner =

Austrian chemist (1778–1864)

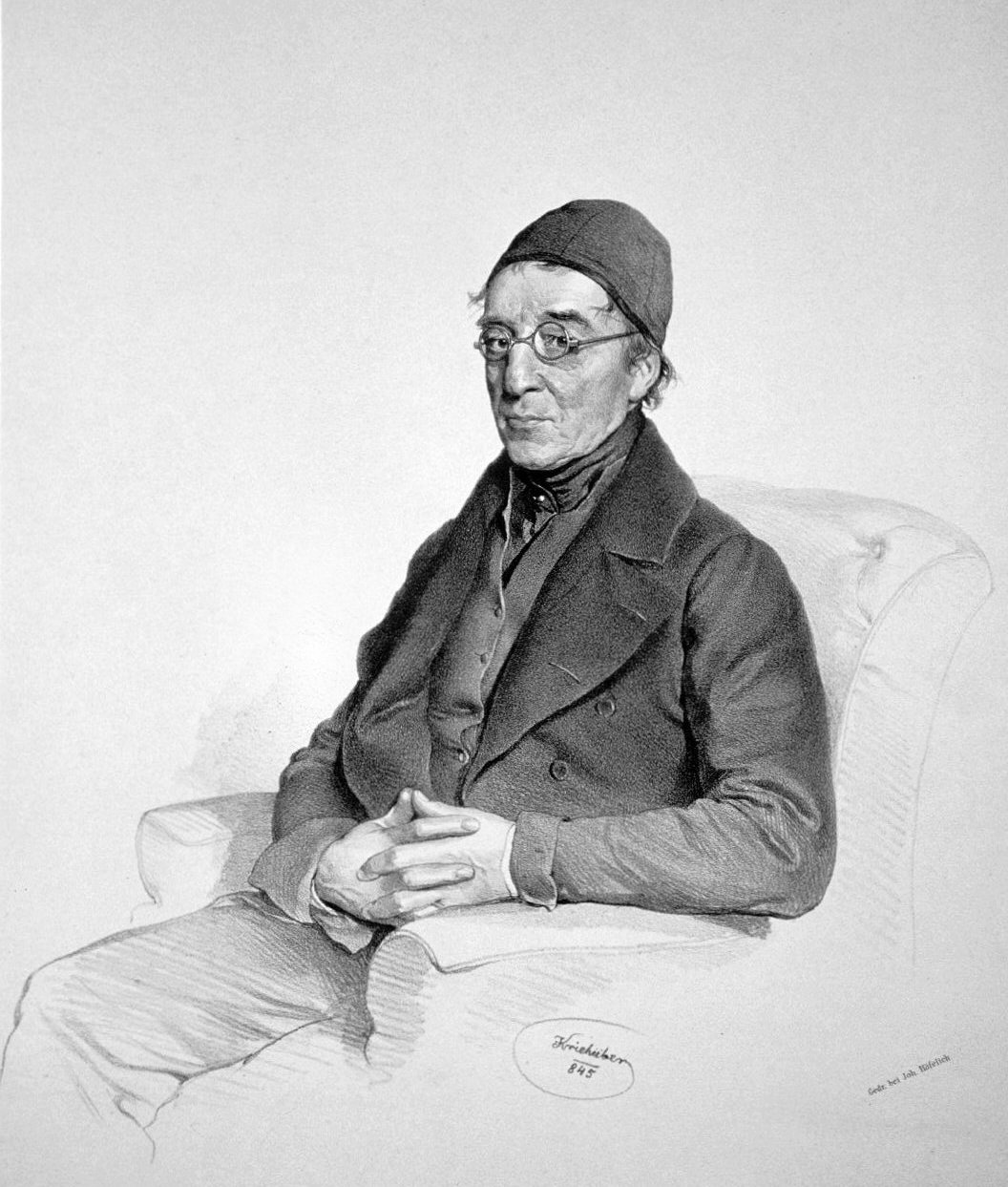
Paul Traugott Meissner, lithograph by Josef Kriehuber (1845)

Paul Traugott Meissner (23 March 1778, Mediasch, Transylvania – 9 July 1864) was an Austrian chemist.

In 1797 he moved to Vienna, where he attended lectures given by Joseph Franz von Jacquin (1766-1839). Later, he continued his studies on a tour through Germany. He earned a degree as magister of pharmacy from the University of Pest, subsequently returning to Transylvania, where he took over management of a pharmacy in Kronstadt.

Beginning in 1815 he served as an adjunct at the newly founded Polytechnic Institute in Vienna, where shortly afterwards, he became a professor of technical chemistry. In 1842 he was appointed director of the department of general chemistry.

Best known for his research in the field of heating technology, he is credited with development of a hot-air central heating system. He conducted experiments with heating systems for steamships and railway carriages and also created a fuel-efficient cooking range. In 1820, Meissner's air heating system was tried out at a sugar refinery in Vienna.

Described as a free thinker, Meissner was known for his controversial views that made adversaries out of contemporaries that included Vienna technologist Johann Joseph von Prechtl (1778-1854). German chemist Justus Liebig (1803-1873) specifically blamed Meissner for what he perceived was the plight of Austrian chemistry. Since 1910, the Meißnergasse in the Donaustadt district of Vienna has been named in his honor.
