= Bernetta Adams Miller =

American aviator

Bernetta Adams Miller (January 11, 1884 – November 30, 1972) was a pioneering woman aviator who was the fifth licensed woman pilot in the United States. She led a colorful life including winning a Croix de Guerre in World War I and being one of the people standing between Albert Einstein and the public at the Institute for Advanced Study in Princeton, New Jersey.

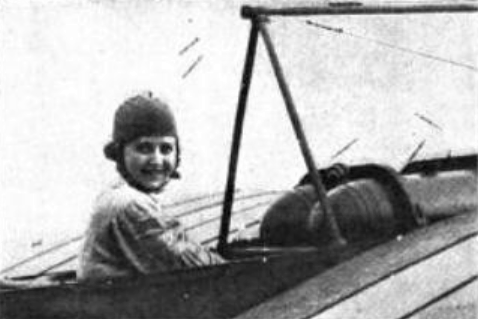
Bernetta Miller in 1912 in Bleriot XI.

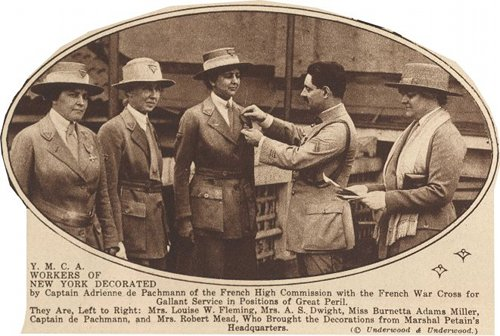

== Early life ==
Bernetta Miller was born in Canton, Ohio. Her family lived for a time in Nebraska, but soon moved to the Finger Lakes region of New York state where she briefly attended the State Normal School at Geneseo. She dropped out when her father's business failed, and they returned to Canton, where she attended Canton Actual Business College where she studied bookkeeping. She then moved to New York City.

== Aviation ==
In New York, she became interested in aviation and took flying lessons in 1912 from the Moisant aviation school in Mineola, Long Island. Miller's apprenticeship was on the Hempstead Plains aviation field. She received her license on September 16, 1912, becoming the fifth woman in the U.S. to hold a pilot's license (she held Aero Club of America license number 173). During her flight tests by moonlight, the New York Times reported

Critics here regard her license fly as remarkable. The trial called for an altitude of only 150 feet, and she rose to 600. In the landing test, she was expected to touch the ground within 164 feet of a designated object, and she made the spot within 20 feet.

The Moisant company used her as a demonstration pilot for the Blériot monoplanes that they were building under license. She was the pilot chosen to demonstrate the Moisant-Blériot monoplane to the United States Army at College Park, Maryland on October 7, 1912. She wrote of it, much later

Of course, I had no illusions as to why I was sent to College Park to demonstrate the monoplane to the U.S. government officials who were exclusively devoted to the idea of the biplane. ... The Moisant apparently calculated that I could overcome some of the fears others might have of the monoplane. I suppose that this was on the basis of the idea that if a mere woman could learn to fly one, so surely could a man.

This was apparently the first demonstration of a monoplane to the U.S. government. In a special edition, the New York Times reported on Miller's insistence on flying despite the recent death of two military aviators, Lt. Rockwell and Cpl. Scott, at College Park. On September 29, 1912, the newspaper quoted her as saying

I am not here to do fancy flying, but simply to show the people of Washington that the monoplane is a better machine than the biplane. I will not fly until after the funeral of the two men who were killed. I think it would be disrespectful. My ambition is to become a great cross-country flier. I am not flying to achieve fame as a fancy flier or an exhibition flier, but to show women that the aeroplane is practical when it is asked to do only what it is physically possible to do.

On January 20, 1913 at Garden City, New York she attempted a women's altitude record, but had to return to ground when an oil gauge broke and oil obscured her vision. With increasing disapproval of women flying after the death of Harriet Quimby, and suffering financial difficulties, she gave up aviation soon after.

== World War I ==
Bernetta went to the front in World War I as a volunteer for the YMCA. She delivered food to the troops of the 326th Infantry of the 82nd Division as a canteen worker, frequently under fire. She was wounded at least once, but remained at the front through the Argonne offensive and to the end of the war. In 1919 she was awarded the Croix de Guerre by the French government. Her commendation read

Assigned to Tours at the beginning of 1918 and then sent to the Toul sector in June 1918, she rendered the biggest services before and during the offensive of Saint-Mihiel, serving and helping the injured in the advanced aid stations. She was in the sector of the Argonne during this last offensive.

In a letter of commendation from the command of the 82nd Division on 13 January 1919 it was said that

While operating her canteen near the front line, at Noviant, France, on the night of August 4, 1918, Miss Miller was under heavy enemy fire, where she served hot chocolate and other supplies to the men, when it was impossible for these supplies to be obtained elsewhere. On October 17, 1918, during an attack near St. Juvin, France, under enemy fire, she visited the front lines, carrying a supply of cigarettes and other comforts to the men. By her devotion to duty, disregard of personal danger and untiring energy she did much to maintain a cheerful spirit among the soldiers during a critical time.

== Turkey and after ==
From 1926 to 1933 Bernetta was Bursar of the American College for Girls in Istanbul, Turkey. She resigned that job when a new head of school was appointed whom she disliked, and she returned to the United States. From 1933 to 1941 she was Bursar of St. Mary's Hall, a private school in Burlington, New Jersey.

== The Institute for Advanced Study ==
From 1941 to 1948 she worked at the Institute for Advanced Study in Princeton, New Jersey. She was at first secretary to the director of the Institute and bookkeeper, but when her vision declined owing to cataracts she was made a greeter in the entrance of the Institute. As such, she was one of the people responsible for keeping visitors from disturbing Albert Einstein. After Robert Oppenheimer became head of the Institute, he fired Bernetta. She said of him "I think the man was a complete snake -- but I would never say that he was disloyal."

Her view of Einstein was entirely different. She referred to him as "the dear" and in a 1963 interview said of him:

Of all the men there he was one of the kindest. He loved everybody. He was the nicest, most out-going man. There was nothing petty about him. We all protected him and tried to screen his calls and visitors.

When she was fired Einstein wrote a letter of reference for her.

== Later years ==
After Princeton, Bernetta worked as a housemother in colleges. She was admitted to membership in the Early Birds, an association of aviators who had flown before 1917. She retired to New Hope, Pennsylvania where she died, after breaking her hip in a fall, in November 1972. She is buried in West Lawn Cemetery in Canton, Ohio. Bernetta was a member of the Women's Overseas Service League.

== Museum collections ==
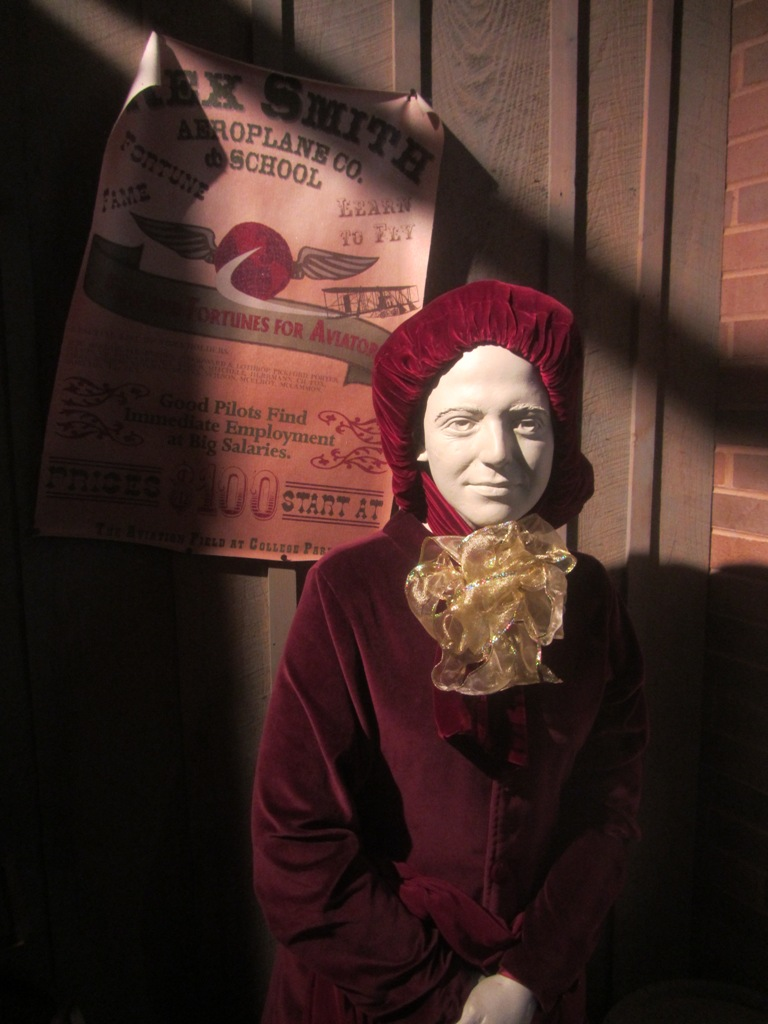
Bernetta Miller's suit in the College Park Aviation Museum

Her 1912 flying suit (actually one made for riding in open automobiles) is on display at the College Park Airport in Maryland. There is a picture of her in the Early Flight room of the National Air and Space Museum in Washington, D.C.

Her pilot's license and Early Bird plaque are in the collection of the Stark County Historical Society, dba McKinley Presidential Library & Museum, in her hometown of Canton, Ohio.

== See also ==
- Sabiha Gökçen, first female combat pilot

== Articles about Bernetta Miller ==
- I. A. Van Dyck. "On the aviation field". The Hempstead Sentinel, issue of late August or early September, 1912, page 5 (mention of Bernetta Miller flight before her license qualification flight).
- "WOMAN INSISTS ON FLYING.; Miss Miller Not Daunted by the Death of Military Aviators." New York Times, September 30, 1912, page 1.
- Bernetta A. Miller. "How I Learned To Fly. One Woman's Nerve-Wracking Experience, Breaking-In a Wild Bucking Monoplane When Aviation Was Still In Its Infancy". The World Magazine (magazine of The New York World), 2 December 1928, page 3.
- Helen Carringer. "Canton's Pioneer Pilot Recalls Busy, Happy Life. Miss Miller Will Give 'Early Bird' Plaque to Stark Historical Society". Canton Repository, Canton, Ohio. 17 February 1963, page 43.
- "Woman Pilot Obtained Wings In 1912 Frequent Visitor Here". Daily Messenger (Canandaigua, New York), 19 March 1963, page 5.
- "Obituary. Bernetta A. Miller". Beacon (Lambertville, New Jersey), 7 December 1972, page 10
- "Bernetta A. Miller, A Pioneer in Flying". New York Times 2 December 1972, page 38
- "Pioneer pilot worked at Wilson College". Alumnae Quarterly (Wilson College, Chambersburg, PA). 1994, page 11 (issue not known). "Reprinted with permission from The Repository, Canton, Ohio, submitted by Carolyn Austin Waltenbaugh '41".
- Kenney, Kimberly A. 2008. Canton's Pioneers in Flight. Arcadia Publishing, Mount Pleasant, South Carolina. (Chapter 5 is on Bernetta Miller).
