= Nova TV (Romania) =

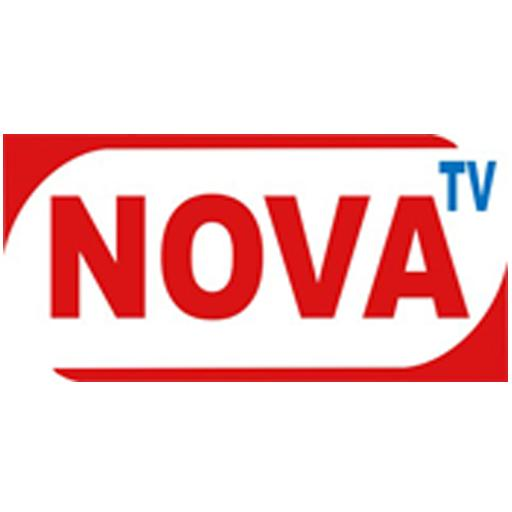
Current logo (2004–present)

Nova TV is a Romanian television channel, set up in Mediaș and it was first released on January 19, 2004, at 17.30. Nova TV is the only local television in the northern area of Sibiu County.

It was released under the title "Televiziunea care te priveşte" (The television who is watching you).

Marius Hihn coordinates the Nova TV team from the start of its broadcast. The chief editor of the local television says that this period has meant continuous progress, but also its own improvement. Currently, the team is made up of several experienced editors - among them Jimmy Ionescu, the developer of the talk show "În linia întâi" (In the first line) and Ada Gheorghe, producer of the "Mediaş 120" show.
