= Mediaș =

Mediaș Mediasch (German)
- Municipality
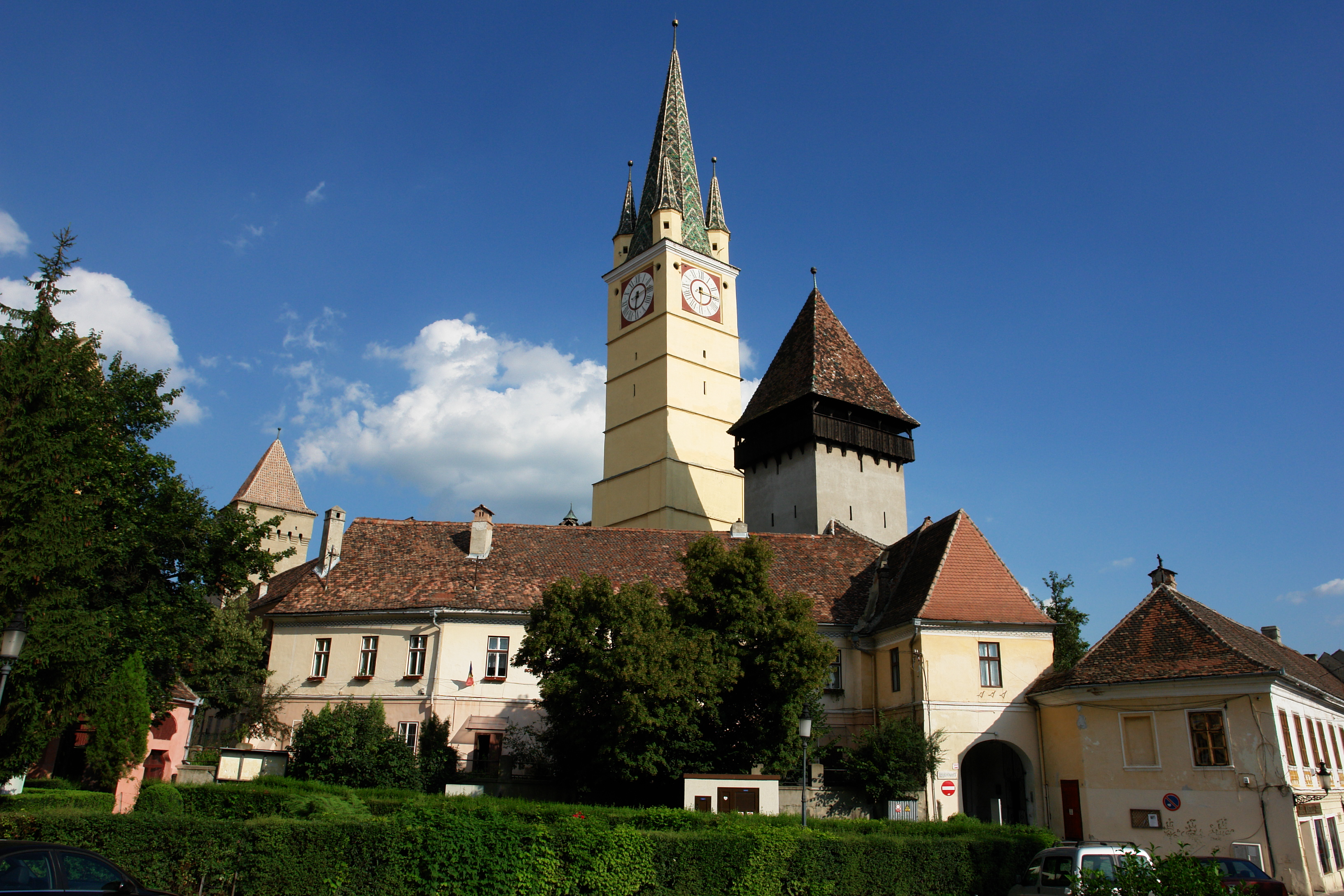
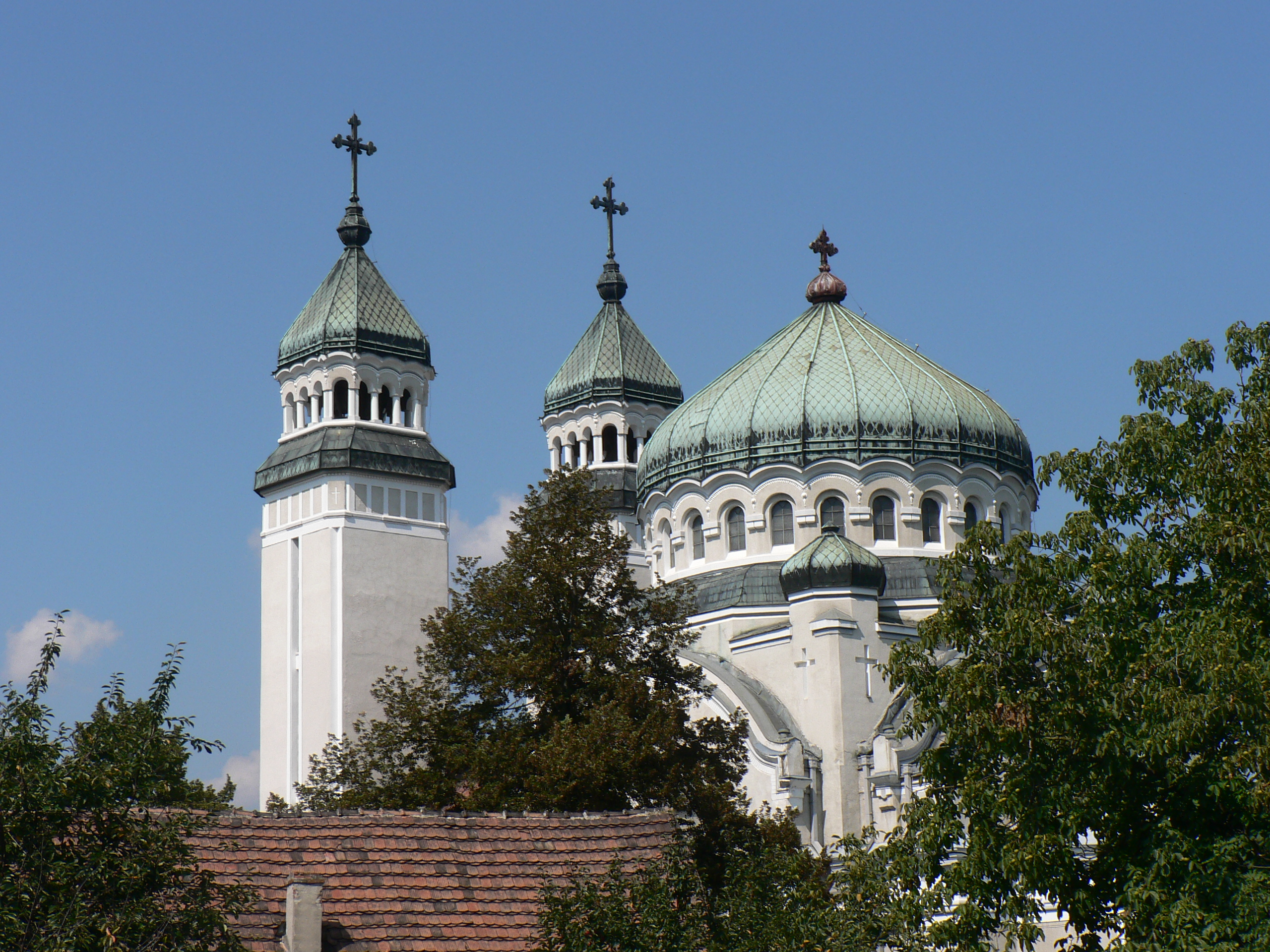
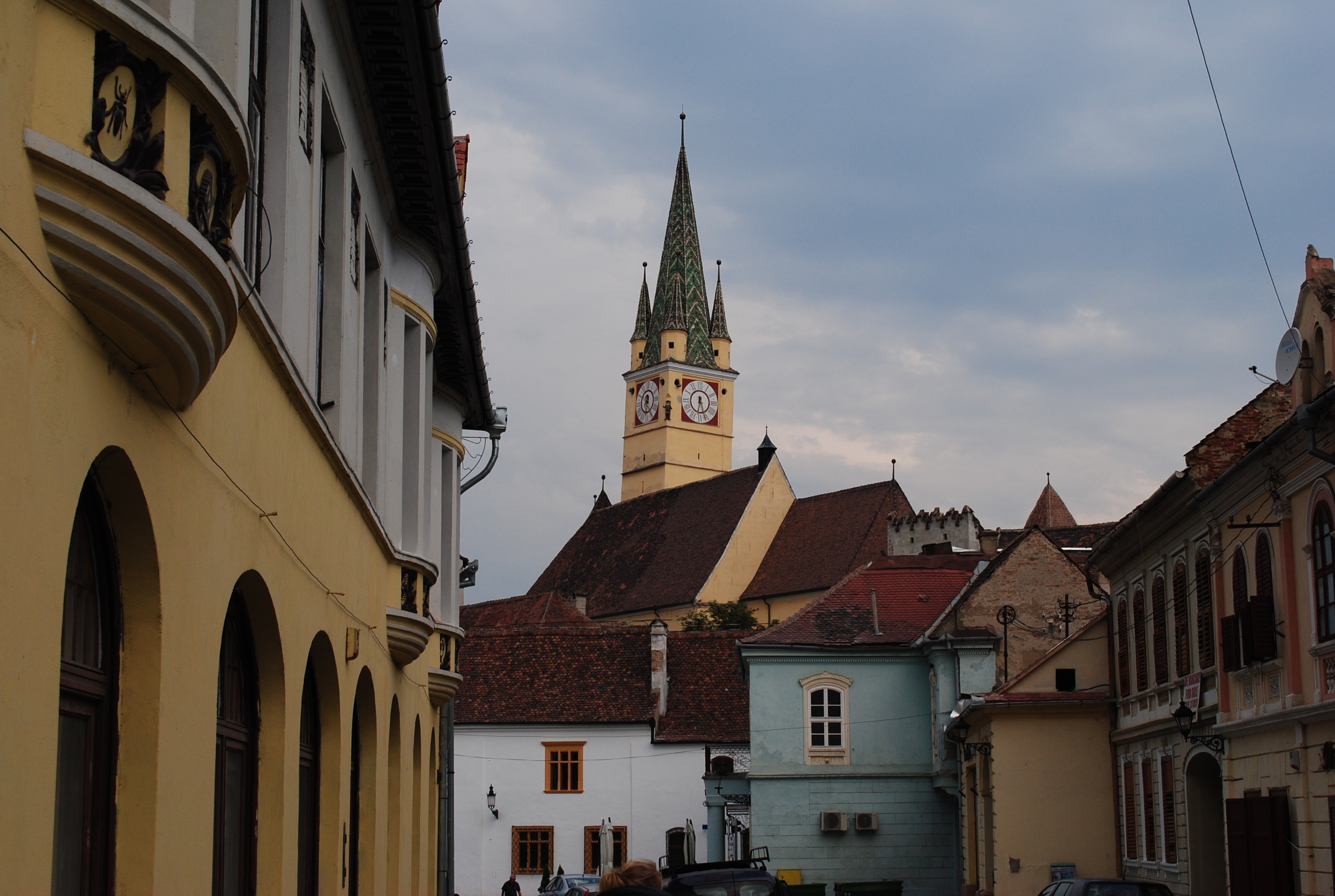
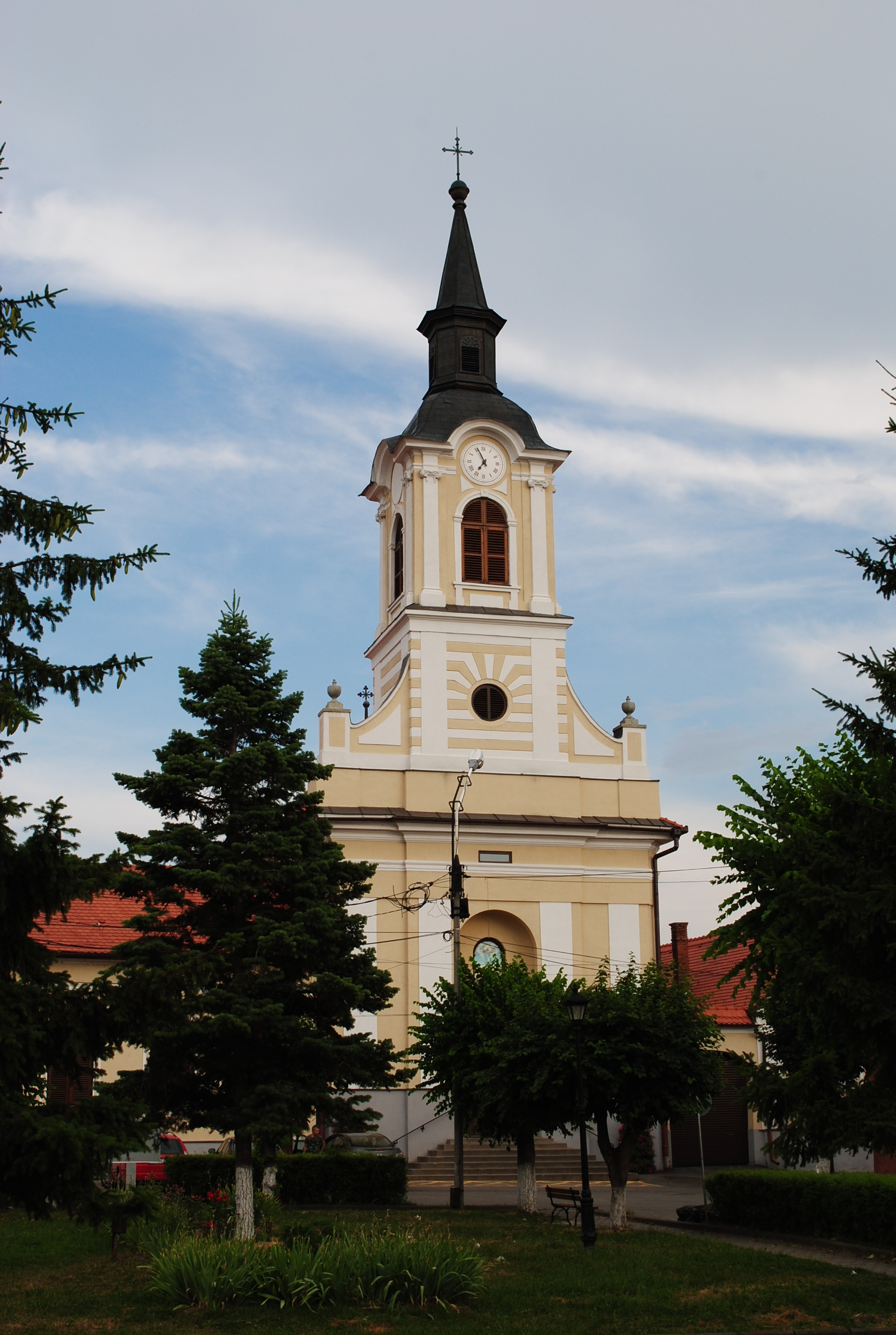
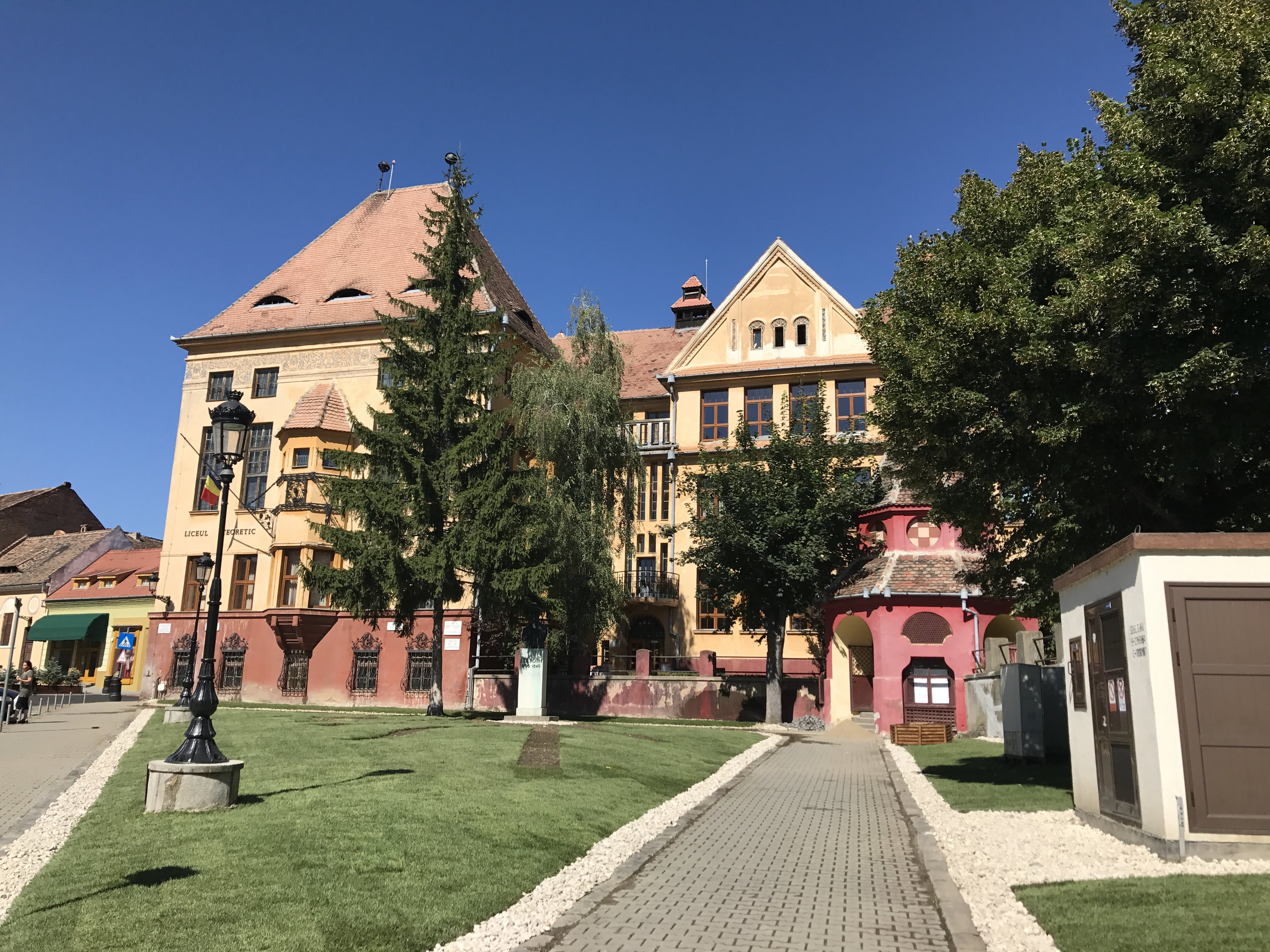
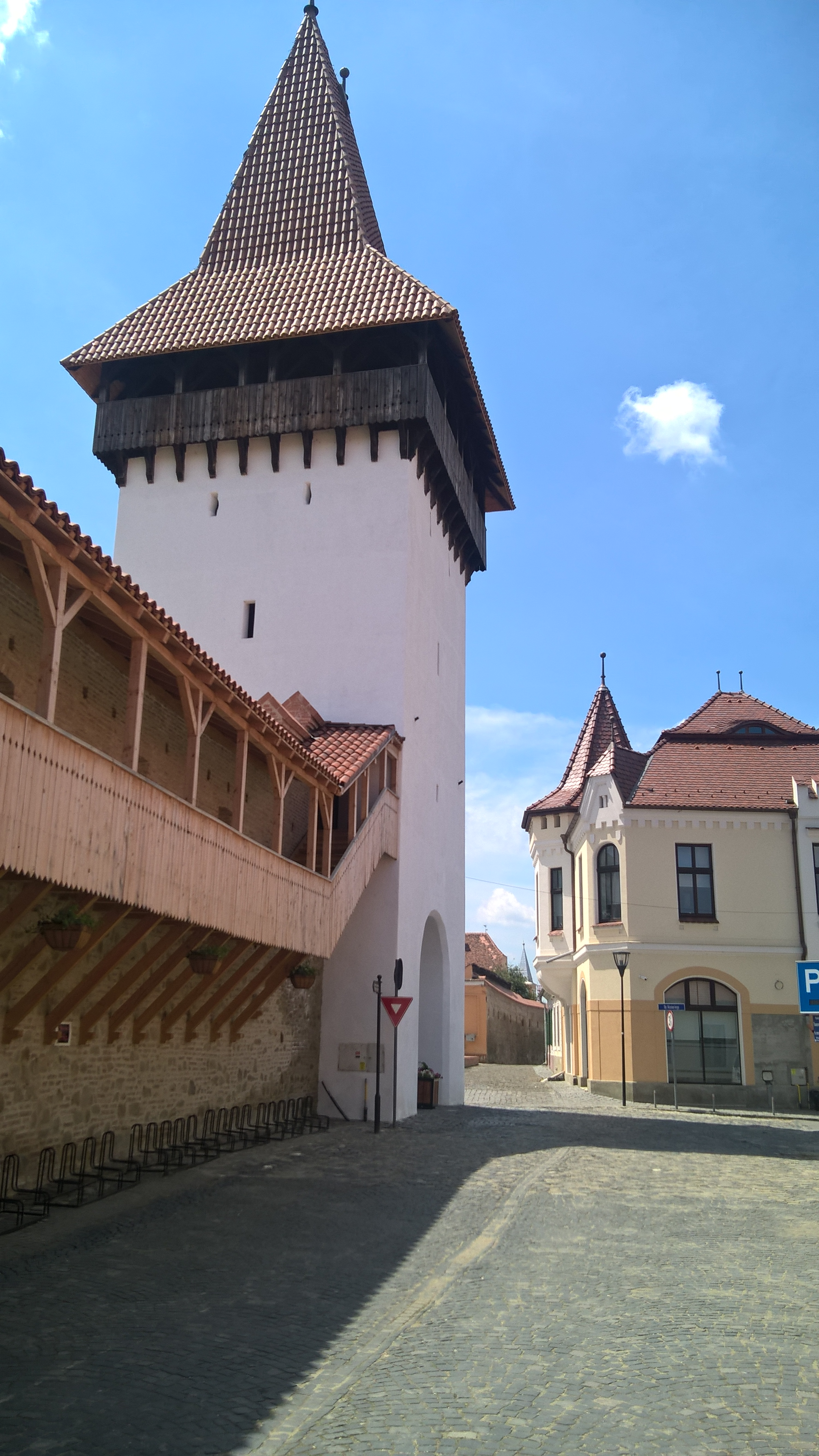
- Mediaș Fortified church skyline St. Michael and Gabriel church Historic city center Greek-Catholic Church Stephan Ludwig Roth High School Forkesch Tower

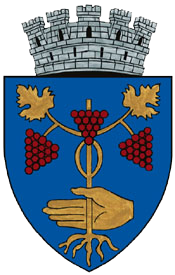
- Coat of arms

- Location in Sibiu County

- Location in Romania
- Coordinates: 46°9′50″N 24°21′3″E
- Country: Romania
- County: Sibiu

Government
  - Mayor (2024–2028): Gheorghe Roman (PNL)
- Area: 62.62 km^{2} (24.18 sq mi)
- Elevation: 330 m (1,080 ft)
- Population (2021-12-01): 39,505
  - Density: 630.9/km^{2} (1,634/sq mi)
- Time zone: UTC+02:00 (EET)
  - Summer (DST): UTC+03:00 (EEST)
- Postal code: 551002–551143
- Area code: (+40) 02 69
- Vehicle reg.: SB
- Website: www.primariamedias.ro

Mediaș (Romanian pronunciation: [ˈmedi.aʃ]; Latin: Media, German: Mediasch, Transylvanian Saxon: Medwesch/Medveš/Medwisch, Hungarian: Medgyes) is a city in Sibiu County, Romania, in the historical region of Transylvania. With a recorded history that began in the 13th century, it has nearly 40,000 residents today.

== Geography ==
Mediaș is located in the middle basin of Târnava Mare River, at 39 km (24 mi) from Sighișoara and 41 km (25 mi) from Blaj. The health resort Bazna, officially recognized for the first time in 1302, is 18 km (11 mi) from Mediaș. The health resort offers mineral water springs, rich in salts, mineral mud and a special type of salt, called "Bazna salt". The distance between Mediaș and the county's residence Sibiu is 55 km (34 mi).

The city administers one village, Ighișu Nou (Eibesdorf; Szászivánfalva).

== History ==
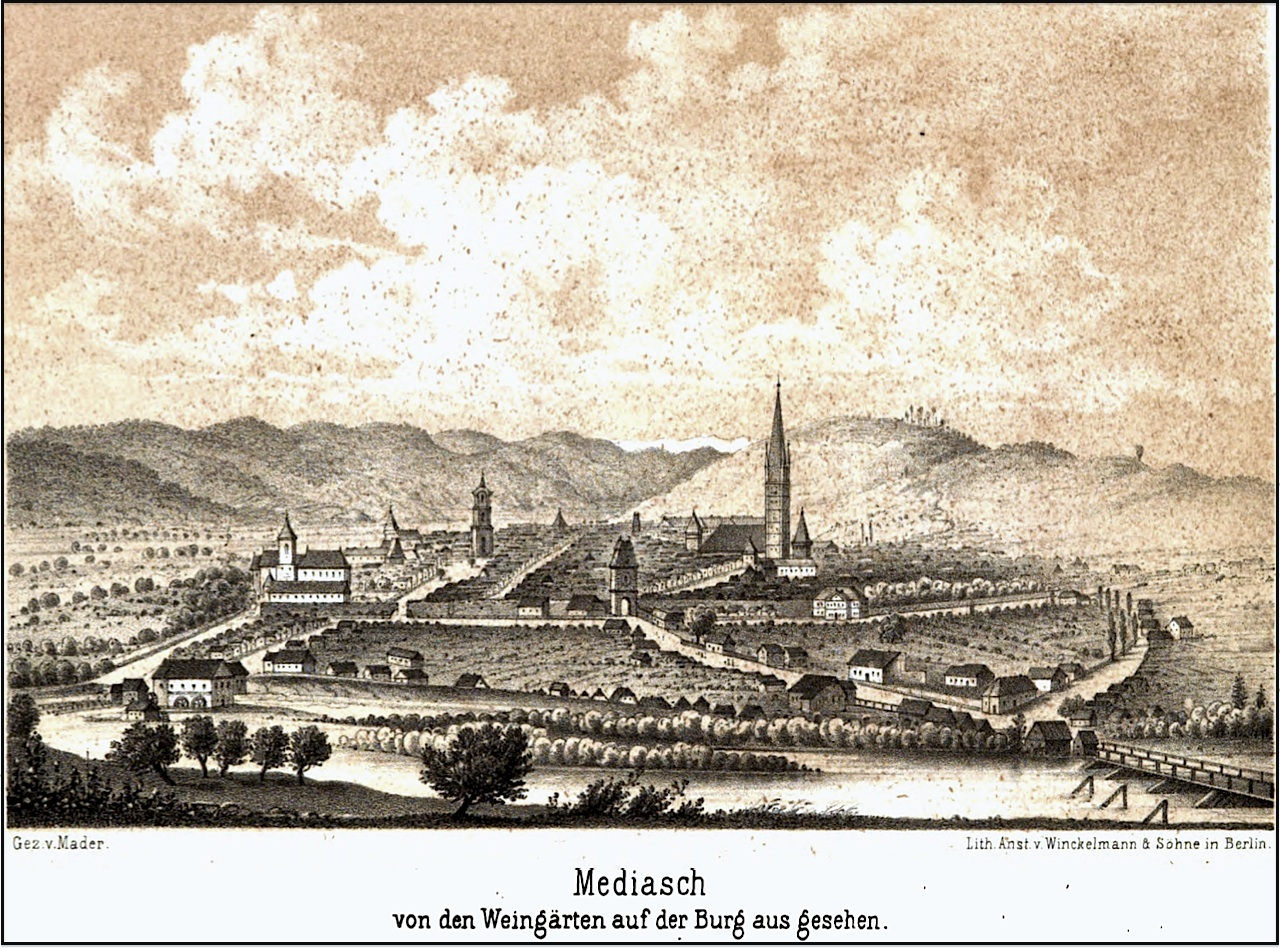
Mediaș in 1862

The first signs of human communities in the area are thought to be from the middle Neolithic period.

The name of the city comes from the Hungarian word meggy (sour cherry). The Romanian name originates in the German version, which comes from the Hungarian name (Medgyes).

In the 13th century, the kings of Hungary invited German settlers known as Transylvanian Saxons to the area, who settled in the valley of the Târnava Mare River.

- According to tradition, the town was founded in 1146, thus being one of the oldest cities in Transylvania.
- 1200: Here would have lived around 100 inhabitants.
- 1267: The first document that mentions the city (as Mediesy) is dated 3 June 1267.
- 1283: Another reference appears in a document: Mediaș is listed as "villa Medgyes".
- 1318: The Hungarian king Charles Robert of Anjou offers complete rights for the Sibiu region to people living in Mediaș, Șeica Mare, and Biertan.
- 1359: Mediaș is called for the first time a city ("civitas"). The first seal of Mediaș was used in 1448.
- 1414: The St. Margaret church was the first church built in Mediaș. The first document that notes the presence of a hospital in the city is dated 1487.
- 1448: While preparing for his campaign against the Ottoman Empire, John Hunyadi passed through Mediaș.
- 1490–1534: The city is fortified by the people living in Mediaș and Șeica Mare, after a document signed in 1477 by the king Matthias Corvinus's office.
- 1517: Mediaș obtains the right to organise annual fairs.
- 1557: The population of Mediaș was hit by leprosy. The plague has also devastated the population of Mediaș several times in history, in 1586, 1601–1604, 1633, 1646, 1653, 1656–1658, 1660–1661 and 1717–1718.
- 1562: 34 guilds are registered.
- 1586: The first mention of a school in Mediaș ("Schola civitatis").
- 1611: Mediaș is plundered by the soldiers of Gabriel Báthory.
- 1705: The city is besieged for the last time in its history.
- 1771–1781: The Johann Sifft typography started its activity.
- 1822: The first gymnastics association in present-day Romania was established.
- 1826: The first Romanian church in Mediaș was raised, with great effort and dedication from the Greek-Catholic Bishop Ioan Bob. During the same period, Ioan Bob established the first Romanian school in the city.
- 1863: Public lighting of streets in Mediaș was established.
- 1871: The agricultural school was founded and the G. A. Reisenberger typography started its activity.
- 1872: The first train station was built. The current train station was built between 1963 and 1965.
- 1918–1919: The city of Mediaș came under Romanian administration as a result of the Union of Transylvania with Romania and the subsequent Hungarian–Romanian War.
- 1920: The city became part of the Kingdom of Romania as a result of the Treaty of Trianon. It fell within the Târnava-Mare County, and became the administrative center of plasa Mediaș.
- 1950: After the establishment of the Romanian People's Republic in 1947 and the subsequent administrative reform, the city became part of the Sibiu Region, and from 1952, the Stalin Region (renamed Brașov Region in 1960).
- 1968: The old administrative division of județ was reinstated, and Mediaș became part of Sibiu County.

== Demographics ==
Historical population
Year	Pop.	±%
1850	5,230	—
1912	8,626	+64.9%
1930	15,505	+79.7%
1948	23,247	+49.9%
1956	32,498	+39.8%
1966	46,384	+42.7%
1977	65,072	+40.3%
1992	64,484	−0.9%
2002	55,203	−14.4%
2011	44,169	−20.0%
2022	39,505	−10.6%
Source: Official Austro-Hungarian and Romanian census data

In 1850, Mediaș had a population of 5,230 inhabitants, of which 2,986 were Germans (57.1%), 1,710 Romanians (32.7%), 264 Hungarians (5%), 200 Roma (3.8%), and 70 (1.3%) of other ethnicities. In 1910, the town had 8,626 inhabitants (44.8% Germans, more specifically Transylvanian Saxons, 31.6% Romanians, and 19.9% Hungarians). In 1992, there were 64,481 inhabitants. In 2022, according to that year's Romanian census postponed one year because of the COVID-19 pandemic, the figure had fallen to 39,505.

The ethnic composition in 2022 was as follows:

- 87.9% Romanians
- 7.6% Hungarians
- 3.2% Romani
- 1.2% Germans (Transylvanian Saxons)
- 0.1% Other minority ethnic groups

== Administration and local politics ==
=== Town council ===
The town is currently run by the mayor Gherorghe Roman and a local council, which is composed of 21 councilors and has the following multi-party political composition, based on the results of the votes cast at the 2024 Romanian local elections:

Party	Seats	Current Council
National Liberal Party (PNL)	8	
Patriots' Party (PP)	7	
Social Democratic Party (PSD)	3	
Alliance for the Union of Romanians (AUR)	2	
Democratic Union of Hungarians in Romania (UDMR)	1	

== Economy ==
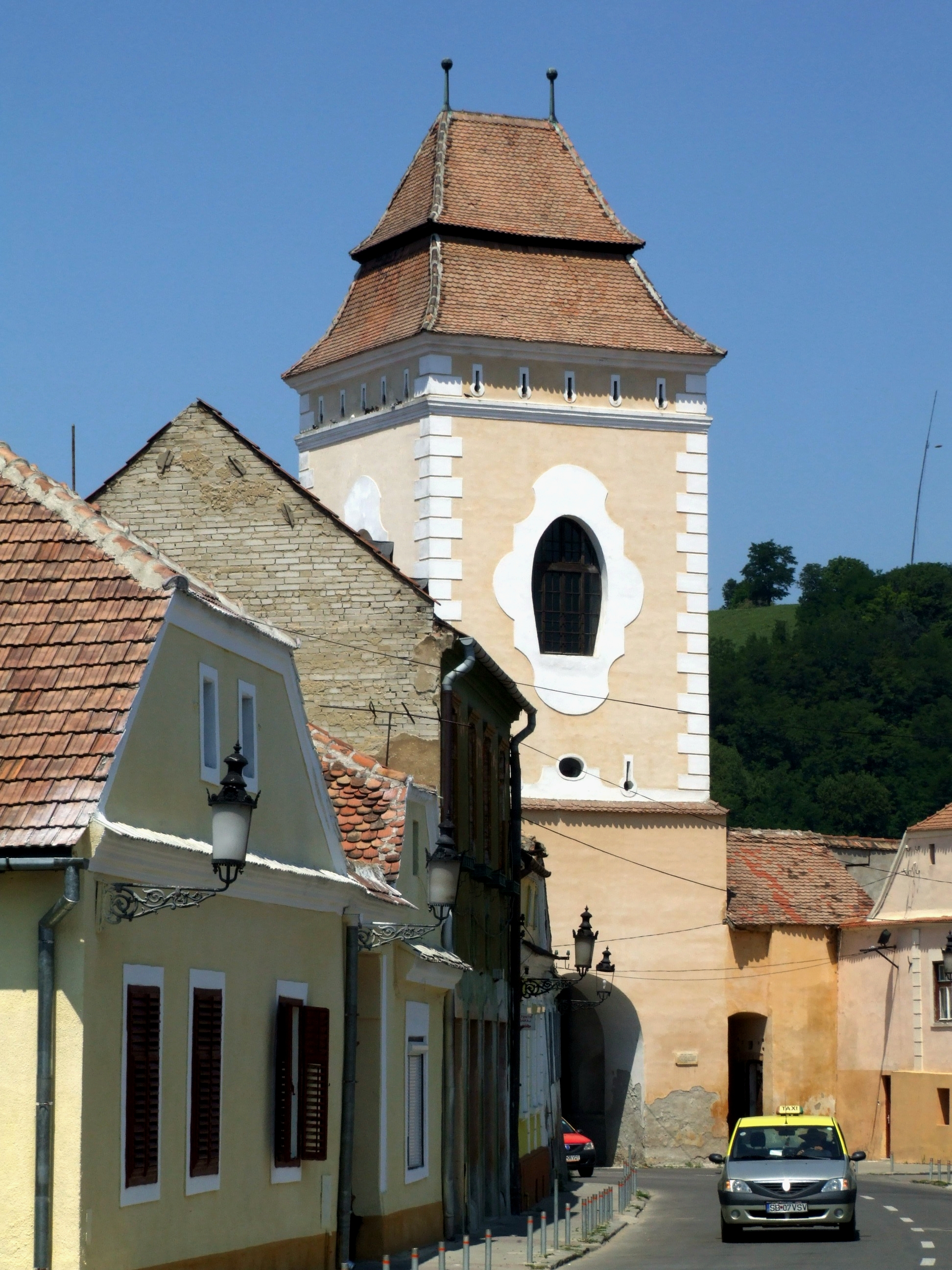
Stonemasons' Tower (2009)

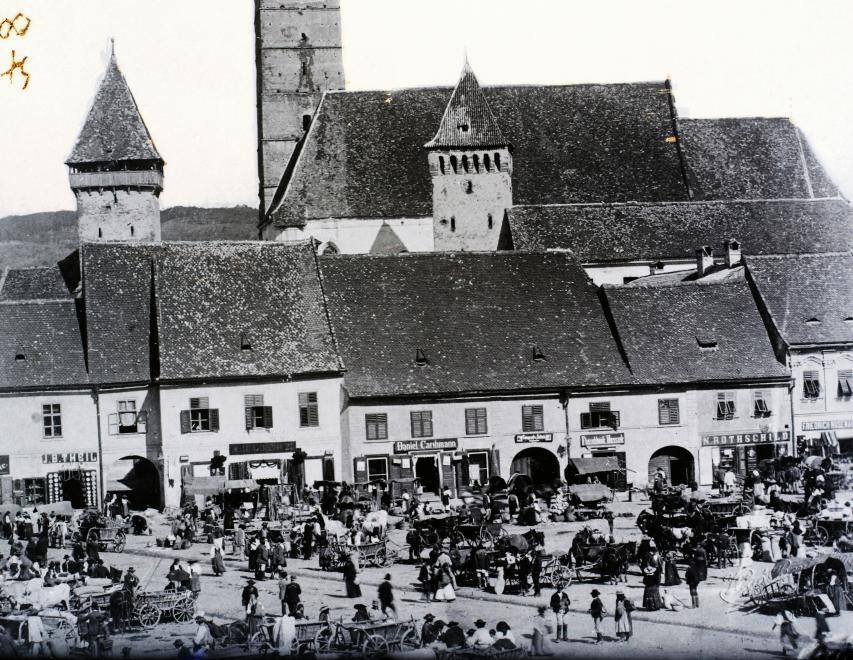
The old market in the town centre (as seen at the end of the 19th century)

Mediaș is the second industrial center after Sibiu in the county. From the 14th to 19th centuries, various manufacturers and professionals were members of associations based on their trades called bresle (guilds), the first two unions were the ones formed by tailors and cloth makers, in 1457. In 1698, Mediaș already had 33 unions.

In the 19th century, unions started to merge and build factories. The first factory, called "Karres", was established in 1881 and produced various leather products. In 1888, a factory that manufactured cloth and various textiles was built, followed in 1895 by a factory called "Salconserv" that produced salami and cans. The company used to produce the famous brand of salami called Salam de Sibiu, for the company "Theil & Co. A.G. Salami und Selchwarenfabrik", located in Sibiu.

In 1921, Mediaș started to manufacture windows. The factory is now called Geromed and extended its products with blackboards, mirrors, windscreens and stained glass. In the same year, a factory now called Emailul started to produce enameled pots, mugs and dishes.

The "Vitrometan" factory was built in 1922 and produces various glass products, including porcelain, light bulbs and mirrors. "Relee S.A" manufactures automobile components, switches, wall sockets, relays and electric motors.

Mediaș is known best for its role in production of methane gas. The area where Mediaș is located is the site of the largest natural gas field in Romania. The headquarters of Romgaz - the national gas exploitation enterprise - and of Transgaz - the natural gas carrier - are in Mediaș.

== Education ==
Mediaș has close to 20 kindergartens and 10 schools (they are numbered, and three of them have names):

- School no. 1 – Mihai Eminescu
- School no. 8 – Constantin Motaș
- School no. 9 – Hermann Oberth (German school)
- School no. 10 – Báthory István (Hungarian school)

There are also 5 high-schools in the city:

- Stephan Ludwig Roth High-School
- National School of Gas College
- Axente Sever Theoretical High-School
- Automecanica Technological College
- Mediensis Technical College

== Media ==
Newspapers

- Monitorul de Mediaș
- Medieșeanul
- Ziarul de Mediaș

TV channels

- Nova TV

Radio stations

- Radio Mediaș 88.1 FM
- Radio Ring 90.2 FM

== Tourism ==
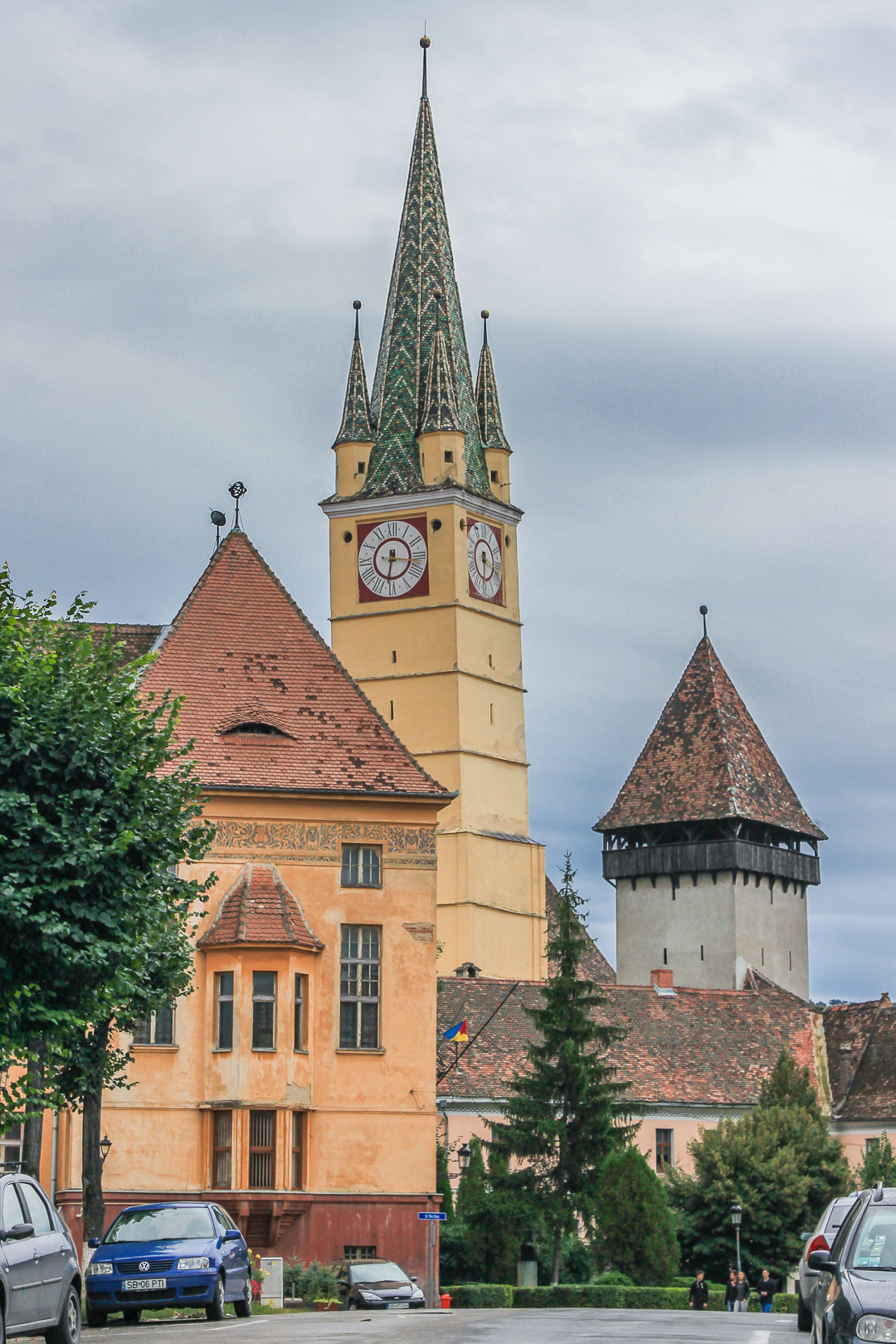
View towards the Tower of the Buglers ("Turnul Tromperilor") and the Stephan Ludwig Roth theoretical high school

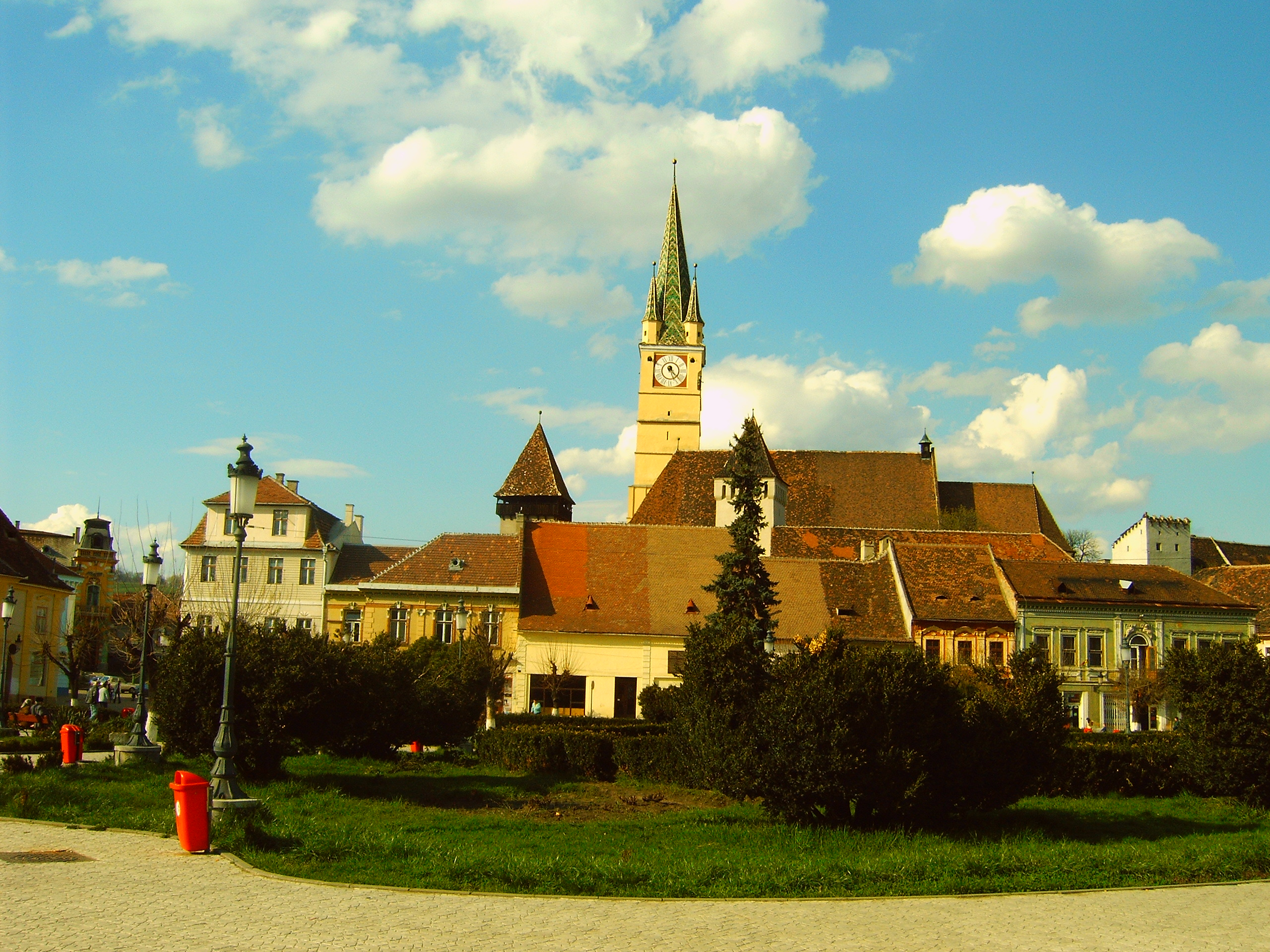
King Ferdinand the First Square Mediaș/Mediasch in 2006

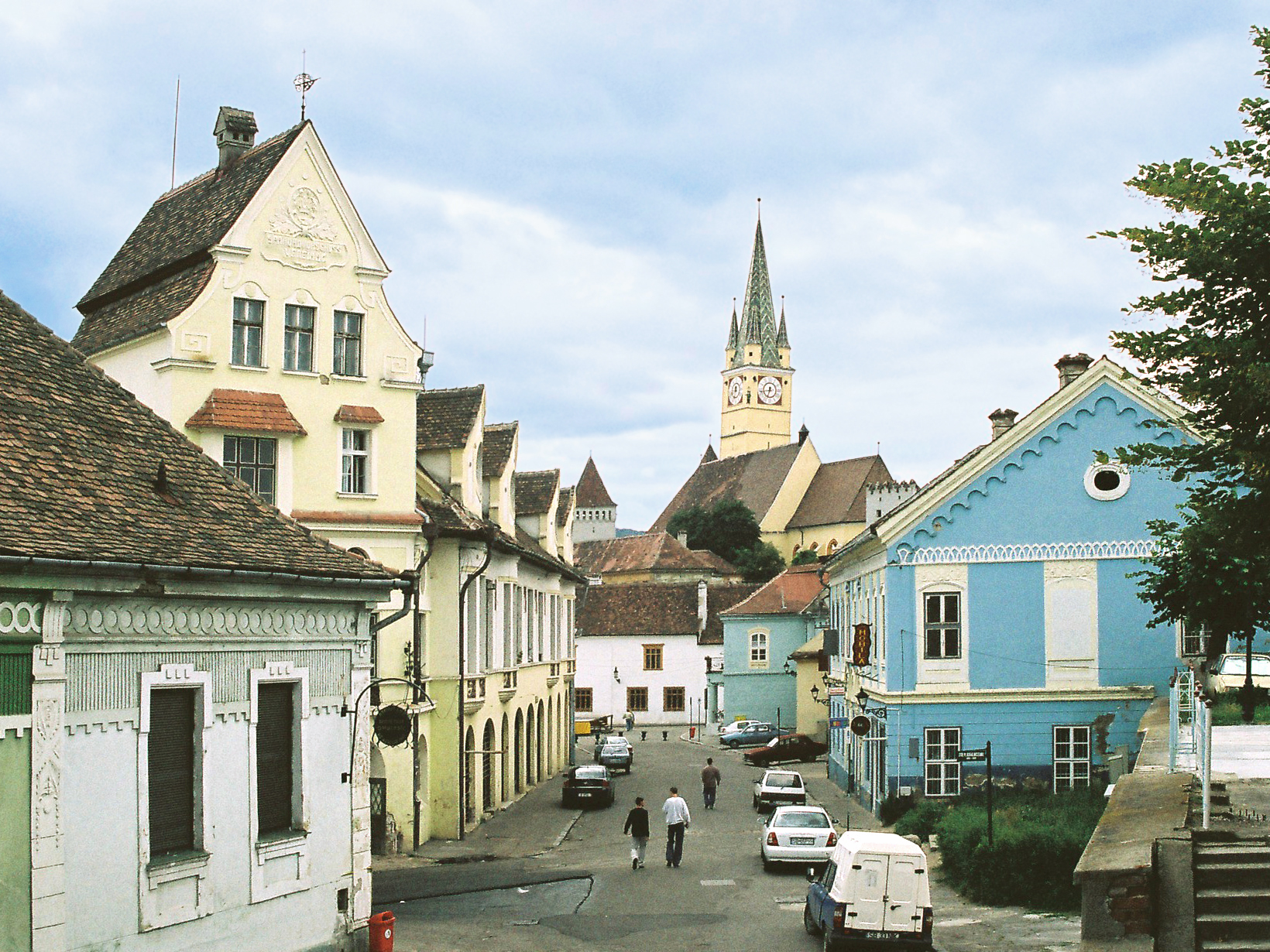
The historic town centre of Mediaș/Mediasch in 2006

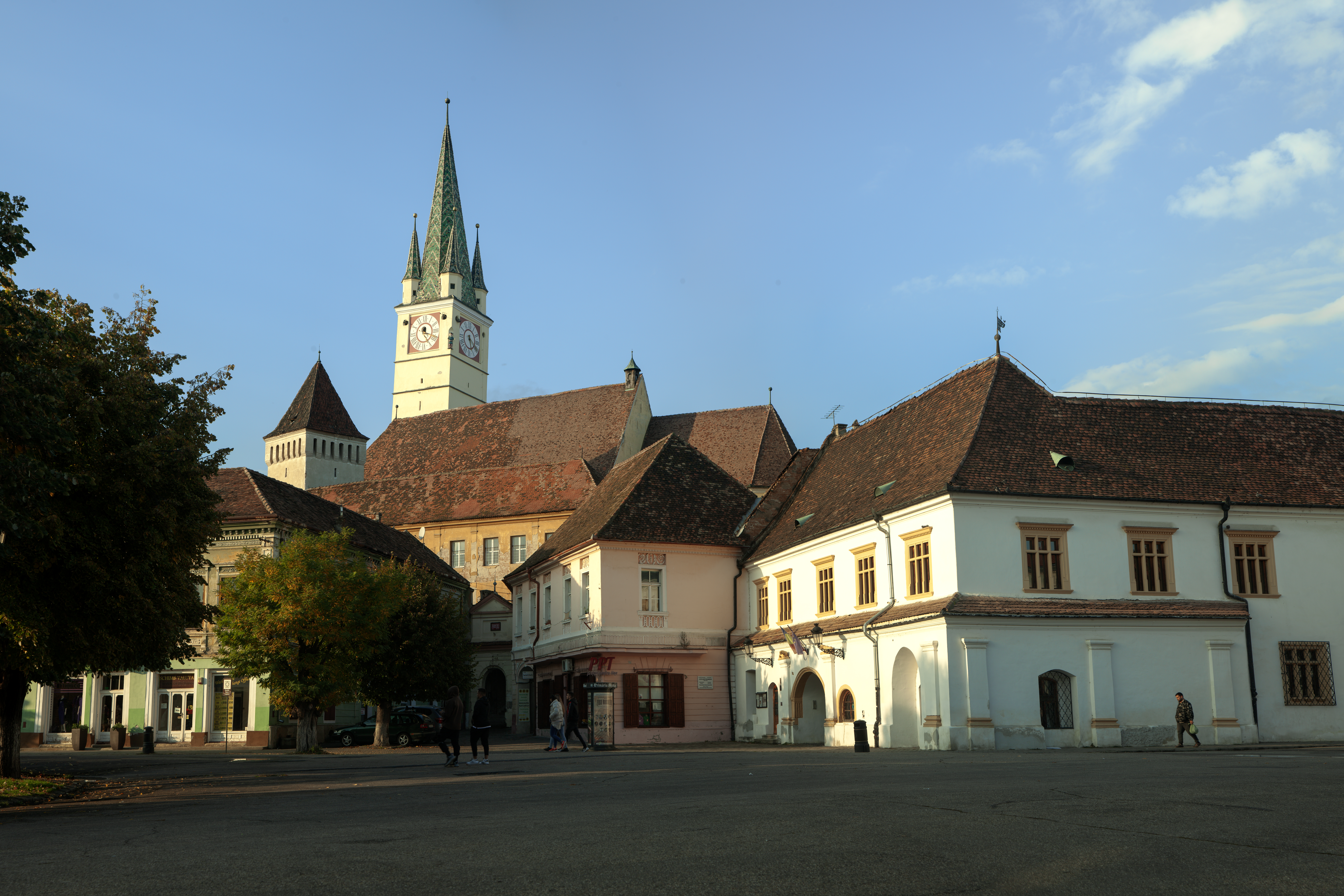
The historic town centre of Mediaș/Mediasch in 2022

Mediaș has one of the best preserved historical centers in Romania and also some well preserved medieval fortifications. One symbol of the town is the Tower of the Buglers, which is about 70 metres (230 feet) tall. Its construction started in the 13th century. In the 15th century it was raised to 5 tiers. The St. Margaret Church was finished at about the same time. Later, 3 more tiers were added in only two months. The roof consists of colored vitrified tiles, and four turrets were built. The tower had a guard, who would sound his bugle whenever an enemy approached. The tower has in its southwestern corner (between the clocks) a small wooden man who rings a bell, thus announcing in advance when the clock will ring on the hour. The heavy pressure of the tower on the sandy soil is the reason why the tower is slightly tilted to the North. Between 1927 and 1930, and later in 1972, the tower was consolidated. The tilt of the tip compared with the base is 2.32 m (7 ft 7 in).

The town lies in the middle of the area which was inhabited by Transylvanian Saxons and in an area of 20 km (12 mi) around it there are dozens of fortified churches. Two of these, Biertan and Valea Viilor, are part of the Villages with fortified churches in Transylvania UNESCO World Heritage Site.

St. Margaret's Church: The fortified church was built in gothic style in 1488, with time it went through different modifications. The feeble ground structure made its tower, built in 1460, inclines. In 1550 the church was raised with three storeys and in 1551 four smaller towers were added to show that the city had a court. It was at that time that it attained its 68.5 metres (225 feet) height. In 1783 the roof-structure was changed and the small towers renovated, it was also then that the golden globe, dating from 1550, was brought down from the tower and according to tradition its content was read aloud. The tower proved to be a good spotting post. In those times the trumpeter in the tower had an important function, sounding the alert about approaching danger. If he made a mistake, he would've been thrown out from the top of the tower. From this does the towers name derive, Trumpeters tower. In this tower was ordered to be locked Vlad the Impaler, a.k.a. Dracula, by King Matthias Corvinus in 1476. On the inside walls of the church one can see 14th- or 15th-century frescoes. The altar was made in 1480 in Gothic style, and portrays the sufferings of Jesus. On the portrait, below the crucified Jesus' arm, a panorama of Vienna can be observed, thereby indicating the portrait's origin. The church walls are also decorated with eastern wall carpets given to the church by Christians, some dating back to the 16th century. In the church there is the oldest brazen baptistry in Romania, made at the beginning of the 19th century. The canopy of the pulpit was made in 1679 by master Sigismund Moess. Its pipe-organ, from 1755, is appropriate for symphony concerts. While those concerts happen, the church benches are turned to face the pipe-organ.

The route of the Via Transilvanica long-distance trail passes through Mediaș.

== Wine ==
The grapes and wine leaves visible in the city's coat of arms refer to the (once well-known) wine from Mediaș. For example, the wine is mentioned early in Bram Stoker's novel Dracula: "The wine was Golden Mediasch, which produces a queer sting on the tongue, which is, however, not disagreeable" (Jonathan Harker's diary, May 5, on his way to the castle of the count).

== Sports ==
Football

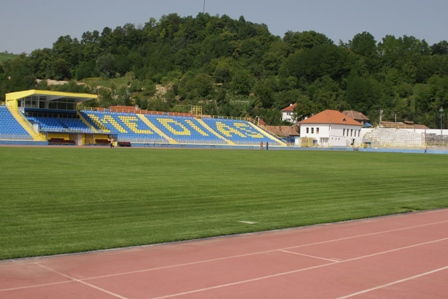
Gaz Metan stadium in Mediaș.

- Gaz Metan Mediaș - founded in 1945 and dissolved in 2022, had played most of its history in Liga I and Liga II
- ACS Mediaș 2022 - founded in 2022, currently playing in Liga III

Basketball

- CSM Mediaș - dissolved, had played in Division A.

Cycling

- The annual mountain bike marathon (in Romanian: Maratonul Medieval Mediaș) is a popular bicycle race usually held in June.

== Natives ==
- Ioan Adam (b. 1946), historian
- Marius Baciu (b. 1975), football player
- Andreas Brecht von Brechtenberg (1805–1842), German poet
- Ionuț Buzean (b. 1982), football player
- Iulian Cristea (b. 1994), football player
- Octavian Fodor (1913–1976), doctor
- Giulio Gari (1909–1994), tenor
- Ioan Ghișe (b. 1956), politician
- Tudor Cristian Jurgiu (b. 1984), film director and writer
- Margareta Keszeg (b. 1965), middle distance runner
- Laura Codruța Kövesi (b. 1973), prosecutor, the first European Chief Prosecutor and the former chief prosecutor of Romania's National Anticorruption Directorate, born in Sfântu Gheorghe, raised in Mediaș
- Paul Traugott Meissner (1778–1864), Austrian chemist
- Alexandru Munteanu (b. 1987), football player
- Estelle Nathan (1871–1949), Austrian-British painter
- Darius Olaru (b. 1998), football player
- Alexandru Oroian (b. 2001), football player
- Paul Pîrvulescu (b. 1988), football player
- Horațiu Potra (b. 1970), mercenary
- George Puflea (1883–1950s), early aviator, he flew in the First Balkan War, in the Mexican Revolution, in World War I, and in early American and Mexican civil aviation
- Cristian Pustai (b. 1967), football player and manager
- Stephan Ludwig Roth (1796–1849), Transylvanian Saxon intellectual, teacher, pedagogue, revolutionary leader, and Evangelical Lutheran pastor
- Adrian Andrei Rusu (b. 1951), researcher in Romanian medieval archaeology
- Christian Schesaeus (1535–1585), Transylvanian Saxon humanist, poet, and a Lutheran pastor
- Ruxandra Sireteanu (1945–2008), biophysicist and neuroscientist who undertook pioneering research into the human visual system
- Willie Schneider (b. 1963), German skeleton racer
- Mihaela Tatu (b. 1963), TV host
- George Togan (1910–2003), historian
- Michael Weiß (1569–1612), Transylvanian Saxons politician and historian

== Twin towns – sister cities ==
Mediaș is twinned with:

- Cricova, Moldova, since 1 December 2018.
- Dąbrowa Górnicza, Poland, since 19 December 2011.
- De Fryske Marren, Netherlands, since 18 December 1995.
- Mineral Wells, United States, since 31 November 2005.
- Sopron, Hungary, since 25 October 1993.
- Wittenberg, Germany, since 30 October 2019.
