= Christian Schesaeus =

Transylvanian Saxon poet

Christian Schesaus (1535 – July 30, 1585) was a Transylvanian Saxon humanist, poet, and Lutheran pastor.

He was born in Mediaș, studied first in Brașov, and then from 1556 to 1558 at the University of Wittenberg.

Ruinae Pannonnicae, his best known work, was written in Latin and composed in dactylic hexameter on the model of Virgil's Aeneid. The subject of the poem deals with the events in Transylvania, Hungary, Wallachia and Moldavia over the 31-year period of 1540 to 1571. Schesaus insists on the Roman origin and heritage of Romanians, backed by evidence he presents (together with proof of Dacian contributions). The work was first printed in Wittenberg (1571), and it ensured that Schesaus was awarded the title of Poet Laureate by Prince Stephen Bathory.

Around 1580, Christian Schesaus was living in Biertan; he died of the plague. He was buried in St. Margaret's Church, Mediaș, where his epitaph can still be seen in the choir.
