= St. Margaret's Church, Mediaș =

Coordinates: 46.1651°N 24.3513°E

St. Margaret's Church
- Biserica Sfânta Margareta
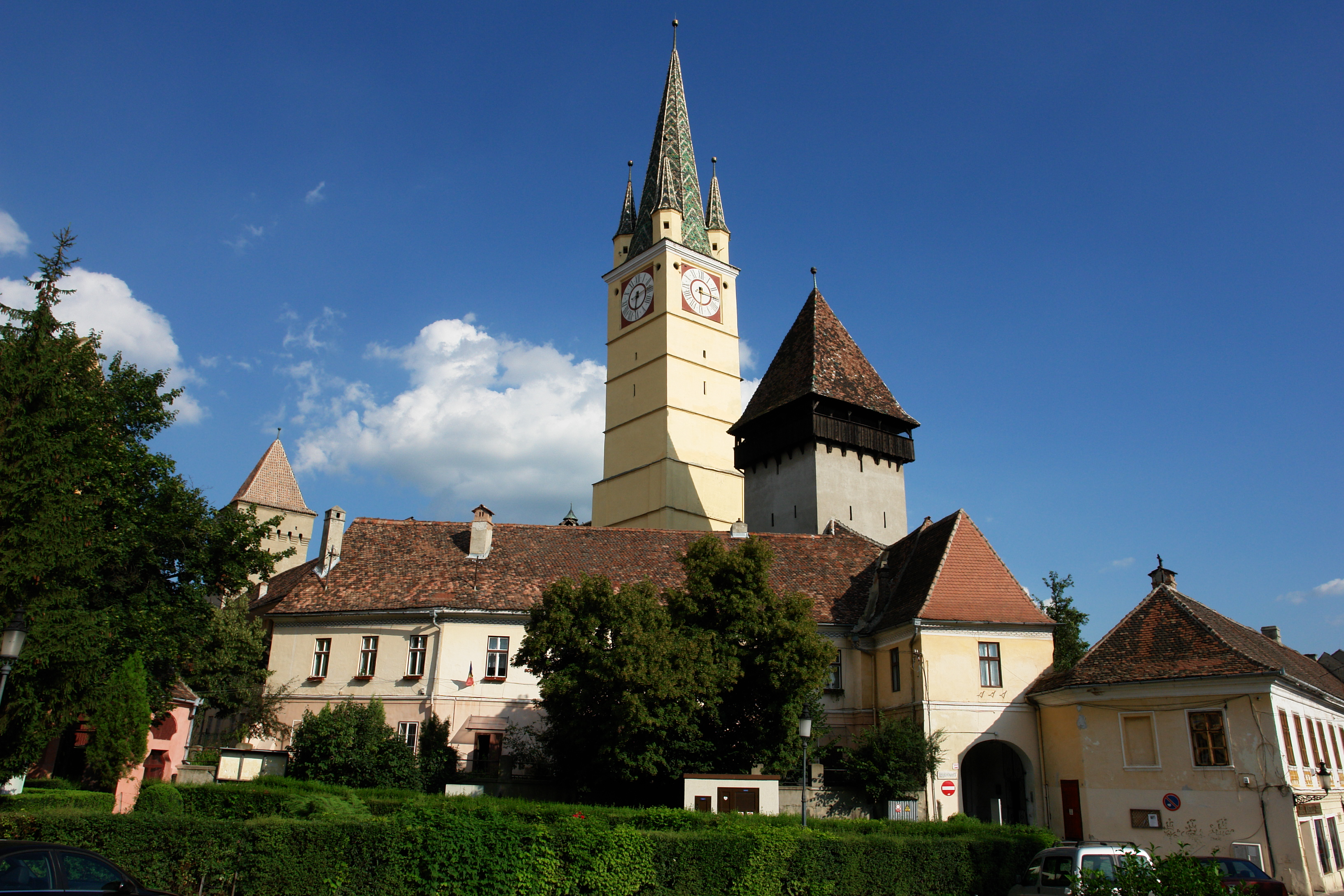
- Interactive map of the St. Margaret's Church area

General information
- Architectural style: Late Gothic architecture
- Location: Mediaș, Romania
- Completed: ca. 1488

Height
- Height: 56 m (184 ft)

St. Margaret's Church (Romanian: Biserica Sfânta Margareta; German: Margarethenkirche) is a Lutheran church located at 1 Piața Castelului in the town center of Mediaș (Mediasch), Sibiu County, in the Transylvania region of Romania.

The present late Gothic structure was built between 1437 and 1488 by the ethnic German Transylvanian Saxon community at a time when the area was ruled by the Kingdom of Hungary. Consecrated as a Roman Catholic church, with St Margaret of Antioch as its patron saint, it became Lutheran in 1545, during the Reformation.

St. Margaret's church is located at the center of a large church fortress. About 150 of these buildings still exist in Transylvania. Seven of these villages with fortified churches are listed as UNESCO World Heritage Sites. It is listed as a historic monument by Romania's Ministry of Culture and Religious Affairs.

== History ==
Archaeological surveys conducted in 1971–2 showed that a church building existed at the site of the current church by the second half of the 13th century. Human burials were unearthed which were attributed to the German sepulchral culture of this time. By the beginning of the 15th century, this building was replaced by a second, which took the form of an aisleless church with an unusually long nave. Parts of this structure survive in the northern nave of the current building.

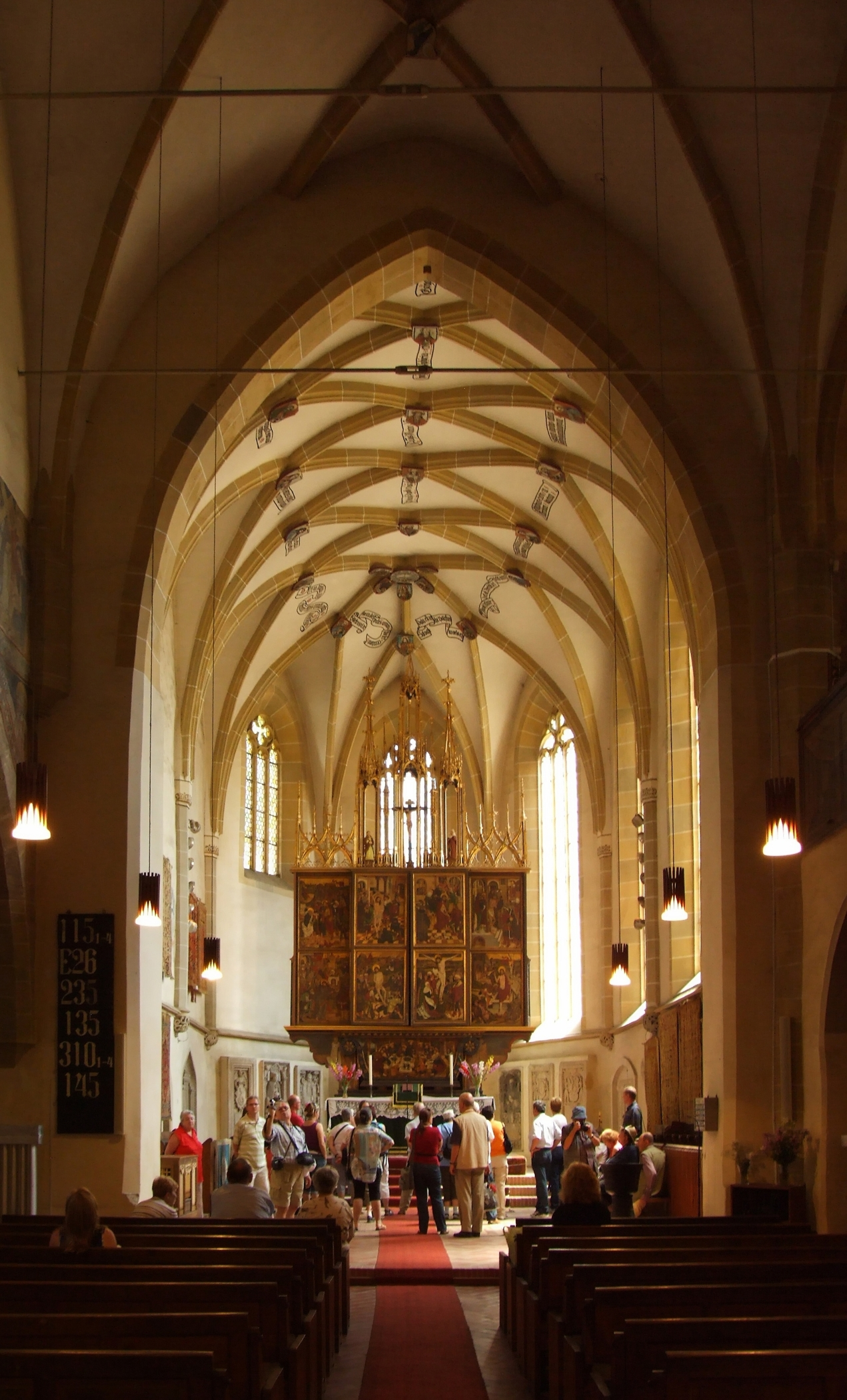
Choir of St. Margaret's church with the late Gothic winged altarpiece

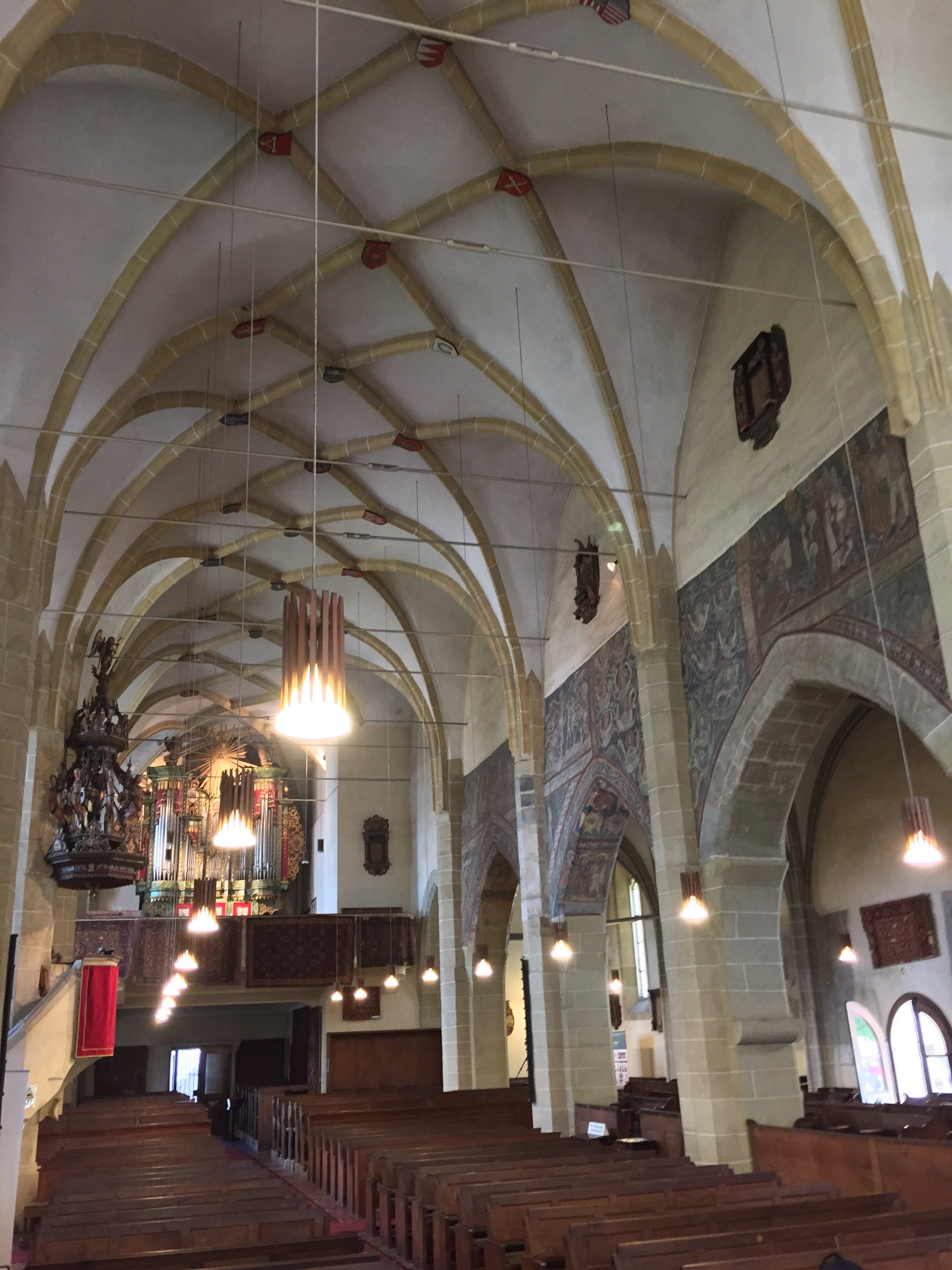
St. Margaret's Church, Mediaș, Sibiu County, Romania. View into the nave and northern aisle, 2018

St. Margaret's church is first documented in 1414. The construction of the present building probably started after a devastating Ottoman raid in 1438. The church registry of 1447 relates that a Father Christian from Mettersdorf (Dumitra) had filed a public protest against the Bishop of Weissenburg (Alba Iulia) "in porta ecclesiae parochialis beatae Margarethae virginis et martyris in oppido Medyes – at the door of the parochial church of the blessed virgin and martyr Margaret". The oldest church bell has an inscribed date of 1449. During the second half of the 15th century, the choir, nave, and south aisle were modified. According to the 18th century historian Georg Soterius, an inscription was found on the walls of one of the towers relating its date of completion as 1484, and that the building was completed in 1488.

Some fortification works were already documented in 1453. The fortress with its triple encircling walls, moat and five defensive towers, was likely completed later.

In 1545, the first Evangelical Synod of Transylvania assembled in St. Margaret's church. In the wake of the reformatory iconoclastic fury, all side altars and religious statues and images were removed, and the frescoes on the north wall of the nave and north aisle were painted over in white. Further renovation works are documented for 1584, 1606, 1636 and 1668. In 1732, the organ was restored on the western gallery. In 1832, the pillars on the northern side of the nave were reinforced. Major restorations were also conducted from 1888–1892. In 1927–1930, the foundations of the main tower, the Trumpeter's tower, were stabilized. An archaeological survey of the building and its surroundings was conducted by the Romanian scientists Vasile Crișan and Mariana Beldie-Dumitrache in 1971 and 1972. In 1973–1974, the foundations of the Trumpeter's tower had to be reinforced again. This time, the two lower floors were mantled in prestressed concrete. Further restorations were conducted from 1973–1986. From 1976–1982, the late Gothic winged altarpiece, one of the masterpieces of Transylvanian art, was thoroughly cleaned and restored.

== Interior ==
The main altar, located in the choir of St. Margaret's church, is a late Gothic winged altarpiece, dated between 1480 and 1520. Its work-day (closed) view is adorned with eight painted panels depicting the passion of Christ. On the northern walls of the nave and north aisle, frescoes were discovered under layers of white paint, and partly restored. In the choir, eight grave slates are on display today, one of them commemorating the pastor, poet and humanist Christian Schesaeus (1535–1585). Various wooden and painted epitaphs adorn the interior of the church. St. Margaret's church also houses one of the largest collections of "Transylvanian" rugs, 16th–18th century Anatolian rugs in Europe.

The church housed a large trove of incunabula. The discovery of these medieval and early modern books and manuscripts was announced by Professor Adinel C. Dincă of Babeș-Bolyai University in 2022.

== Literature ==
- Drotloff, Hansotto; Schuster, Günther E. (2009). Mediasch: ein historischer Streifzug durch die siebenbürgisch-sächsische Stadt an der Kokel = Mediaș: History of the Transylvanian Saxon town by the river Kokel (in German) (2 ed.). Sibiu/Hermannstadt: Schiller. pp. 100–138. ISBN 9-783-9412-7115-9.
- Fabini, Hermann (2013). Sakrale Baukunst in siebenbürgisch-sächsischen Städten = Sacral buildings in Transylvanian Saxon towns (in German). Hermannstadt/Sibiu: Monumenta-Verl. pp. 171–208. ISBN 9-789-7379-6915-6.
- Folberth, Otto (1973). Gotik in Siebenbürgen – Der Meister des Mediascher Altars und seine Zeit = Gothic art in Transylvania – The Master of the Mediaș altarpiece and his time. Vienna, Munich: Schroll. ISBN 3-7031-0358-2.
- Ionescu, Stefano (2018). Die Margarethenkirche in Mediasch : das Bauwerk und die Teppichsammlung = St Margaret's church in Mediaș : the monument and the carpet collection (1 ed.). Rome: Verduci Editore. ISBN 978-88-7620-928-4.
