= Key to the City (disambiguation) =

The Key to the City is an honor bestowed by a city upon esteemed residents and visitors.

Key to the City, or Keys to the City, may also refer to:

- Key to the City (film), 1950, starring Clark Gable and Loretta Young
- Keys to the City (Mulgrew Miller album), 1985
- Keys to the City (Ramsey Lewis album), 1987
- "Keys to the City" (song), 2008, credited to Ministry and Co-Conspirators
- "Keys to the City" (song by Tiwa Savage), 2014, credited to Tiwa Savage
