= Alberto Salinas Carranza =

Alberto Salinas Carranza (November 15, 1892 – October 31, 1970) was a Mexican aviator who participated in the Mexican Revolution.

Carranza was born in Cuatro Ciénegas, Coahuila, Mexico on November 15, 1892, the oldest of 3 children of Jose Maria Salinas Balmaceda and Mary Garza Carranza. He married Peruvian Delfina Duque, who died young in 1936. In 1938 he married Sara Berta Stephens.

Carranza went to the U.S. to study mechanical engineering at Rensselaer Polytechnic Institute. He returned to Mexico during the government of Francisco I. Madero, and he studied at the Moissant School of Aviation, along with his cousin Gustavo Salinas, and graduated in 1912.

After the usurpation of Victoriano Huerta in February 1913 he joined the constitutionalist movement led by his uncle, who was commissioned to organize an air fleet of three aircraft, which participated in several battles.

In 1915 Carranza participated in the Battle of El Ébano, San Luis Potosí, against Villa's forces, and helped Yucatán campaign led by Salvador Alvarado. He organized the Department of Aviation, with its aeronautical workshops and a school for training military pilots. He was also the head of a cartridge factory.

After the war Carranza was exiled in Lima, Peru, and then in the United States. He returned to be a Senator of the Mexican Republic in the XXXVII Legislature. In June 1942 he was conferred the rank of General, and in January 1951 reached the rank of Brigadier General. He was a military air attaché at the embassies in Washington, Paris, Rome and Belgrade.

In the early 1960s he worked as a counselor in the presidency. He led the Veterans of the Revolution and was a board member of the Mexican Legion of Honor. He wrote several works including The Punitive Expedition. He died in Mexico City on October 31, 1970.
