= Moisant Aviation School =

American aviation school founded by Alfred Moisant

Coordinates: 40°42′17″N 73°37′2″W

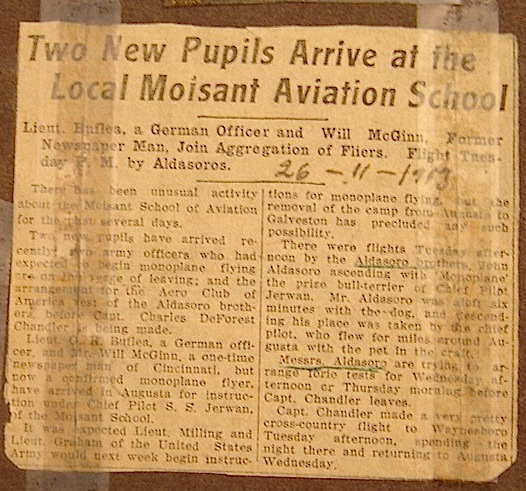
Newspaper clipping from 26 February 1913 describing the arrival of two new pupils, the Aldasoro Brothers, to the Moisant Aviation School

The Moisant Aviation School was a flight school in the early days of aviation founded by Alfred Moisant in Hempstead, on Long Island, in New York, United States.

== Description ==
Alfred and his brother John Bevins Moisant formed the Moisant International Aviators, a flying circus which toured the United States, Mexico and El Salvador. John had learned to fly in France with Louis Bleriot but died in 1910 in an accident. The school had six Bleriot monoplanes equipped with 50 horse power Gnome motors.

Many early aviators learned to fly or perfected their skills at this school, among them:

- Harriet Quimby, the first woman to obtain her pilot's license in the United States
- Matilde E. Moisant, John's and Alfred's sister and the second woman to obtain a pilot's license in the United States
- the Aldasoro brothers Juan Pablo and Eduardo, two Mexican pilots who had started to fly gliders in 1909
- Dante Nannini Sandoval, the first Guatemalan pilot
- Bernetta Adams Miller, the fifth licensed woman pilot in the United States. Under the auspices of the school, Bernetta Miller demonstrated the Moisant/Bleriot monoplane to the United States Army in October 1912, and subsequently made an unsuccessful attempt on the women's altitude record.

Albert Jewell, an instructor at the school, disappeared on 13 October 1913 on flight from the Hempstead airfield to Oakwood, Staten Island, New York to take part in an air race; he is assumed to have come down at sea off the South Shore of Long Island.

== Gallery ==
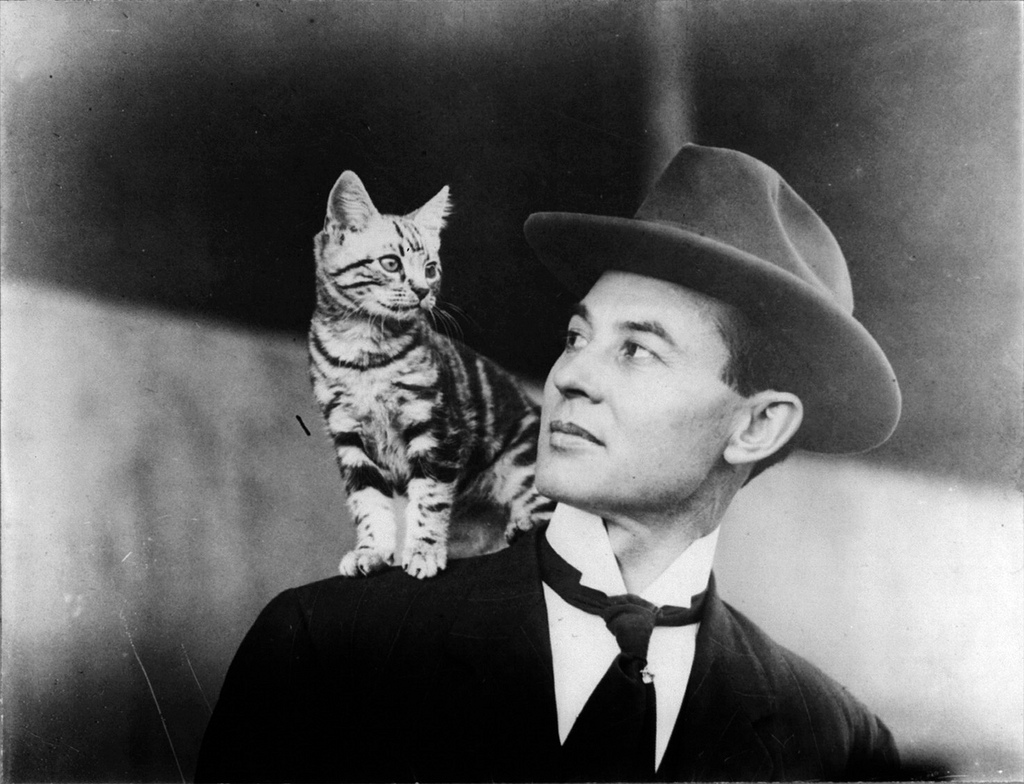
John B. Moisant and his cat Mademoiselle Fifi who made the first passenger flight across the English Channel on 23 August 1910.

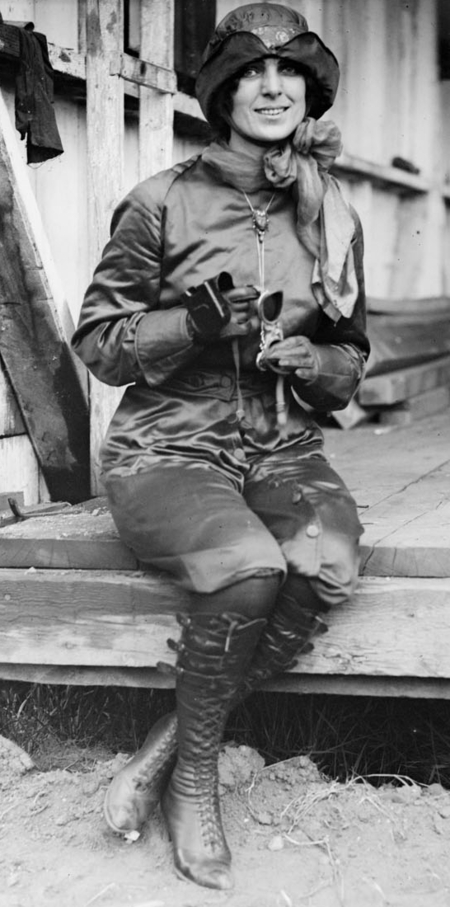
Harriet Quimby 1911

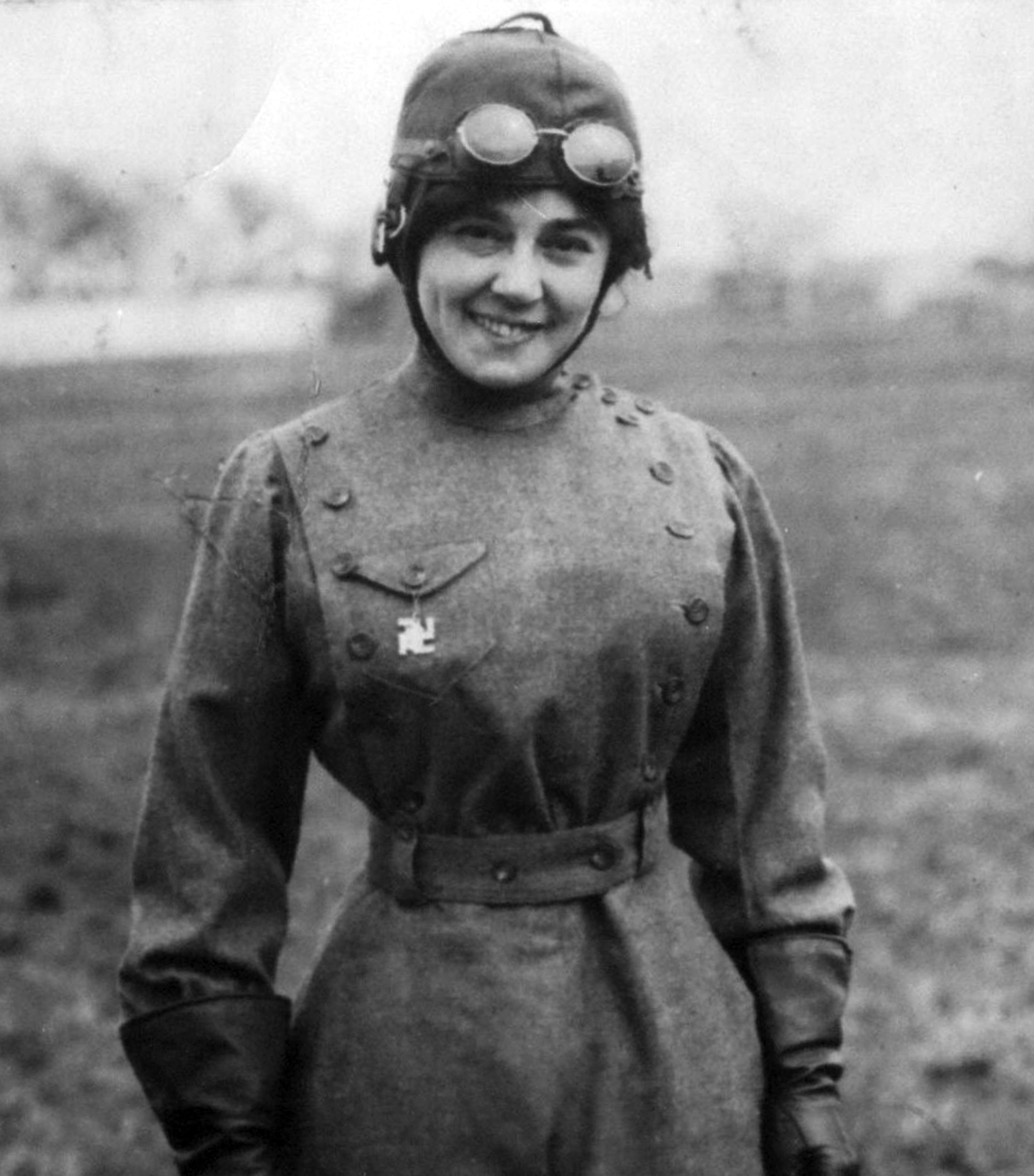
Matilde Moisant 1912

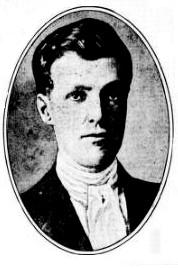
Albert Jewell

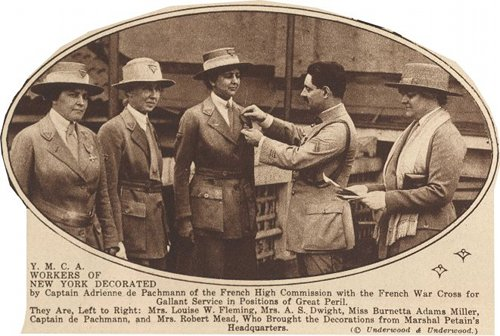
Bernetta Adams Miller {center} 1918
