= Eugen von Trauschenfels =

Transylvanian publicist

Johann Karl Eugen Trausch von Trauschenfels
- Born: 3 March 1833; Brașov, Austrian Empire
- Died: 20 February 1903 (aged 69); Brașov, Austria-Hungary
- Other names: Eugen Trausch-Trauschenfels
- Occupations: Publicist, jurist, editor, politician
- Known for: Opposition to Magyarization; member of the Imperial Council and the Diet of Hungary
- Parent: Georg Friedrich Trausch von Trauschenfels
- Relatives: Franz von Trauschenfels (cousin)

Johann Karl Eugen Trausch von Trauschenfels (3 March 1833, Brașov – 20 February 1903, Brașov) was a Transylvanian publicist of The House of Trausch von Trauschenfels. He held various public offices in Brașov, contributed to several cultural periodicals, and served as a deputy in both the Transylvanian and Hungarian diets. As a representative of the Transylvanian Saxons, he opposed Magyarization policies and later held a position in the Austrian Supreme Evangelical Council.

== Biography ==
Eugen Trausch von Trauschenfels came from the Trausch family, originally from the town of Aiud (Hungarian: Nagyenyed, German: Straßburg am Mieresch), which had been established in Transylvania since the early 17th century. His father, Georg Friedrich Trausch von Trauschenfels, was a member of the senate in Brașov. His cousin, Franz von Trauschenfels (1795–1871), was an official, historian, and politician. Eugen lost his mother at an early age, and his father died in 1839. He was then raised by his aunt, Karoline von Salmen.

He attended the Evangelical Gymnasium in Brașov. In 1846, he transferred to Sibiu, where he completed the upper gymnasium in 1851 and enrolled at the law academy in Sibiu. In 1852, he moved to the university in Vienna. During his studies, he collaborated with the editorial staff of Österreichische Blätter für Kunst und Literatur (Austrian Papers for Art and Literature). From 1859, he published the Magazin für Geschichte, Literatur und alle Denk - und Merkwürdigkeiten (Magazine for History, Literature, and All Intellectual and Curious Matters).

After finishing his law studies, in December 1855 he took a post at the local governor's office in Oradea (then called Großwardein). In July 1856, he became a conceptual trainee, and by January 1857, he was appointed full judicial actuary at the district court in Beiuș (Hungarian: Belényes). However, in February 1857, he resigned and, together with his brother Johann Peter Franz, opened a law firm in Brașov. That same year, he obtained a doctorate in law.

From autumn 1860 to March 1861, he served as actuary of the Evangelical presbytery in Brașov and sat on the consistory of the Evangelical Church in Transylvania’s Brașov district. In 1861, he was appointed magistrate secretary in Brașov. In 1863, he became editor of the Kronstädter Zeitung (Kronstadt Newspaper). At the beginning of 1866, he was appointed actuary in Brașov, a position he held until September 1872, when he became chief notary of the city.

Between 1867 and 1868, he was also a member of the Saxon National University in Transylvania — a self-governing cultural and administrative institution of the Transylvanian Saxons, despite its name implying an educational function.

With the restoration of constitutional government in the 1860s, he also entered national politics. He was elected to the Transylvanian Diet, where he served from 1863 to 1864, and again in 1865 in the Diet of Cluj. According to some sources, he served in the Cluj assembly from 1865 to 1866. He was also a delegate to the Imperial Council (Reichsrat) of the Austrian Empire, elected by the Transylvanian Diet in 1864 (the Reichsrat was still an indirectly elected body at that time). He took his oath on 12 November 1864. During his time in the Vienna parliament, he was listed as Dr. Eugen Trausch-Trauschenfels, court secretary in Brașov.

After the Austro-Hungarian Compromise of 1867, he temporarily withdrew from politics but remained active in cultural and national circles. He contributed to publications such as Der sächsische Hausfreund (The Saxon Household Friend) and other printed works. In the early 1870s, he accepted a mandate in the Diet of Hungary, where he served until the early 1880s. He was a leading figure in the Transylvanian Saxon resistance against Magyarization policies and efforts to curtail the autonomy of the Saxon National University.

In the 1880s, he is noted as a lay member of the Austrian Supreme Evangelical Council. He was appointed to the council in 1876, though some sources place his appointment in the early 1880s. He remained in this top governing body of the Austrian Evangelical Church until a few years before his death. Due to his church leadership role, he relocated to Vienna. In 1896, he was awarded the honorary title of Court Councillor. After retiring, he returned to his native Brașov.

He died on 20 February 1903.
