= Bunești, Brașov =

Bunești
- Commune
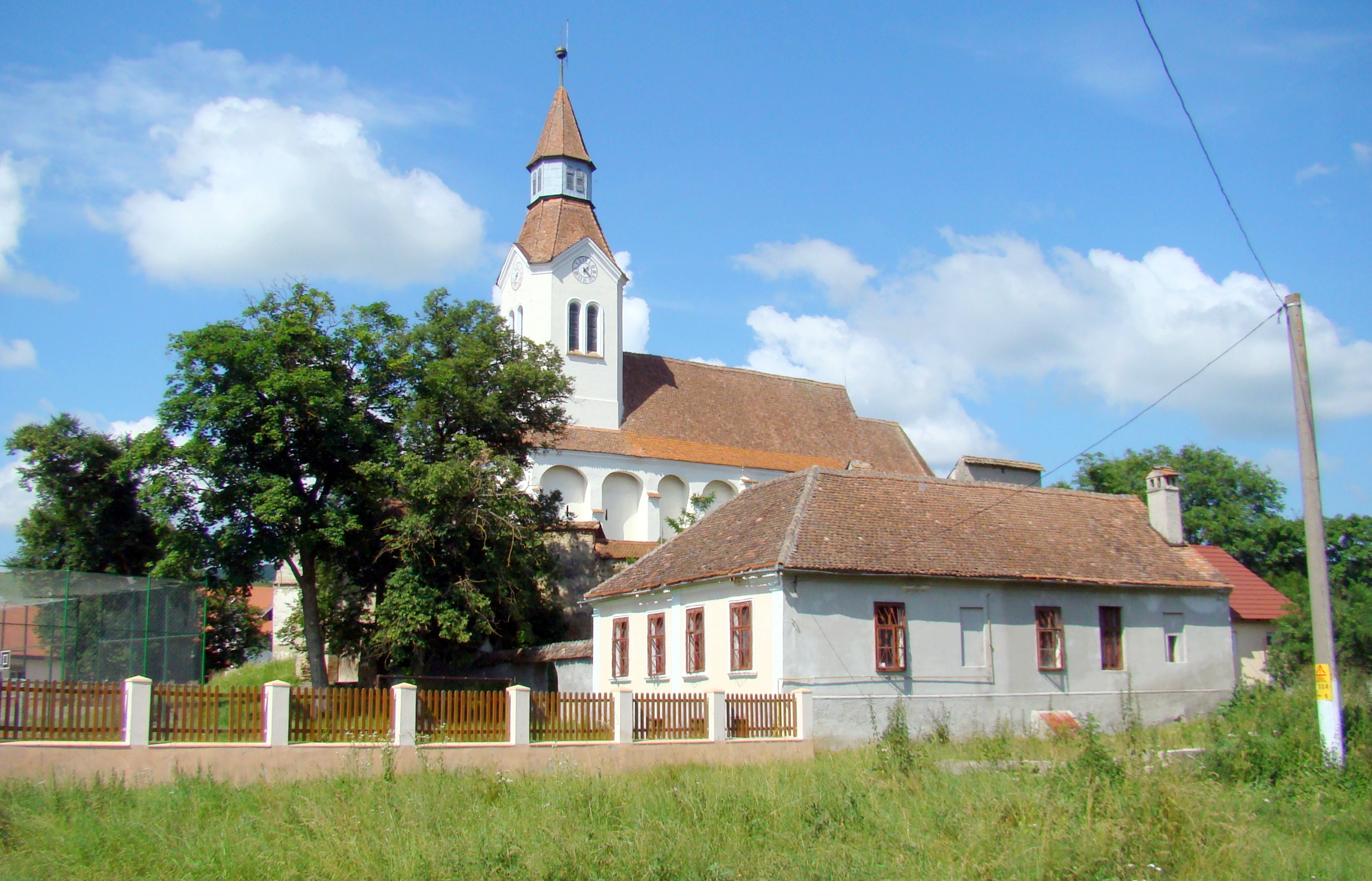
- Fortified Lutheran church in Bunești

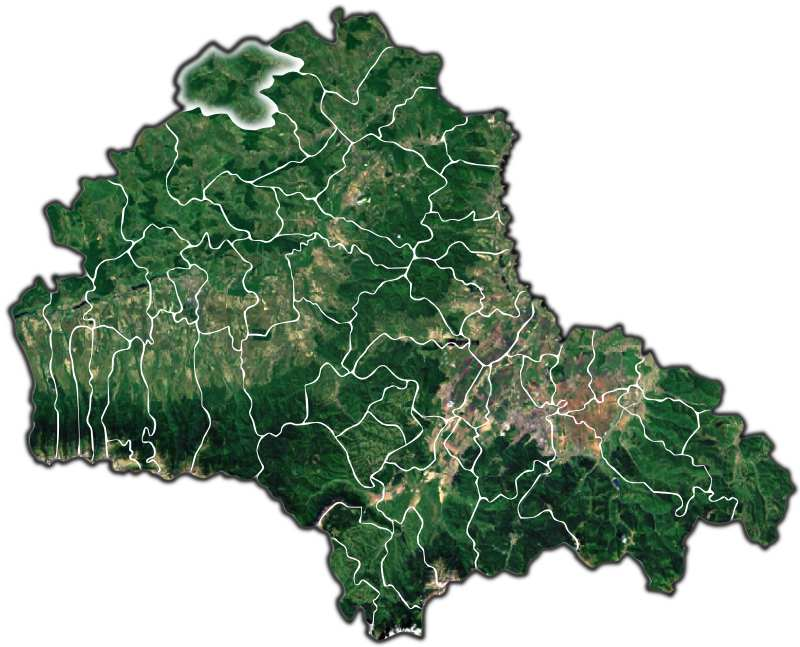
- Location within the county

- Location in Romania
- Coordinates: 46°06′26″N 25°03′39″E
- Country: Romania
- County: Brașov

Government
  - Mayor (2020–2024): Mircea Pălășan (PNL)
- Area: 149.10 km^{2} (57.57 sq mi)
- Elevation: 496 m (1,627 ft)
- Population (2021-12-01): 2,498
  - Density: 16.75/km^{2} (43.39/sq mi)
- Time zone: UTC+02:00 (EET)
  - Summer (DST): UTC+03:00 (EEST)
- Postal code: 507035
- Area code: +(40) 02 68
- Vehicle reg.: BV
- Website: www.primariabunesti.ro

Bunești (formerly Bundorf; German: Bodendorf; Hungarian: Szászbuda) is a commune in Brașov County, Transylvania, Romania. It is composed of five villages: Bunești, Criț, Meșendorf, Roadeș, and Viscri. Each of these has a fortified church. The route of the Via Transilvanica long-distance trail passes through the villages Roadeș and Criț.

The commune is located in the northern part of the county, on the border with Mureș County. It is 82.7 km (51.4 mi) from Brașov, 57.4 km (35.7 mi) from Făgăraș, and 34.6 km (21.5 mi) from Sighișoara. The commune is at the watershed between the drainage basins of the Olt River and Târnava Mare River. The Gorgan River flows southeast through Viscri, towards the Cozd River, while the Scroafa River flows northeast through the Bunești and Criț villages, eventually discharging into the Târnava Mare.

Historical population
Year	Pop.	±%
2002	2,476	—
2011	2,357	−4.8%
2021	2,498	+6.0%
Source: Census data

== Villages ==
In Romanian	In German	In Hungarian
Bunești	Bodendorf	Szászbuda
Criț	Deutsch-Kreuz	Szászkeresztúr
Meșendorf	Meschendorf	Mese
Roadeș	Radenthal or Radeln	Rádos
Viscri	Deutschweißkirch/Deutsch-Weisskirch; Weißkirch/Weisskirch	Szászfehéregyháza

=== Viscri ===
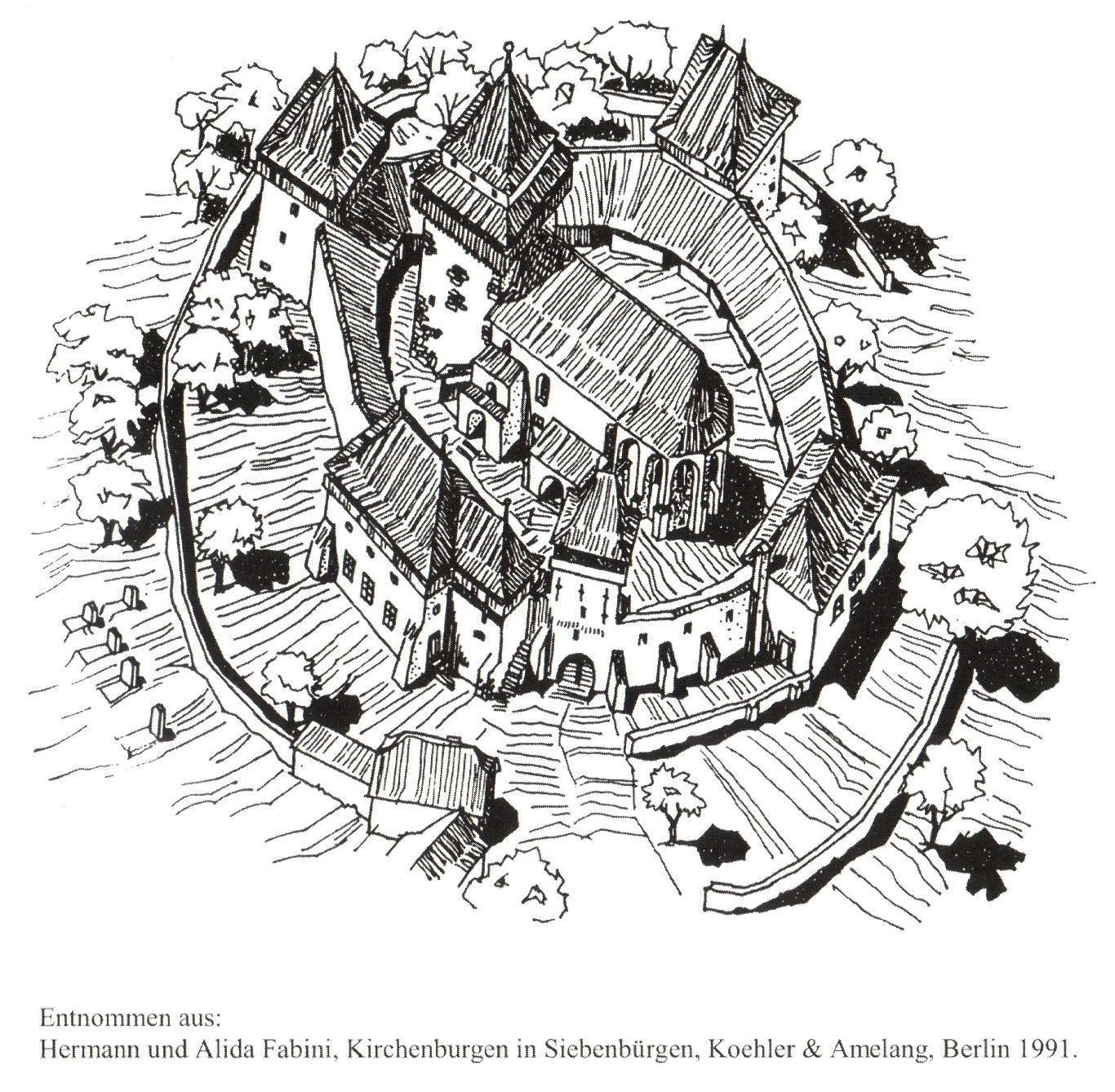
The Transylvanian Saxon Evangelical Lutheran fortified church of Viscri/Weisskirch (or Deutsch-Weisskirch) by Hermann and Alida Fabini (sketch published in 1991).

Viscri's population is of Roma majority, with a few Romanians, and about 20 Germans (namely Transylvanian Saxons) still left. It lies northwest of Rupea and can be reached through Dacia on a 7 km (4.3 mi) unpaved road. The village is best known for the highly fortified Viscri fortified church, originally built around 1100. It is one of over 150 Saxon villages with fortified churches in Transylvania, and one of the 7 designated in 1993 as a World Heritage Site by UNESCO. The first documentation of Viscri is a record of church taxes dated around 1400, in which the village is referred to as being part of the Rupea parish. Its inhabitants consisted of 51 farmers, 1 school master, 3 shepherds, and 2 paupers.

A brief footage of the fortified church of Viscri/Weisskirch, as seen from above.

The origins of the fortified church date from 1100 when the Székelys built a small church with a single hall and semicircular apse. Around 1185 the church was taken over by Saxon colonists, and the Székelys were forced to settle further north. In the 14th century the eastern part of the church was rebuilt and in 1525, the first fortifications with towers were added. In the 18th century the church was surrounded by a second defense wall. After 1743 a covered corridor for the storage of corn was built. A century later, two chambers in the defense corridor of the bastion were turned into school rooms. The classic 19th-century altar has as centerpiece "the Blessing of the Children" by the painter J. Paukratz from Rupea. The font was made from a capital of the 13th-century church. To this day, the church is surrounded by a cemetery with gravestones dating back to the "Bijelo Brdo culture".

In 2006, the Prince of Wales bought and restored two 18th-century Saxon houses in the Transylvanian villages of Mălâncrav and Viscri to help protect the unique way of life that has existed for hundreds of years and promote sustainable tourism. The buildings have been sensitively restored and converted into guesthouses for tourists. They remain in keeping with the surrounding architecture and feature a number of Transylvanian antiques but with modern facilities where possible. The renovation of these buildings has helped provide a sustainable future for the people of rural Transylvania while also enabling residents to maintain their traditional way of life.

== See also ==
- List of castles and fortresses in Romania
- Tourism in Romania
- Villages with fortified churches in Transylvania
