= Gorgan (river) =

- Location within Romania

Location
- Country: Romania
- Counties: Brașov County
- Villages: Viscri, Dacia

Physical characteristics
- Mouth: Cozd
  - location: Dacia
  - coordinates: 46.0124°N 25.1510°E

Basin features
- Progression: Cozd→ Homorod→ Olt→ Danube→ Black Sea

The Gorgan is a left tributary of the river Cozd in Romania. It flows into the Cozd in Dacia. Its length is 9 km (5.6 mi) and its basin size is 33 km^{2} (13 sq mi).
