= Wilhelm Berger (disambiguation) =

Wilhelm Berger (1861–1911) was a German composer.

Wilhelm Berger may also refer to:

- Wilhelm Georg Berger (1929–1993), Romanian composer
- Wilhelm Peterson-Berger (1867–1942), Swedish musician
