= Rupes (castra) =

- Castra of Rupea
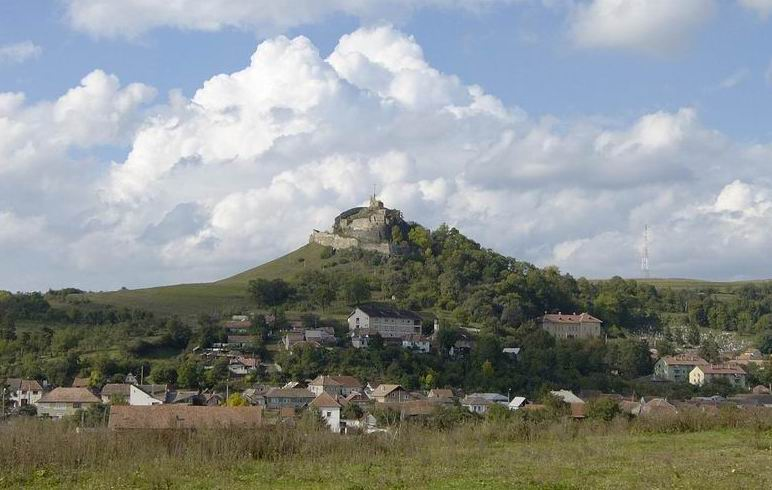

- Location within Romania
- 46°2′13.25″N 25°12′44.71″E
- Location: Rupea, Brașov, Romania

History
- Founded: 2nd century AD

Site notes
- Condition: Ruined

Rupes was a fort in the Roman province of Dacia near the present town of Rupea, Romania and on the site of Rupea Fortress.

== See also ==
- List of castra
