= Rupea Fortress =

Heritage site in Braşov County, Romania

- Cetatea Rupea
- Rupea, Brașov County in Romania
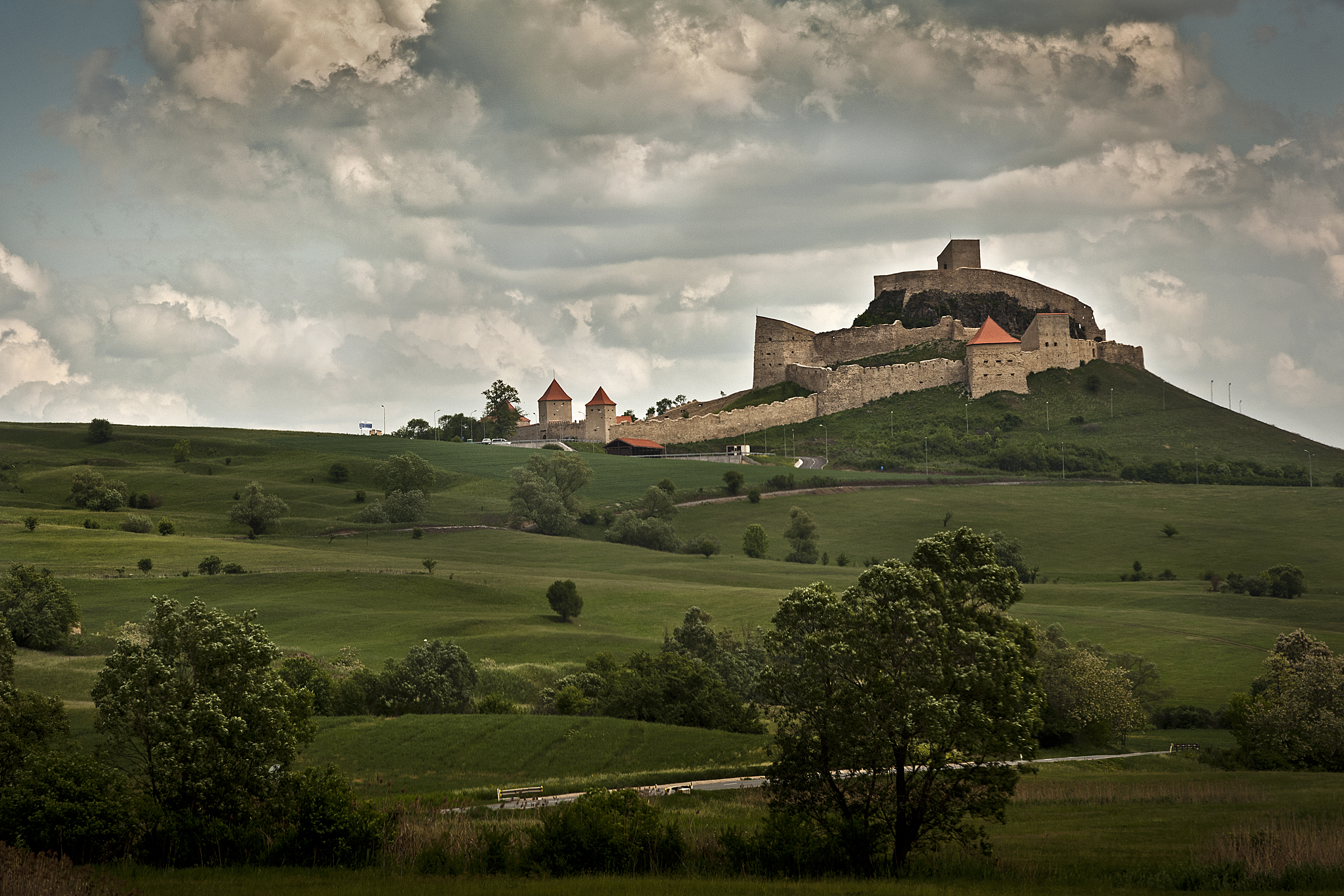
- Rupea Fortress

Site information
- Owner: Ministry of Culture
- Open to the public: 1 Nov–3 Mar, 9 a.m.–5 p.m. 1 Apr–31 May, 9 a.m.–8 p.m. 1 Jun–31 Aug, 9 a.m.–9 p.m. 1 Sep–31 Oct, 9 a.m.–7 p.m.
- Condition: Renovated

Location
- Location within Romania
- Coordinates: 46.03715°N 25.21241°E
- Area: 11 ha

Site history
- Built: 13th century
- In use: 1790
- Materials: Stone

Rupea Fortress (Romanian: Cetatea Rupea, German: Burg Reps, Hungarian: Kőhalmi vár) is a medieval fortress built by Transylvanian Saxons in the Kingdom of Hungary and first mentioned by a 1324 document. It is situated on a 120 m high basalt cliff, to the west of the Transylvanian town of Rupea in Romania. The fortress is located on DN13, 70 km from Brașov, on the road to Sighișoara. Following a period of restoration from 2010 to 2013, the fortress had over 10,000 monthly visitors by 2014.

== Etymology ==
The name Rupea comes from Latin rupes meaning "cliff", or "cleft stone".

The name under which the fortress was first mentioned in a 1324 document is castrum Kuholm, Kuholm referring to the rock on which it was built (in Hungarian, kőhalom means "pile of stones").

== History ==
=== Background ===
Rupea Fortress stands on one of the oldest archaeological sites in Romania, the first signs of human settlements dating from the Paleolithic and Early Neolithic (5500–3500 BC). Archaeological investigations have revealed objects from this era, testimony of settlements in the region: stone tools, pottery, funeral urns, etc.

In Dacian times, on these places was raised the dava known as Rumidava or Ramidava (after various historical sources); conquered by the Romans, Rumidava became the Roman castra Rupes (in Latin, rupes means "rock" or "stone"). The Roman castra Rupes was part of the Roman fortification belt defending the commercial area and routes linking the Târnava Valley with the Olt Valley, Râșnov and Hoghiz.

According to Romanian archaeologists, the current fortress might have been built on the ruins of a former Dacian defense fort, based on Dacian pottery sherds found at the site.

==== Legend ====
A popular legend in the area tells that Dacian king Decebalus committed suicide inside the fortress.

=== Fortress ===
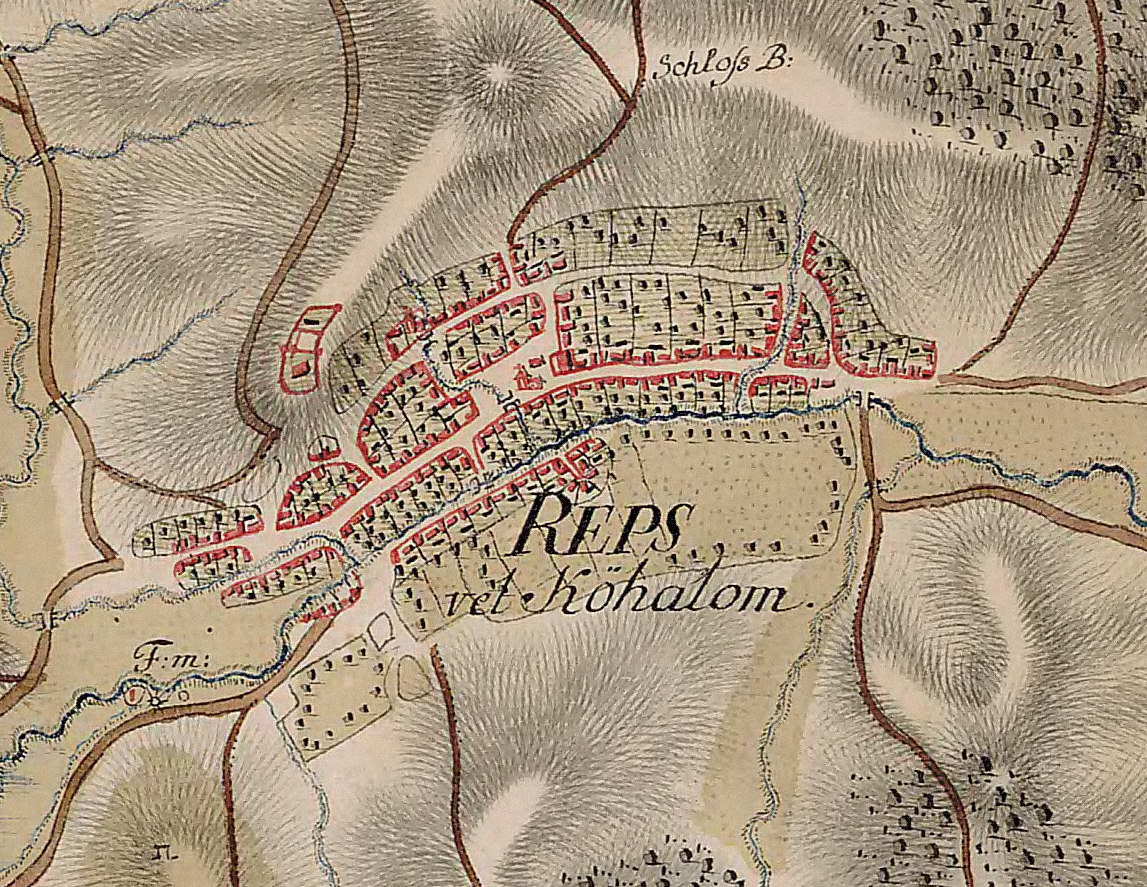
Rupea ("Reps") with a mention of its fortress ("Schloß") in the Josephine map of Transylvania

The first written mention of the fortress dates from 1324, under the name castrum Kuholm, when the Saxons revolting against King Charles I of Hungary took refuge inside the fortress. In the 14th century it had a key strategic role, being the main linking point between Transylvania, Moldavia and Wallachia. Between 1432 and 1437 the fortress was attacked and robbed by Turks, and finally abandoned in 1643 after a devastating fire turned it into ruins. At the end of the same century, Saxons returned to the fortress to seek refuge. This time, the fortress was handed over to the Habsburg armies without armed resistance.

From the 13th through the 17th century, the fortress expanded as a result of population growth, which led to the final outline comprising three baileys.

During the plague of 1716, the fortress was used as a refuge for those who were not affected by the disease. In 1788 as a refuge against Turkish invasion. The fortress was finally abandoned in 1790 after a severe storm that destroyed its roof.

After that the fortress was left in ruins, in spite of Rupea becoming a major Saxon cultural center in the interwar period. During the Communist regime, the authorities planned the demolition of the fortress to exploit the basalt that forms the hill. The last attempt to restore the fortress dates back to 1954, but the idea was abandoned. In the early 1990s, the fortress was in a sorry state. Eventually, only one of the fortified towers was left standing. Between 2010 and 2013, the fortress underwent a comprehensive restoration process, with all four towers and the homes of the Saxon families of Reps (Rupea), which once used the fortress as a place of refuge, being restored.

The fortress is classified in the list of historical monuments of Brașov County under the code BV-II-a-A-11769.

== Construction and architecture ==
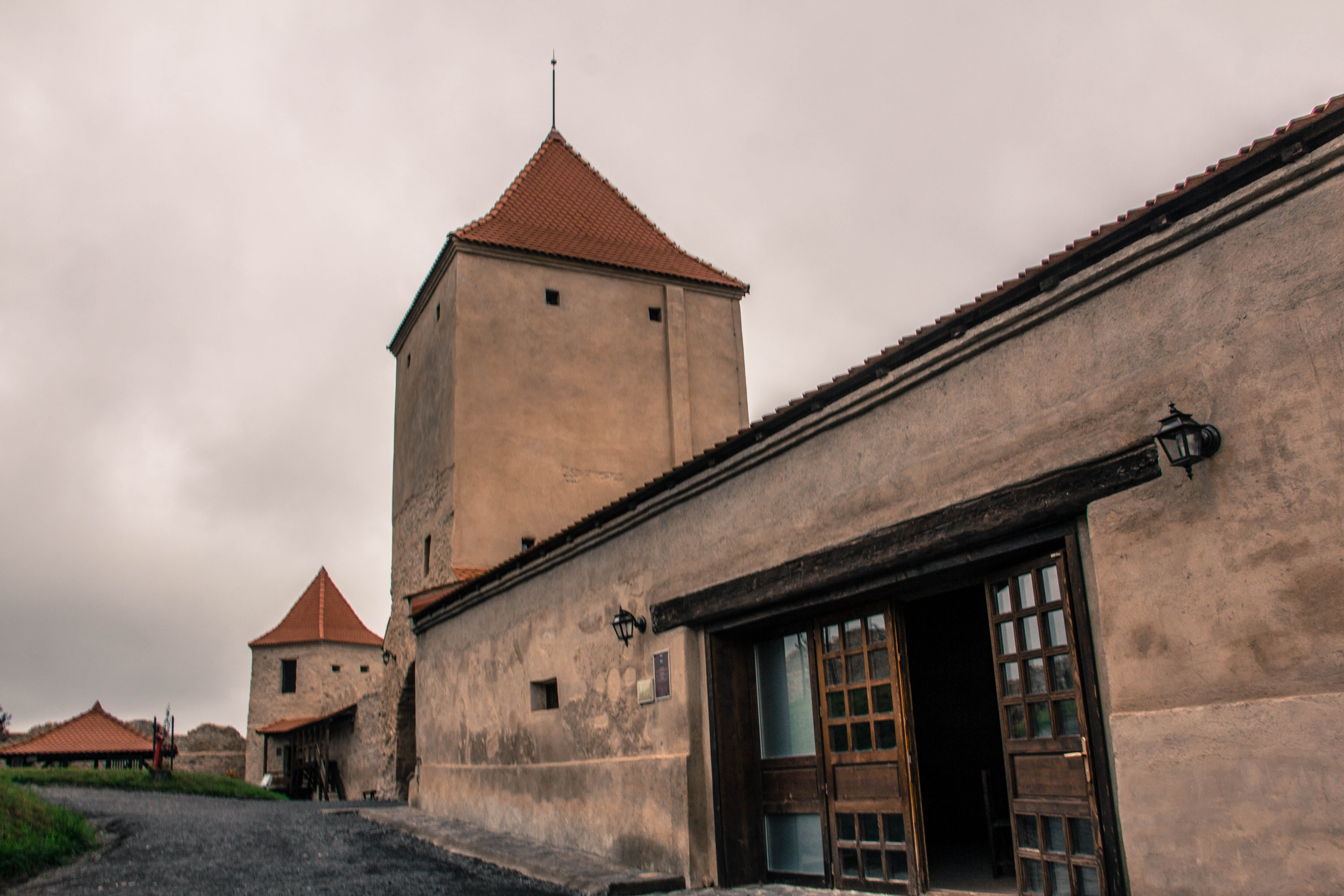
Gate Tower and "Speckturm" ("Bacon Tower", used for storing smoked pork and bacon)

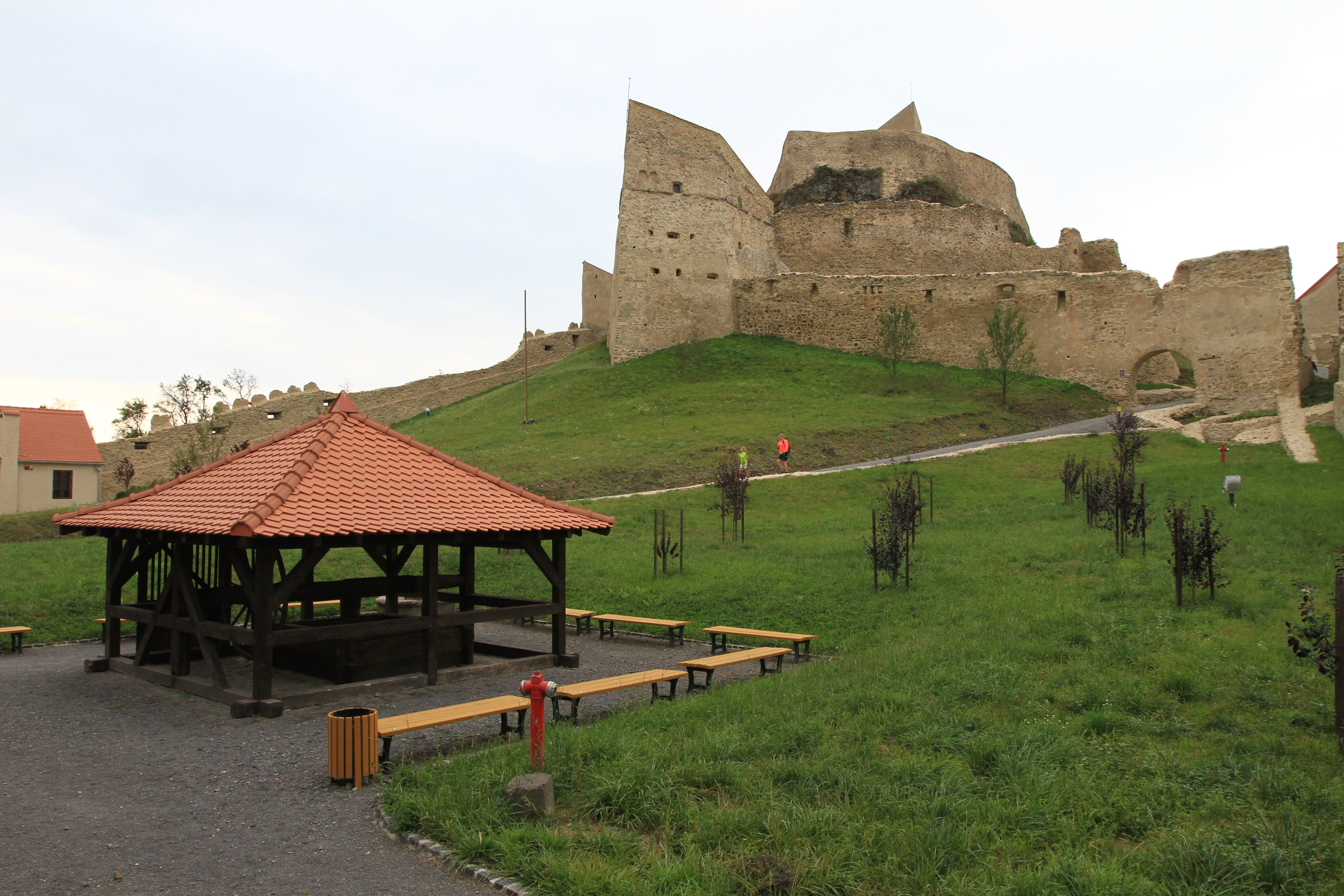
Inside view, from the well to the upper fortress

Rupea Fortress is 65 km from Brașov, built on a basalt massive, in the Cohalm Hill–Basalts of Rupea geological reserve. It is a Fliehburg, a fortified place of refuge for the population of nearby settlements, with four areas reinforced with polygonal towers. The fortress was modified over time, by adding two interior courtyards and three defense towers. The fortress is built in four concentric wards: Upper fortress (Romanian: Cetatea de sus, ward I), Middle fortress (Romanian: Cetatea de mijloc, wards II and III) and Lower fortress (Romanian: Cetatea de jos, ward IV).

Each is characterized by a particular belt of brickwork, corresponding to the era of its construction, marked by the evolution of weapons, siege techniques, or level of development of the settlement and the governmental seat on which the financing of work depended. In turn, the towers have individual names, some of which refer to a certain feature (often related to the function) resulting from their historical development. The different elements of the fortress exhibit various proportions and architectural features: the oldest had battlements in rectangular zigzags (which still need to be preserved), and the most recent had more decorative semicircular merlons. The embrasures took the form of simple slots, and the openings for firearms were made to allow the most excellent possible angle of fire, or, at the base of the walls, fit in prominent niches, with arrangements of stepped pyramids. Behind the walls, traces of brickwork reveal the foundations of watch walkways, sometimes on two levels.

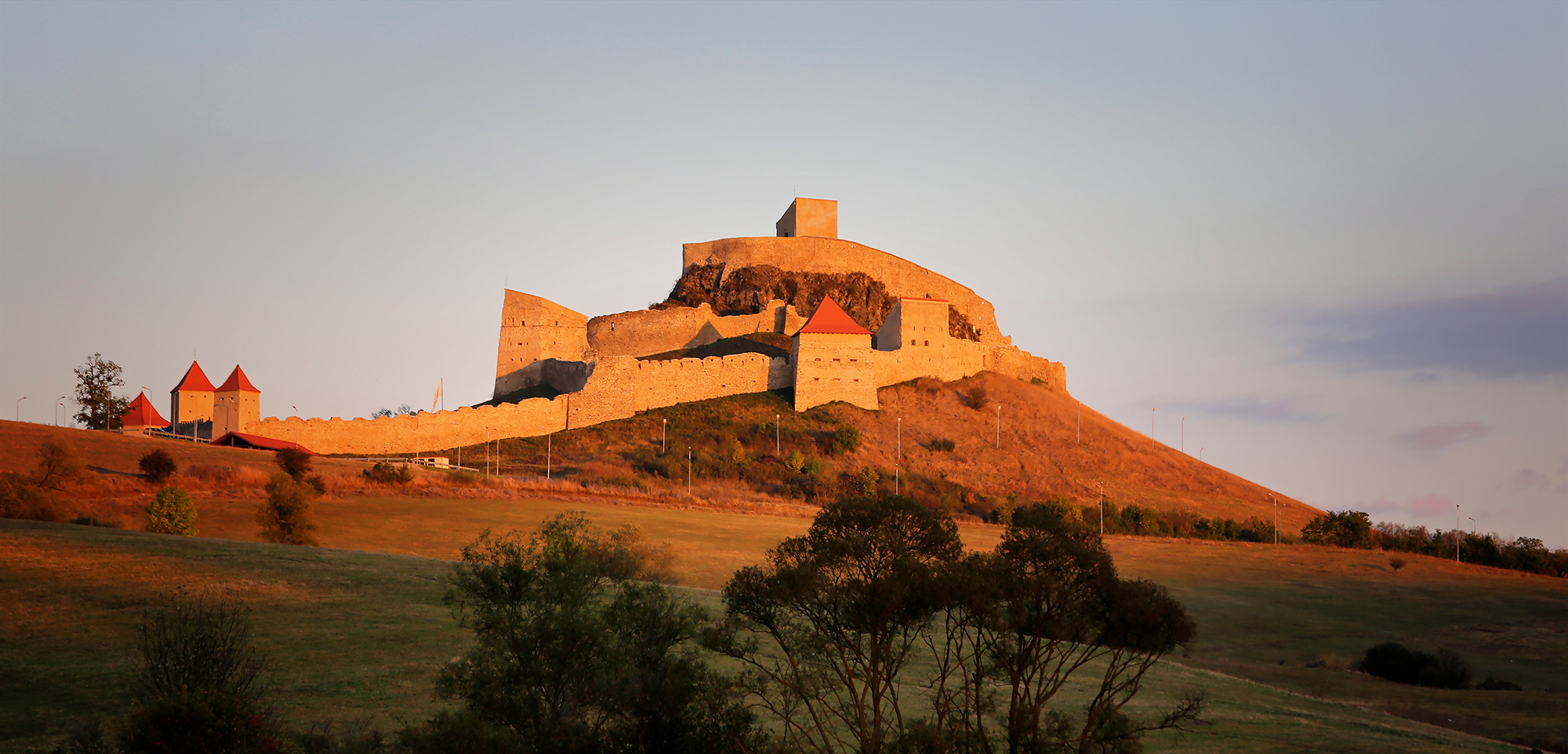
Rupea Fortress at sunset

The first ward of the fortification system is the Upper fortress which dates from the prefeudal period, 10th–13th centuries. It contains the latest additions, including the Bacon Tower (Romanian: Turnul Slăninii), specific to Saxon communities. Also here can be found the 59 meter deep well, the only source of water certainly identified in the fortress. The well was built in 1623, requiring several months of work, during the reign of Prince Gabriel Bethlen. The upper fortress has an area of over 1,500 m^{2}. The entrance to the upper fortress was a narrow corridor, the gate under the Gunpowder Tower (Romanian: Turnul Pulberăriei). To the inside can be observed traces of rooms that served as homes for the refugee population in the fortress during sieges. The best-known rooms in the upper fortress are the Count's room (Romanian: Camera judelui) and the Priest's room, but these are very difficult to identify nowadays.

The Middle fortress was built in the 15th century and was enlarged in the 18th century. Here can be identified the Tower with Bars (Romanian: Turnul cu Gratii), the Chapel and another pentagonal tower, gateway to the middle fortress, which is unique in Europe. The chapel is a large building, its last known restoration in 1718. It had multiple roles, including that of a Lutheran chapel, soberly decorated in typical Protestant style.

The Lower fortress was built starting in the 18th century. From this period dates the house of the fortress's watchman (1850) and the magazine, built in the early 19th century.

Rupea Fortress has the form of an ascending spiral (snail shell).

== Restoration ==
In the 1990s, Rupea Fortress was in ruins. Local authorities decided to seek EU funds for the restoration of the fortress and invested 32 million lei in restoring the historical monument. The Ministry of Regional Development and Public Administration, The Regional Development Agency Centru and Rupea Local Council signed a financing contract in 2009, with grant funding for the project of restoration and expansion of the tourism infrastructure of Rupea. Within this project was included the restoration of the abandoned fortress of Rupea. The work took three years, and the fortress was reopened to the public on 15 June 2013. Restored elements included the walls, the interior courtyard and the towers. In 2013, Rupea Fortress was visited by 61,000 tourists, in 2014 by 115,000 tourists, and in the first quarter of 2015 the figure exceeded 150,000 visitors.

Both the Rupea Town Hall and Brașov County Council want to introduce the objective in a circuit targeting Brașov, Sibiu and Sighișoara and to organize national cultural events that highlight the destination better. The first event took place in the summer of 2013, a festival dedicated to composer Wilhelm Georg Berger, born in 1929 in Rupea.
