= Cozd =

Cozd Valea Mare, Kosder, Kosbach
- Location within Romania

Location
- Country: Romania
- Counties: Brașov County
- Villages: Lovnic, Jibert, Dacia, Rupea

Physical characteristics
- Mouth: Homorod
  - location: Homorod
  - coordinates: 46.0334°N 25.2780°E
- Length: 35 km (22 mi)
- Basin size: 273 km^{2} (105 sq mi)

Basin features
- Progression: Homorod→ Olt→ Danube→ Black Sea

The Cozd, also Valea Mare or Steana (German: Kosder, Kosbach, Hungarian: Kosd-patak) is a right tributary of the river Homorod in Romania It discharges into the Homorod in the village Homorod. Its length is 35 km (22 mi) and its basin size is 273 km^{2} (105 sq mi).

== Tributaries ==
The following rivers are tributaries to the river Cozd:

- Left: Luncșoara, Obârșița, Gorgan, Fișer, Paloș
- Right: Lovnic
