= Claudiu M. Florian =

Romanian writer

Claudiu Mihail Florian (born 1969) is a Romanian writer. He was born in Rupea in Brașov County and received a degree in German Studies from the University of Bucharest in 1994. After earning an MA degree from the same university in 1996, he obtained a second master's from Bielefeld University. Since 2002, he has worked in various diplomatic positions in Berlin and Bern.

Florian is also an award-winning writer. His book Vârstele jocului. Strada Cetății (The Ages of the Game – Citadel Street), published in 2012 by Cartea Românească, won the European Union Prize for Literature in 2016.
