= Fișer =

- Location within Romania

Location
- Country: Romania
- Counties: Brașov County
- Villages: Fișer, Rupea

Physical characteristics
- Mouth: Cozd
  - location: Rupea
  - coordinates: 46.0312°N 25.2120°E
- Length: 11 km (6.8 mi)
- Basin size: 40 km^{2} (15 sq mi)

Basin features
- Progression: Cozd→ Homorod→ Olt→ Danube→ Black Sea
- Tributaries
  - left: Gherghelău

The Fișer is a left tributary of the river Cozd in Romania. It discharges into the Cozd in Rupea. Its length is 11 km (6.8 mi) and its basin size is 40 km^{2} (15 sq mi).
