= Wilhelm Georg Berger =

Romanian composer, musicologist, violist and conductor

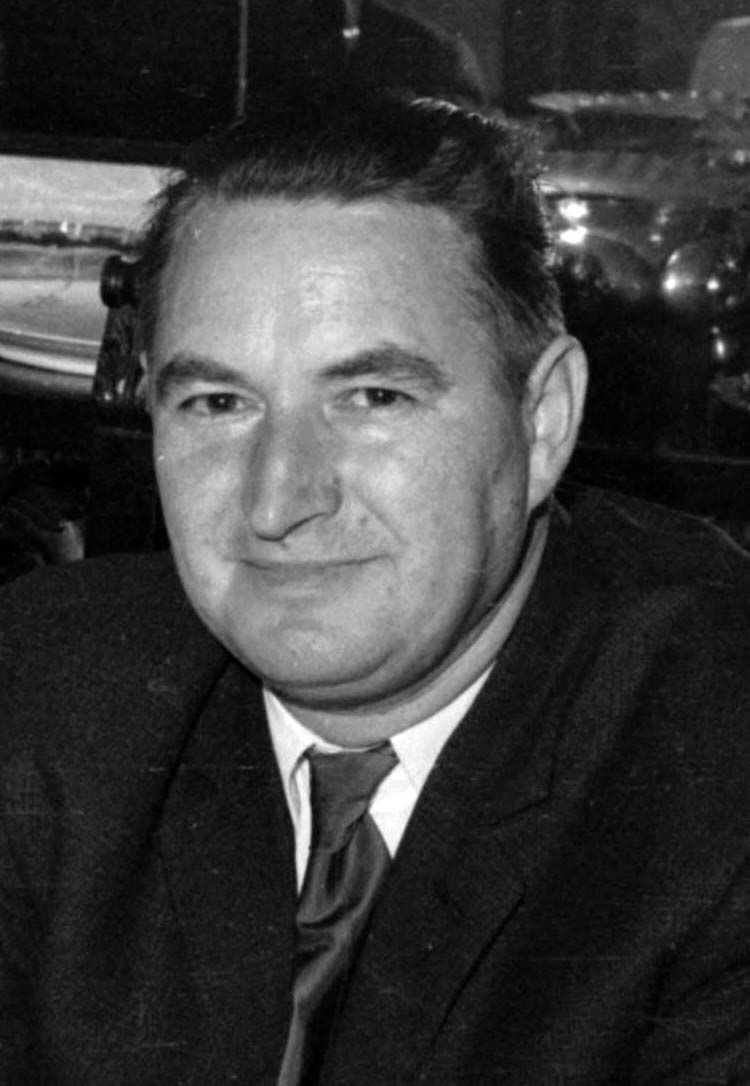
Wilhelm Georg Berger in 1970

Wilhelm Georg Berger (born 4 December 1929, Rupea; died 8 March 1993, Bucharest) was a Romanian composer, musicologist, violist and conductor.

== Biography ==
Berger was born in Rupea, Romania. He learned to play the violin and viola under the instruction of Cecilia Nitulescu-Lupu, Anton Adrian Sarvaş, and Alexandru Rădulescu. He was a violist with the George Enescu Philharmonic Orchestra and was also a member of the Romanian Composer Association string quartet.

He was elected a corresponding member of the Romanian Academy in 1991.

== Works ==
Berger had a prolific career as a composer. Among his numerous compositions were 24 symphonies, 21 string quartets, oratories, sonatas, concertos, and organ and mass pieces, a number of which garnered him notable awards. He won the Prince Rainier III Composition Award in Monaco for a violin sonata in 1964, and First Prize in Liège in 1965 for his Sixth String Quartet. One of his violin concertos earned him the First Prize in Brussels in 1966. Several of his works are published by the Romanian record label Electrecord, such as his Tenth Symphony.

His musicological work consists of, among others, a series of books about the artistic qualities of sonatas, another series about string quartets, a guidebook for concertos and books about classical composition theory.
