= Villages with fortified churches in Transylvania =

Churches in Romania

UNESCO World Heritage Site
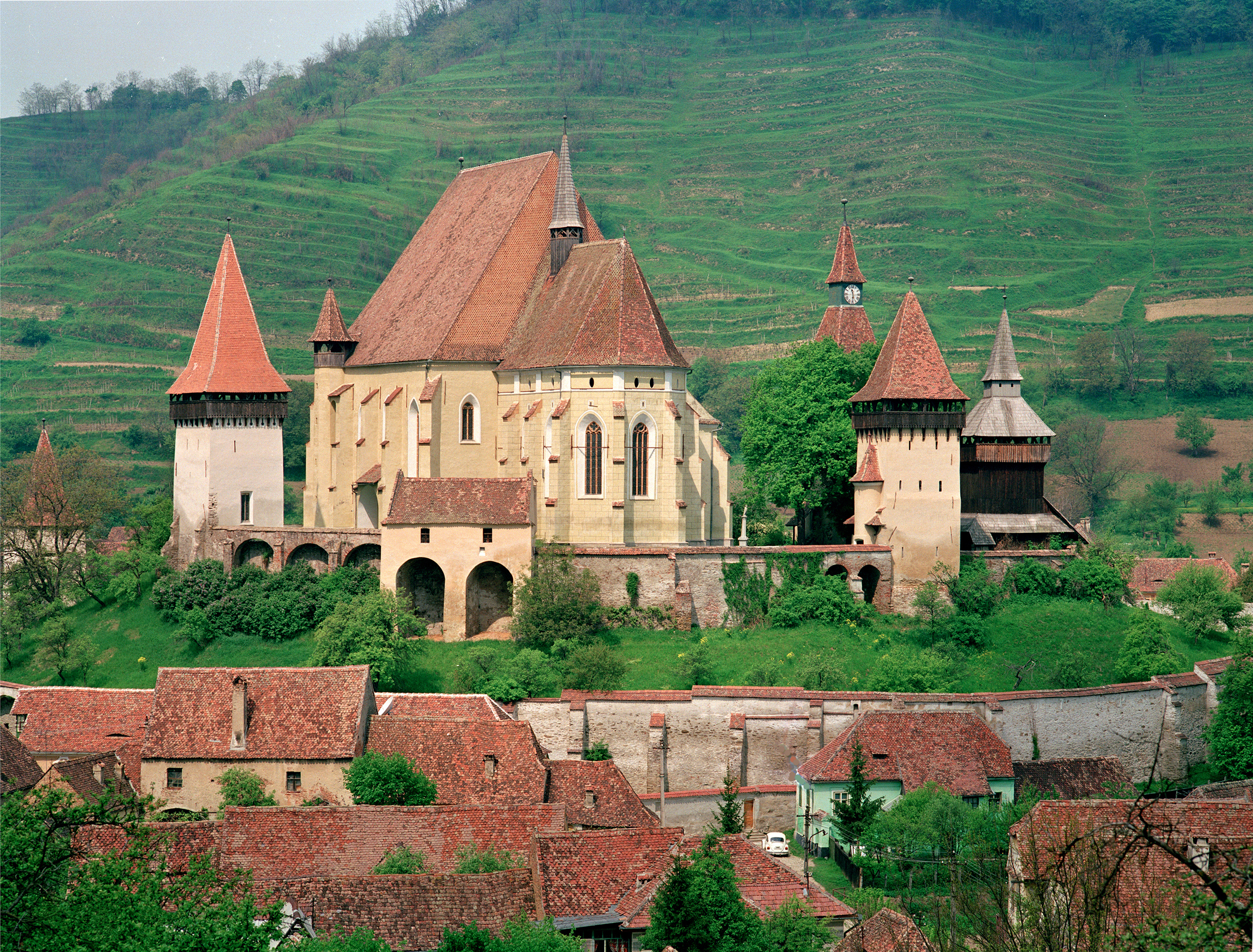
- Biertan village and fortified church
- Location: Transylvania, Romania
- Criteria: Cultural: iv
- Reference: 596
- Inscription: 1993 (17th Session)
- Extensions: 1999
- Fortified churches: 1 = Biertan-Birthälm, 2 = Prejmer-Tartlau, 3 = Viscri-Weisskirch, 4 = Dârjiu-Székelyderzs, 5 = Saschiz-Keisd, 6 = Câlnic-Kelling, 7 = Valea Viilor-Wurmloch

The "Villages with Fortified Churches in Transylvania" UNESCO World Heritage Site consists of seven villages (six Saxon and one Székely) chosen from among over 150 such structures surviving in the Transylvania region of Romania. They are dominated by fortified churches and characterized by a specific settlement pattern that has been preserved since the Late Middle Ages.

Transylvania has one of the highest concentrations of fortified churches that survive from the 13th to 16th centuries. Of the original 300, more than 150 well preserved fortified churches are surviving until today, displaying a great variety of architectural styles. Seven from among them, representing various types, have been selected by the World Heritage Committee and listed as a World Heritage Site.

== History ==
The Saxon villages of Transylvania appeared in the twelfth century when the Kings of Hungary settled German colonists in the area. They had a special status among nations in the province and their civilisation managed to survive and thrive, forming a very strong community of farmers, artisans and merchants. Being situated in a region constantly under the threat of the Ottoman and Tatar invasions, they built fortifications of different sizes. The most important towns were fully fortified, and the smaller communities created fortifications centered on the church, where they added defensive towers and storehouses to keep their most valuable goods and to help them withstand long sieges. The churches were surrounded with fortification walls strengthened by towers, creating church fortresses (Kirchenburgen in German), and sometimes the church buildings themselves were transformed into defendable forts (Wehrkirchen) by blocking unprotected openings and adding elements of military architecture to the houses of worship, such as towers (or additional floors to existing clocktowers), chemins de ronde, battlements, bretèches, loopholes, etc.

== The list ==
From among the more than 150 Transylvanian villages whose fortified churches are still preserved (see List of fortified churches in Transylvania), the seven listed as a UNESCO World Heritage Site are:

Romanian name	Image	County	German name	Hungarian name	Main attractions
Biertan		Sibiu	Birthälm	Berethalom	Biertan fortified church
Câlnic		Alba	Kelling	Kelnek	Câlnic Citadel
Dârjiu		Harghita	Ders	Székelyderzs	Dârjiu fortified church
Prejmer		Brașov	Tartlau	Prázsmár	Prejmer fortified church
Saschiz		Mureș	Keisd	Szászkézd	Saschiz fortified church Saschiz peasant citadel
Valea Viilor		Sibiu	Wurmloch	Nagybaromlak	Valea Viilor fortified church
Viscri		Brașov	Weißkirch	Fehéregyháza	Viscri fortified church

== Description ==
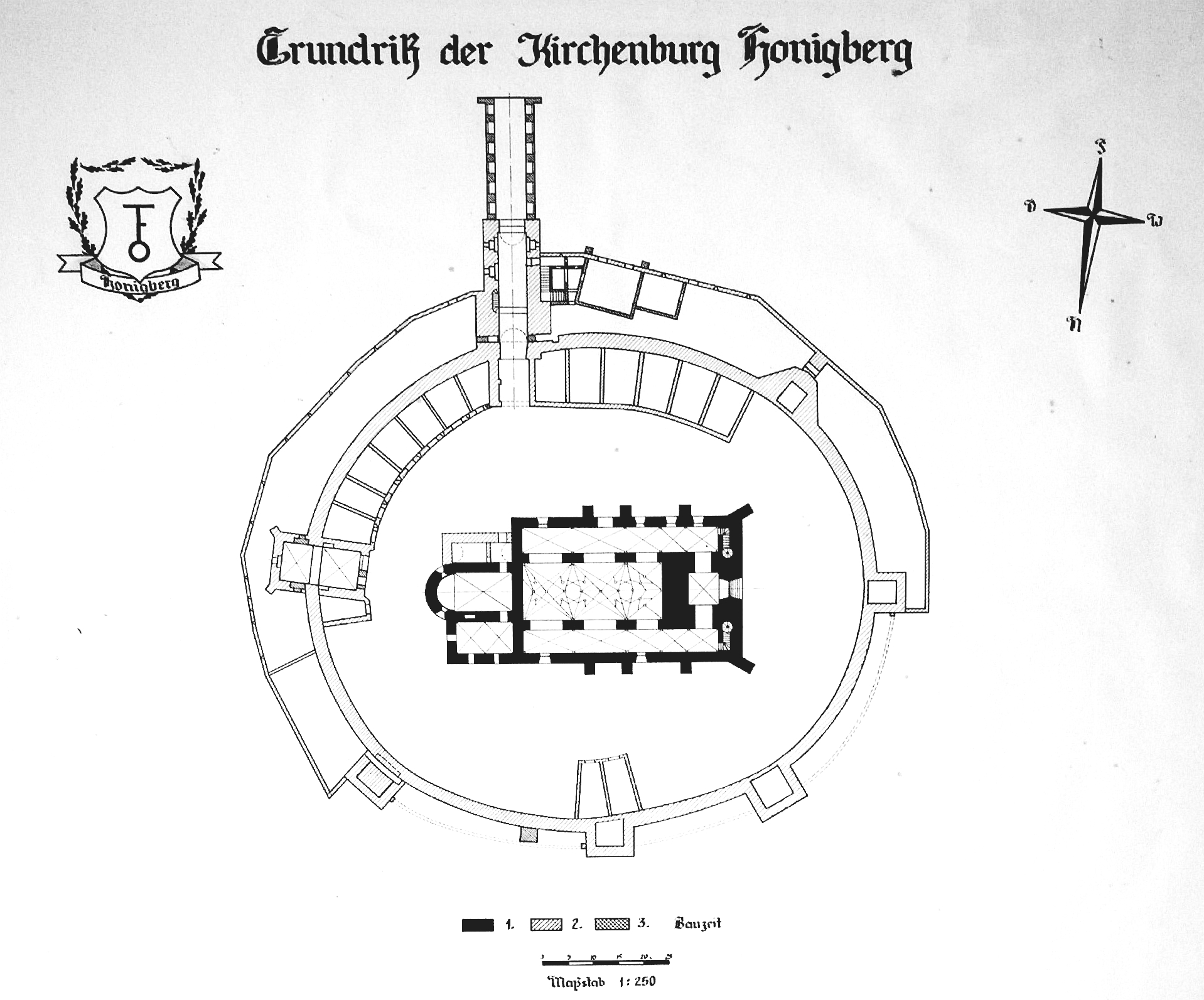
Hărman

The topography in Southern Transylvania is that of a plateau, cut by wide valleys of various small rivers that flow into larger ones, namely the Olt River, Mureș River, Târnava Mare River and Târnava Mică River. The villages follow the topography closely and try to make the best of it; thus villages situated in a valley developed around a central street and possibly some secondary ones, while those situated on a flatter spot follow a looser, radial pattern. Due to security reasons and the traditions of the Saxon inhabitants, the villages are compact.

The main element is the church, always situated in the middle of the town. Different types of fortifications can be found: a small enceinte around the church, a row of fortifications around the church or a real fortress with multiple fortification walls centered on the church. The churches have been adapted to include defensive functions; all of them are either Romanesque basilicas or single-nave churches of the late Gothic period. The churches often include many additions, ranging in age from the original period in which the churches were built Late Middle Ages to the sixteenth century. Many churches also include baroque elements from that period, as the baroque style was very popular in the region.

In almost all cases, the church is situated in an easily defendable position, generally on a hilltop. Elements of fortifications found in the main cities in the area have been adapted here, and they are a testimony of the building techniques used along the years by the Saxon community. Some fortifications had observation towers, some of them being church towers adapted to the needs of a fortress. The materials are the traditional ones, stone and red bricks, with a red clay tiled roof, a typical feature of the area.

Close to the church there is the main square of the village or Tanzplaz (Dance Square) to which social life gravitated. The only buildings situated next to the fortifications are those of communal use: the parish house, school, and village hall. The houses of the most wealthy villagers were situated around the central square. At most sites, barns for grain storage and rooms for all families in the community are situated inside the fortified complex.

== List of other villages with fortified churches in Transylvania ==
Romanian name	Image	County	German name	Hungarian name	Main attractions
Axente Sever		Sibiu	Frauendorf	Asszonyfalva	Axente Sever fortified church
Bazna		Sibiu	Baaßen	Bázna	Bazna fortified church
Boian		Sibiu	Bonnesdorf	Alsóbajom	Boian fortified church
Brateiu		Sibiu	Breitau	Baráthely	Brateiu fortified church
Cisnădie		Sibiu	Heltau	Nagydisznód	Cisnădie fortified church
Cristian		Sibiu	Großau	Kereszténysziget	Cristian fortified church
Lechința		Bistrița-Năsăud	Lechnitz	Szászlekence	Lechința fortified church
Ocna Sibiului		Sibiu	Salzburg	Vizakna	Ocna Sibiului fortified church
Senereuș		Mureș	Zendersch	Szénaverős	Senereuș fortified church
Şaroş pe Târnave		Sibiu	Scharosch an der Kokel	Szászsáros	Şaroş pe Târnave fortified church
Târnăvioara		Sibiu	Kleinprobsdorf	Kisekemező	Târnăvioara fortified church
Zăbala		Covasna	Gebissdorf	Zabola	Zăbala fortified church
Cisnădioara		Sibiu	Michelsberg	Kisdisznód	Cisnădioara fortified church
Bradu		Sibiu	Girelsau	Fenyőfalva	Bradu fortified church
Cincșor		Brașov	Kleinschenk	Kissink	Cincșor fortified church
Daia		Sibiu	Thalheim	Dolmány	Daia fortified church
Șeica Mică		Sibiu	Kleinschelken	Kisselyk	Șeica Mică fortified church
Țapu		Sibiu	Abtsdorf bei Marktschelken	Csicsóholdvilág	Țapu fortified church

== See also ==
- List of World Heritage Sites in Romania
- List of castles in Romania
- Tourism in Romania
