= Viscri fortified church =

Heritage site in Braşov County, Romania

- Biserica fortificată din Viscri
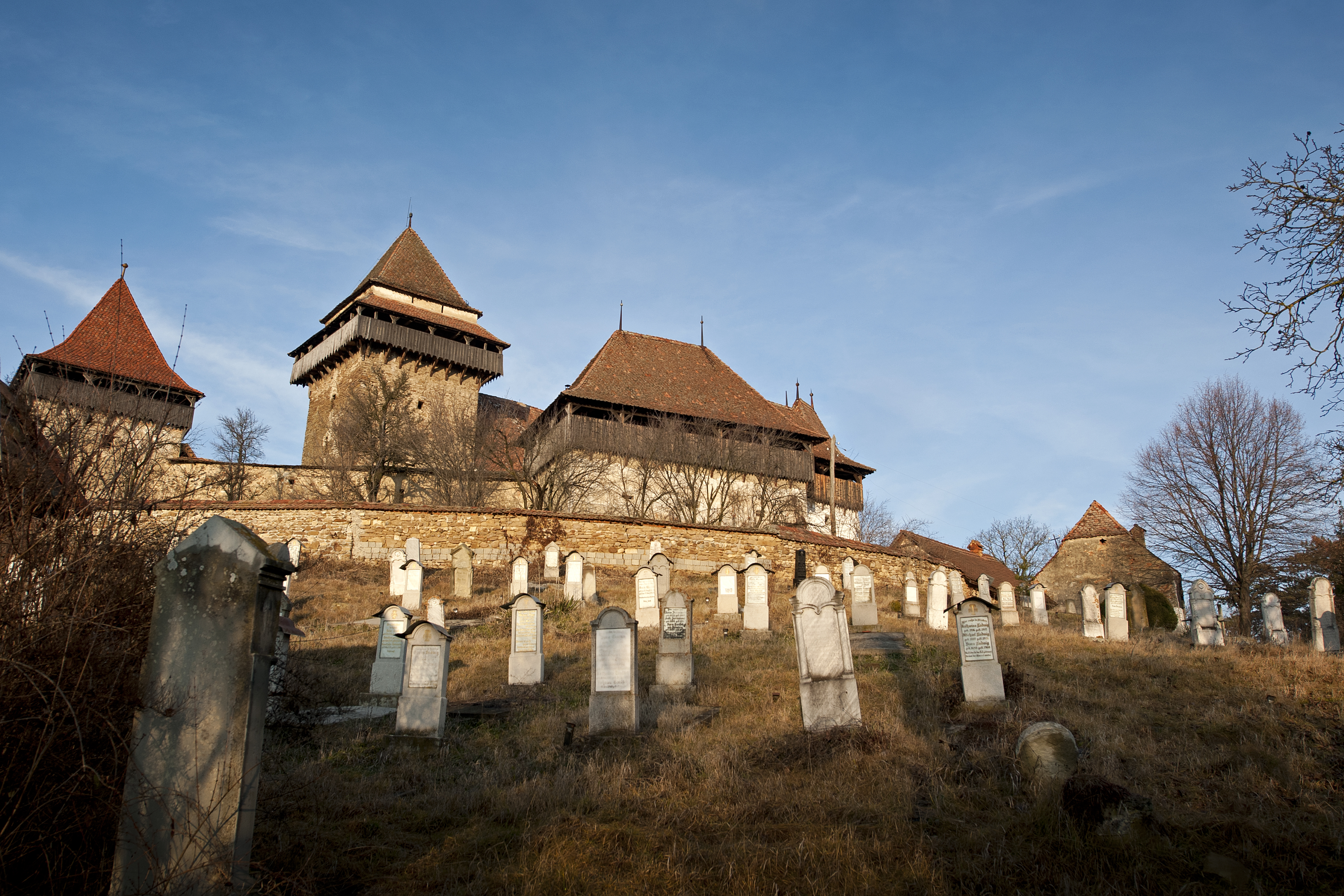

Religion
- Affiliation: Lutheran

Location
- Location: Viscri, Brașov County, Romania
- Interactive map of Viscri fortified church
- Coordinates: 46.054712°N 25.088622°E

Architecture
- Type: Fortified church
- Style: Romanesque
- Groundbreaking: 13th century
- UNESCO World Heritage Site
- Official name: Villages with fortified churches in Transylvania
- Type: Cultural
- Criteria: iv
- Designated: 1993 (17th session); 1999 (23rd session – Extension)
- Reference no.: 596
- State Party: Romania
- Region: Europe and North America
- Monument istoric
- Official name: Historic monuments in Brașov County
- Type: architectural
- Reference no.: LMI Code: BV-II-a-A-11843 (RAN Code: 40759.09)

The Viscri fortified church (Romanian: Biserica fortificată din Viscri; German: Kirchenburg von Deutsch-Weisskirch) is a Lutheran fortified church in Viscri (Deutsch-Weisskirch), Brașov County, in the Transylvania region of Romania. It was built by the ethnic German Transylvanian Saxon community at a time when the area belonged to the Kingdom of Hungary. Initially Roman Catholic, it became Lutheran following the Reformation. Together with the surrounding village, the church forms part of the villages with fortified churches in Transylvania UNESCO World Heritage Site.

== Description ==
=== Background and church ===
The Weisskirch ("white church") in the village's German name refers to a chapel built by the Székely inhabitants who lived there prior to the Saxons' arrival between 1141 and 1162, during the reign of Géza II. The building was rectangular, with a semicircular altar of greenish-white limestone. Four Romanesque capitals that survive in the choir, including one used as a baptismal font, also originate in this period. Coins and earrings found in graves both inside and outside the chapel were initially thought to date from the reign of Coloman (1095–1116), but a re-evaluation found that the oldest coin came from the late reign of Géza II, suggesting the remains were of Saxons rather than Székely.

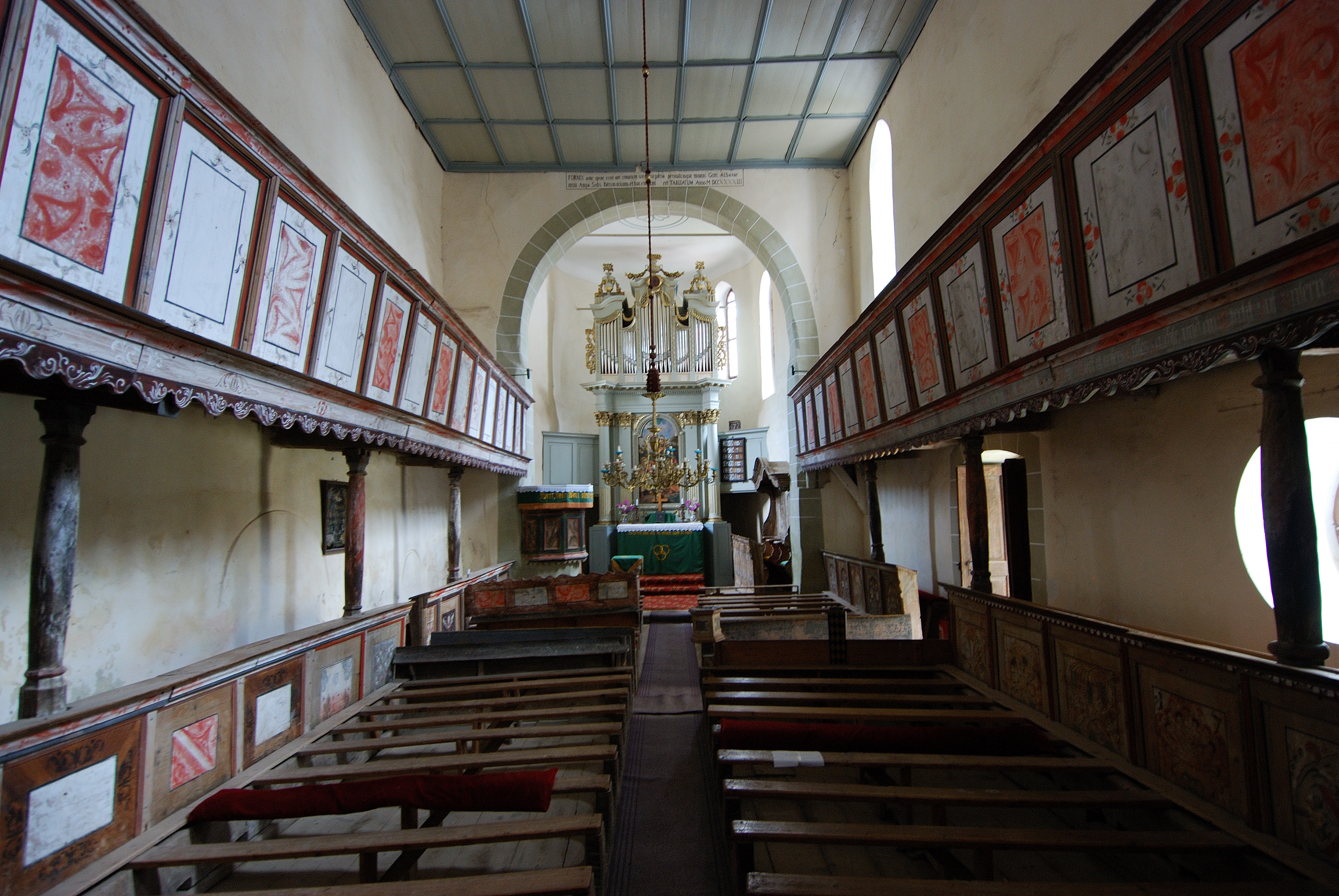
The hall church interior with its wooden gallery

In the 13th century, the Saxons built a Romanesque hall church that integrated the chapel but also introduced changes, such as a wooden seat gallery at the western end. The apse, its altar possibly of the Romanesque period, features a scalloped capital unique to Transylvania. The design was popular in 12th-century Germany but disappeared soon after reaching Austria, suggesting the church dates to no later than the first half of the 13th century.

In the 14th century the church became a community church. The apse was replaced by a larger trapezoidal choir. The church was fortified around 1500: the hall was lengthened and linked to the keep, formerly freestanding and probably belonging to the family of a count. Another level was added to the keep, used for bells and fitted with a battlement that stayed on corbels. The roof featured a sixth level with embrasures for firing. The choir's defensive level was demolished in 1743. Due to the peaceful nature of the period, the church battlement was taken down after that time, replaced by grain storerooms for the villagers. The interior ceiling has a ceiling divided into squares, also from 1743, around which time the austere furnishings were put in place.

=== Fortifications and recognition ===
Plan of the fortified church

In the 12th century, fortifications began to be built around the chapel. Forming an oval and made of river and field stone, the south, east and northeast walls have survived; these are 7 m in height. The entrance is through the southeast wall, to which two towers and two bastions were added in the 14th century. The south tower, built into the wall exterior, had three floors and a battlement resting on wooden corbels. Sharing a roof with the south bastion, the tower's lower levels were joined into a hall entered from the east. The topmost level kept its parapets, with their oak border and moveable logs that could shut in defenders. The south bastion battlement and roof were joined with those of the south tower.

In 1999, Viscri, together with five other places, was added to the already-listed Biertan to form the villages with fortified churches in Transylvania UNESCO World Heritage Site. Additionally, the church is listed as a historic monument by Romania's Ministry of Culture and Religious Affairs, with the following being listed as separate entries: the inner walls and towers, the outer walls, and a 19th-century outdoor space for festive dances.

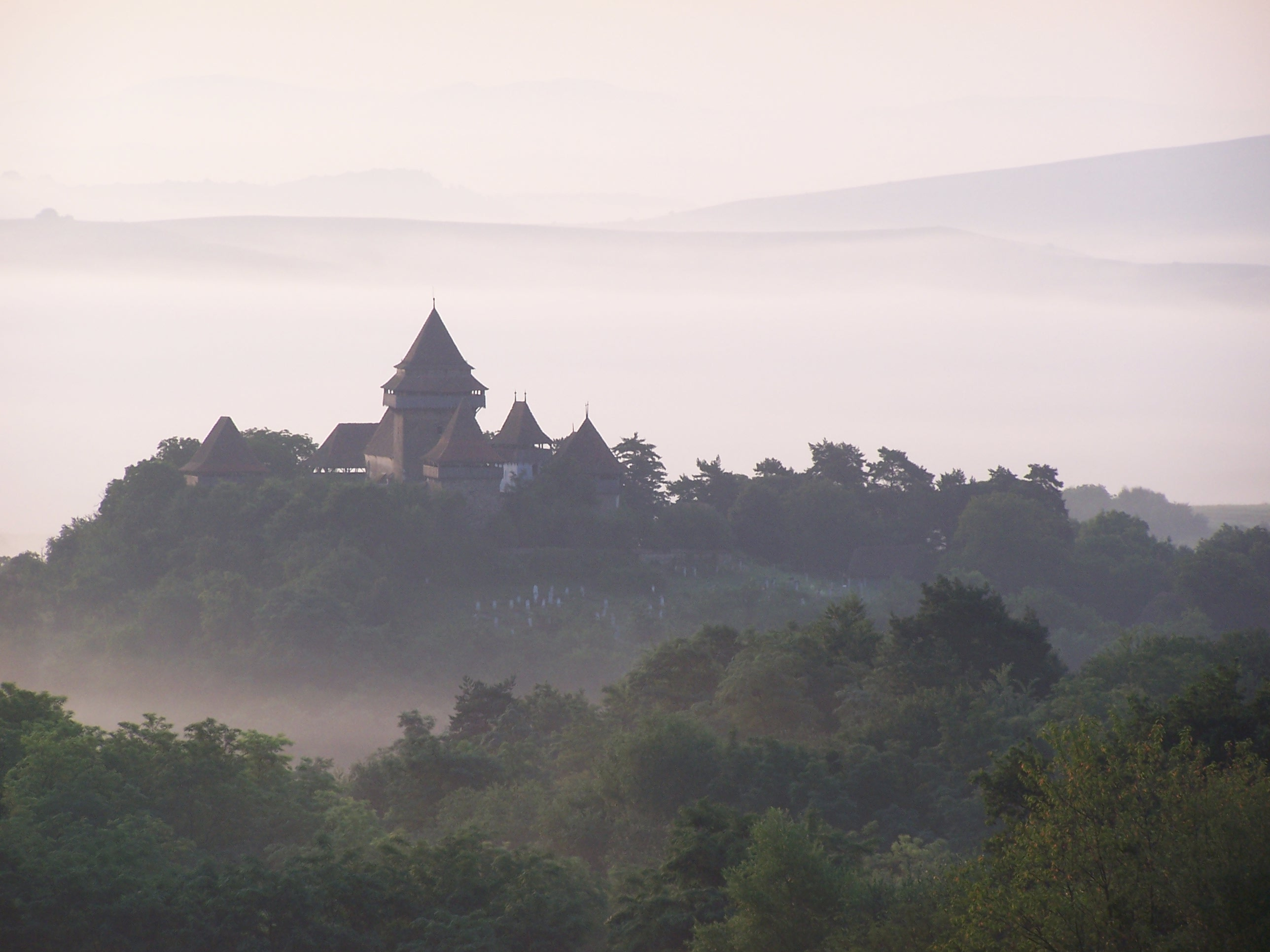
Distant view

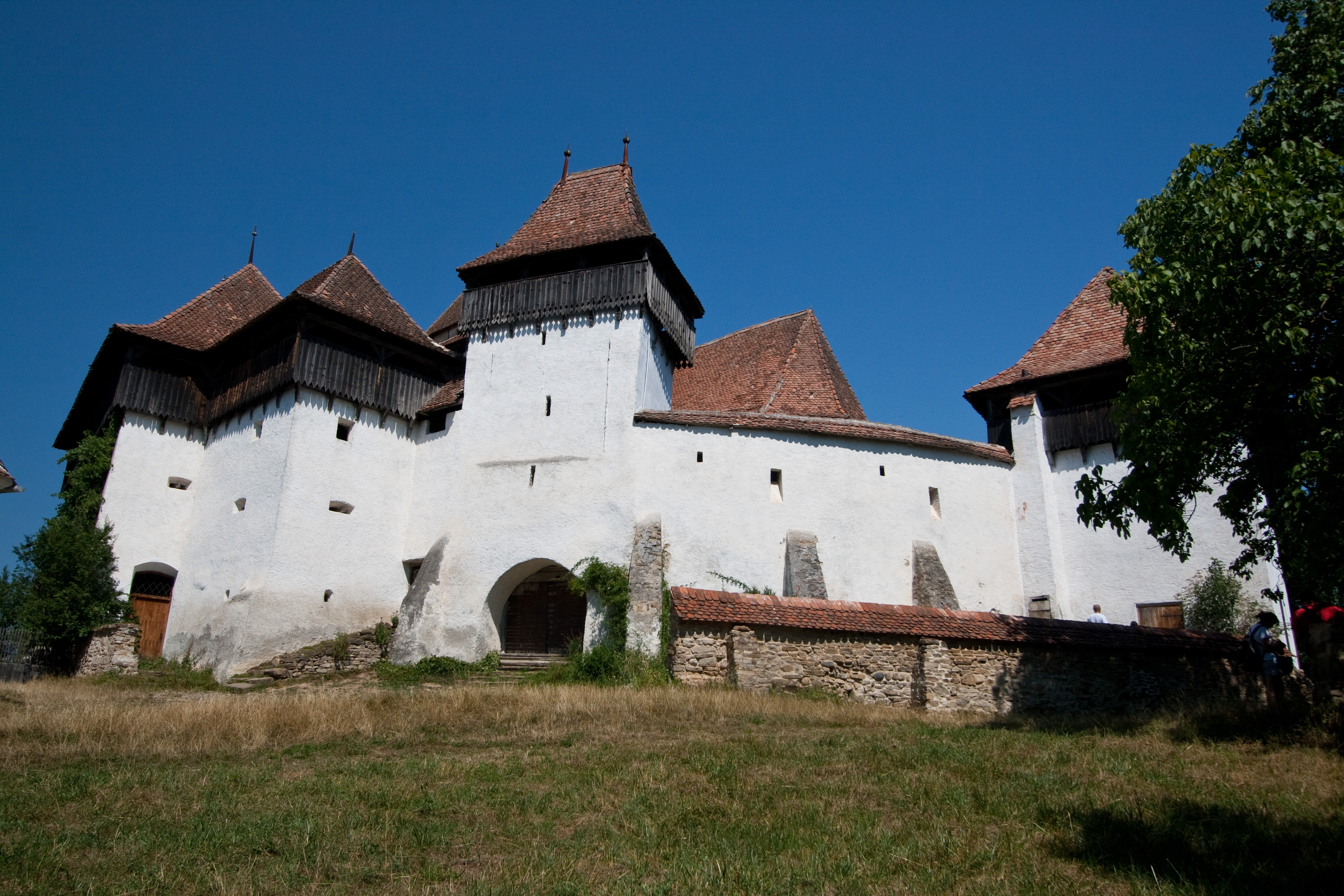
Southeast wall

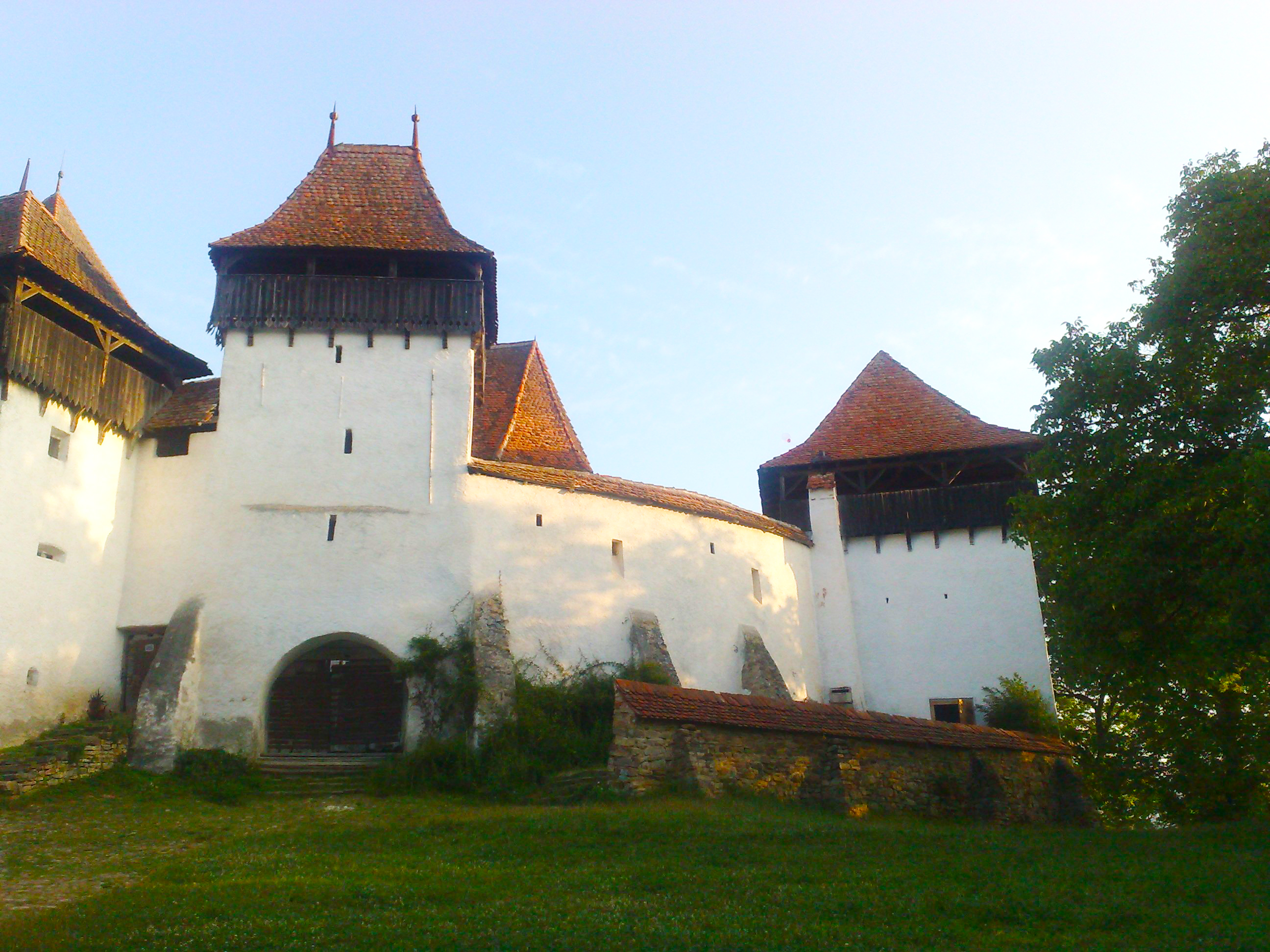
Main entrance gate

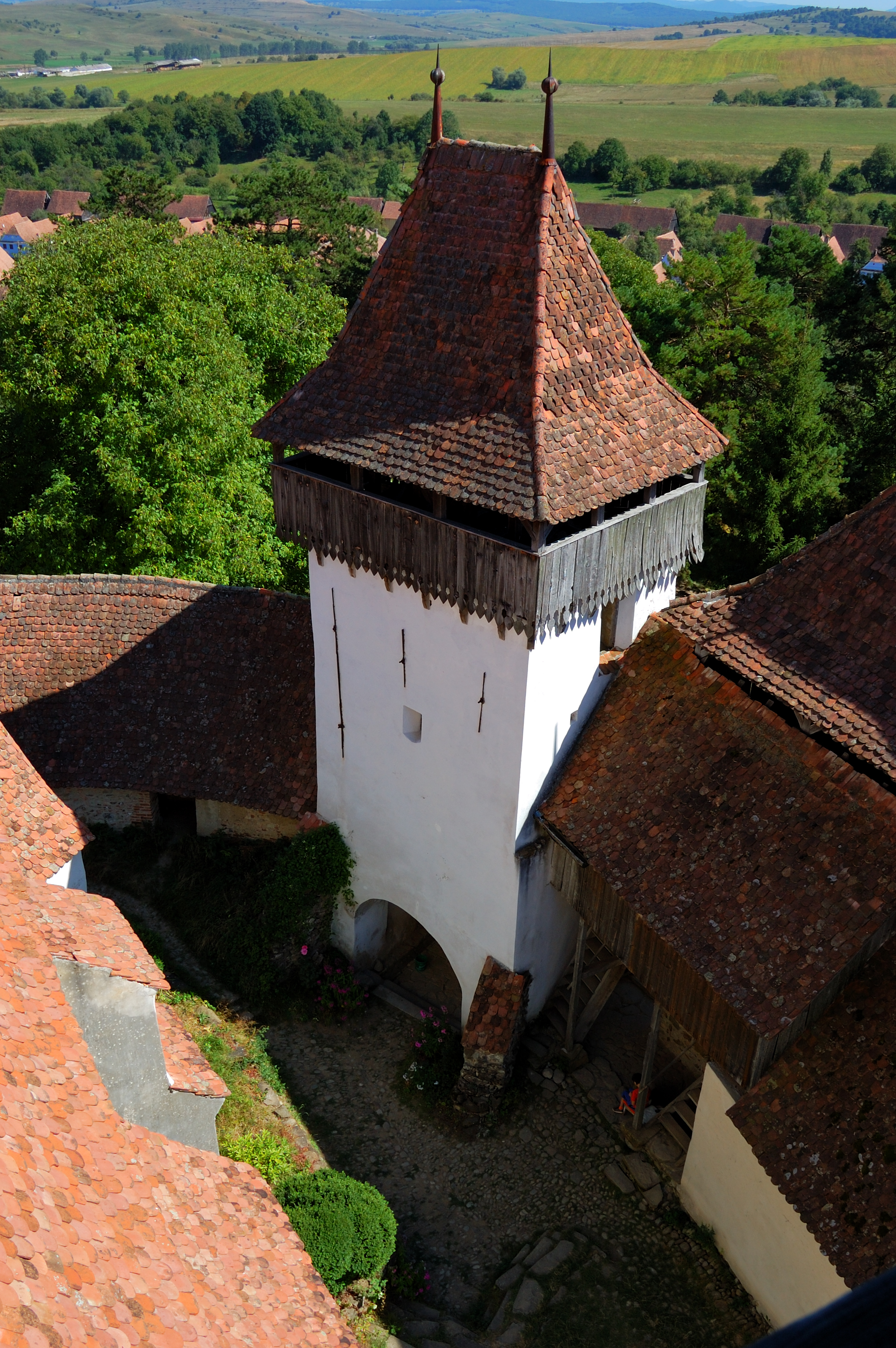
Wall interior

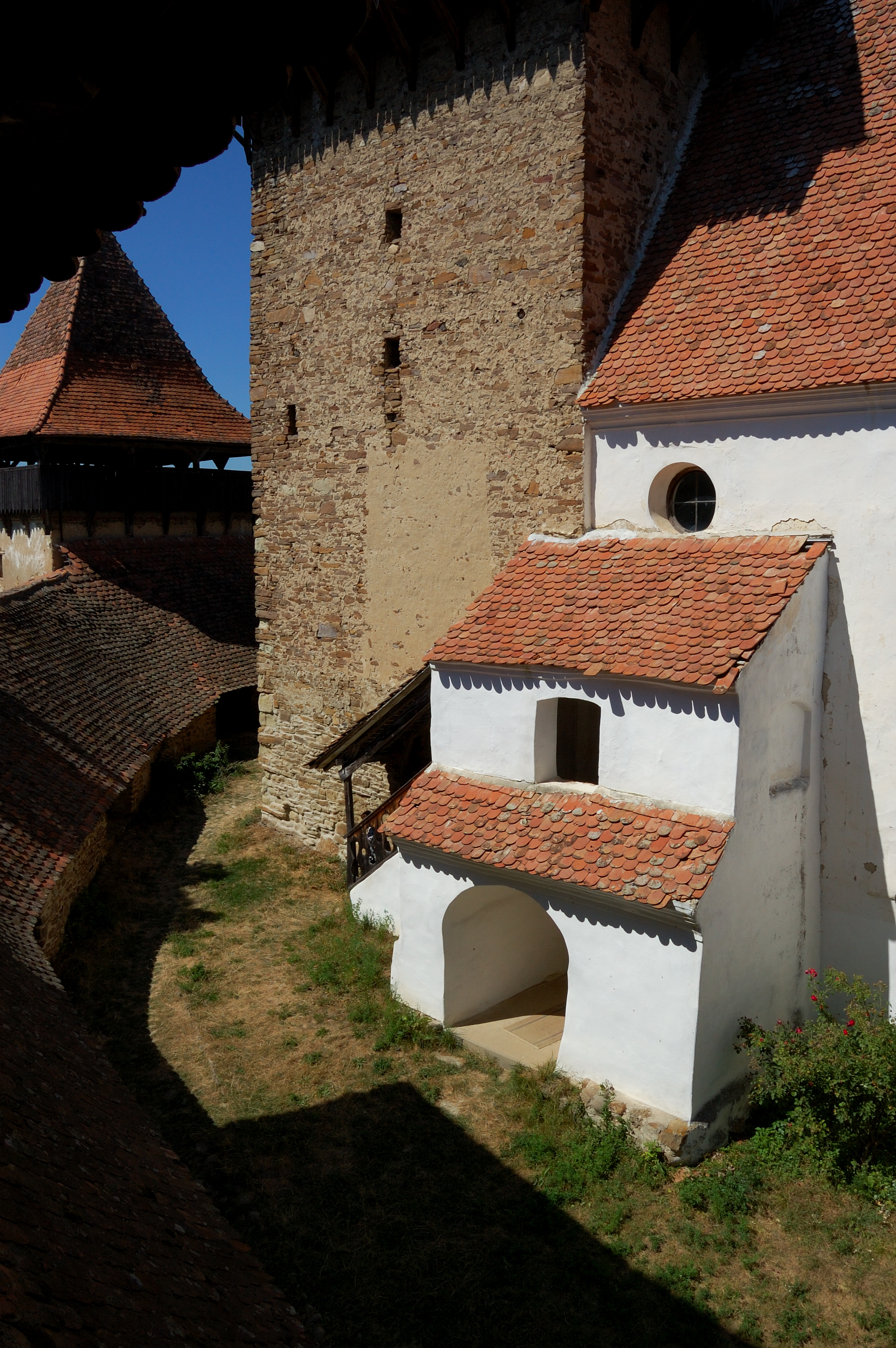
Wall, keep and church (left to right)

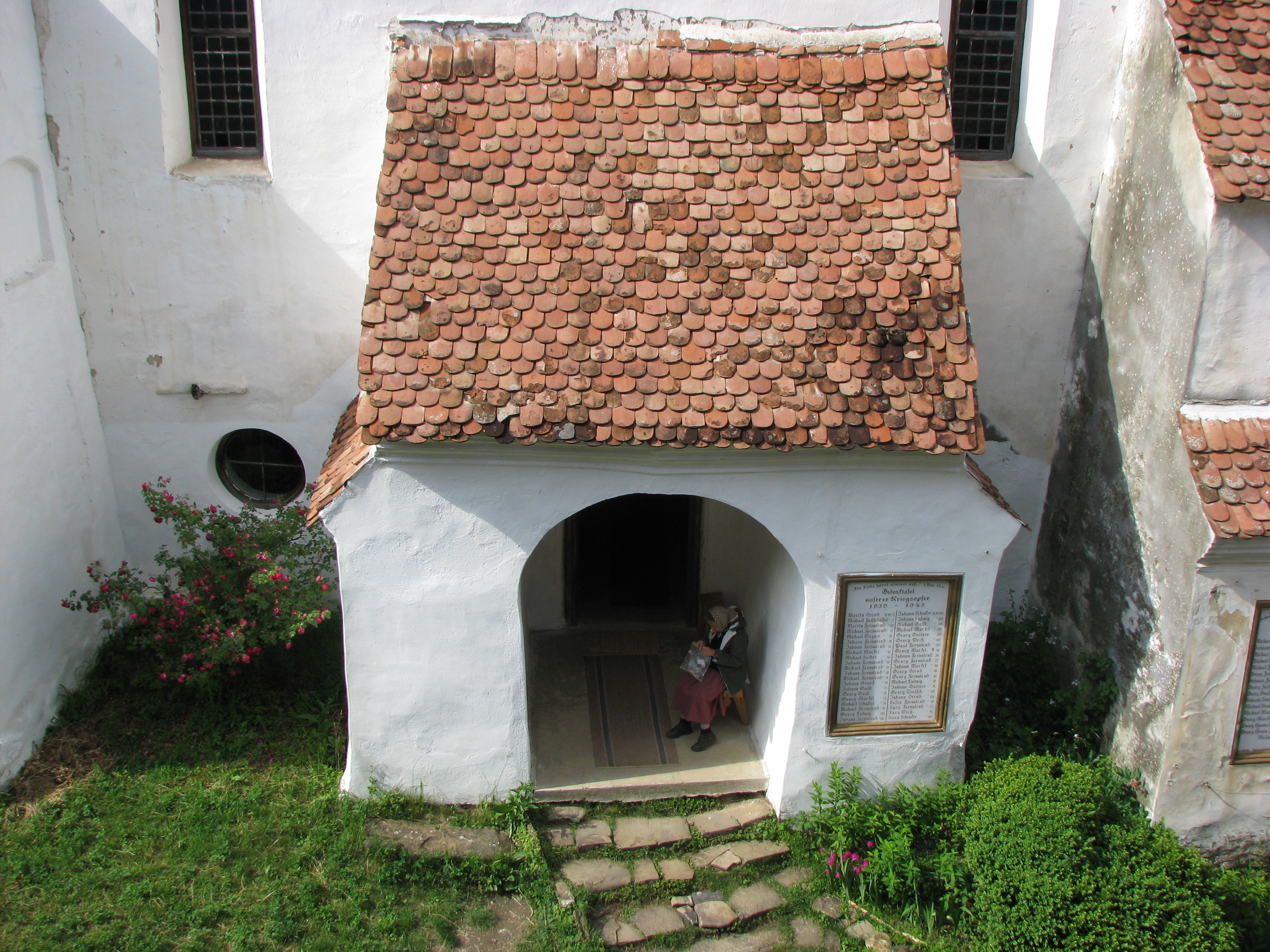
Church entrance
