= Jibert =

- Commune
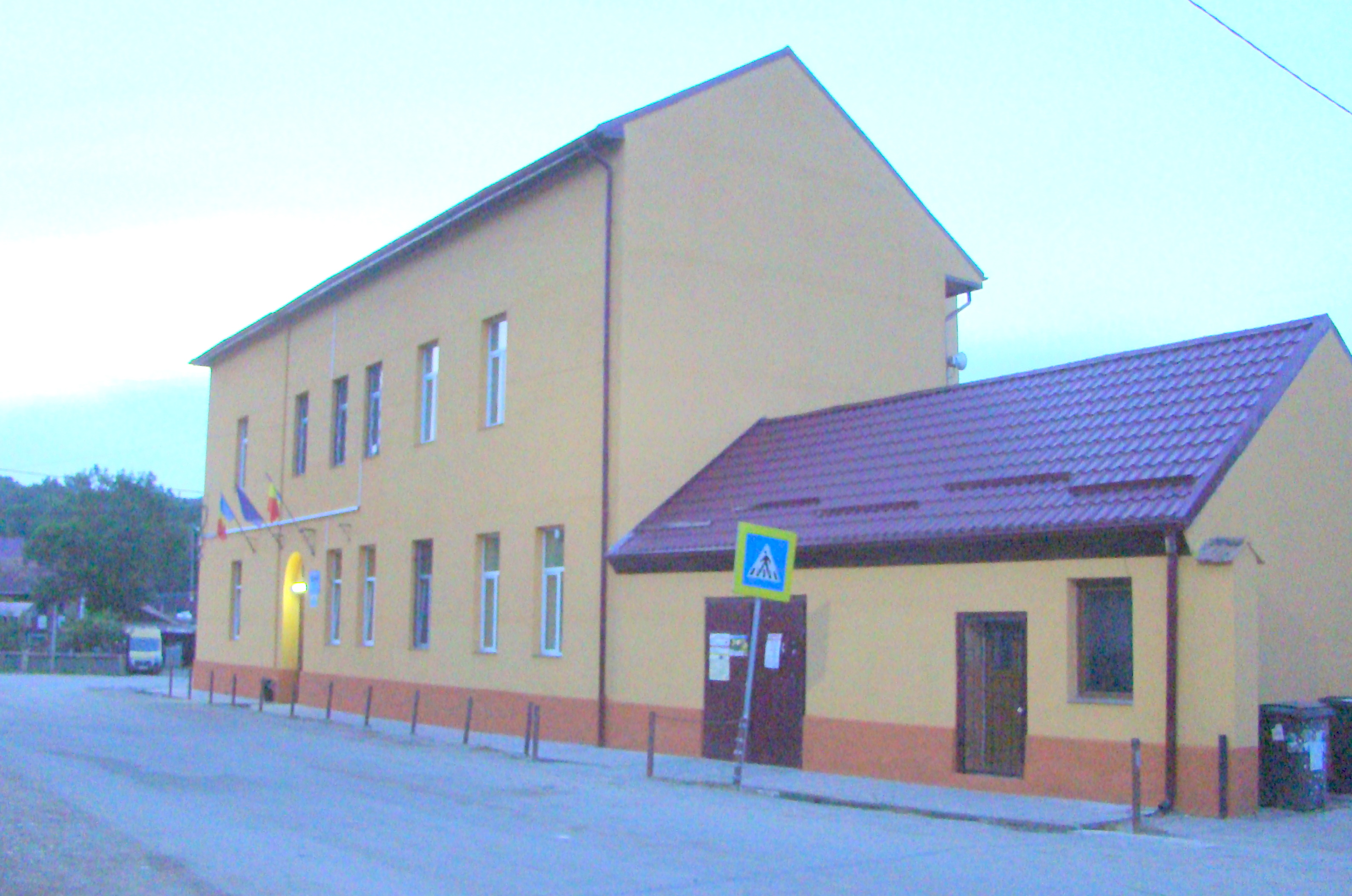
- Jibert townhall

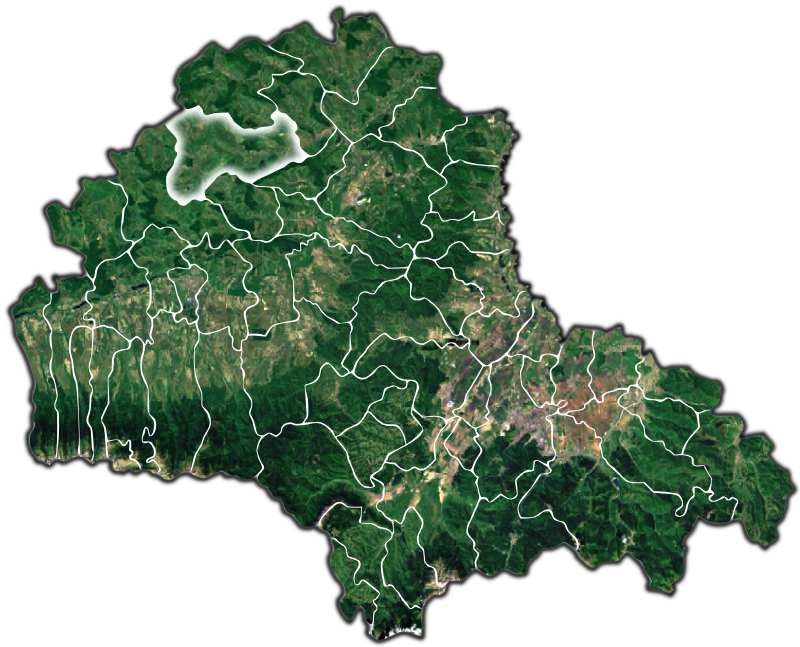
- Location within the county

- Location in Romania
- Coordinates: 46°0′N 25°4′E
- Country: Romania
- County: Brașov

Government
  - Mayor (2020–2024): Ioan-Iancu Boeriu (PNL)
- Area: 166.12 km^{2} (64.14 sq mi)
- Elevation: 501 m (1,644 ft)
- Population (2021-12-01): 2,260
  - Density: 13.6/km^{2} (35.2/sq mi)
- Time zone: UTC+02:00 (EET)
  - Summer (DST): UTC+03:00 (EEST)
- Postal code: 507110
- Area code: +40 x59
- Vehicle reg.: BV
- Website: www.primariajibert.ro

Jibert (German: Seiburg; Hungarian: Zsiberk) is a commune in Brașov County, Transylvania, Romania. It is composed of five villages: Dacia (until 1931 Ștena), Grânari, Jibert, Lovnic, and Văleni.

The commune is located in the northwestern part of the county, on the border with Sibiu County. It lies at a distance of 15 km (9.3 mi) from the town of Rupea, 28 km (17 mi) from the city of Făgăraș, and 78 km (48 mi) from the county seat, Brașov.

Historical population
Year	Pop.	±%
2002	2,536	—
2011	2,250	−11.3%
2021	2,260	+0.4%
Source: Census data

At the 2011 census, Jibert had 2,250 inhabitants, of which 68.6% were Romanians, 15.7% Hungarians, 12.9% Roma, and 2.8% Germans. At the 2021 census, the commune had a population of 2,260; of those, 55.88% were Romanians, 20.58% Roma, 12.39% Hungarians, and 1.59% Germans.

The House of Soterius von Sachsenheim is a Transylvanian Saxon noble family originating from the village Stein (present-day Dacia), in the former Saxon Repser Stuhl administrative division.

In Romanian	In German	In Saxon dialect	In Hungarian
Dacia	Stein	Stin	Garat
Grânari	Mukendorf	Makenderf	Nagymoha
Jibert	Seiburg	Seibrig	Zsiberk
Lovnic	Leblang	Lieflengk	Lemnek
Văleni	Woldorf	Wouldref	Dombos

== Natives ==
- Gheorghe Langa (1930 – 1968), equestrian
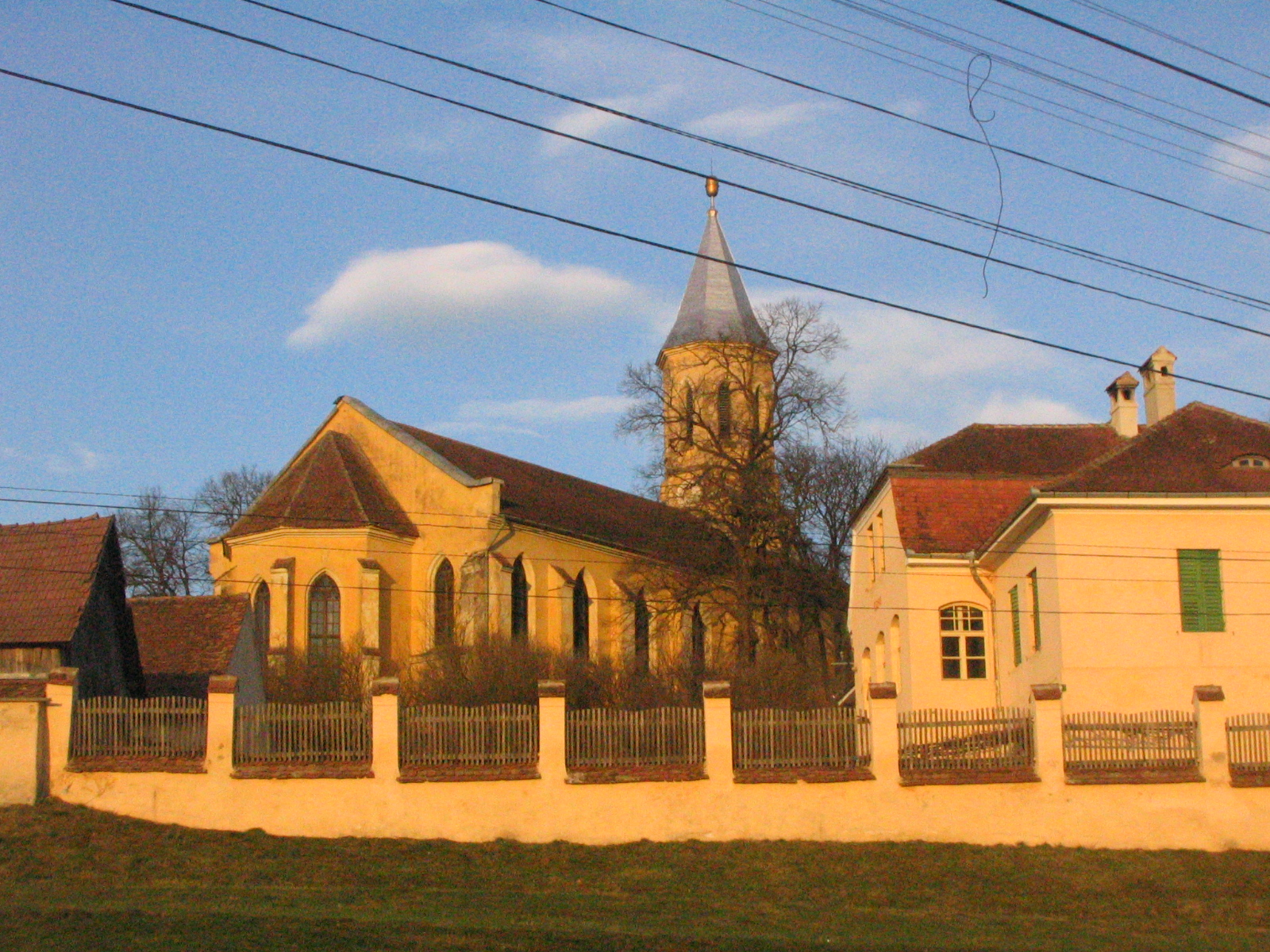
Jibert Lutheran church

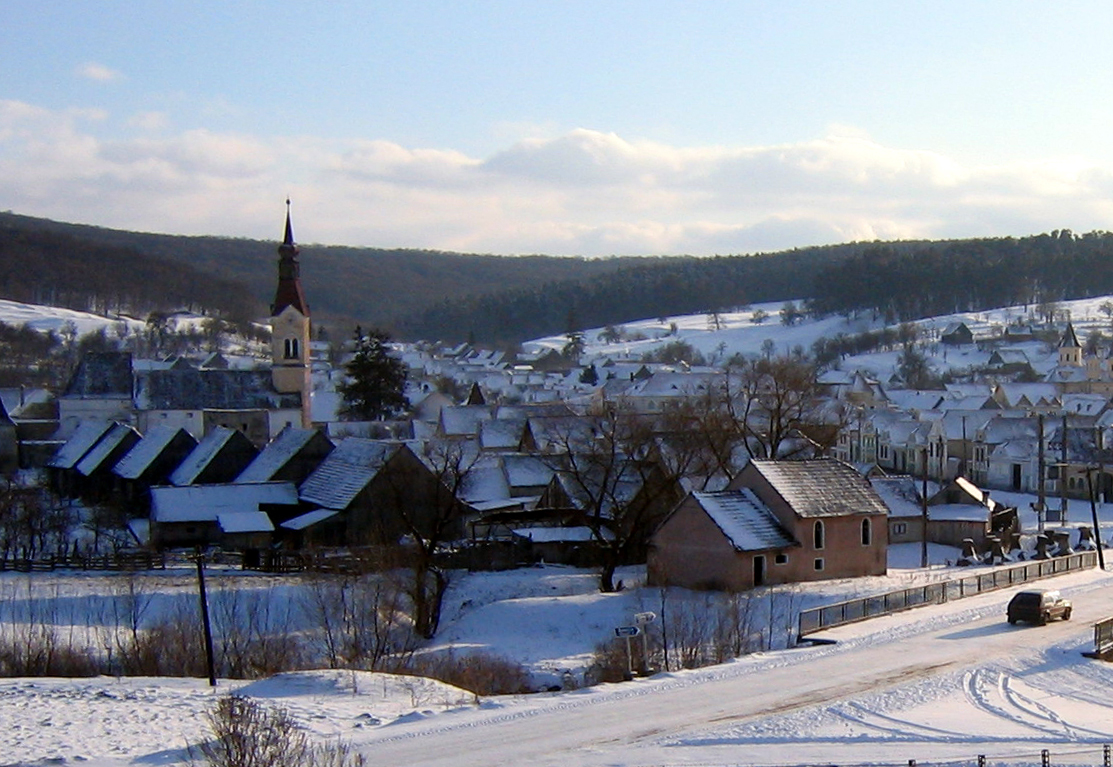
Dacia

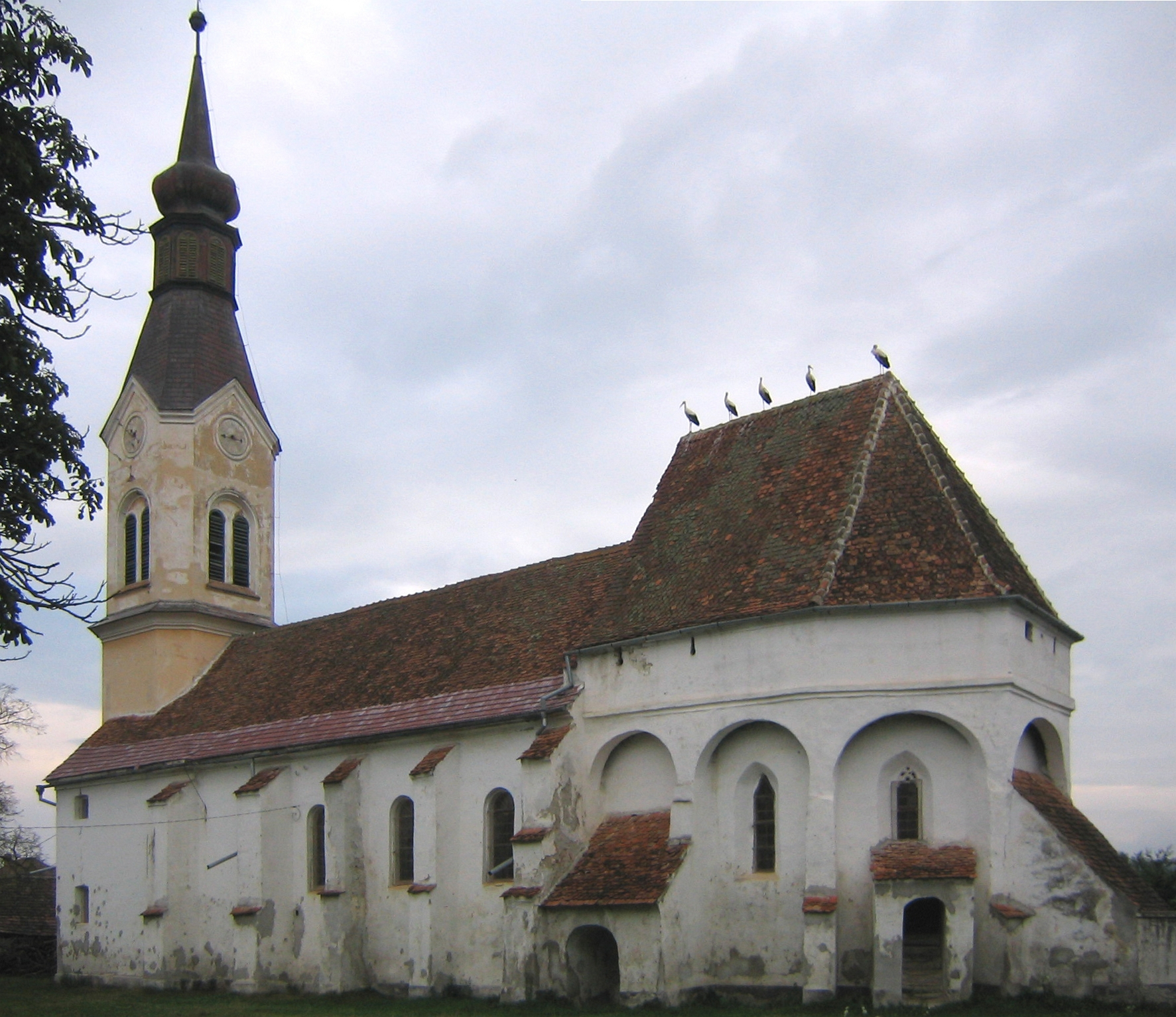
13th century Lutheran church in Dacia

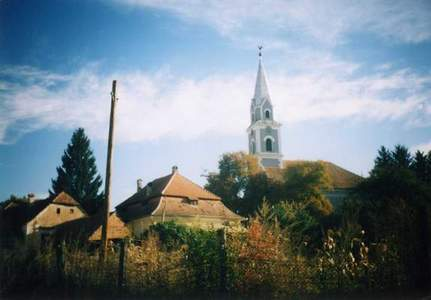
Lovnic
