= Rupea =

- Town
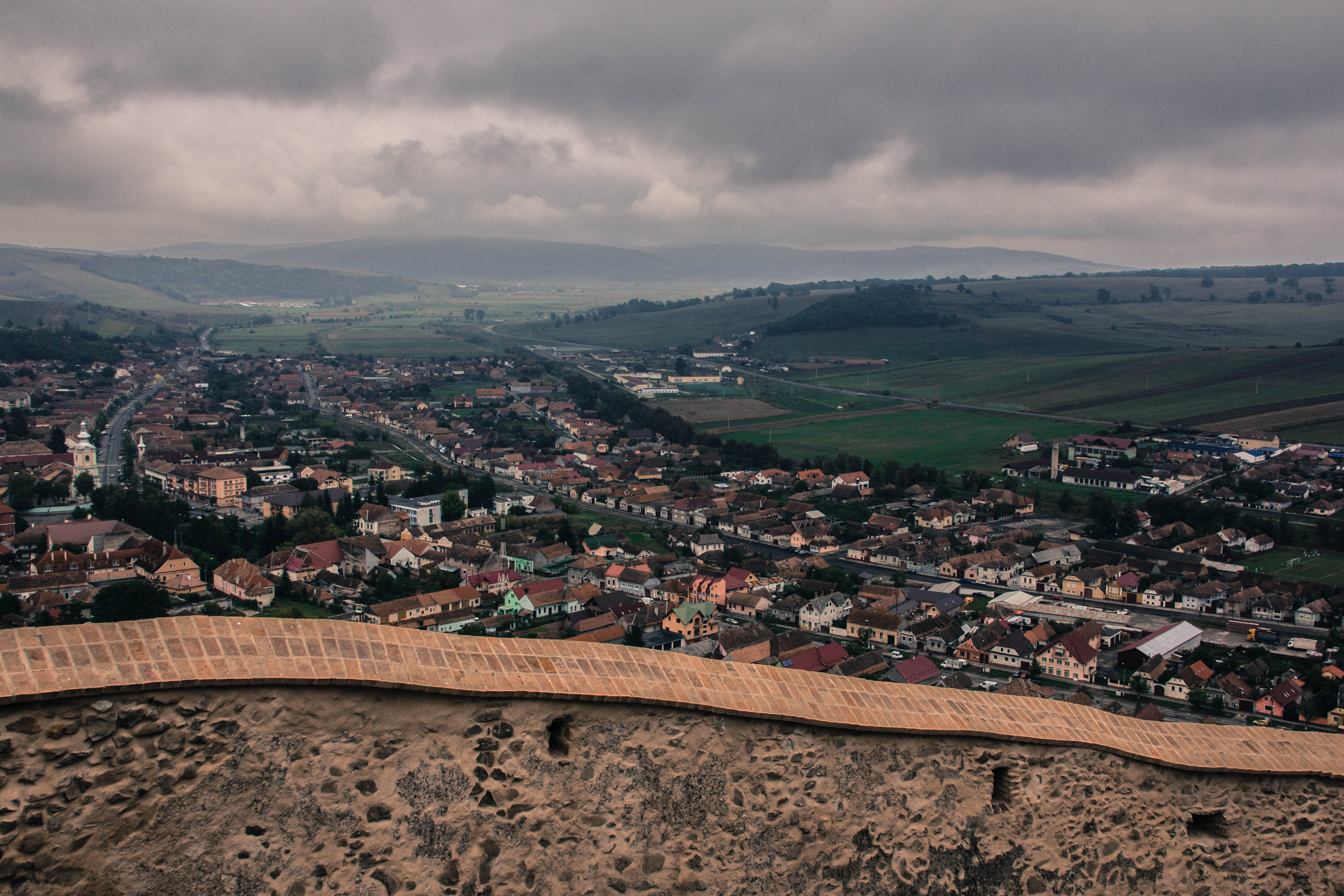
- The town of Rupea as seen from above from Rupea Citadel

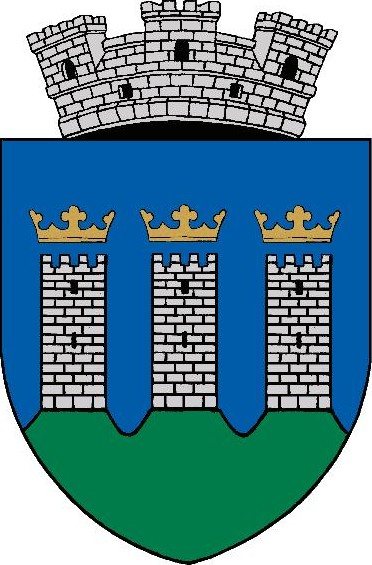
- Coat of arms

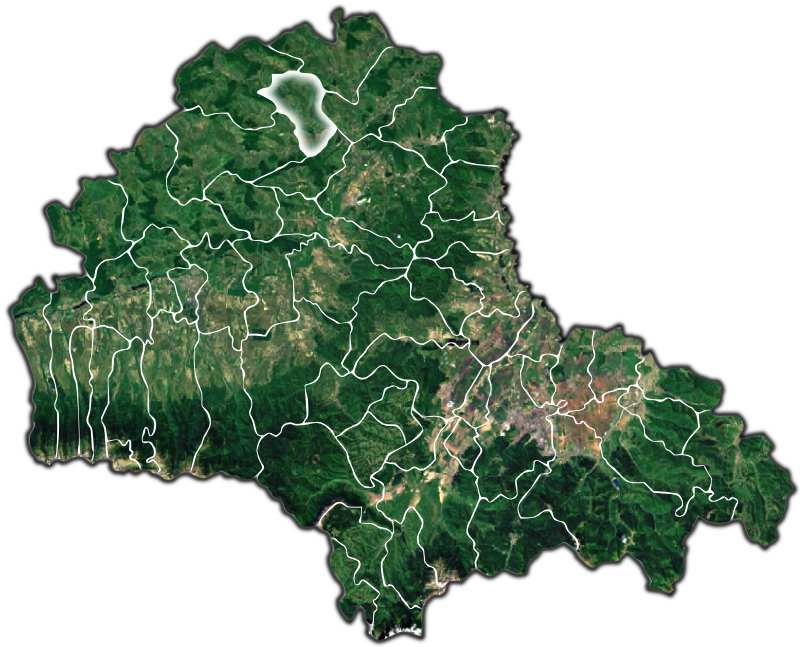
- Location in Brașov County

- Location in Romania
- Coordinates: 46°2′20″N 25°13′21″E
- Country: Romania
- County: Brașov

Government
  - Mayor (2024–2028): Alexandru Opriș (PNL)
- Area: 74.87 km^{2} (28.91 sq mi)
- Elevation: 461 m (1,512 ft)
- Population (2021-12-01): 4,907
  - Density: 65.54/km^{2} (169.7/sq mi)
- Time zone: UTC+02:00 (EET)
  - Summer (DST): UTC+03:00 (EEST)
- Postal code: 505500
- Area code: (+40) 02 68
- Vehicle reg.: BV
- Website: primariarupea.ro

Rupea (German: Reps; Transylvanian Saxon: Räppes; Hungarian: Kőhalom, lit. 'mound of rocks'; Latin: Ripa) is a town in Brașov County in Transylvania, Romania. It administers one village, Fișer (Schweischer; Sövénység). Both Fișer and Rupea have fortified churches. Older Romanian names for the settlement include Cohalm and Holuma. In 2021, the town's population was 4,907 inhabitants.

The town is nationally known for its fortress, which in 2023 attracted around 100,000 tourists. Additionally, 11 km from the town runs Via Transilvanica, the most important and longest hiking and endurance trail in Romania, and 13 km away lies the rural site of Viscri, which is included in the UNESCO World Heritage.

== Administration ==
The current local council has the following political composition, based on the results of the votes cast at the 2024 Romanian local elections.

Party	Seats	Current Council
National Liberal Party (PNL)	7	
Social Democratic Party (PSD)	5	
Democratic Alliance of Hungarians in Romania (UDMR/RMDSZ)	2	
Democratic Forum of Germans in Romania (FDGR/DFDR)	1	

== Geography ==
The town is located in the northern part of Brașov County, in a hill region on the banks of the river Cozd and its left tributary, the Fișer. The town is located on the E60 route, 60 km (37 mi) from the county seat, Brașov, and 50 km (31 mi) from Sighișoara. The Rupea railway station serves the CFR 300 mainline, which connects Bucharest with the Hungarian border near Oradea.

== History ==
Founded most likely between the 12th and 13th centuries (see terra Daraus in the Diploma Andreanum, 1224), with the regional legal reorganisation, Rupea developed at the foot of the fortress, which in the past was an important defensive strategic point for the Saxon administration in southern Transylvania and hosted a seat of justice.

Administratively, from the first half of the 14th century until 1876, Rupea was the seat of one of the Saxon administrative units. Later, it became part of Nagy-Küküllő County of Austria-Hungary from 1876 to 1918. In the immediate aftermath of World War I, following the declaration of the Union of Transylvania with Romania, the area passed under Romanian administration during the Hungarian–Romanian War of 1918–1919. By the terms of the Treaty of Trianon of 1920, it became part of the Kingdom of Romania.

In 1925, Rupea became the headquarters of plasa Rupea, within Târnava-Mare County, until 1950. Following administrative-territorial reforms during the communist period, the town was part of Stalin Region (1950–1960), later renamed Brașov Region (1960–1968), and starting from 1968, it became part of Brașov County.

== Demographics ==
Historical population
Year	Pop.	±%
1850	2,565	—
1900	2,628	+2.5%
1910	2,941	+11.9%
1930	2,809	−4.5%
1941	2,781	−1.0%
1956	4,691	+68.7%
1966	6,273	+33.7%
1977	6,640	+5.9%
1992	6,326	−4.7%
2002	6,246	−1.3%
2011	5,011	−19.8%
2021	4,907	−2.1%
Source: Census data

At the 2021 census, Rupea had a population of 4,907; of those, 63.93% were Romanians, 14.39% Hungarians, 9.86% Roma, and 1.06% Germans (more specifically Transylvanian Saxons). At the 2011 census, 71.6% of the 5,269 inhabitants were Romanians, 19.5% Hungarians, 7.1% Roma, and 1.7% Germans.

== Natives ==
- Lotte Binder (1880–1930), teacher and women's rights activist
- Claudiu M. Florian (born 1969), writer
- Gyula László (1910–1998), historian, archaeologist, and artist

== Climate ==
Rupea has a humid continental climate (Cfb in the Köppen climate classification).

Climate data for Rupea
Month	Jan	Feb	Mar	Apr	May	Jun	Jul	Aug	Sep	Oct	Nov	Dec	Year
Mean daily maximum °C (°F)	1.2 (34.2)	3.6 (38.5)	8.4 (47.1)	14.4 (57.9)	19.1 (66.4)	22.4 (72.3)	24.3 (75.7)	24.6 (76.3)	19.4 (66.9)	13.9 (57.0)	8.4 (47.1)	2.4 (36.3)	13.5 (56.3)
Daily mean °C (°F)	−2.9 (26.8)	−1 (30)	3.4 (38.1)	9.1 (48.4)	14.1 (57.4)	17.6 (63.7)	19.5 (67.1)	19.5 (67.1)	14.6 (58.3)	9 (48)	4 (39)	−1.2 (29.8)	8.8 (47.8)
Mean daily minimum °C (°F)	−6.6 (20.1)	−5.1 (22.8)	−1.4 (29.5)	3.5 (38.3)	8.6 (47.5)	12.5 (54.5)	14.4 (57.9)	14.3 (57.7)	10 (50)	4.7 (40.5)	0.6 (33.1)	−4.3 (24.3)	4.3 (39.7)
Average precipitation mm (inches)	42 (1.7)	40 (1.6)	53 (2.1)	74 (2.9)	86 (3.4)	97 (3.8)	82 (3.2)	66 (2.6)	59 (2.3)	53 (2.1)	45 (1.8)	45 (1.8)	742 (29.3)
Source: https://en.climate-data.org/europe/romania/brasov/rupea-12795/

== See also ==
- Battle of Kőhalom
- Rupea Citadel
