= Dacia, Brașov =

Dacia
- village
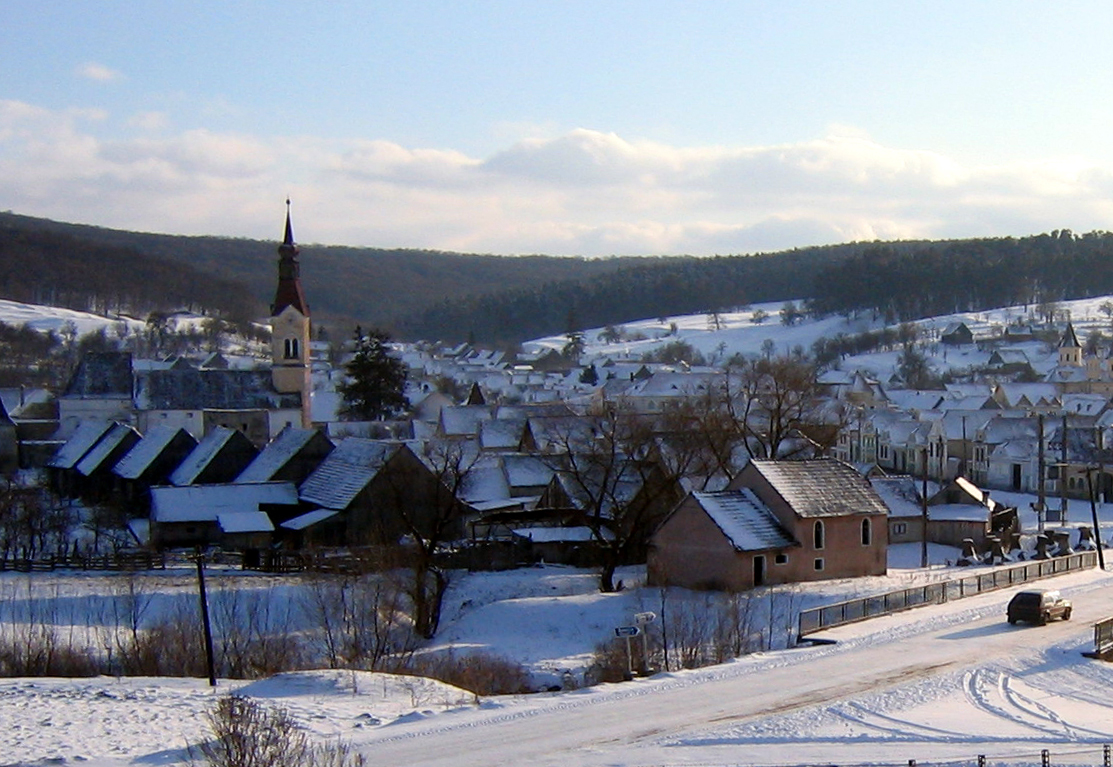
- Location of the village in Romania

- Location within Romania
- Coordinates: 46°0′N 25°4′E
- Country: Romania
- County: Brașov County
- Population (2002): 671
- Time zone: UTC+2 (EET)
  - Summer (DST): UTC+3 (EEST)

Dacia (in the Transylvanian Saxon dialect, Ste, Stin, Štîn, in German Stein, in Hungarian Garat), is a village in Brașov County, Transylvania, Romania, part of Jibert commune. Until 1931, the village was known in Romanian as Ștena (Romanianization of the German/Saxon name). In that year, the authorities changed its name to Dacia.

== History ==
The village was first attested in 1309. Until 1980, it was inhabited by a majority of Transylvanian Saxons (by the end of 1970, most of them started emigrating to West Germany). The Transylvanian Saxon noble family of Soterius von Sachsenheim has its origins in this village, Valentinus Schöchtert (born c. 1554) being the earliest known ancestor.

== Climate ==
Dacia has a humid continental climate (Cfb in the Köppen climate classification).

Climate data for Dacia
Month	Jan	Feb	Mar	Apr	May	Jun	Jul	Aug	Sep	Oct	Nov	Dec	Year
Mean daily maximum °C (°F)	1.2 (34.2)	3.6 (38.5)	8.4 (47.1)	14.4 (57.9)	19.1 (66.4)	22.4 (72.3)	24.3 (75.7)	24.6 (76.3)	19.4 (66.9)	13.9 (57.0)	8.4 (47.1)	2.4 (36.3)	13.5 (56.3)
Daily mean °C (°F)	−2.9 (26.8)	−1 (30)	3.4 (38.1)	9.1 (48.4)	14.1 (57.4)	17.6 (63.7)	19.5 (67.1)	19.5 (67.1)	14.6 (58.3)	9 (48)	4 (39)	−1.2 (29.8)	8.8 (47.8)
Mean daily minimum °C (°F)	−6.6 (20.1)	−5.1 (22.8)	−1.4 (29.5)	3.5 (38.3)	8.6 (47.5)	12.5 (54.5)	14.4 (57.9)	14.3 (57.7)	10 (50)	4.7 (40.5)	0.6 (33.1)	−4.3 (24.3)	4.3 (39.7)
Average precipitation mm (inches)	42 (1.7)	40 (1.6)	53 (2.1)	74 (2.9)	86 (3.4)	97 (3.8)	82 (3.2)	66 (2.6)	59 (2.3)	53 (2.1)	45 (1.8)	45 (1.8)	742 (29.3)
Source: https://en.climate-data.org/europe/romania/brasov/dacia-836608/

== Churches ==
The local Evangelical Lutheran fortified church dates to the 12th century (being, as such, built during the High Middle Ages), pertaining to the local Transylvanian Saxon community.

== Education ==
The German school was first mentioned in the year 1488.

== Image gallery ==
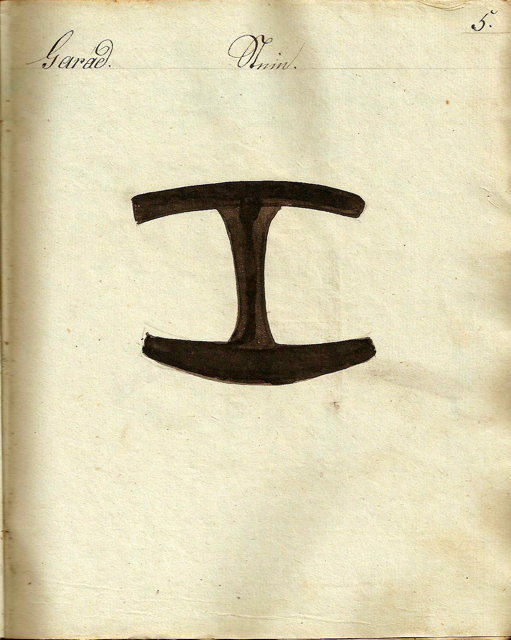
1826 - Tamga of the cattle from Ștena

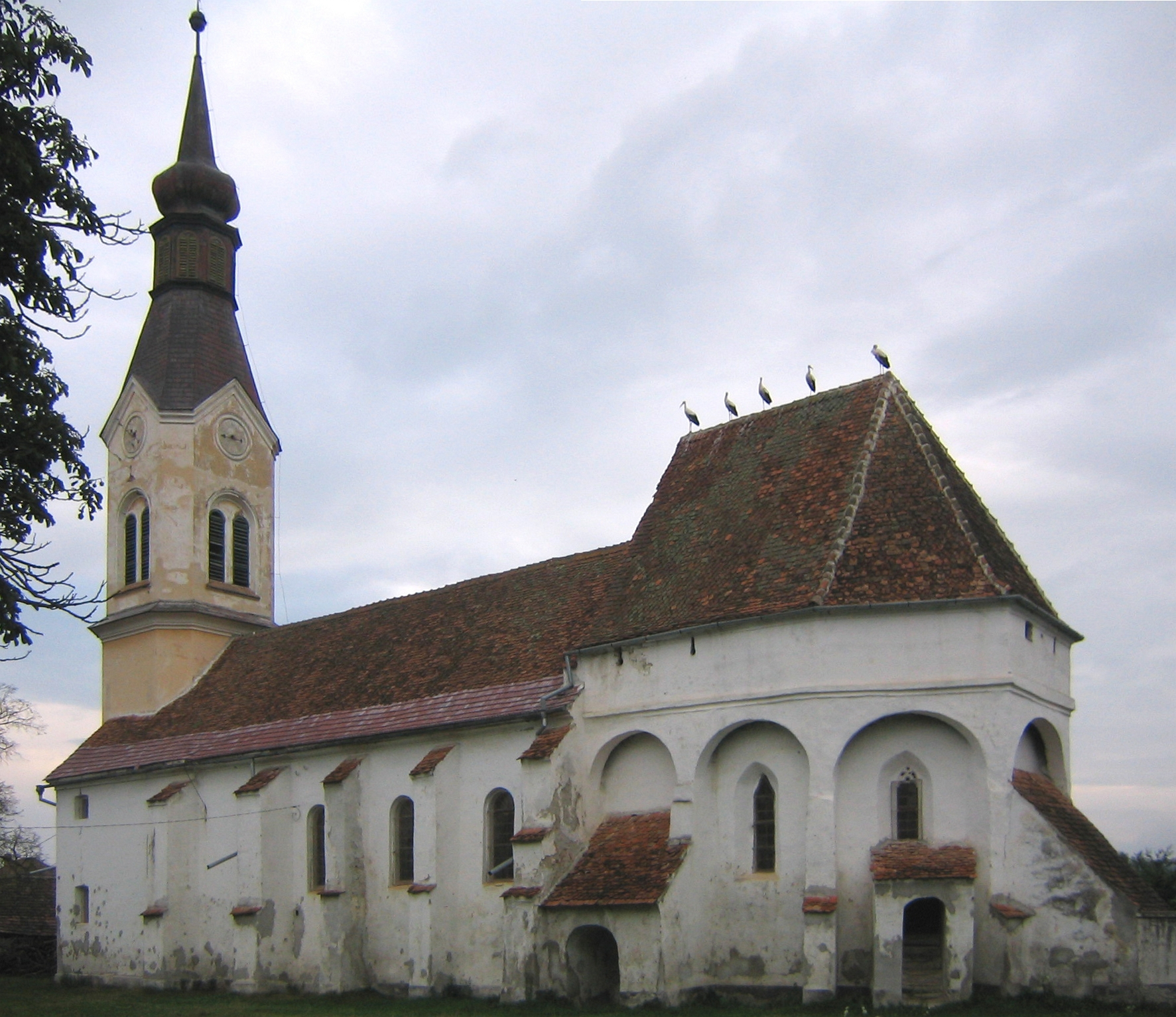
The Lutheran church from Dacia
