= Biertan Donarium =

4th-century Christian votive object found in Romania

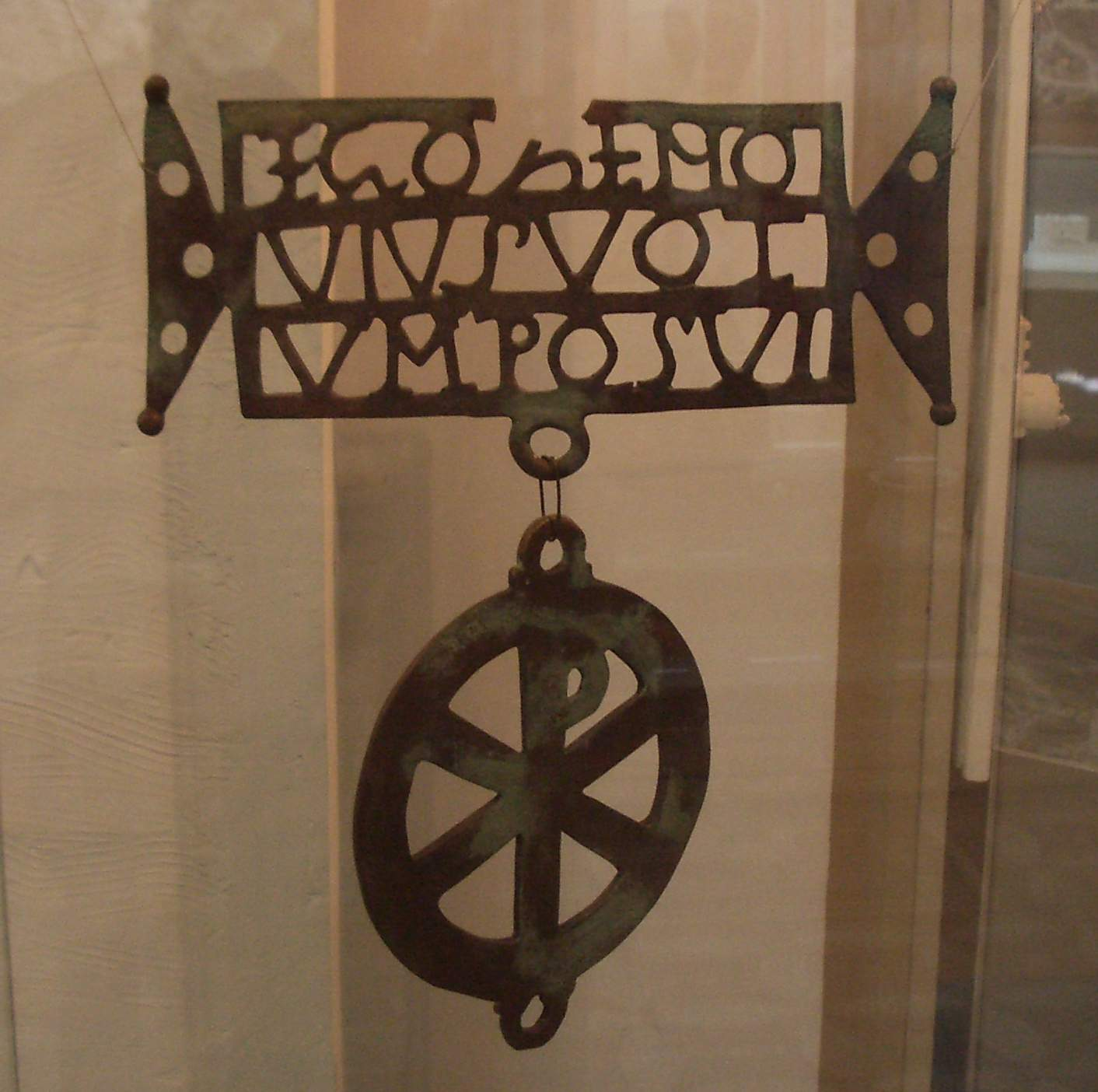
Biertan Donarium

The Biertan Donarium is a fourth-century Christian votive object found near the town of Biertan, in Transylvania, Romania. Made out of bronze in the shape of a Labarum, it has the Latin text EGO ZENOVIVS VOTVM POSVI, which can be approximately translated as "I, Zenovius, offered this gift".

It was found in 1775 in the Chinedru forest, about 5 kilometres (3.1 mi) south of Biertan and it was part of the collections of Baron Samuel von Brukenthal, nowadays being part of the exhibits of the Brukenthal National Museum.

There are several theories on the origins of this artifact. According to the supporters of the Daco-Romanian continuity theory, this donarium was made by the survivor Romanized, Latin-speaking Christian population of Dacia (the ancestors of Romanians according to this theory) following the Aurelian Retreat. This artifact is used as an important witness to the continuity of the use of Latin in this area. This opinion is supported by the Romanian Academy.

The donor's name (see Zenobius) is oriental, not Dacian or Roman.

Those historians who are skeptical about this object point to the dubious circumstances of this finding.

They emphasize that there were no Roman settlements or Christian churches near to Biertan. According to them this object was made in Aquileia in Northern Italy during the 4th century and it was carried into Transylvania as a loot by Gothic warriors or by trading. It is the most possible that the find from Biertan is a result of plundering in Illyricum or Pannonia or in the Balkans anytime between the fourth and the sixth century and this artifact was reused as a pagan object by its new owners.

The object could have also belonged to a captured Roman(?), escaped or kidnapped from Pannonia (?)

Originally it was intended to be hung from a candelabrum but the perforations made later indicate it was reused and attached to a coffer for storing vessels or other goods. According to this opinion, even its usage for Christian purposes should be questioned in the territory of Transylvania.
