= Biertan fortified church =

Heritage site in Sibiu County, Romania

Biertan Fortified Church
- Biserica fortificată din Biertan
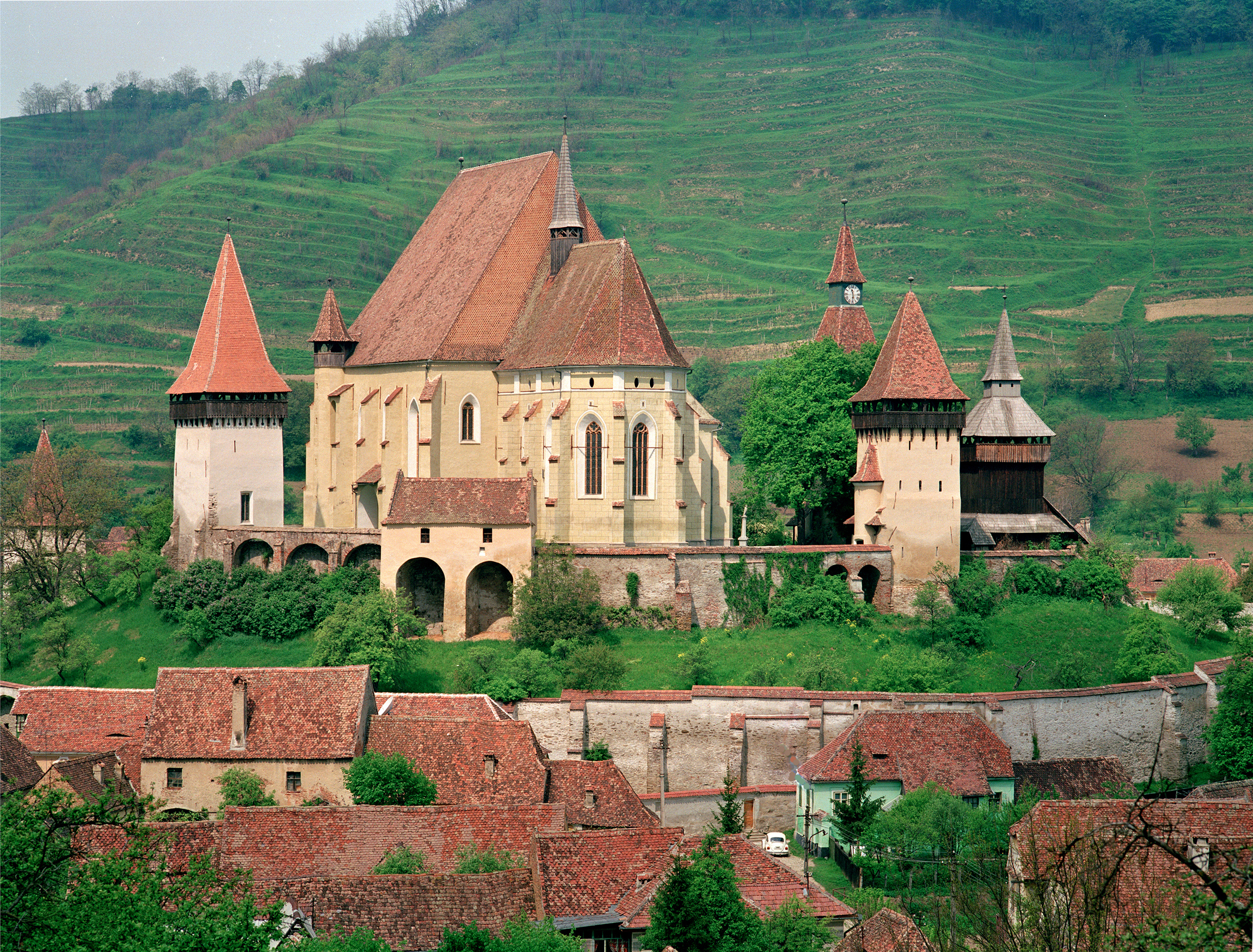

Religion
- Affiliation: Lutheran

Location
- Location: Biertan, Sibiu County Romania
- Interactive map of Biertan Fortified Church
- Coordinates: 46.135198°N 24.521323°E

Architecture
- Type: Fortified church
- Style: Gothic
- Groundbreaking: 1486
- Completed: 1524
- UNESCO World Heritage Site
- Official name: Villages with fortified churches in Transylvania
- Type: Cultural
- Criteria: iv
- Designated: 1993 (17th session); 1999 (23rd session – Extension)
- Reference no.: 596
- State Party: Romania
- Region: Europe and North America
- Monument istoric
- Official name: Historic monuments in Sibiu County
- Type: architectural
- Reference no.: LMI Code: SB-II-a-A-12328

The Biertan fortified church (Romanian: Biserica fortificată din Biertan; German: Kirchenburg von Birthälm) is a Lutheran fortified church in Biertan (German: Birthälm), Sibiu County, in the Transylvania region of Romania. It was built by the ethnic German Transylvanian Saxon community at a time when the area belonged to the Kingdom of Hungary. Briefly Roman Catholic, it became Evangelical Lutheran following the Reformation. Together with the surrounding village, the church forms part of the villages with fortified churches in Transylvania UNESCO World Heritage Site.

== Description ==
=== Background and church ===
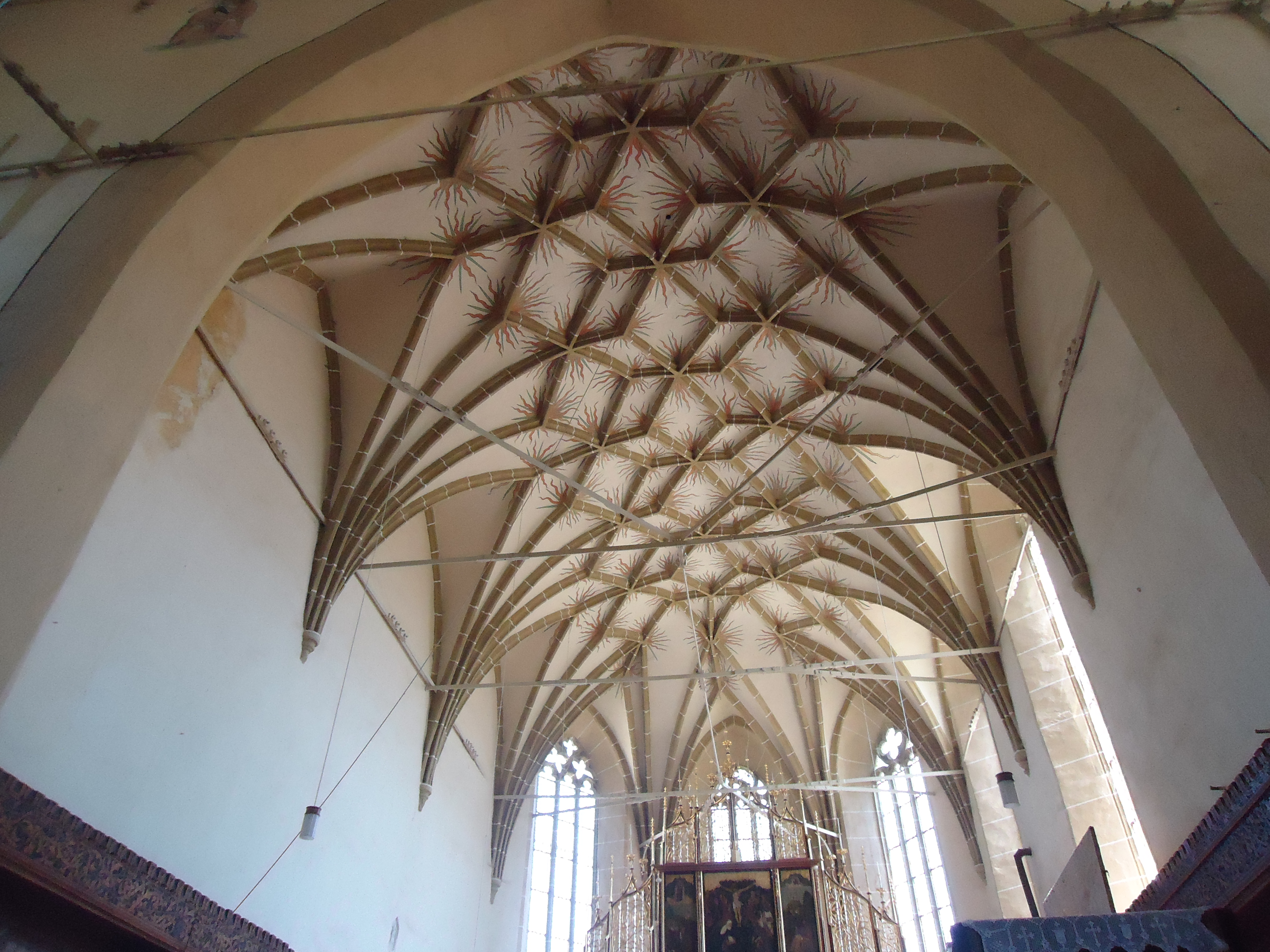
Nave ceiling

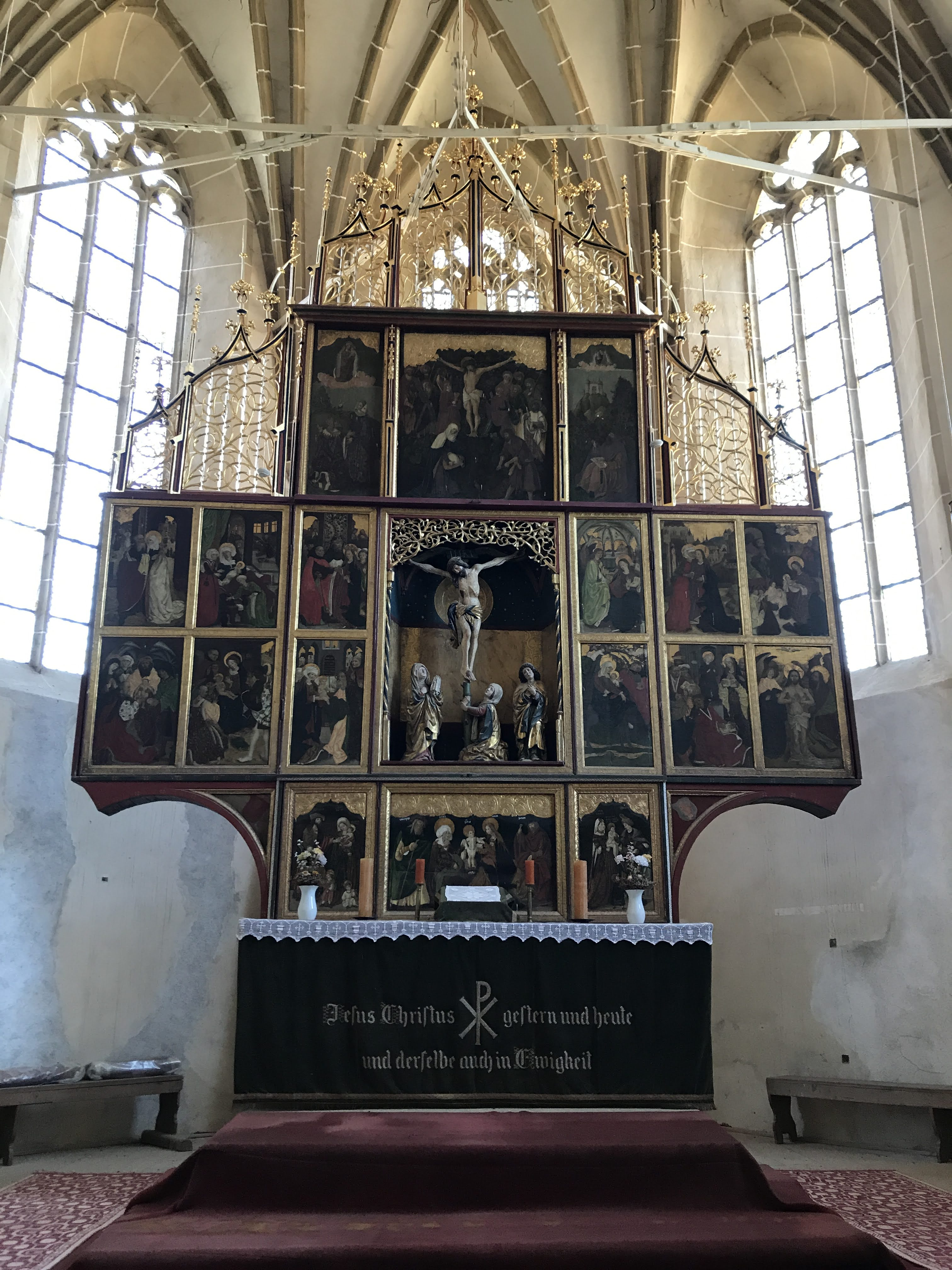
Altar with polyptych

Biertan was founded by Transylvanian Saxons in the medieval Kingdom of Hungary. It was allowed to organize a market, placing it in competition with Mediaș and Moșna; it was also the see of the Saxon Lutheran Church from 1572 to 1867. This accounts for the elaborate church and its defenses.

A hall church with three naves that retains a design close to the original, it was the last such church built in Transylvania, and was constructed between 1486 and 1524 on the site of an earlier Romanesque church. Dedicated to the Virgin Mary and built in Late Gothic style with Renaissance touches, the structure was constrained by the hilly landscape. The choir is 18 m in length, with a rib-vaulted ceiling, while the three naves of equal height also have rib vaulting. A defensive level above the choir has parapets and a battlement. A second, wooden, level was demolished in 1803. The polyptych altarpiece has 28 panels executed between 1482 and 1513 by a painter likely trained at Vienna and Nuremberg. In the center, there is a sculpted group: a crucifix with Jesus Christ hanging, Mary standing and Mary Magdalene embracing the cross. The upper side panels show visions of Ezekiel and Augustus. The stone pulpit, which shows scenes carved in relief, dates to 1523. The richly decorated intarsia door of the sacristy has a complex lock, displayed at the 1889 Paris World's Fair. Its central system blocks the door in thirteen points, ensuring the safety of the valuables kept in the sacristy.

=== Fortifications and recognition ===
The King granted the town the right to bear arms when the Ottoman army was frightening the surroundings. Instead of building fortresses around the towns, the Transylvanian Saxons chose to fortify their churches. The church has three rows of exterior fortifications linked by nine gate towers. The first, with four towers, dates to the 14th century; the second was built together with the church, and has a series of reinforcing arches; the third, also with towers, is from the 16th and 17th centuries. The clock tower to the north of the church also serves as a gate within the inner fortifications. Four stories high, it has a wooden battlement and parapets. The clock is above the pyramid-shaped roof. The wooden bell tower is located north of the church, while the mausoleum tower contains the headstones of the priest who built the church as well as the bishops buried at Biertan. The Catholic tower was used by the few Saxons who did not adhere to the Reformation but kept their Roman Catholic faith. Its chapel (ca. 1520–1530) features a rare example of 16th-century Transylvanian mural painting, forming an exception to the austere aesthetic that predominated. The grounds contain a "matrimonial prison" where couples wishing to divorce were confined so they could be sure they wished to end their marriage. The lockup lasted for two weeks, although the pair could leave early if they reconciled. They had to share a single bed, plate and spoon. During the three centuries that bishops resided at Biertan, just one couple ended up divorcing.

The church was occupied and robbed in 1704, during Rákóczi's War of Independence. It suffered damage during the 1977 Vrancea earthquake and subsequently underwent restoration work between 1983 and 1989. Since 1990, Saxons come annually to Biertan to celebrate their heritage. In 1993, Biertan and its fortified church were declared a UNESCO World Heritage Site; it was joined by six other places in 1999 to form the villages with fortified churches in Transylvania site. Additionally, the church is listed as a historic monument by Romania's Ministry of Culture and Religious Affairs, with each of the three fortifications considered a separate monument. Biertan was the subject of two 2011 postage stamps, a joint issue between Germany and Romania.

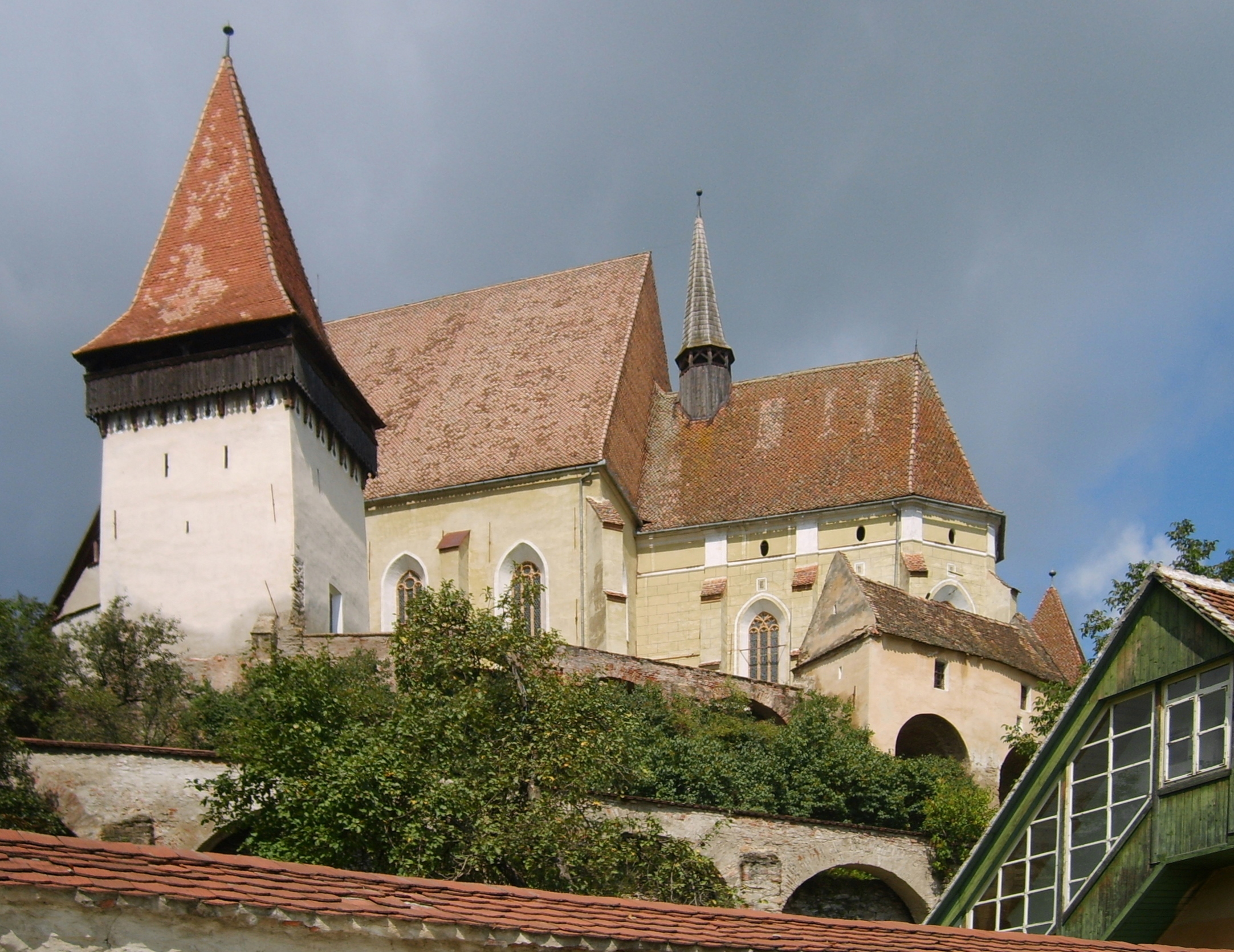
The church and its three sets of walls

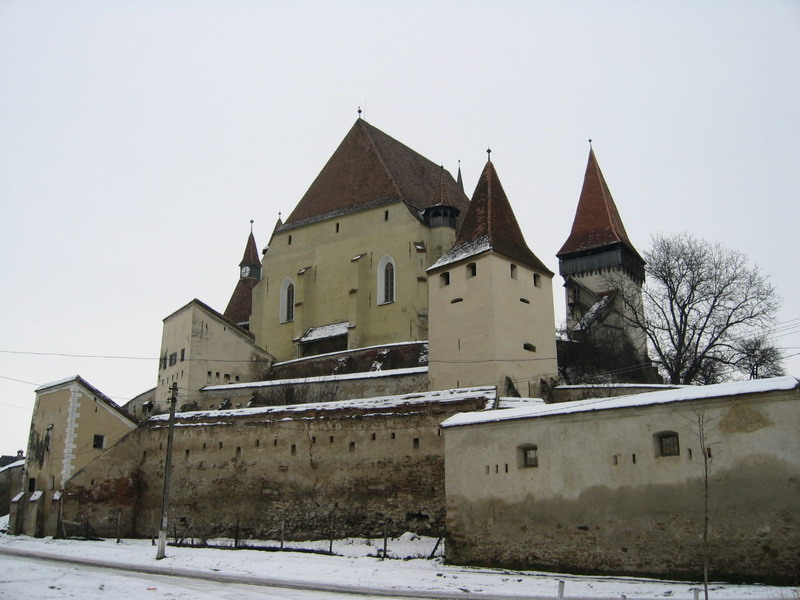
Similar view in winter

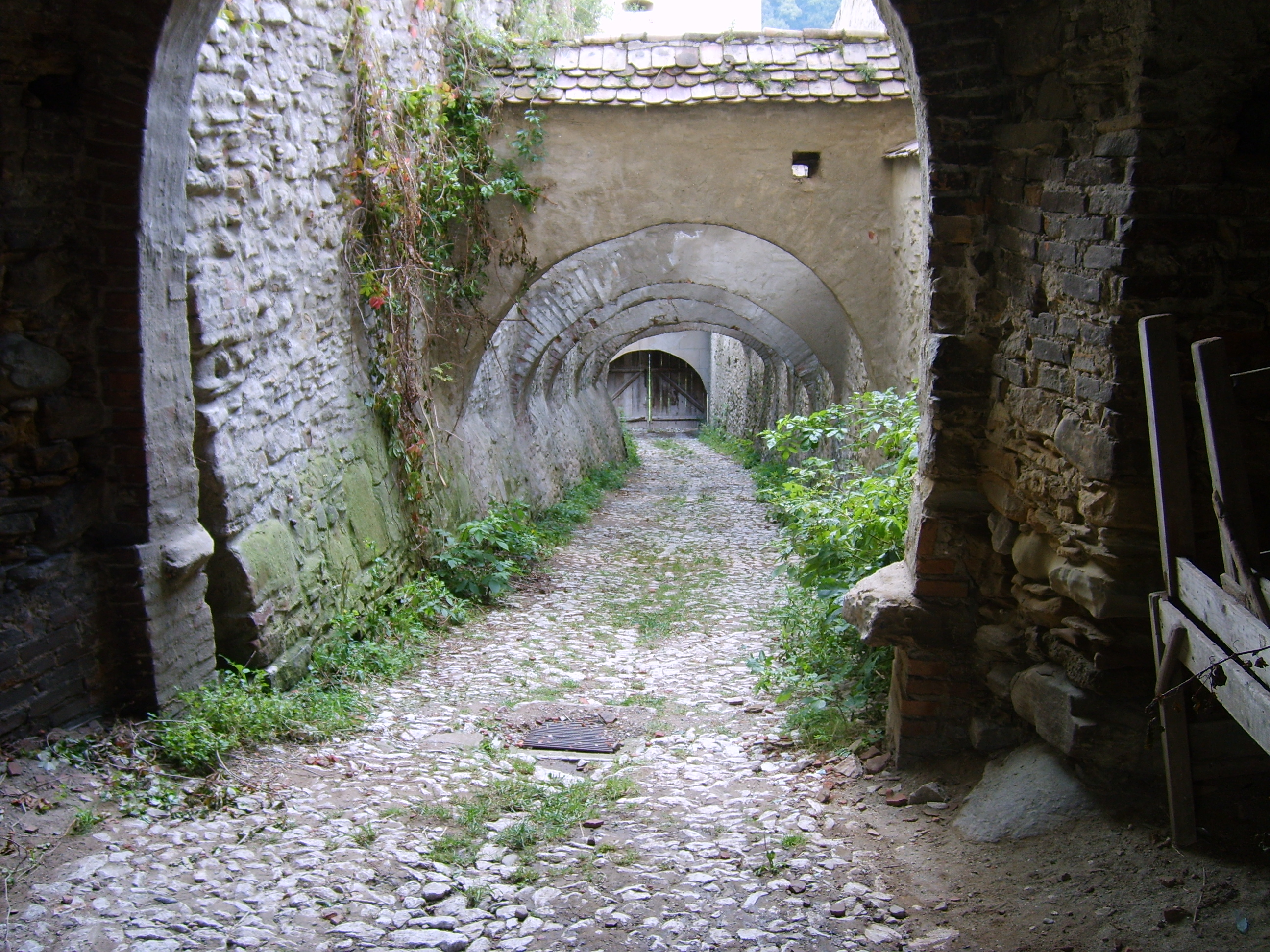
Fortification entrance

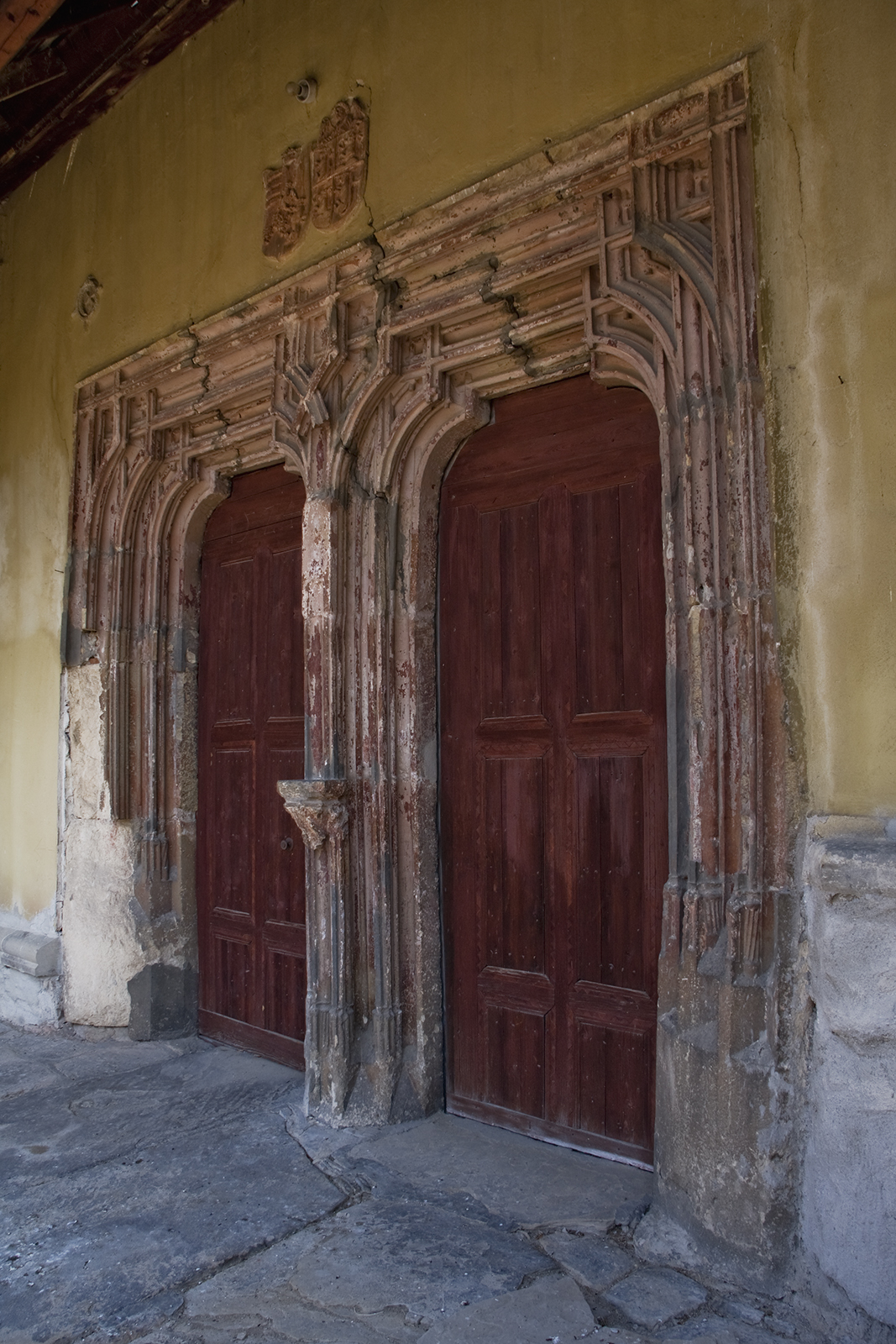
Side door to church

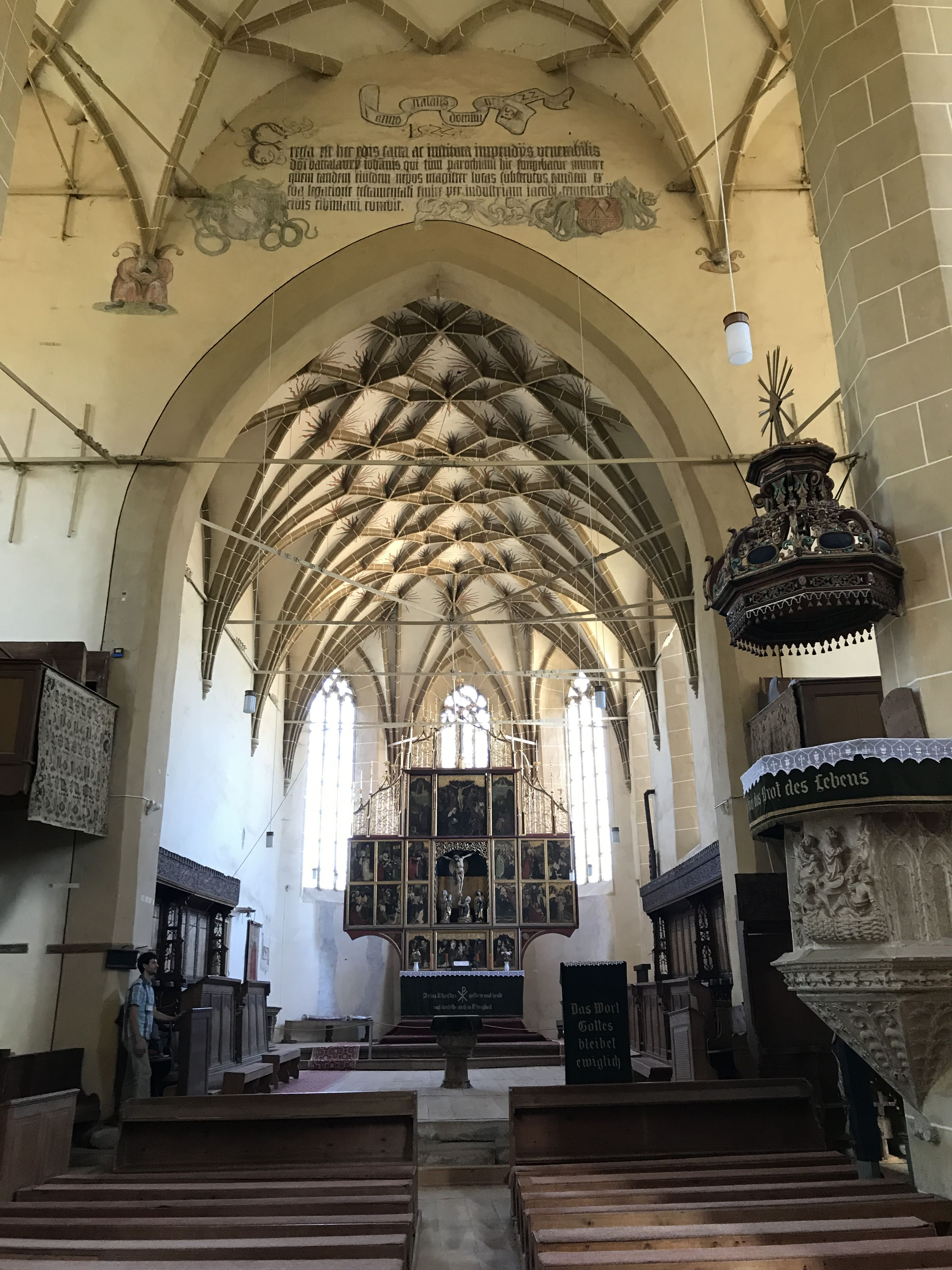
Inside the church

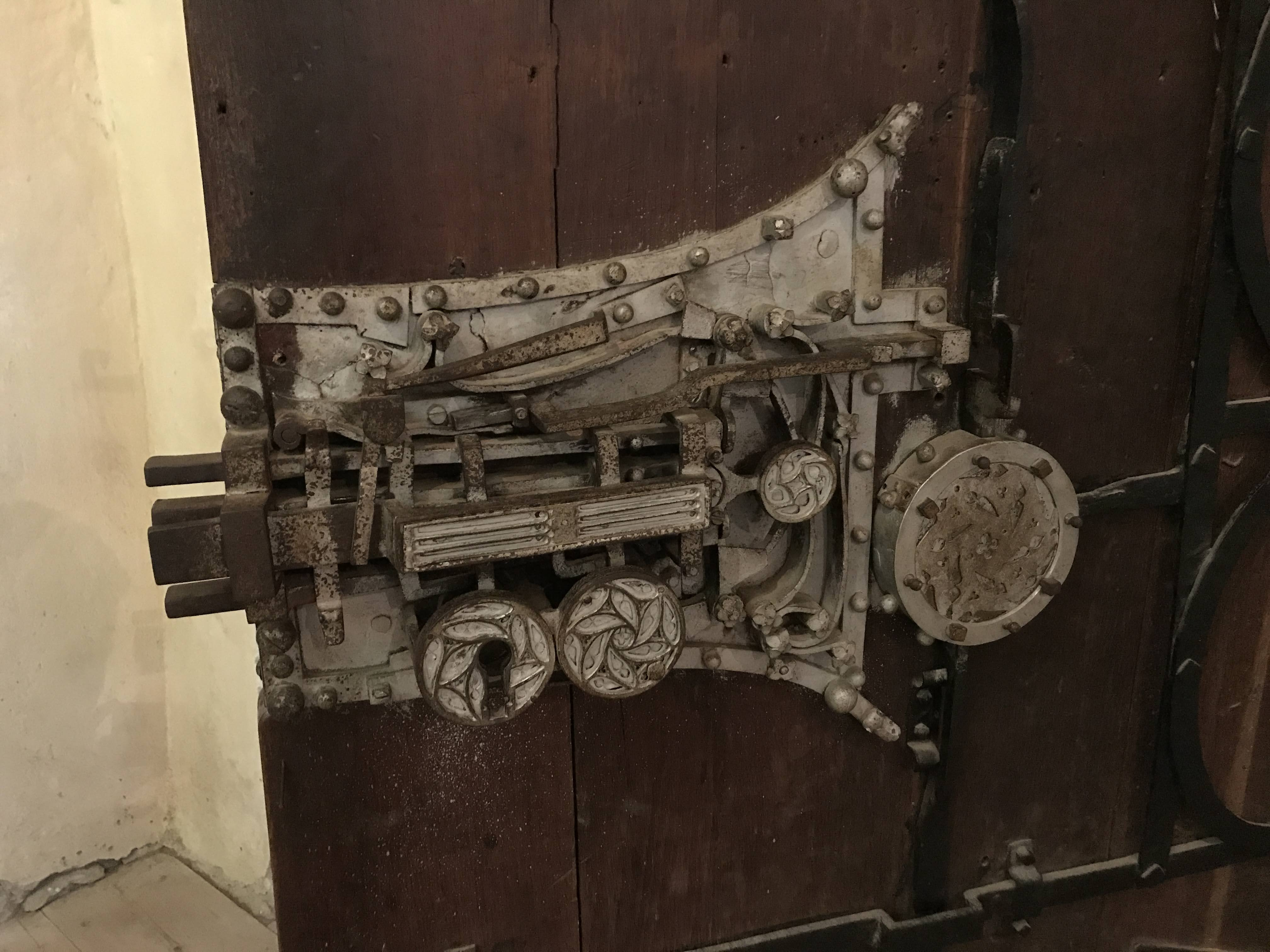
Sacristy lock

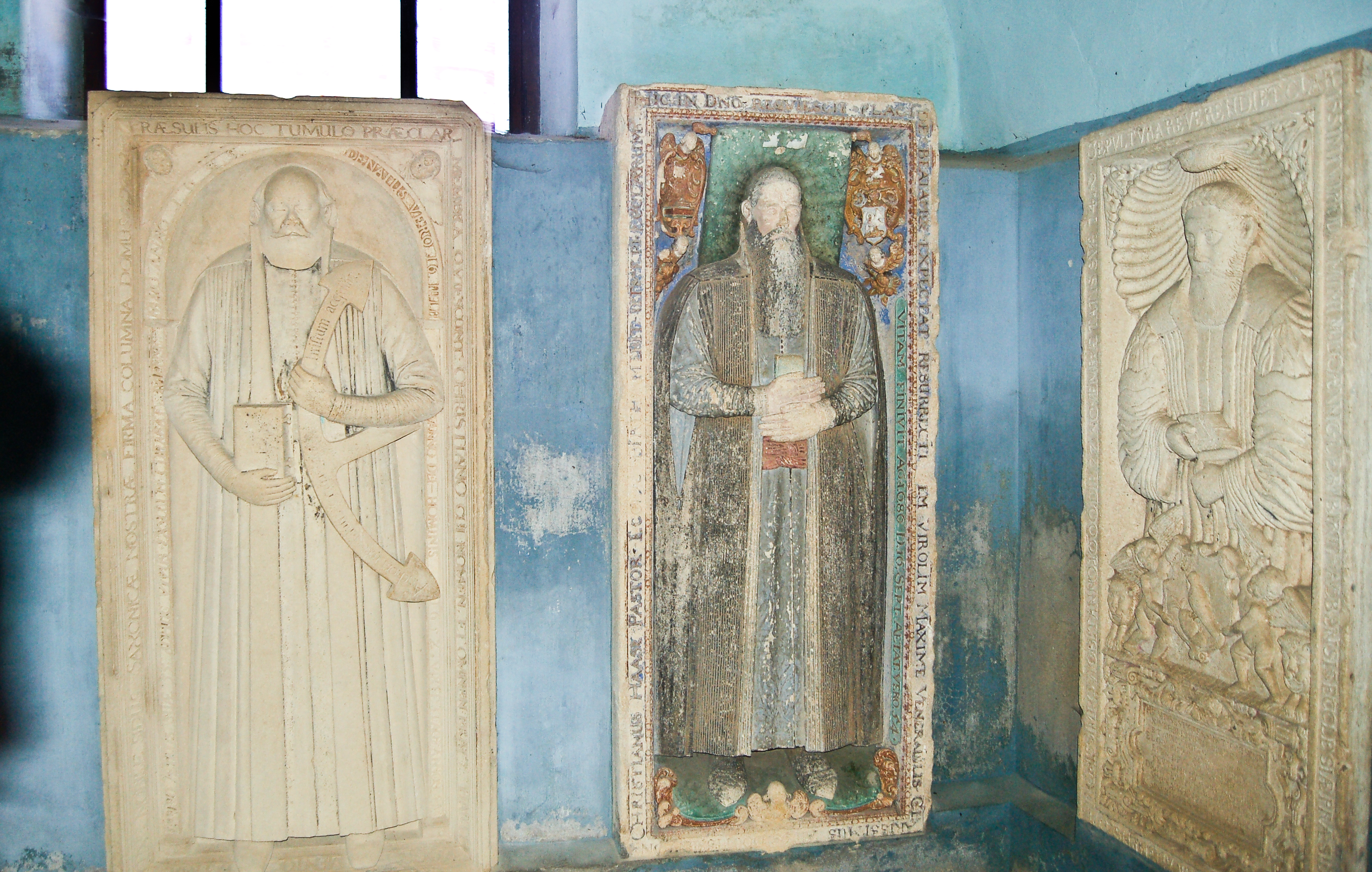
Headstones

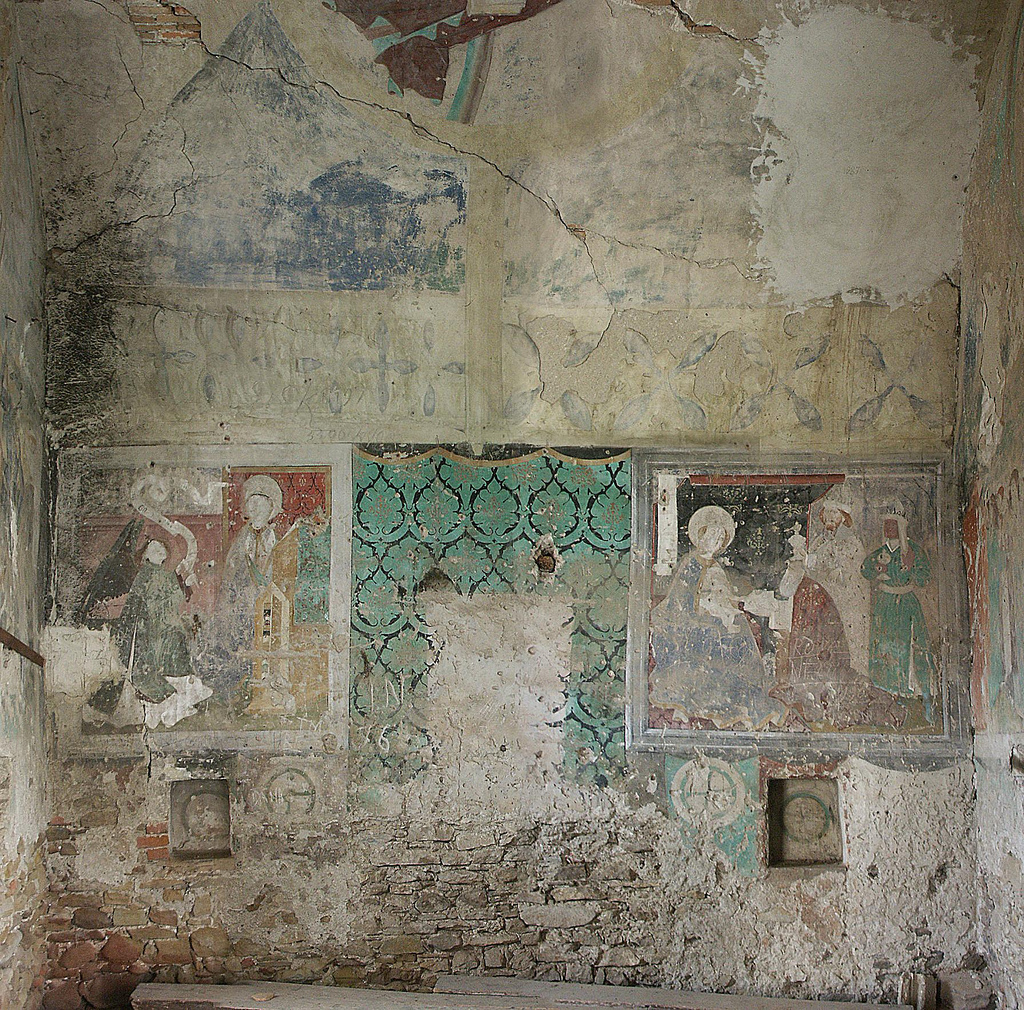
Catholic tower frescoes

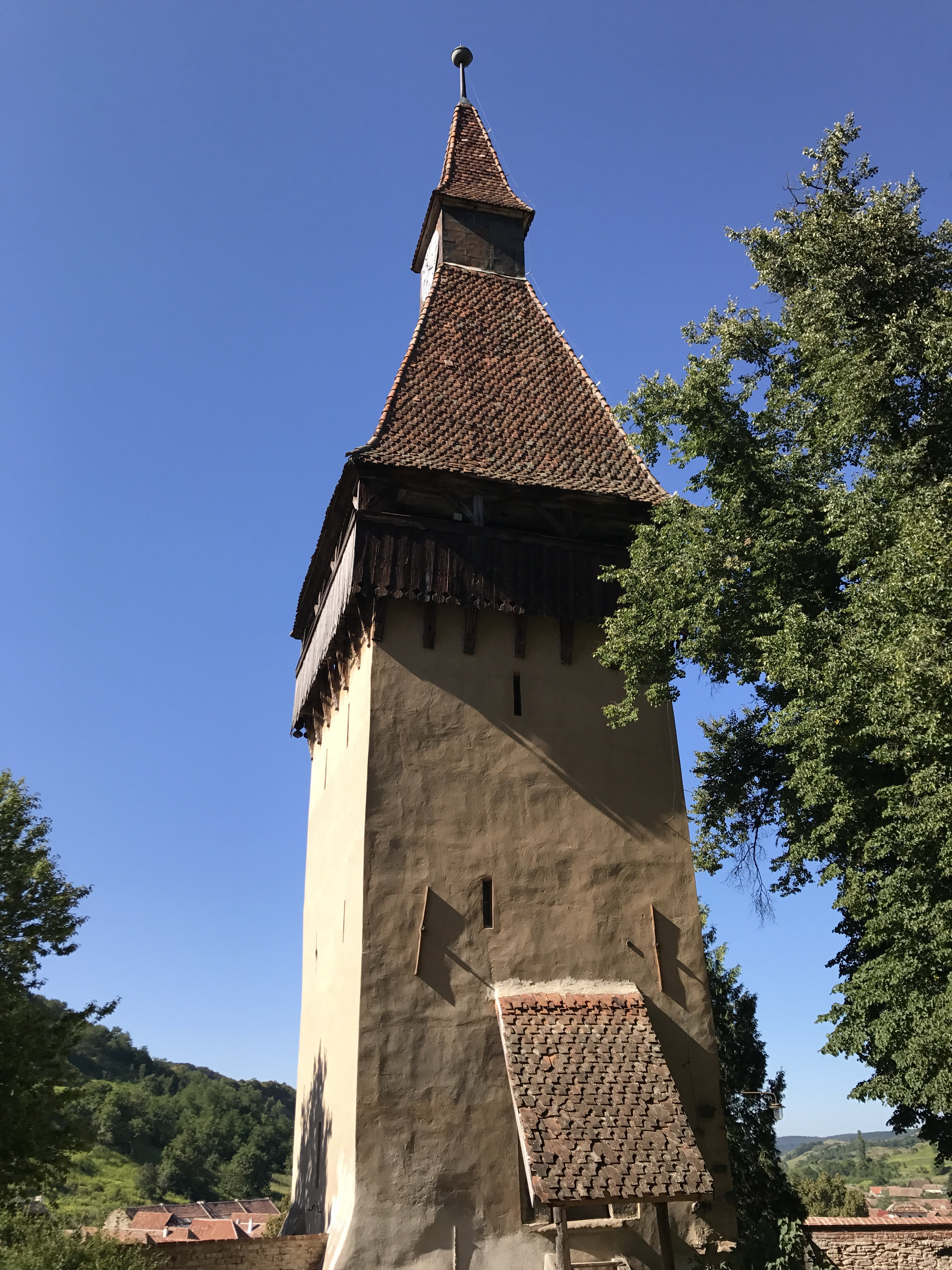
Clock tower

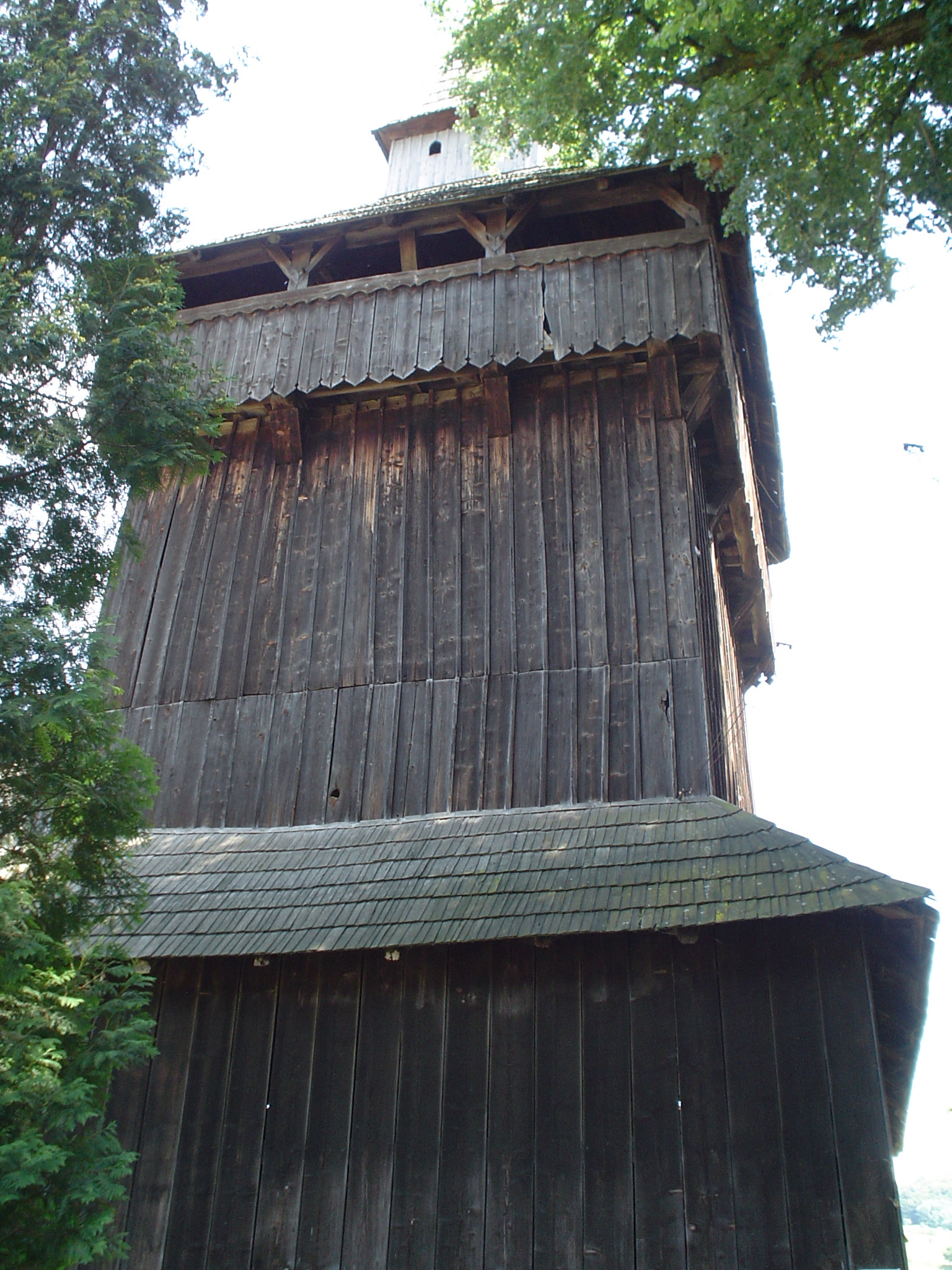
Bell tower

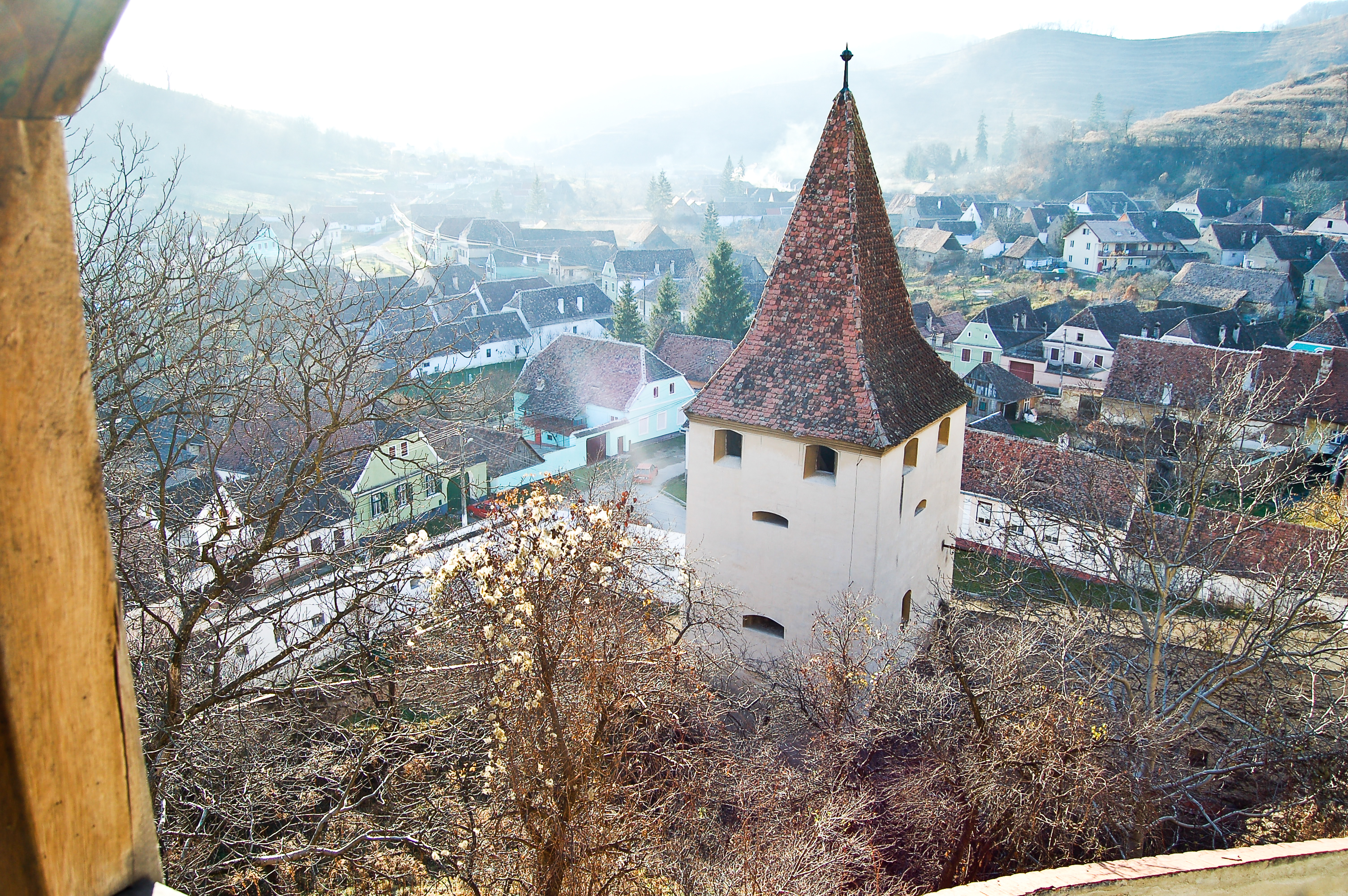
Village and gate tower

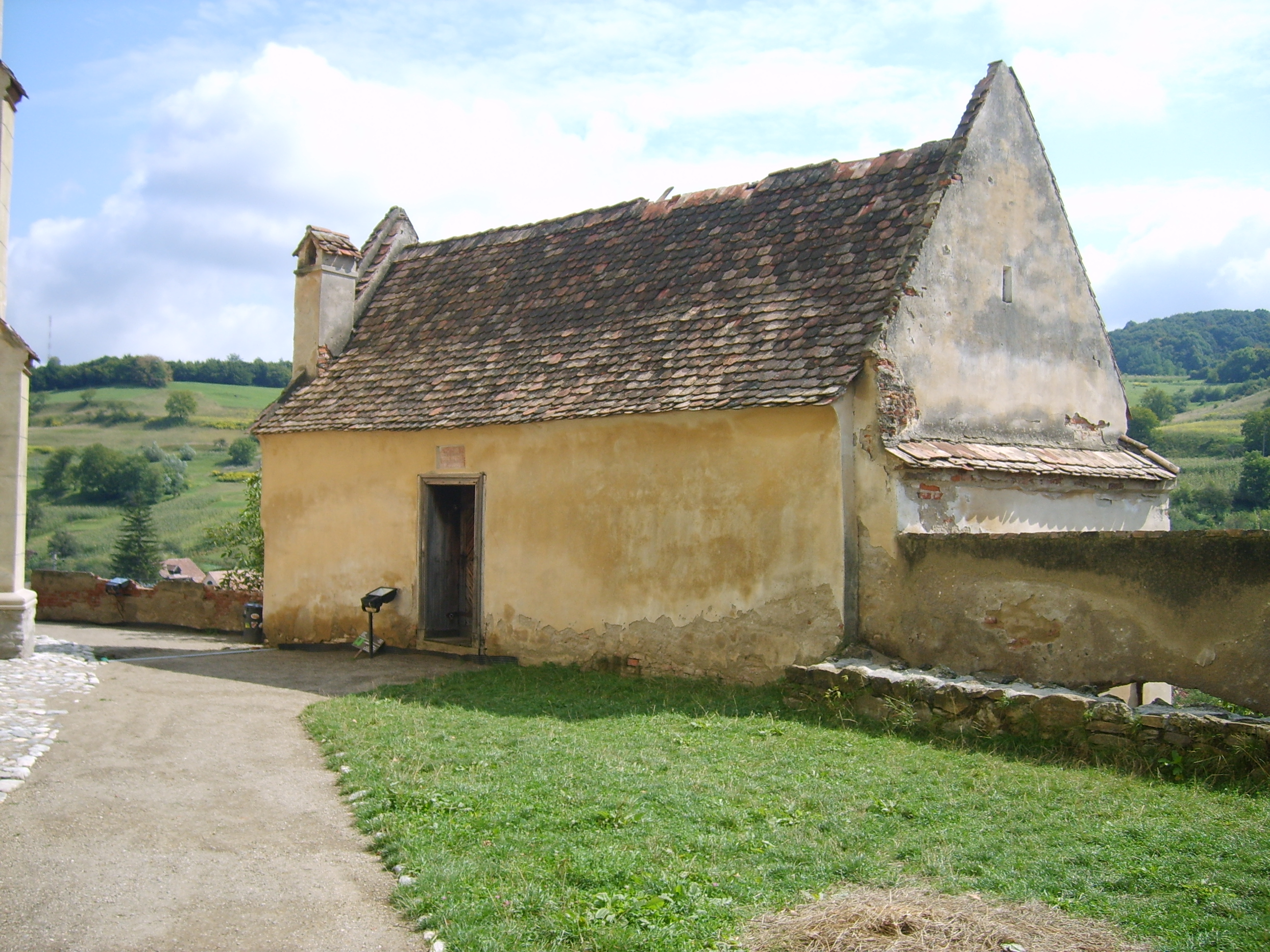
House for divorcing couples

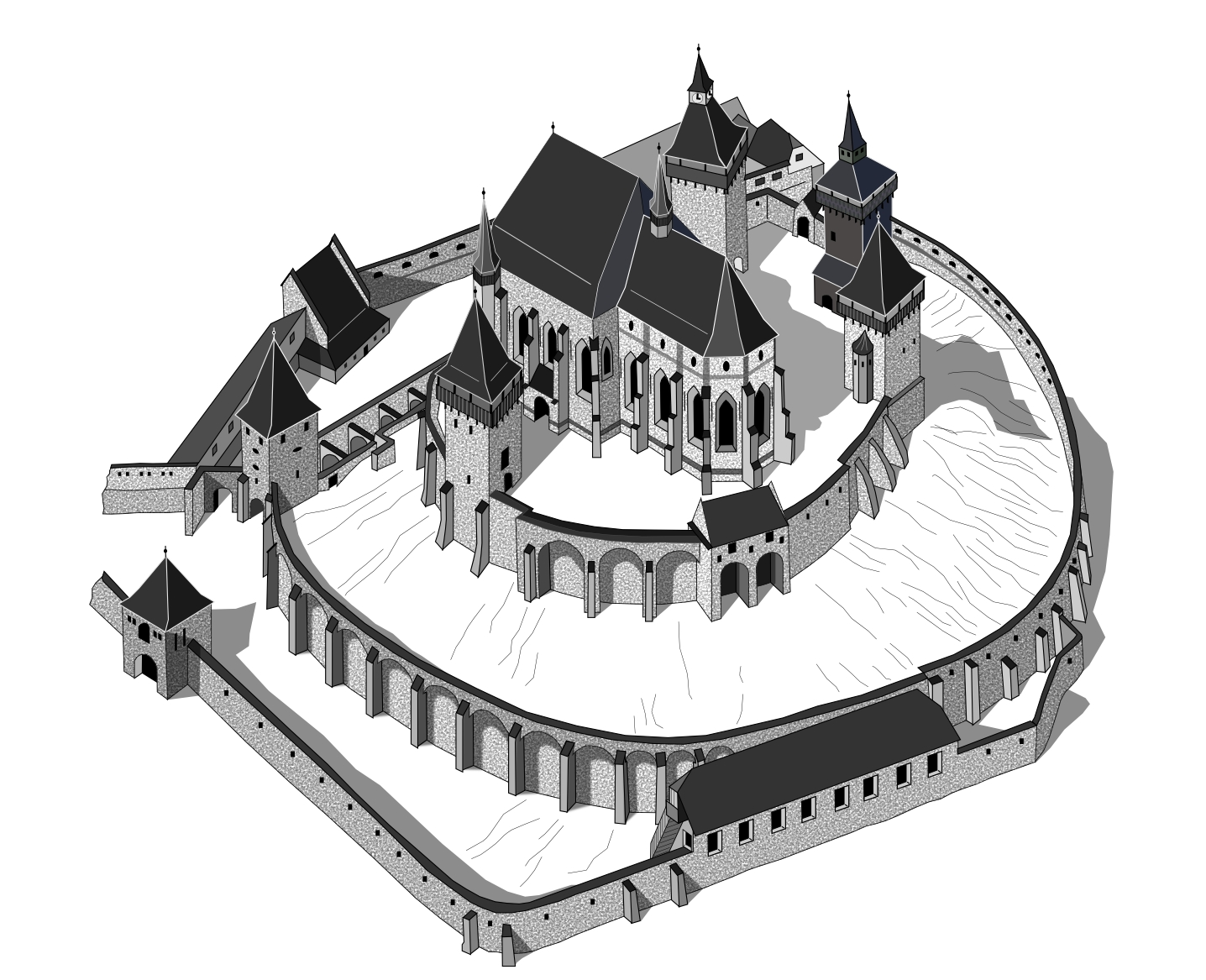
Plan
