= Georg Meyndt =

Transylvanian-Saxon author

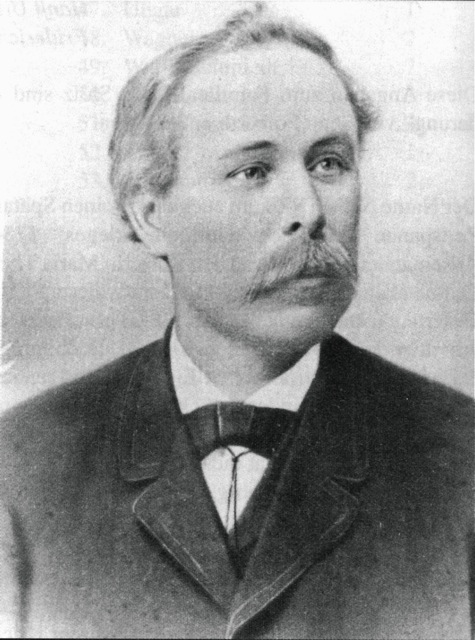
- Born: Peter Georg Meyndt; January 5, 1852; Biertan
- Died: December 17, 1907 (aged 55); Richiș
- Spouse: Sara Untch
- Children: 7

Peter Georg Meyndt (January 5, 1852 - December 17, 1903) was a Transylvanian notary and songwriter. He is known for his dialect songs in Transylvanian Saxon, which were written from orally told songs.

== Life ==
Georg Meyndt was born in Biertan as the second of seven children of the evangelical pastor Peter Traugott Meyndt from Mediasch and his wife, Regina, from Schäßburg. The family moved several times because the father was appointed as a pastor in different places - Biertan, Irmesch, Nimesch and Großkopisch. Four of Meyndt's siblings died at a young age - so he left education and worked as a notary in Eibesdorf and Reichesdorf. He also worked as a farmer and operated a grain mill, however this proved to be unprofitable. He married Sara Untch, with whom he had seven children, four daughters and three sons.

While Meyndt was not very successful as a farmer and mill operator, his true talent and passion was music. He began to compose popular songs and to perform them on his lute or guitar at festivities. His goal was to strengthen the village community and positively influence the youth, for which he saw socializing as the best means. He organized gatherings involving theatre and singing as well as excursions to other Saxon towns and to the mountains. He composed the melodies of his songs himself, although he had no training and could not read music.

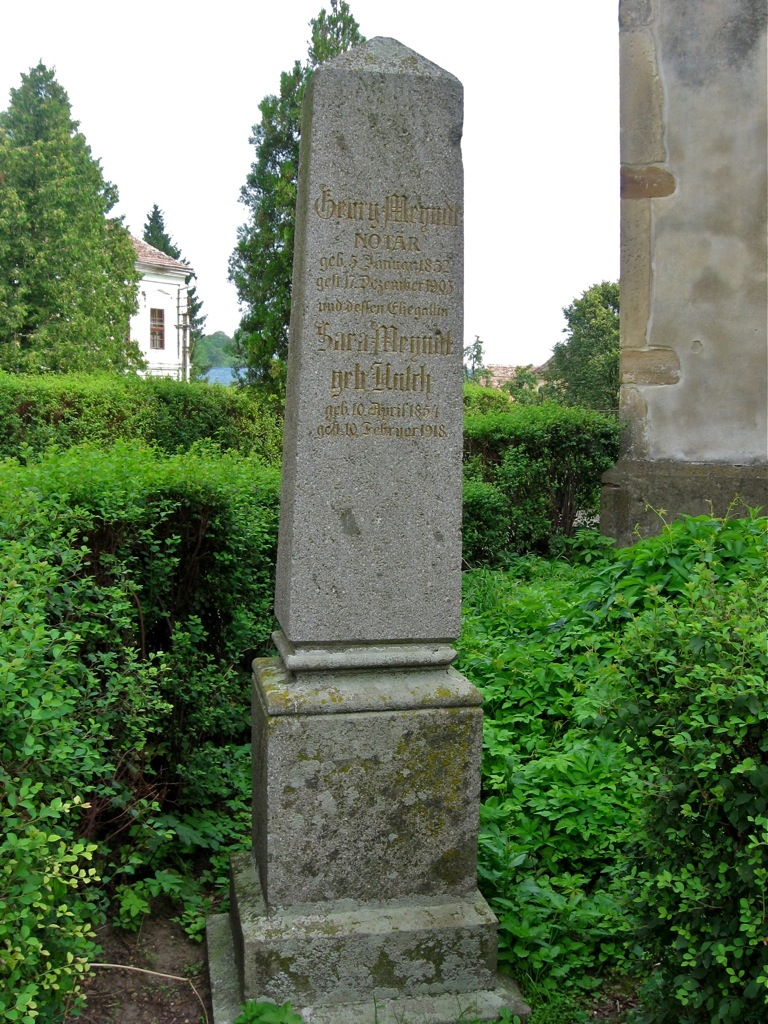
Gravestone of Gerorg Meyndt

His popular songs spread quickly among the Transylvanian Saxons and became part of folk culture. They were passed from one singing group to another, while the author's name mostly remained unknown. His dialect songs marked the beginning of the dialect songs movement in Transylvania. In addition to his own songs, he was also open to the works of other authors; it was he who first publicly performed the song "Holderstrauch" by Hermann Kirchner, who came from Thuringia and moved to Mediasch. He took a trip to Burzenland, which he undertook with his choir in 1897, made the song, now performed in Transylvanian-Saxon, known.

The high school teacher and later pastor of Reichesdorf, Carl Römer, who wrote the melody, wrote down 19 songs by Georg Meyndt for the first time in 1899. Römer did this entirely by ear.

Meyndt himself felt encouraged by this recognition and subsequently published two songbooks. In 1901 "Sanktich äm Aren" (Harvest Sunday) was published, containing six of his songs, and in 1902 the singspiel "Äus âser Gemîn" (From Our Community), containing six dialect songs. A year later, however, Meyndt died, on December 17, 1903, in Reichesdorf, where he was also buried.

== Legacy ==
Together with the immigrant Hermann Kirchner, Georg Meyndt is today regarded as the founder of the singing movement among the Transylvanian Saxons. They were the first to write popular songs in dialect, inspiring later authors such as Rudolf Lassel, Otto Piringer, Heinrich Bretz, Anna Schuller-Schullerus, Carl Reich, Andreas Nikolaus, Hans Mild, Fritz Schuller and Grete Lienert-Zultner. His friend and singing colleague Carl Reich collected his songs and published a part of them posthumously for the first time in 1914 under the title "Kut, mer sängen int" (Come on, let's sing one) in Sibiu. This includes the 19 songs by Georg Meyndt, which were initially only written down by hand, as well as eleven other anonymous authors.

Some of his songs were published after the Second World War in periodical writings and anthological songbooks, for example in "Siebenbürgen, Land des Segens" by Erich Phleps in the Wort-und-Welt-Verlag Innsbruck and in "Lieder der Heimat" by Norbert Petri. Finally, in 2008, the Mannheim professor of music theory, Heinz Acker, from Sibiu, published a complete collection of all of Georg Meyndt's surviving folk songs and Singspiele.

His tombstone, which was vandalised over several times, is now at a church in Reichesdorf. His former home, 100 meters away, was to be converted into a supermarket in 2010. After a protest by the Hermannstädter Zeitung, the Monuments Office of the district of Hermannstadt ordered construction to be halted.

== Songs ==
- Det Brännchen (The Little Fountain)
- Gaden Morjen (Good Morning)
- Et song e schatzich Vijelchen (A sweet little bird sang)
- Ech hat e Medchen ist begent (I met a girl once)
- Wat mauchst ta Gang mät deger Kah? (Boy what are you doing with your cow?)
- Motterhärz, ta Ädelstin (Mother's heart, you jewel)
- Sanktichklok (Sunday bell)
