= Biertan =

- Commune
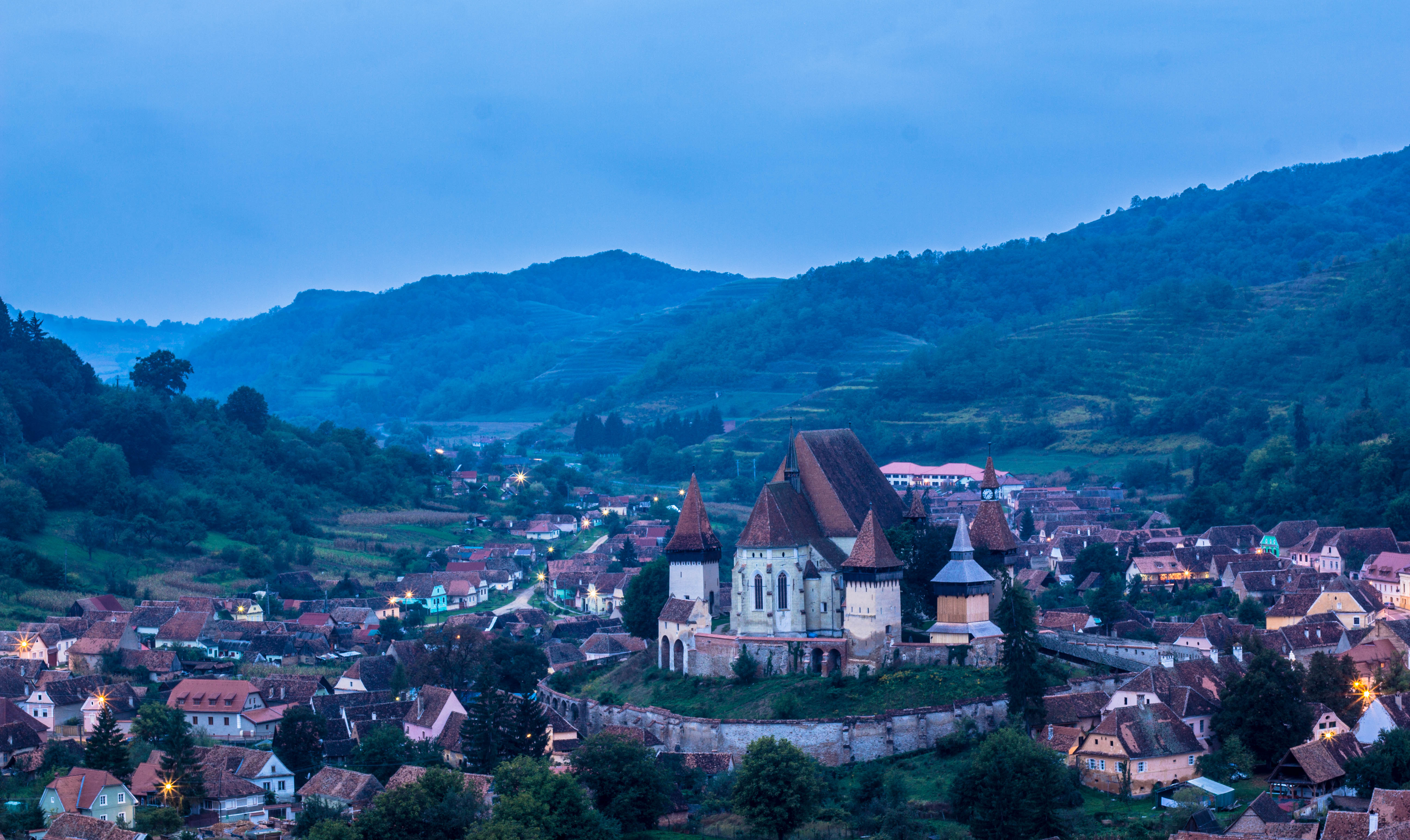
- Biertan fortified church

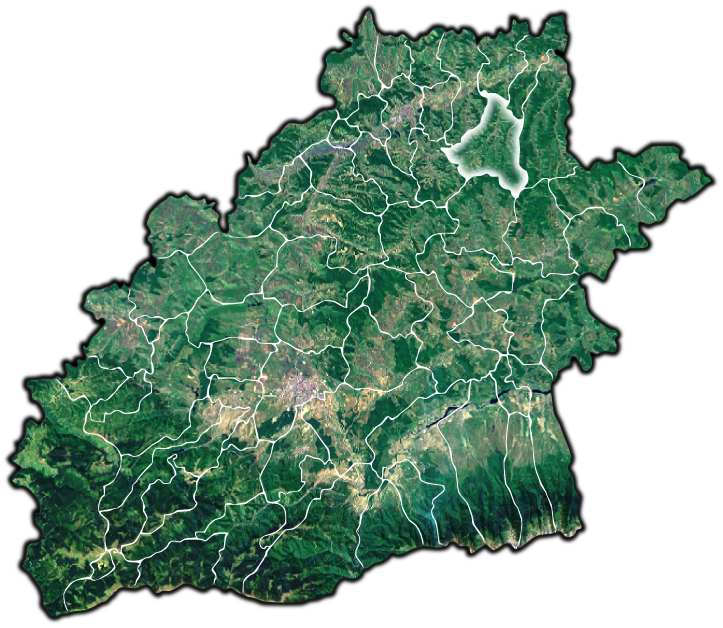
- Location in Sibiu County

- Location in Romania
- Coordinates: 46°8′23″N 24°31′25″E
- Country: Romania
- County: Sibiu
- Established: 1224 (first official record)

Government
  - Mayor (2020–2024): Mircea Dragomir (PNL)
- Area: 97.26 km^{2} (37.55 sq mi)
- Elevation: 388 m (1,273 ft)
- Population (2021-12-01): 2,239
  - Density: 23.02/km^{2} (59.62/sq mi)
- Time zone: UTC+02:00 (EET)
  - Summer (DST): UTC+03:00 (EEST)
- Postal code: 557045
- Area code: (+40) 0269
- Vehicle reg.: SB
- Website: www.comunabiertan.ro

Biertan (German: Birthälm; Transylvanian Saxon dialect: Birthälm/Bierthalmen/Bierthalm; Hungarian: Berethalom) is a commune in Sibiu County, Transylvania, Romania. The commune is composed of three villages: Biertan, Copșa Mare (German: Gross-Kopisch; Hungarian: Nagykapus), and Richiș (German: Reichesdorf; Hungarian: Riomfalva), each of which has a fortified church.

Biertan is one of the most important Saxon villages with fortified churches in Transylvania, having been on the list of UNESCO World Heritage Sites since 1993. The Biertan fortified church was the seat of the Evangelical Lutheran Bishop in Transylvania between 1572 and 1867.

The route of the Via Transilvanica long-distance trail passes through all three villages in the commune.

== Geography ==
The commune is situated on the Transylvanian Plateau, at an altitude of 388 m (1,273 ft), on the banks of the rivers Biertan and Vale. It is located in the north of Sibiu County, 21 km (13 mi) east of Mediaș and 66 km (41 mi) northeast of the county seat, Sibiu.

== History ==
The first documentary testimony about the village dates from 1283 in a document about the taxes paid by the inhabitants of 7 villages and so it is believed to have been founded sometime between 1224 and 1283 by Transylvanian Saxons. The village settlement quickly developed into an important market town and by 1510 Biertan supported a population of about 5,000 people. Between 1468 and the 16th century a small fortified church (German: Kirchenburg/Wehrkirche) was constructed and developed. After the medieval period, the settlement declined in importance with the rise of neighbouring Sighișoara (German: Schäßburg), Sibiu (German: Hermannstadt), and Mediaș (German: Mediasch).

In the Romanian census of 1930, Biertan had 2,331 inhabitants, of whom 1,228 were Transylvanian Saxons. During World War II many men were conscripted into the Romanian Army and later on forcefully drafted in the Waffen-SS. After the war, many Transylvanian Saxons were deported from the region to labour camps in the former Soviet Union (USSR). During communism, many left for West Germany. Following the collapse of communism in 1989, many more left for Germany.

Today the whole commune has a population of about 2,500 and the village of Biertan alone has about 1,600 people. It is one of the most visited villages in Transylvania, being the historically important place of the annual reunion of the Transylvanian Saxons, many of whom now live in Germany.

== Festivals ==
The "Lună Plină" ("Full Moon") Horror and Fantasy Film Festival takes place in Biertan. It is the only film festival in Romania focused exclusively on fantasy movies.

== Natives ==
- Georg Meyndt (1852–1903), Transylvania Saxon songwriter
- Johann Peter Migendt (1703–1767), organ builder
- Artur Phleps (1881–1944), a Biertan-born military career officer. He, uniquely, served in the Habsburg army of Austria-Hungary, the royal army of Romania and finally the Waffen-SS.
- Nicolae Popoviciu (1903–1960), bishop

== Demographics ==
According to the 2011 census, the commune had a population of 2,590; of those, 73.8% were Romanians, 17.9% Roma, 4.6% Germans (more specifically Transylvanian Saxons), and 3.6% Hungarians. At the 2021 census, Biertan had a population of 2,239; of those, 66.19% were Romanians, 19.83% Roma, 3.22% Germans, and 2.32% Hungarians.

== Gallery ==
The former home of Sara Römischer, in the old Kirchgasse (i.e., church alley) of Biertan/Birthälm

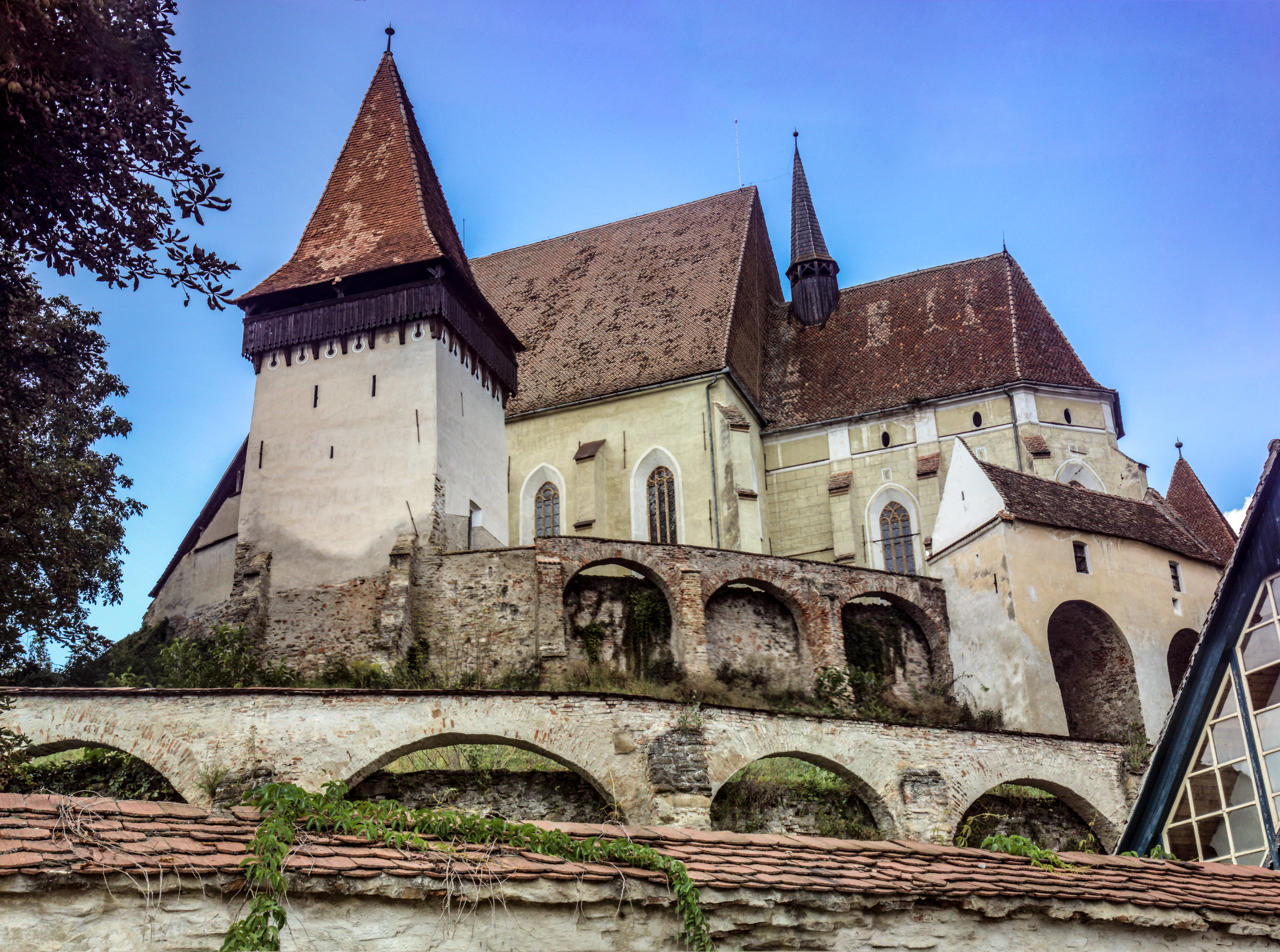
Close-up view of the Biertan/Birthälm fortified church

Footage of Biertan from 2010

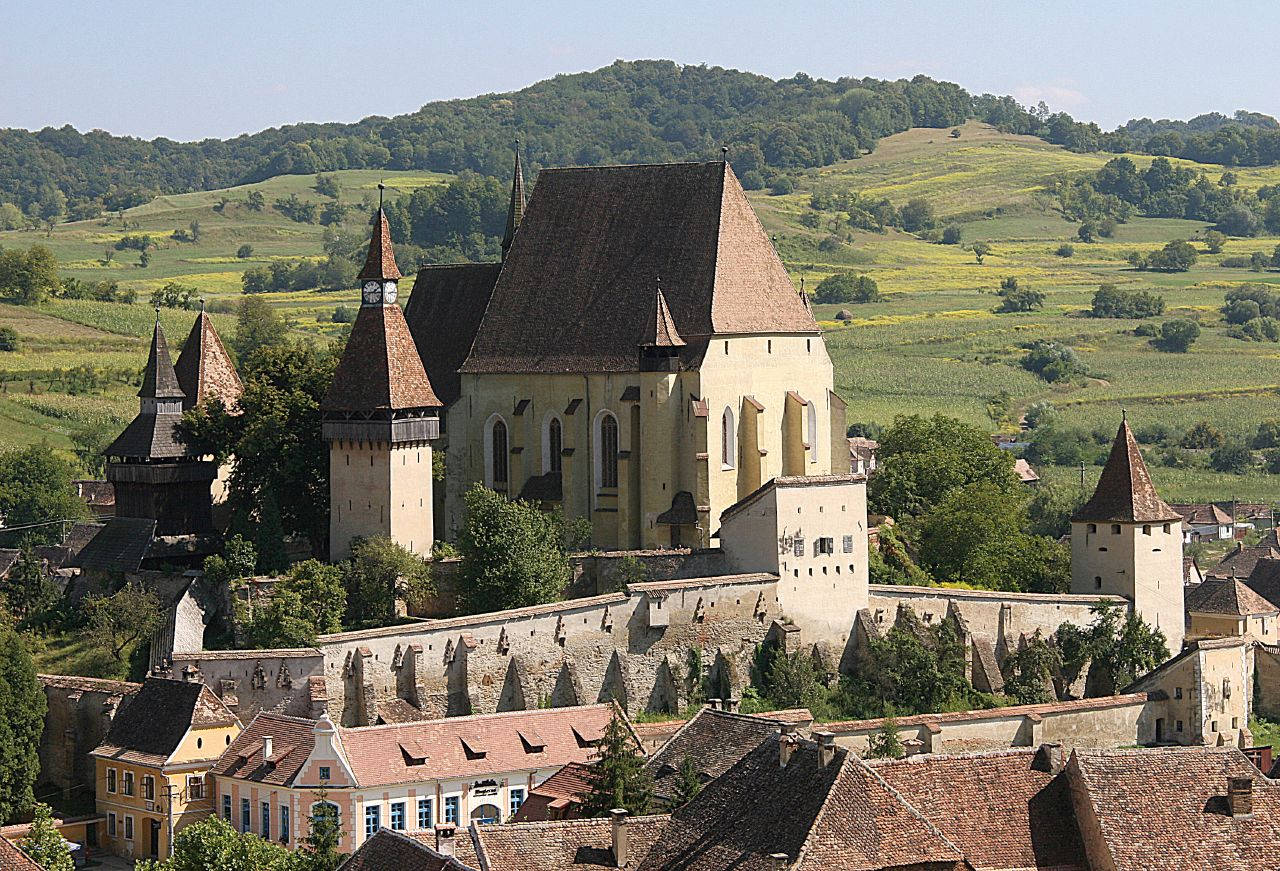
The Evangelical Lutheran medieval fortified church of Biertan/Birthälm during autumn

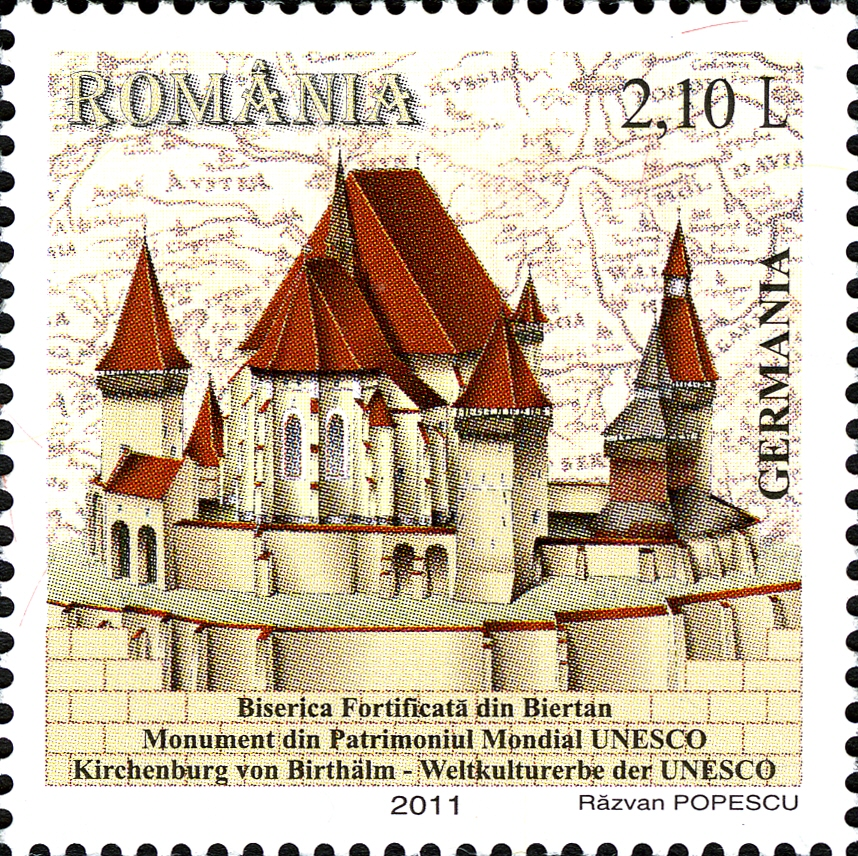
Biertan on a 2011 Romanian stamp

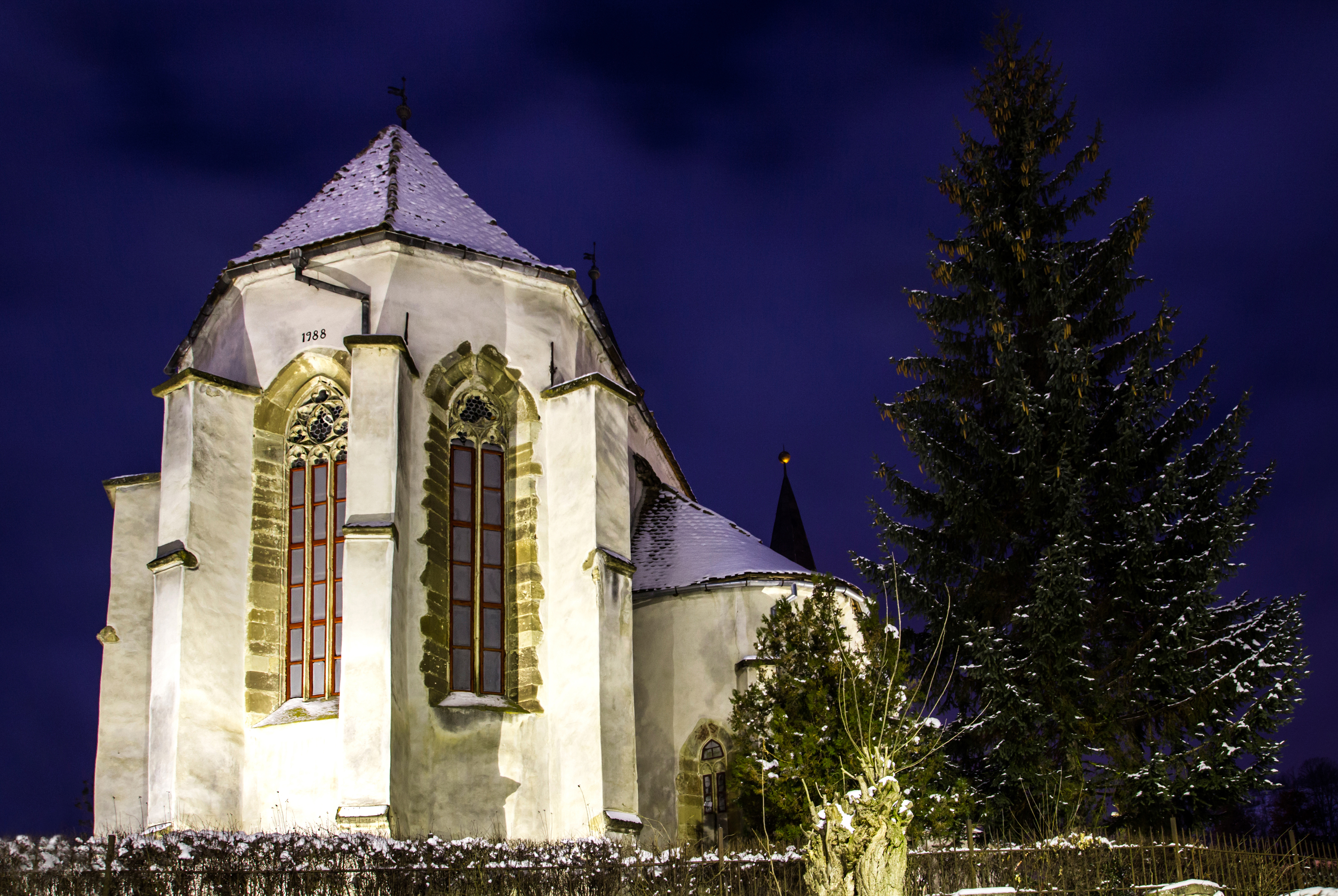
Medieval fortified Evangelical Lutheran church in Richiș/Reichesdorf

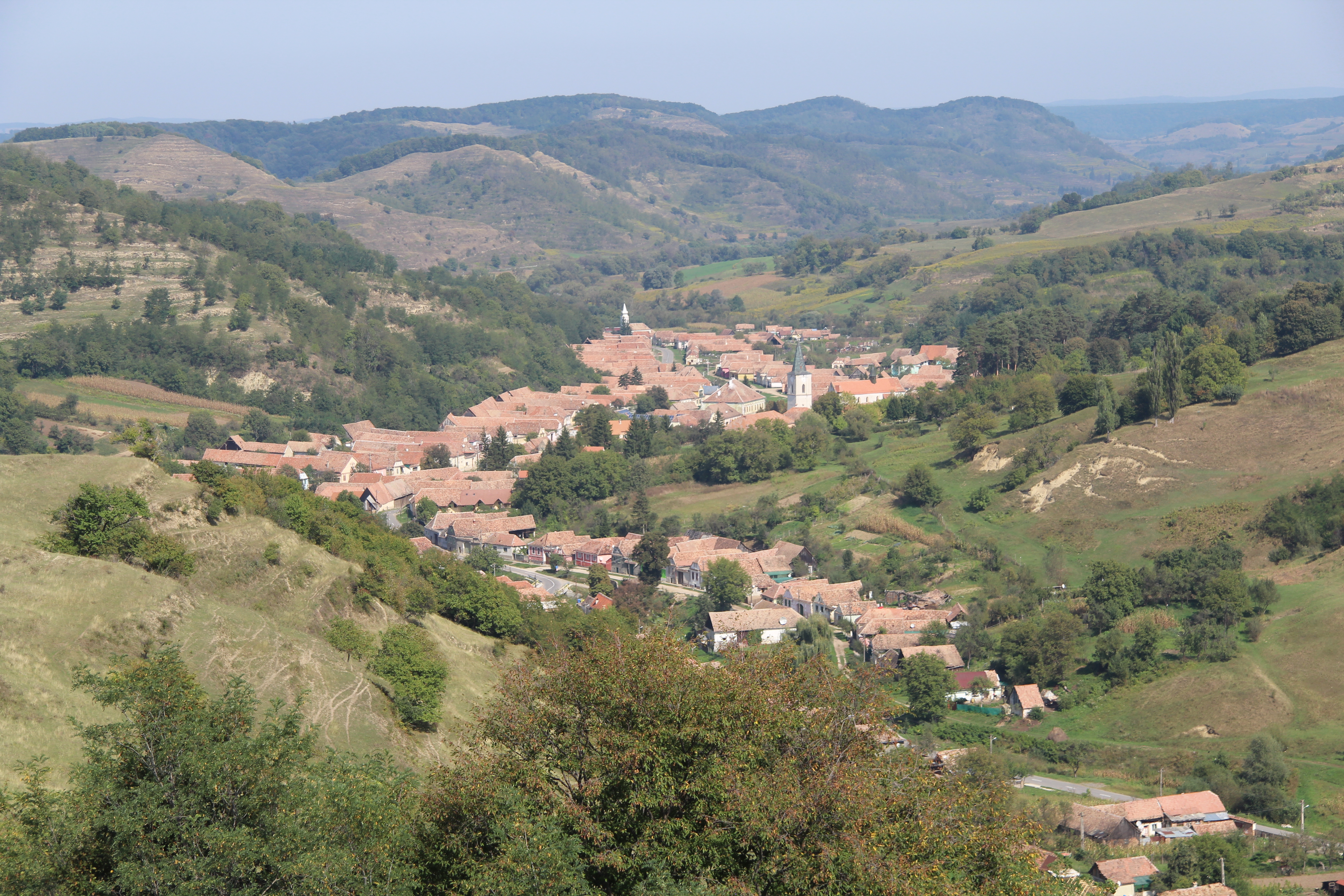
Aerial view of Richiș/Reichesdorf

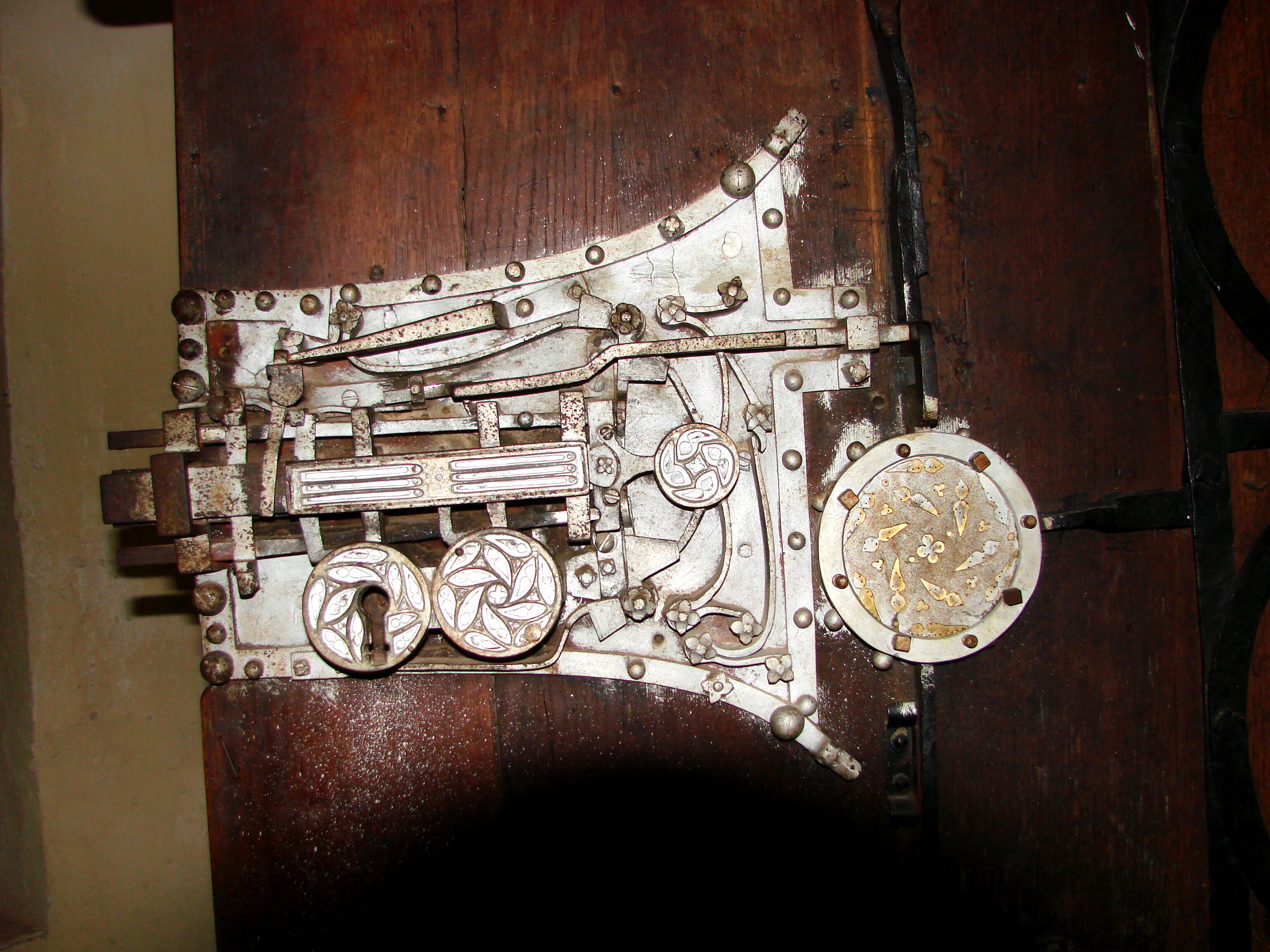
Lock on a wooden door in the church at Biertan. The lock contains 19 locks in one. It won first prize at the Paris World Expo in 1900.

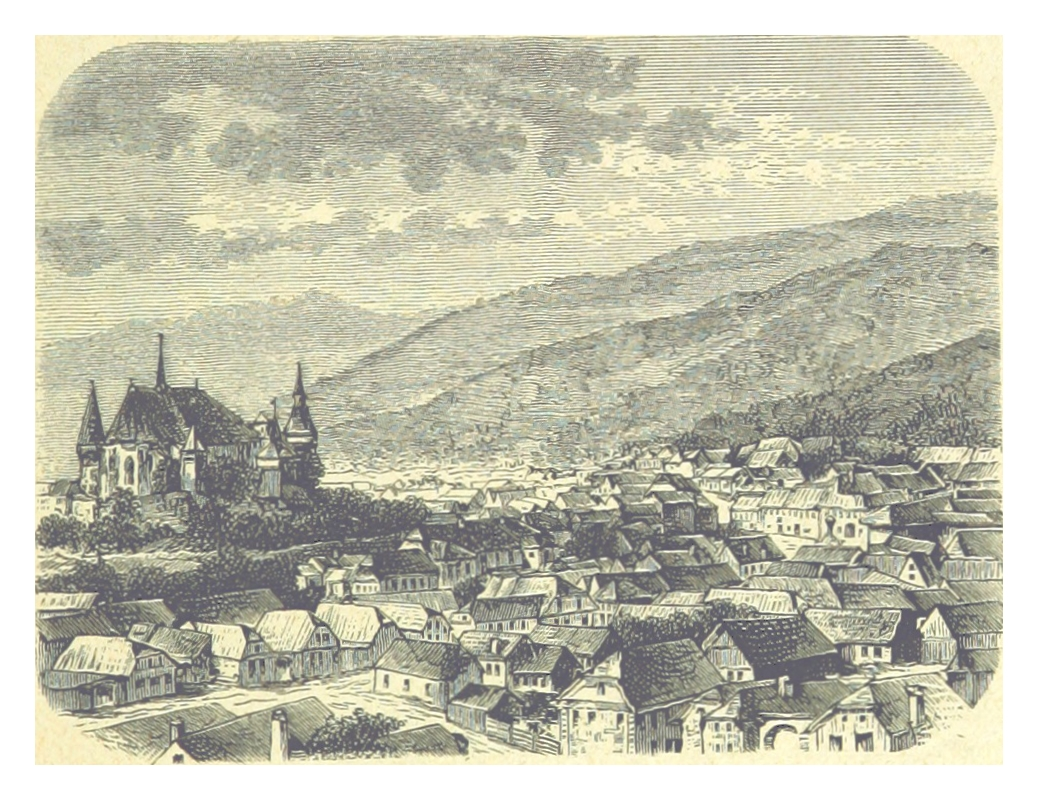
Biertan in 1881, digitized copy from the British Library

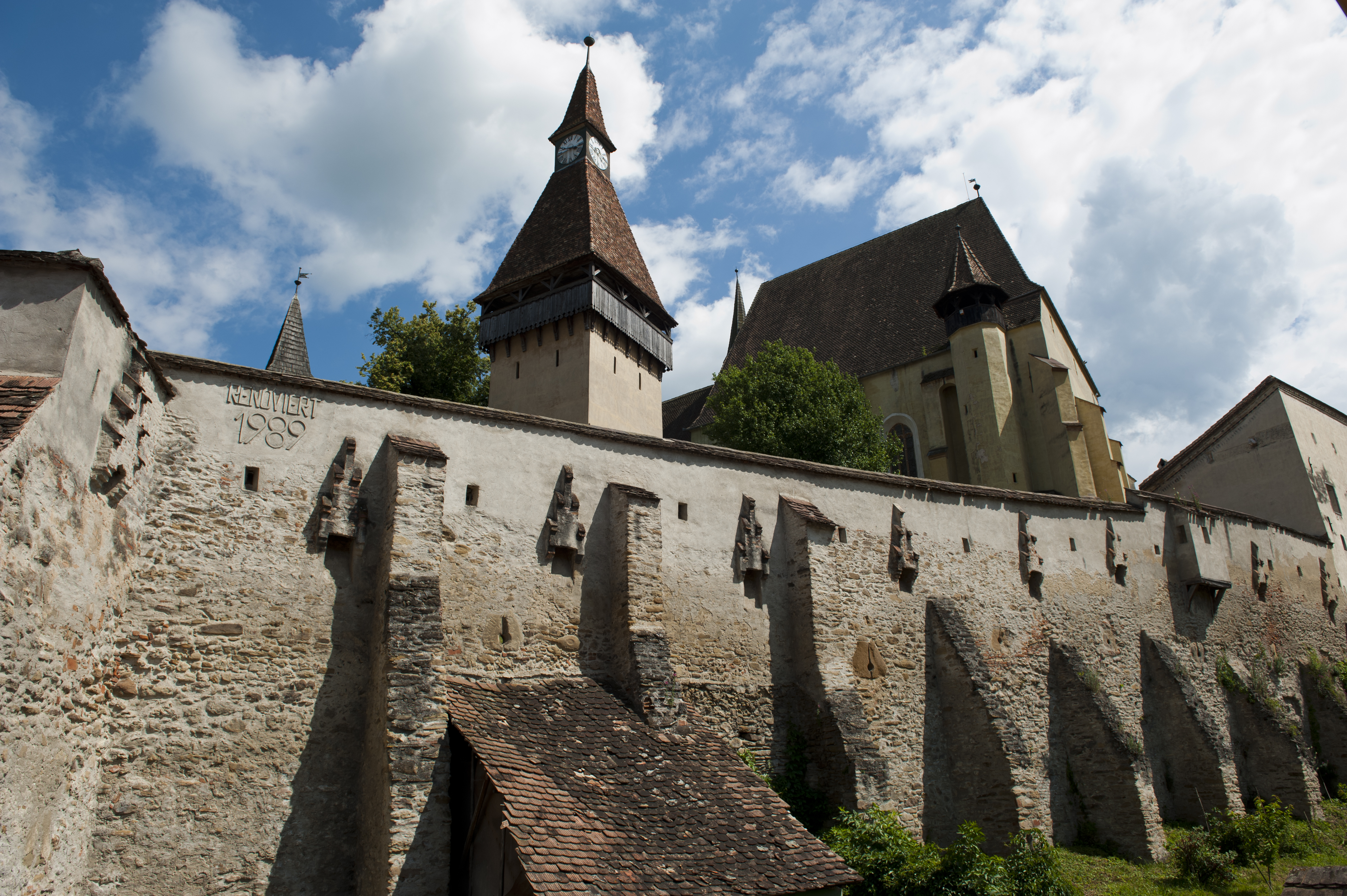
Ensemble of the Evangelical fortified church

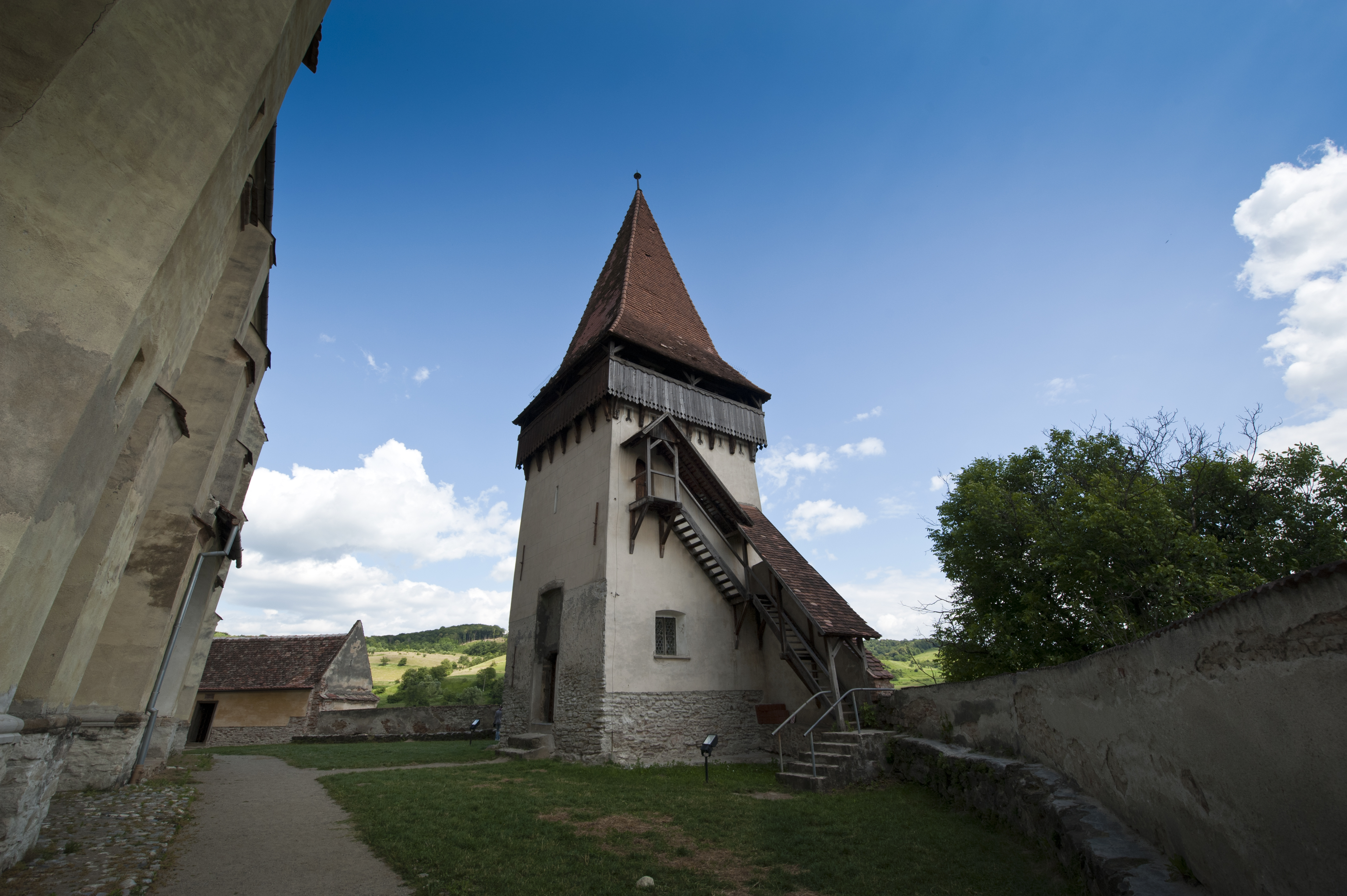
Indoor fortified enclosure with three towers, bastion and gate tower

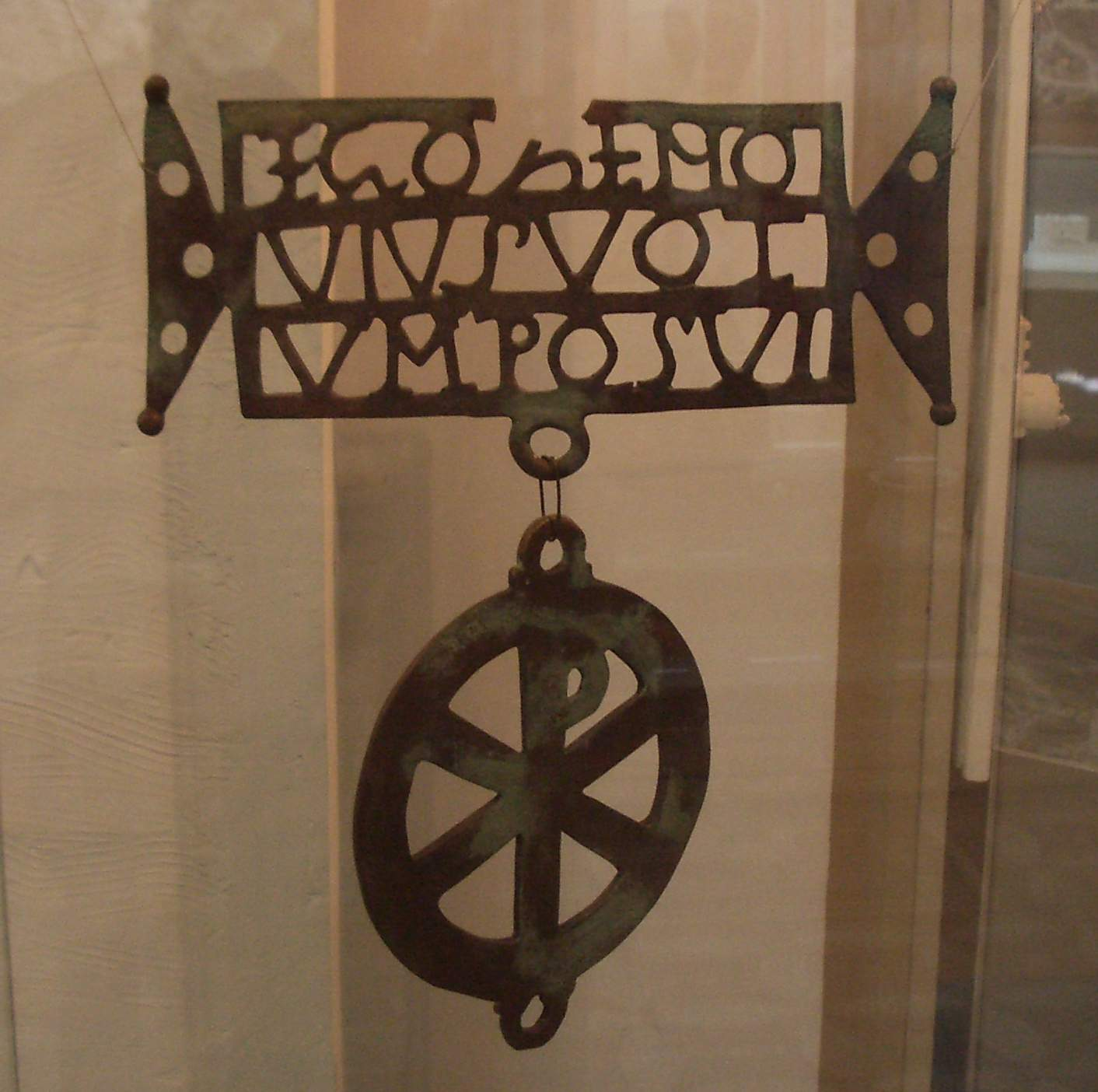
Biertan Donarium

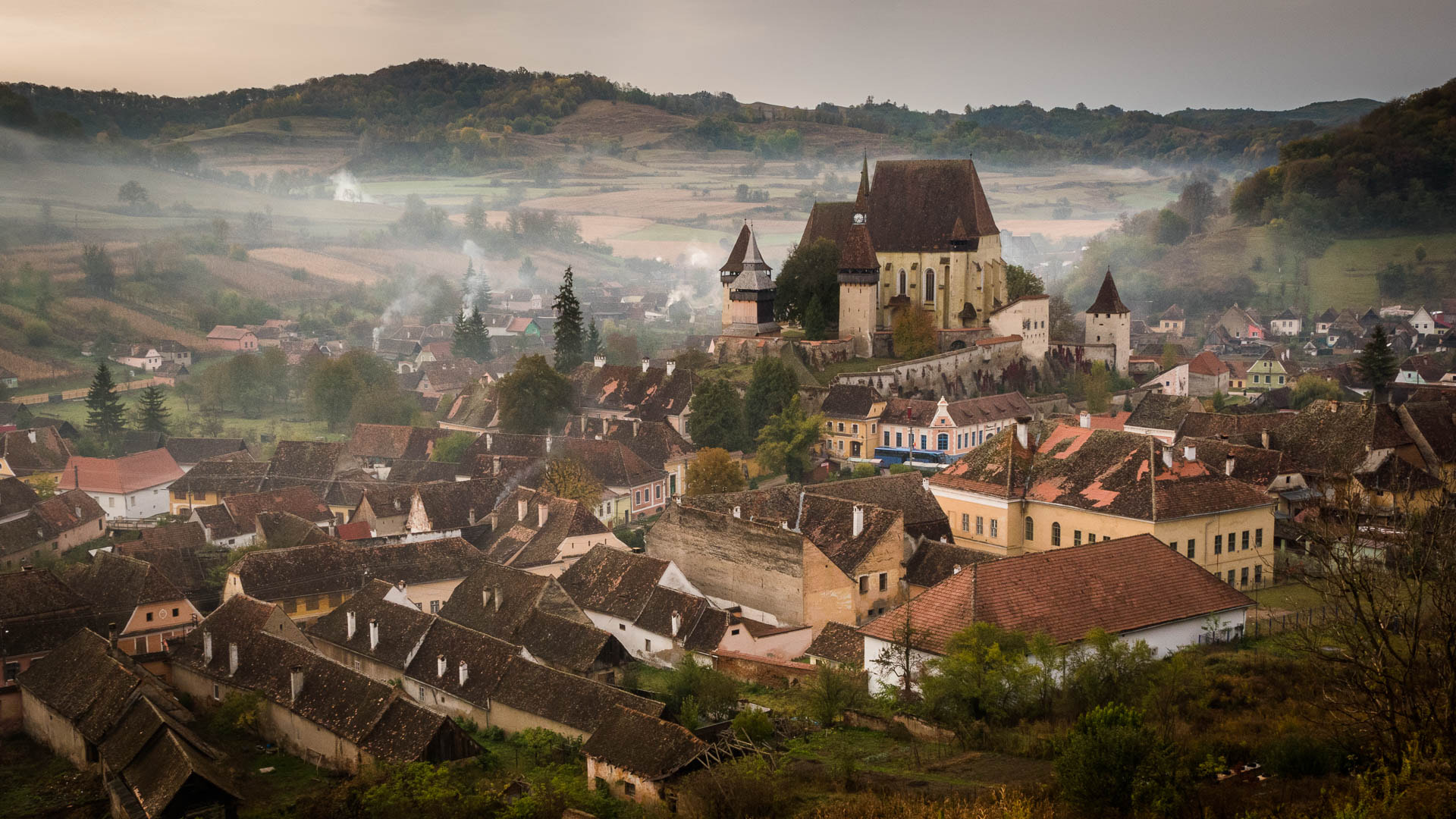
The Evangelical Lutheran medieval fortified church of Biertan/Birthälm during autumn

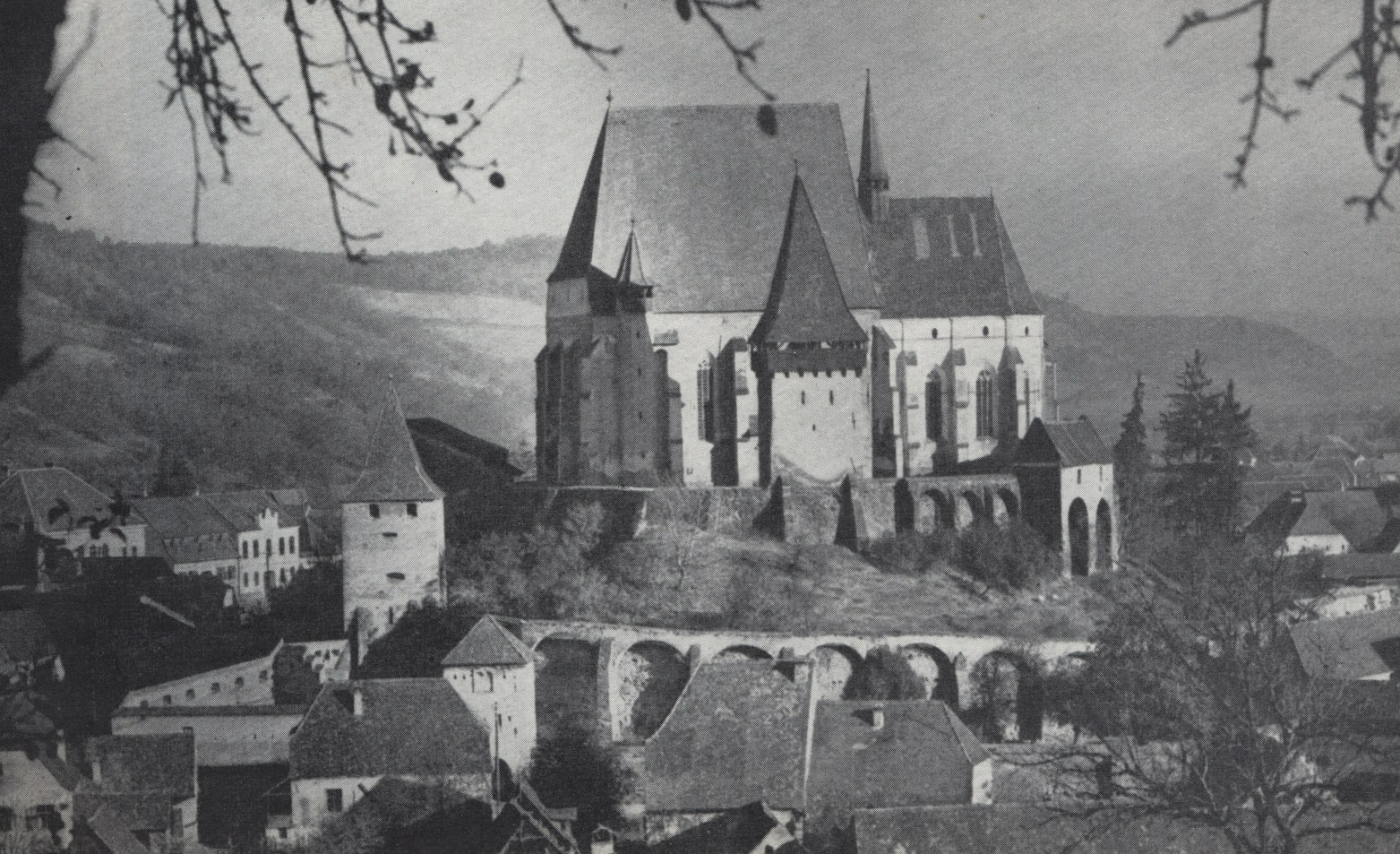
The Evangelical Lutheran fortified church of Biertan/Birthälm in 1964

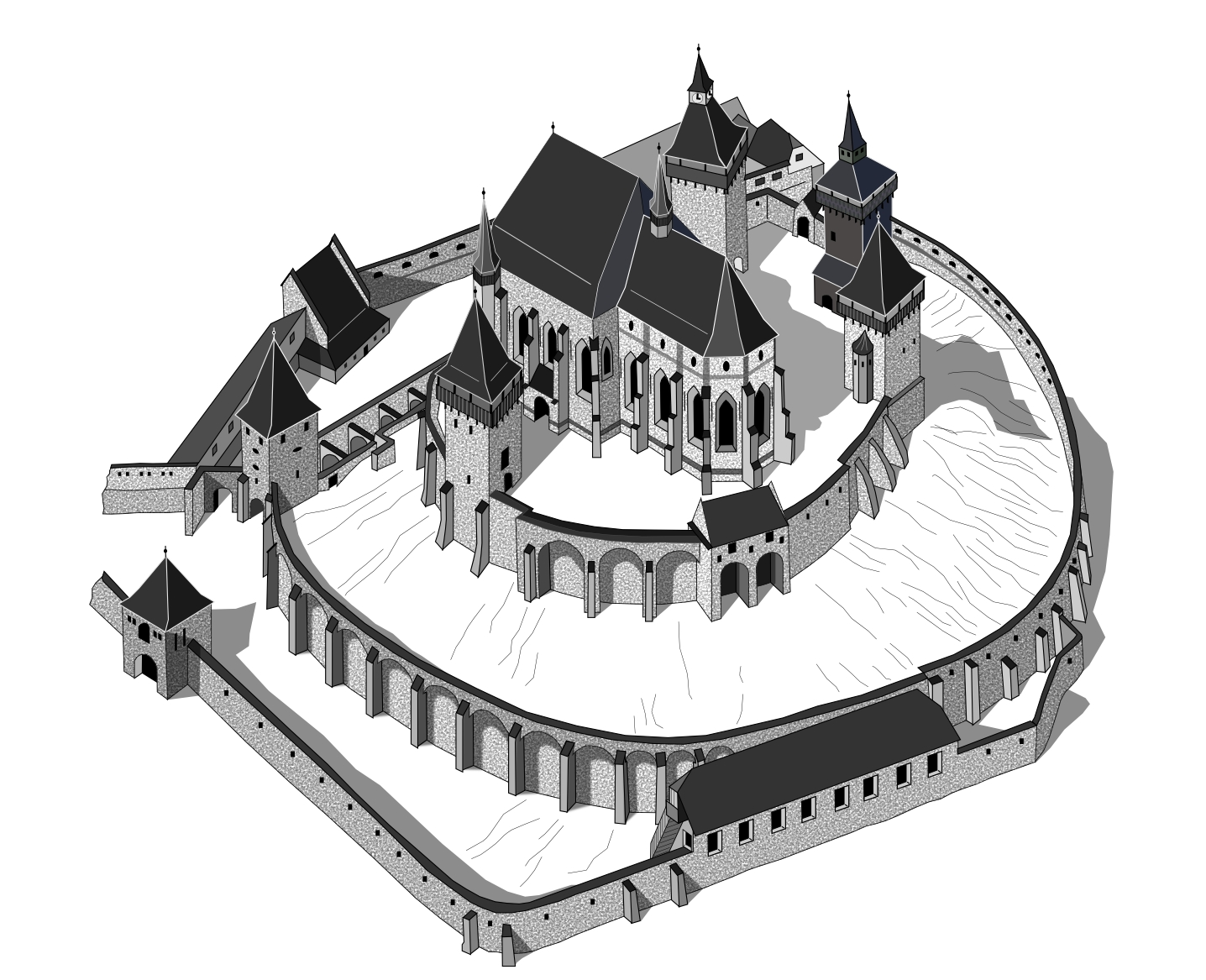
3D model rendition of the fortified church

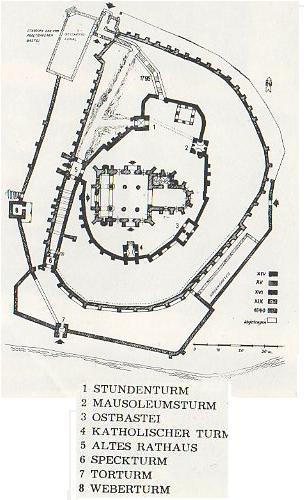
The plan of the fortified church

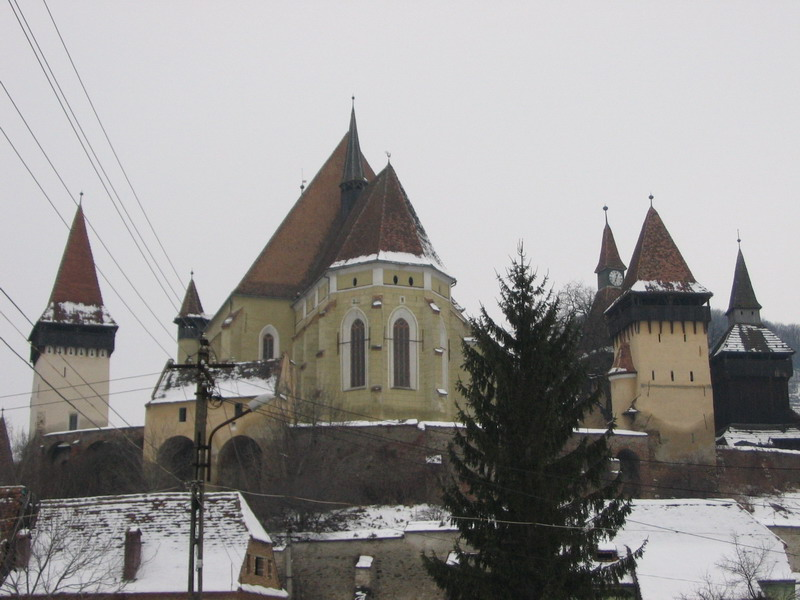
The fortified church in winter

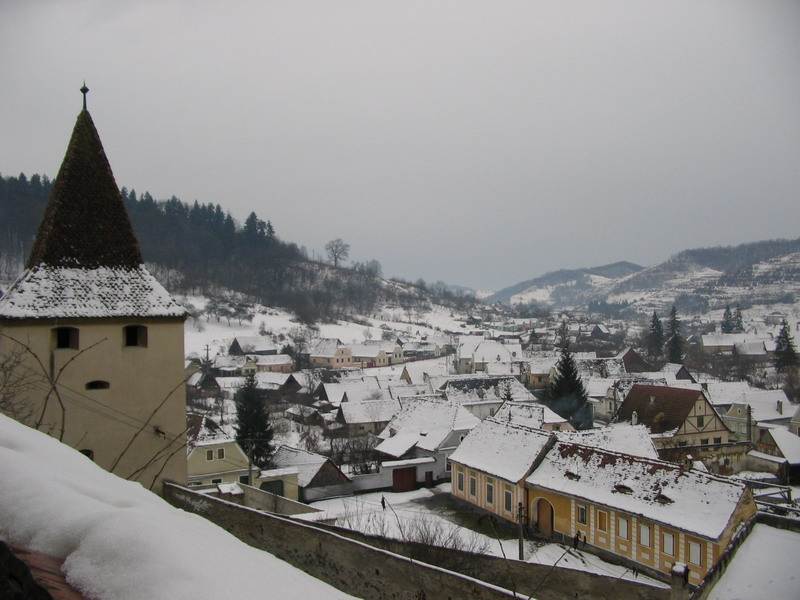
The fortified church in winter

== See also ==
- Biertan Donarium
- List of castles and fortresses in Romania
- Villages with fortified churches in Transylvania
