= Voiculescu =

Voiculescu is a Romanian surname. Notable people with the surname include:

- Dan Voiculescu (born 1946), politician
- Dan-Alexandru Voiculescu (1940–2009), composer and musicologist
- Dan-Virgil Voiculescu (born 1949), mathematician
- Nicolae Voiculescu, former Mayor of Bucharest
- Vasile Voiculescu (1884–1963), writer
- Vlad Voiculescu (born 1983), politician

== See also ==
- Voicu
