= Saschiz Peasants' Fortress =

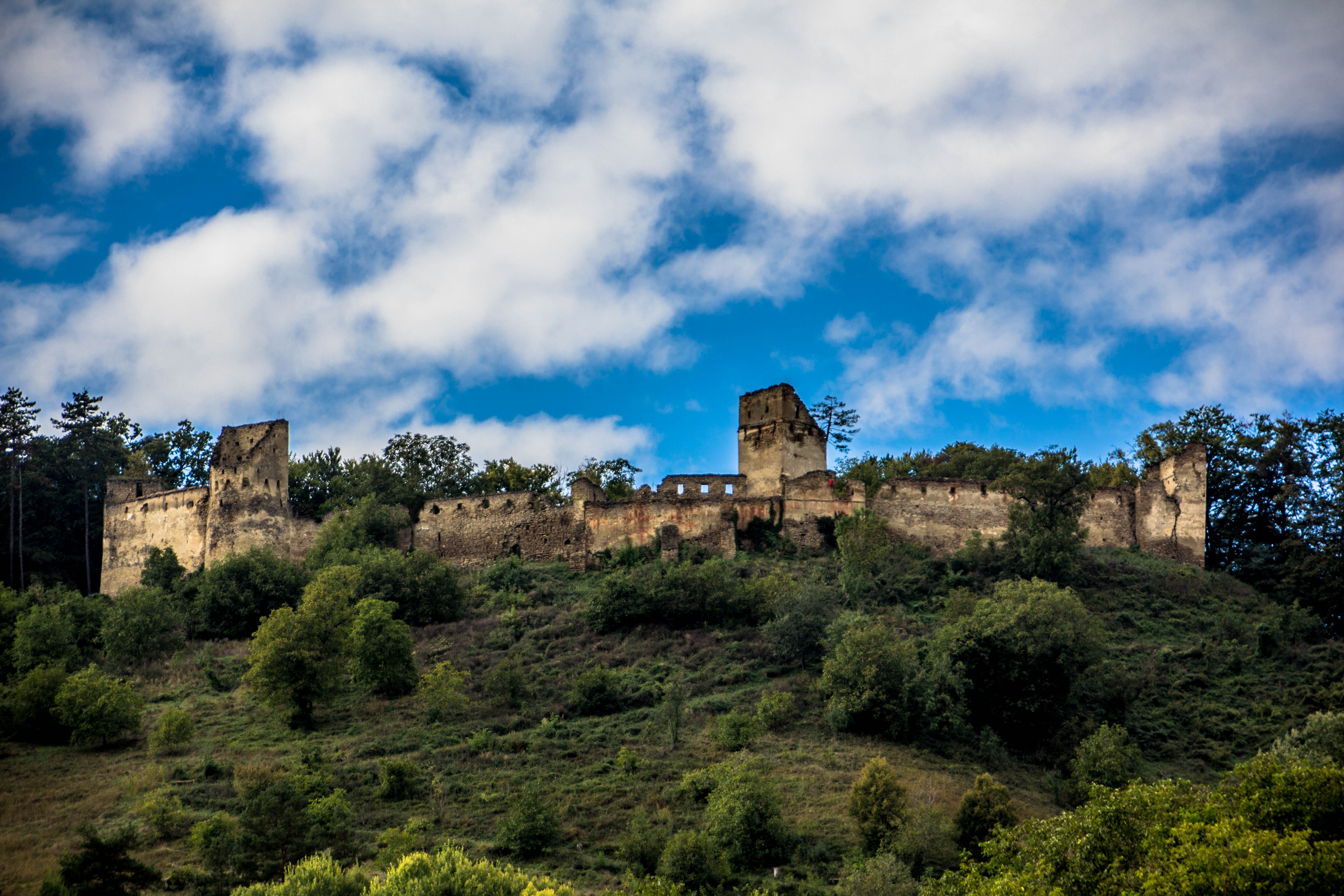
Saschiz Peasants' Fortress

The Saschiz Peasants' Fortress (Romanian: Cetatea Țărănească din Saschiz), also the Refuge Fortress (Cetatea de Refugiu), is a fortress located in Saschiz, Mureș County, Romania.

The site originally featured a Neolithic defensive structure made of earthen dikes and palisades. Shortly after the settlement of Transylvanian Saxons in the area, work on the present fortress began. Because it was too large an undertaking for a single village, seven villages, including Saschiz, contributed to the construction. The inhabitants of each had the right to seek refuge there in times of danger or war. Construction began some time after 1347, and was still underway in 1470. Virgil Vătășianu dated it to the late 14th century or the first half of the 15th.

The fortress was built of stone boulders and brick fragments on a rocky hill near the northwestern edge of the village. The site is strategic: it is the highest point in the vicinity, offering clear visibility over the main roads and the valleys. Three sides are very steep, and the only access is through an easily controlled road from the village. The fortress is an irregular polygon, 90 meters long and 52 meters wide. The walls are up to ten meters high and two meters thick at the base. The structure has a surrounding wall with three original towers: the gate tower, the school tower on the north and the princely tower on the south. Towers for the priest and the munitions were added later. Oral tradition records the existence of a well, 80 meters deep, that led to a tunnel linking the fortress with the Saschiz fortified church in the village center. A tunnel entrance does exist, but facing west, perhaps linking the fortress to the stream that flows behind it, below the steep face of the hill.

In the early 20th century, the fortress was still in good shape and used by the community. It was abandoned following the deportation of Germans from Romania after World War II, leading to its constant degradation and ruin. By the late 20th century, the outer wall was gone, the towers were roofless and partly collapsed, while the entryway was in bits and pieces. A restoration plan was drafted in the 1990s, although the actual work only started two decades later. Archaeological excavations took place in 1999-2000, and again in 2023. Following the completion of restoration work, the fortress opened to visitors in 2026. It is listed as a historic monument by Romania's Ministry of Culture and Religious Affairs.
