= Ion Dacian =

Romanian opera singer

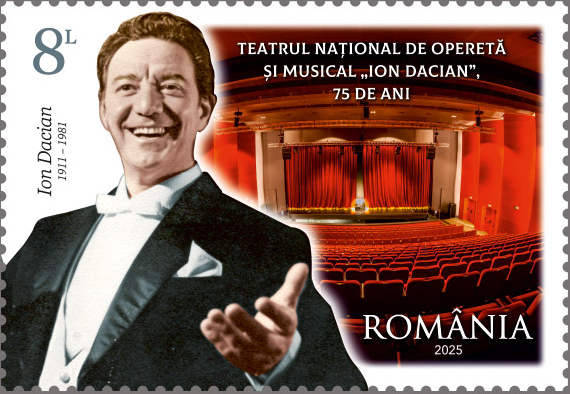
- Dacian on a 2025 stamp of Romania
- Born: Ion Pulcă; 11 October 1911; Saschiz, Mureș County, Romania
- Died: 8 December 1981 (aged 70); Bucharest, Romania
- Education: Music Academy of Cluj, Law Faculty
- Occupations: Tenor, singer
- Known for: Light opera

Ion Dacian, born Ion Pulcă (11 October 1911 – 8 December 1981) was a Romanian tenor known especially as a light opera singer.

He was born in 1911 in Saschiz, Mureș County. Dacian studied in parallel and graduated both from the Law Faculty and the Music Academy of Cluj. His canto teacher was Ion Crișan. He died in 1981 in Bucharest.

== Legacy ==
The National Operetta and Musical Theatre in Bucharest is named after Ion Dacian. A festival dedicated to him is also held at this theatre.
