= Saschiz =

- Commune
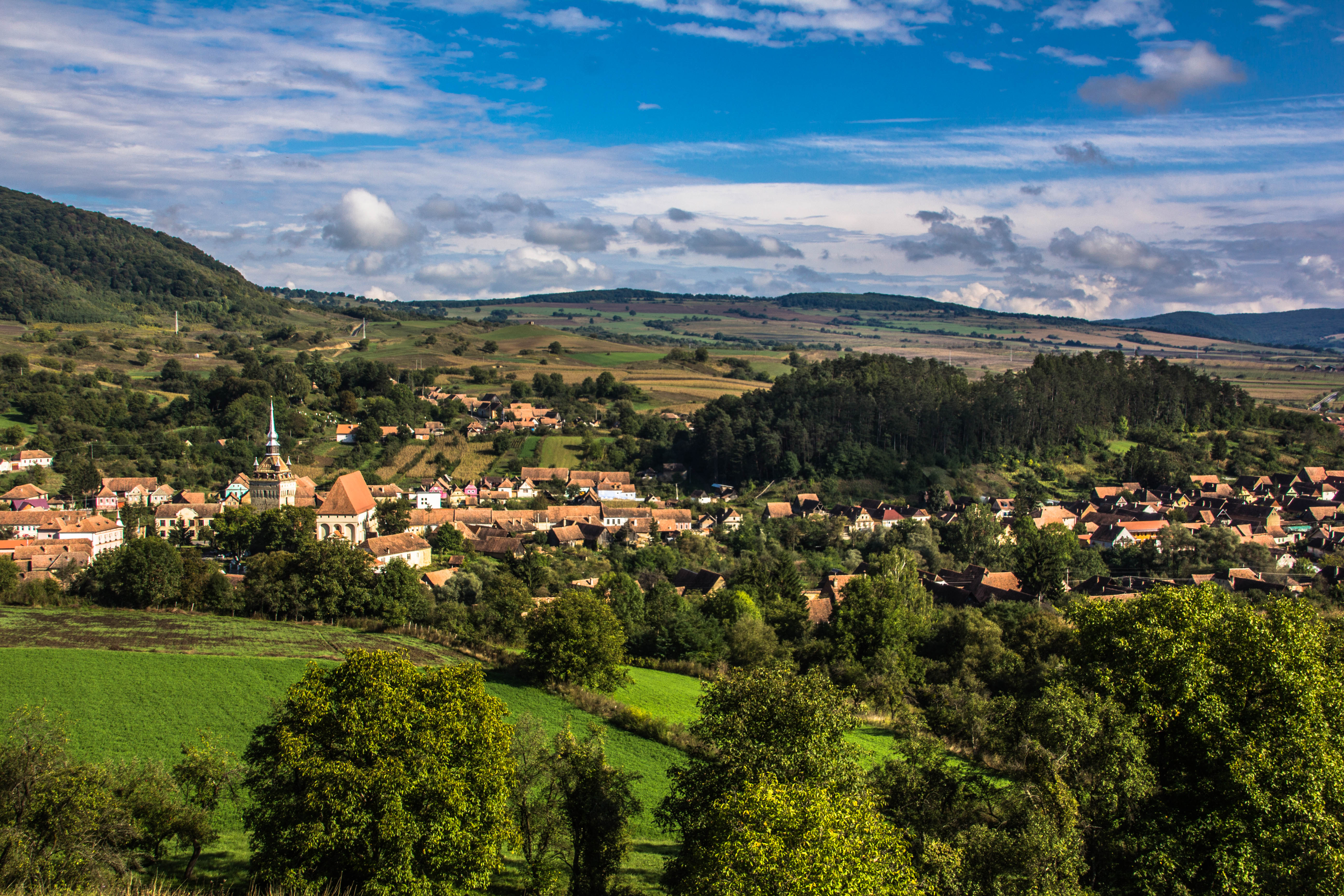
- The fortified church seen from the peasant citadel

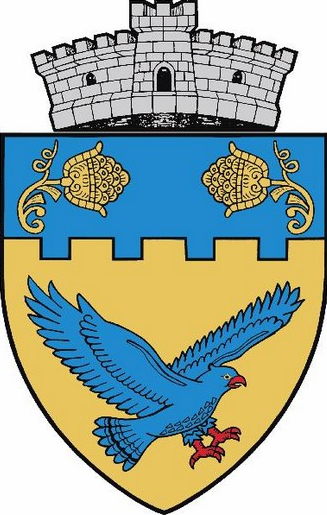
- Coat of arms

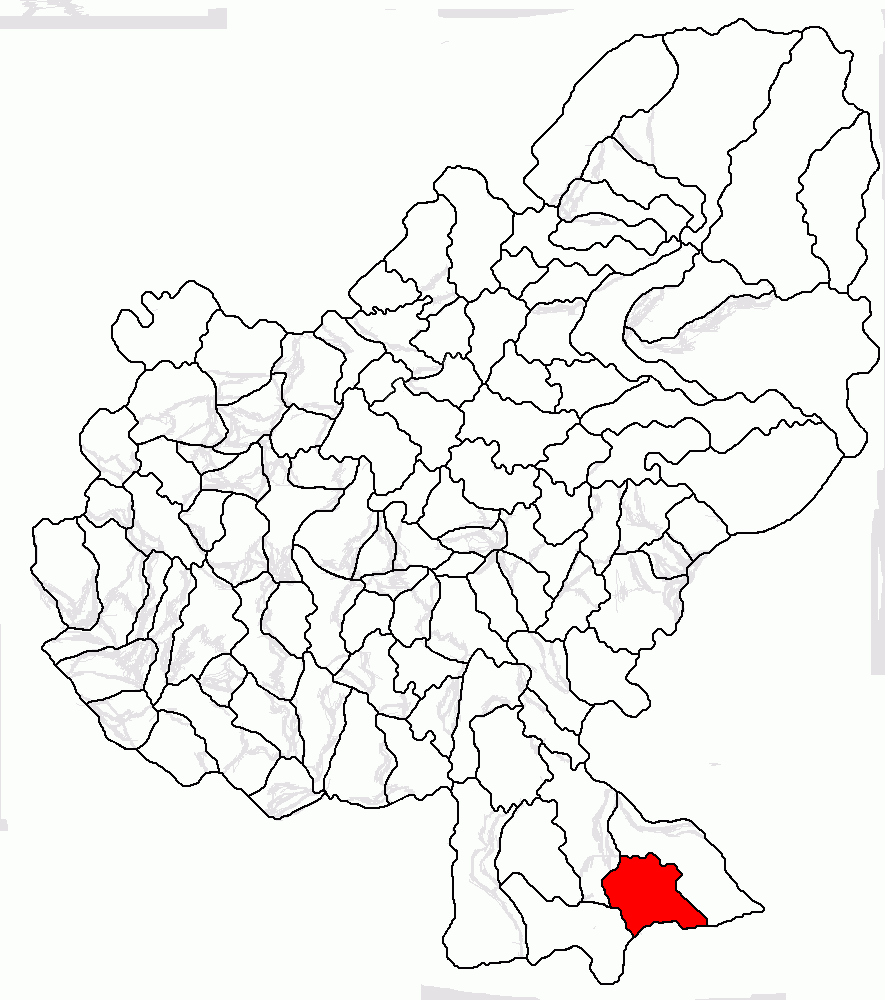
- Location in Mureș County

- Location in Romania
- Coordinates: 46°11′N 24°58′E
- Country: Romania
- County: Mureș

Government
  - Mayor (2020–2024): Ovidiu Șoaita (PNL)
- Area: 98.21 km^{2} (37.92 sq mi)
- Elevation: 410 m (1,350 ft)
- Population (2021-12-01): 2,080
  - Density: 21.2/km^{2} (54.9/sq mi)
- Time zone: UTC+02:00 (EET)
  - Summer (DST): UTC+03:00 (EEST)
- Postal code: 547510
- Area code: (+40) 0265
- Vehicle reg.: MS
- Website: saschiz.ro

Saschiz (German: Keisd or Hünenburg; Hungarian: Szászkézd, Hungarian pronunciation: [ˈsaːskeːzd]; Transylvanian Saxon: Keist) is a commune in Mureș County, Transylvania, central Romania. It is composed of three villages: Cloașterf (Klosdorf; Miklóstelke), Mihai Viteazu (Zoltan until 1932; Zoltendorf; Zoltán), and Saschiz.

Saschiz, with its 15th-century church, has been the home of a UNESCO World Heritage Site, Villages with fortified churches in Transylvania, since its designation in 1999.

== Geography ==
Saschiz is situated on the Târnava Plateau, in the south-central part of the Transylvanian Plateau, at an altitude of 410 m (1,350 ft), on the banks of the river Scroafa. It is located at the southern extremity of Mureș County, on the border with Brașov County. The commune is about 20 km (12 mi) east of the city of Sighișoara; the county seat, Târgu Mureș, is 65 km (40 mi) northwest of Saschiz.

The commune is crossed by national road DN13 (part of European route E60), which connects Brașov with Sighișoara and Târgu Mureș. The route of the Via Transilvanica long-distance trail passes through both Saschiz and Cloașterf.

== Demographics ==
Historical population
| Year | Pop. | ±% |
|---|---|---|
| 1850 | 2,771 | — |
| 1880 | 2,961 | +6.9% |
| 1900 | 3,201 | +8.1% |
| 1910 | 2,815 | −12.1% |
| 1930 | 2,820 | +0.2% |
| 1956 | 3,127 | +10.9% |
| 1977 | 2,731 | −12.7% |
| 1992 | 2,133 | −21.9% |
| 2002 | 2,048 | −4.0% |
| 2011 | 1,965 | −4.1% |
| 2021 | 2,080 | +5.9% |
Source: Census data

At the 2002 census, Saschiz had a population of 2,048: 88% Romanians, 5% Germans (more specifically Transylvanian Saxons), 4% Hungarians, and 3% Roma. At the 2011 census, the commune had 1,965 inhabitants, of which 82.29% were Romanians, 8.96% Roma, 3.05% Germans, and 2.09% Hungarians. At the 2021 census, Saschiz had a population of 2,080; of those, 85.82% were Romanians, 6.92% Roma, 1.97% Germans, and 1.06% Hungarians.

== Natives ==
- Ion Dacian (1911–1981), light opera singer
- Dan-Alexandru Voiculescu (1940–2009), composer

== See also ==
- Transylvanian Saxons
- Villages with fortified churches in Transylvania
