= Dan-Alexandru Voiculescu =

Romanian composer

Dan Voiculescu (born 20 July 1940 in Saschiz, died 29 August 2009, in Bucharest) was a Romanian composer, doctor of musicology (1983), professor of counterpoint and composition at the Music Academy in Cluj-Napoca (since 1963) and the National Music University of Bucharest (since 2000), and a member of the Union of Romanian Composers and Musicologists (since 1965).

His musicological studies fill a niche in the Romanian bibliography; they are significant contributions towards understanding the polyphony of 20th-century classical music. His compositions are performed frequently, both in Romania and abroad.

== Published works ==
=== Compositions ===
- The Bald Prima Donna, comical chamber opera, after Eugène Ionesco, 1992–1993
- Cantata for baritone, choir and orchestra, 1977
- Simfonia ostinato, 1963
- Visions cosmiques, 1968
- Music for strings, 1971
- Pieces for orchestra, 1975
- Suite from Codex Caioni for strings, 1996
- Inflorescences for strings, 2001
- Works for piano solo
  - Fables
  - Dialogs
  - Sonata
  - Croquis
  - Sonantes
  - Spirals
  - Toccata piano
  - Toccata armonica
  - Toccata robotica
  - Toccata for a hand
- Book without end — 3 volumes of piano pieces for children
- Sonata brava for harpsichord
- 9 Sonatas for flute solo
- Sonata for clarinet solo
- Sonata for oboe solo
- Ribattuta for viola solo, 1976
- Fiorituri for violin and piano
- about 60 Songs
- 5 volumes of choral music for children
- Choral poems

=== Musicology ===
- Baroque Polyphony in the Works of J. S. Bach, 1975
- 20th Century Polyphony, 1983 ("Polifonia secolului XX", Editura Muzicala, Bucuresti 2005 ) ISBN 973-42-0407-6
- The Bach Fugue, 1986 ("Fuga în creatia lui J. S. Bach", Editura Muzicala, Bucuresti 2000) ISBN 973-42-0247-2
- many other studies on musicology

His works are published by Editura Muzicala, Bucharest (Romania), Editura Arpeggione, Cluj-Napoca (Romania) and Musikverlag Gentner Hartmann, Trossingen (Germany).

== Career ==
- 1958–1964 Attended the "Gh. Dima" Music Academy of Cluj-Napoca (Romania)
- 1963 Obtained diploma for Piano (under the supervision of Magda Kardos)
- 1964 Obtained diploma for Composition (under the supervision of Sigismund Todutza)
- 1965 Became a member of the Union of Romanian Composers
- 1968 Studied composition with V. Mortari in Venice (Italy)
- 1971–1972 Studied composition with K. Stockhausen in Cologne (Germany)
- 1972, 1978 Attended the Darmstädter Kurse für Neue Musik
- 1979–1991 Editor of Lucrari de Muzicologie (Musicological Works), published by the "Gh. Dima" Music Academy of Cluj-Napoca
- 1983 Doctor of Musicology
- 1984 Awarded the George Enesco Prize of the Romanian Academy
- 1989 Awarded the Mihai Eminescu Prize
- 1972–2005, seven times, Prize of the Union of Romanian Composers
